= List of renamed places in Romania =

This is a list of renamed places in Romania.

== Background ==
During the twentieth century, a number of places in Romania had their names changed for various reasons. For instance, Brașov was called Orașul Stalin by the Communist regime in order to pay homage to the Soviet leader. Some of those names were changed back to the original; Brașov regained its old name as Romania's leadership began to develop policies more independent of the Soviet Union. The reason for many Transylvanian name changes was to give a more "Romanian-sounding" name to certain settlements, since in many case the original Romanian name was too close to the Hungarian or German one, from which it was derived (usually a simple re-writing of the name according to Romanian phonetics). Many places had their names changed by a decree from 1964 due to their perceived inappropriate nature.

== Since 1921 ==
This list enumerates the changes made from 1921 onwards.

Not included are the names of localities in the Banat, in Transylvania, and in Bukovina that were changed from Hungarian and/or German to Romanian immediately after World War I, the names of localities in Northern Transylvania that were changed back to Hungarian from 1940 to 1944, and those of localities in Greater Romania that today no longer form part of Romania, such as Southern Dobrudja and the Bugeac.

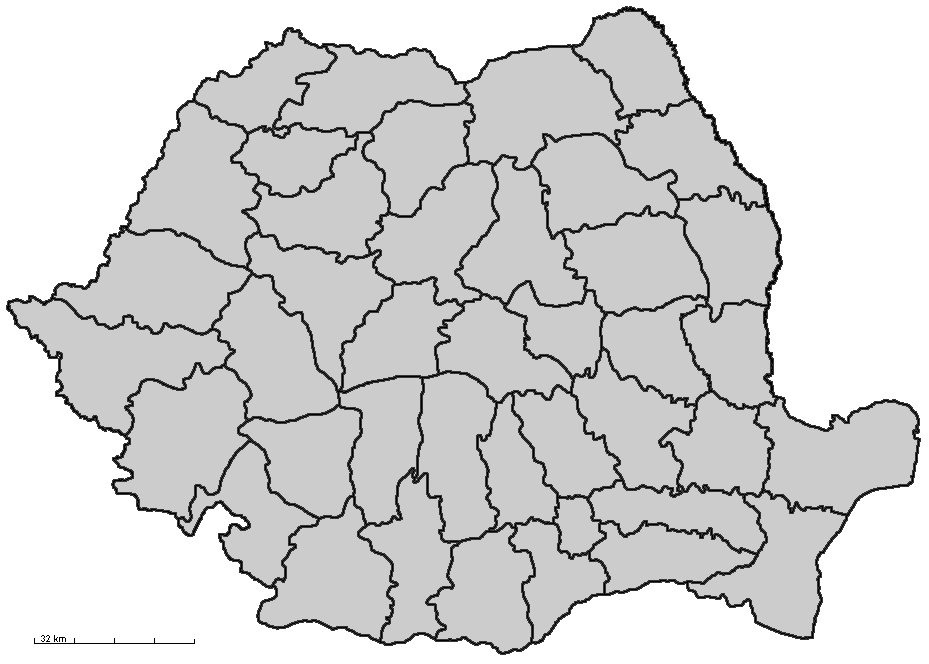

Original name	New name	Period
Akbaș	Albești, Constanța County	unknown
Alakap	Poarta Albă, Constanța County	unknown
Arpătac	Araci, Covasna County	1925
Aziza	Saligny, Constanța County	unknown
Bairamdede	Independența, Constanța County	since the 1930s
Bendorf	Benești, Sibiu County	1925
Beșeneu	Pădureni, Covasna County	1960
Biulbiul (Bülbül)	Ciocârlia, Constanța County	unknown
Binținți	Aurel Vlaicu, Hunedoara County	1925
Brașov	Orașul Stalin, Brașov County	8 September 1950 – 24 December 1960
Brătieni	Brăduleț, Argeș County	since 1949
Budiul de Câmpie	Papiu Ilarian, Mureș County	1925
Canara, Kanara	Ovidiu, Constanța County	1930
Caracoium (Karakoium), Carachioi	Năvodari, Constanța County	1927
Caracicula	Limanu, Constanța County	1920–1940 (?)
Caraomer, Cara Omer (Karaomer)	Negru Vodă, Constanța County	since 1926
Caranasuf	Istria, Constanța County	1920–1940 (?)
Carasu (Karasu)	Medgidia, Constanța County	since 02.09.1856
Cartal (Kartal)	Vulturu, Constanța County	unknown
Cerchezchioi	Cerchezu, Constanța County	unknown
Chiostel (Köstel)	Castelu, Constanța County	unknown
Cioara	Bărăganul, Brăila County	since the 1950s (?)
Cioara	Săliștea, Alba County	1960
Cluj	Cluj-Napoca	since October 16, 1974
Coronini	Pescari, Caraș-Severin County	1960–1996
Cogealia, Kogea Ali (Koca Ali); Valea Neagră	Lumina, Constanța County	Cogealia until 1929; Valea Neagră between 1929 and 1965
Coșlar	Coșlariu, Alba County	1956
Coaciu	Făureni, Cluj County	1925
Cristuru Secuiesc	I. G. Duca, Odorhei County	1933–1940
Cuhea	Bogdan Vodă, Maramureș County	1974
Cuzgun (Kuzgun)	Ion Corvin, Constanța County	1920–1940 (?)
Cetad	Lenauheim, Timiș County	1925
Danachioi, Carol I	Nicolae Bălcescu, Constanța County	unknown
Dealul Calului	Poiana Horea, Cluj County	1956
Diciosânmărtin	Târnăveni, Mureș County	since 3 May 1941
Docuzol	Cuza Vodă, Constanța County	unknown
Domnești	Cogealac, Constanța County	unknown
Eforie Sud	Vasile Roaită, Constanța County	1949–1965
Enge-Mahale	Mereni, Constanța County	1920–1940 (?)
Fărcădinul de Jos	General Berthelot, Hunedoara County	Berthelot 1923–1960, Unirea 1965 and 2001
Fărcașfalău	Lupeni, Harghita County	1921
Felța	Florești, Sibiu County	1950
Feneșul Săsesc	Florești, Cluj County	1925
Florica	Ștefănești, Argeș County	since 1949
Frâua	Axente Sever, Sibiu County	1950
Gargalâcul-Mic	Corbu, Constanța County	unknown
Gherengic (Gerencik)	Pecineaga, Constanța County	unknown, I.G. Duca between 1933–1940
Ghiurfalău	Gheorghieni, Cluj County	1925
Ghiuvenlia (Güvenli)	Chirnogeni, Constanța County	unknown
Ghiriș	Câmpia Turzii, Cluj County	1925
Hairanchioi (Hayranköy)	Dumbrăveni, Constanța County	unknown
Hasancea	Valu lui Traian, Constanța County	since 1925
Hașiduluc	Cumpăna, Constanța County	since 1926
Hărăstaș	Călărași, Cluj County	1925
Hermeziu	Lunca Prutului, Iași County	unknown-1996
Hidiș	Podeni, Cluj County	1925
Hususău	Valea Lungă, Alba County	1925
Iad	Livezile, Bistrița-Năsăud County	1960
Ibașfalău	Dumbrăveni, Sibiu County	1925
Ienidja, Ienigea, Enigea	Deleni, Constanța County	since 1940
Ilanlâc	Vama Veche, Constanța County	1920–1940 (?)
Inancișmea (İnançeșme)	Fântânele, Constanța County	unknown
Indol	Deleni, Cluj County	1925
Jădani	Cornești, Timiș County	1960
Kara Murat, Ferdinand I	Mihail Kogălniceanu, Constanța County	Kara Murat until the 1930s; Ferdinand I until 1948
Luca	Gheorghe Doja, Mureș County	since 1952 Lukafalva
Mețențiu	Ady Endre, Satu Mare County	1957
Milișăuți	Emil Bodnăraș, Suceava County	1970 (?) – 1996
Murfatlar	Basarabi, Constanța County	Basarabi between 1924 and 1965 and between 1980 and 2007
Mustafa Agi (Mustafa Aci)	Comana, Constanța County	unknown
Musubei (Musubey)	Horia, Constanța County	unknown
Nirașteu	Ungheni, Mureș County	1921
Ocna Șugatag	Ocna Maramureșului, Maramureș County	1987–1990
Onești	Gheorghe Gheorghiu Dej, Bacău County	1965–1996
Osmanfacâ	Bărăganu, Constanța County	1920–1940 (?)
Osmanu	Unirea, Brăila County	since the 1950s (?)
Parachioi	Băneasa, Constanța County	since the 1930s (?)
Pazarlia	Târgușor, Constanța County	unknown
Peletlia	Săcele, Constanța County	1920–1940 (?)
Porcești	Turnu Roșu, Sibiu County	1960
Potoc	Deleni, Mureș County	1921
Reghinul Săsesc	Reghin, Mureș County	1925
Satișchioi (Satișköy)	Crucea, Constanța County	unknown
Sănmărtinul Sărat	Gligorești, Cluj County	1925
Sânmicloș	Nicoleni, comuna Șimonești, Harghita County	1921
Sânmihaiu	Mihăileni, comuna Șimonești, Harghita County	1921
Sânmihaiu de Jos + Sânmihaiu de Sus	Mihai Viteazu, Cluj County	1925
Slujitorii Albotești	Zăvoaia, Brăila County	since the 1950s (?)
Somfalău	Cornești, Mureș County	1925
Șard	Noroieni, Satu Mare County	1921
Șaroșul Unguresc	Deleni, Mureș County	1960
Ștei	Orașul Dr. Petru Groza, Bihor County	1958–1996
Șiminfalău	Șimonești, Harghita County	1921
Șocariciu	Unirea, Călărași County	unknown
Ștena	Dacia, Brașov County	1950
Tașaul	Piatra, Mihail Kogălniceanu commune, Constanța County	since the 1950s
Tașpunor (Tașpınar)	Siliștea, Constanța County	unknown
Tatlâgeac Mare, Domnița Elena	23 August, Constanța County	?
Tăul Boilor	Deleni, Mureș County	1960
Tâmpăhaza	Rădești, Alba County	1925
Trascău	Rimetea, Alba County	1925
Turnu-Severin	Drobeta-Turnu Severin	since May 15, 1972
Uifalău	Ferdinand (interwar); Nicolae Bălcescu, Bacău County	since 1948
Uifalău	Traian, Bacău County	unknown since when
Uioara	Ocna Mureș, Alba County	Ocna Mureșului 1925–1956
Unguri	Arini, Bacău County	since 1967
Vaidasig	Gura Arieșului, Alba County	1925
Valea Boierească	Viișoara, Argeș County	since the 1950s
Verpolea	Pădureni, Suceava County	1968
Vințu de Sus	Unirea, Alba County	1925
Vorumloc	Valea Viilor, Sibiu County	1960
Zaclău	I. C. Brătianu, Tulcea County	unknown since when
Zălau	Zalău	c. 1956

== Historical name changes ==
- Axiopolis → Cernavodă
- Abruttus → Abrud
- Ad Mediam → Băile Herculane
- Aegyssus → Tulcea
- Ampelum → Zlatna
- Apulum → Bălgrad → Gyulafehérvár → Alba Iulia
- Arrubium → Măcin
- Kronstadt → Brașov → Orașul Stalin → Brașov
- Bucureșci → București (Bucharest)
- Callatis → Mankalya → Mangalia
- Carsium → Hârșova
- Cibinum → Hermannstadt → Nagyszeben → Sibiu
- Dierna → Orșova
- Marosvásárhely → Târgu Mureș
- Napoca → Klausenburg → Kolozsvár → Cluj → Cluj-Napoca
- Noviodunum → Isaccea
- Varadinum (Latin) → (Nagy)várad (Magyar) → Varat (Turkish) → Großwardein (German) → Oradea Mare (Romanian) → (1925 shortening) Oradea
- Pelendava → Craiova
- Porolissum → Zalău
- Potaissa → Turda
- Temesvár → Tamışvar → Temesvár → Timișoara
- Tomis → Constanța
- Drobeta → Turnu Severin → Drobeta-Turnu Severin

== See also ==
- List of renamed populated places in Moldova
