= List of renamed populated places in Moldova =

The following is the list of cities and villages in Moldova that underwent a name change in the past.

== Cities ==
- Cupcini → (1961) Kalininsk → (1990) Cupcini
- Ghindești (1956) → Leninskii → (1992) Ghindești
- Hîncești (1940) → Kotovskoe (1941) → Hîncești (1944) → Kotovskoe → (1965) Kotovsk → (1990) Hîncești
- Ialoveni → (1977) Kutuzov → (1989) Ialoveni
- Sîngerei → (1965) Lazovsk → (1991) Sîngerei
- Șoldănești → (1985) Chernenko → (1988) Șoldănești
- Căinari → (1985) Dumbraveny/Dumbrăveni → (1991) Căinari
- Chizil → (1949) Biruința (Suvorov/Volintiri) → (1964) Suvorovo → (1990) Ștefan Vodă
- Pașcani pe Bîc → Novaia Nikolaevka → (1926) Anenii Noi
- Romanovca → (1957) Bessarabka → Basarabeasca (1990)
- Șcheia → Frumoasa → Cahul
- Starovka → Mărculești
- Șop Taraclia → Taraclia
- Tighina → Bender
- Vadul lui Ștefan Vodă → Vadul lui Vodă

== Villages ==
- Akendorf → (1949) Doina
- Alexandru Ioan Cuza → (1940?) Hadji-Abdul → (1960) Suvorovo (Vulcănești district) → (1990) Alexandru Ioan Cuza (Cahul district)
- Badicu Rus → (1977) Rumianțevo (Cahul district) → (?)
- Bezeni → (1966) Donici (Orhei district)
- Balan → (1973) Malinovscoe (Rîșcani district) → (?)
- Belești → (1965) Drăgușeni (Hîncești district)
- Beșeni → (1965) Codru (Telenești/Lazo district)
- Bișcotari → (1978) Codreni (Cimișlia district)
- Borceag → (1950) Biruința (Taraclia/Congaz district)
- Broasca → (1965) Floreni (Anenii Noi district)
- Buga → (1977) Dolinnoe (Criuleni district)
- Bîzdîga → (1977) Luminița → (?)
- Caitanovca → (1949) Pervomaiscoe (Drochia district)
- Cardaș → (1950) Frumușica (Comrat/Congaz district)
- Carol al II-lea → (1955) Stepnoe (Glodeni district)
- Cenușa → (1965) Frunzeni (Florești district) → Cenușa (?)
- Cicur → (1950) Roșița (Taraclia district) → (?)
- Chetrosu Neamț → (1950) Williams / Вильямс (Anenii Noi district) (later merged with nearby Chetrosu [Bîc])
- Chetrosu Bîc → (1962) Chetrosu (Anenii Noi district)
- Chișcăreni → (1955) Lazo → (1990/92) Chișcăreni (Sîngerei district)
- Chircanii Noi → (1958) Lebedenco (Cahul district)
- Chircăiești → (1976) Chircăieștii Noi
- Cîmpeni → (?) Alexanderfeld
- Cobîlca → (1968) Codreanca (Strășeni district)
- Curleni → (1986) Podgoreni (Rezina district)
- Curluceni → (1986) Făgureni (Strășeni district)
- Cîrlăneni → (1950) Kotovskii (Taraclia district)
- Cîrlani → (1965) Stejăreni (Călărași / Strășeni district)
- Colonia-Rîșcani → Malinovskoe (Rîșcani district)
- Cocuirgoi → (1950) Spicoasa (Taraclia district)
- Coiuceni → (1965) Pruteni (Fălești district)
- Cuza Vodă → (1948) Voroșilovca (Bălți district) → (1961) Lazo (Drochia district)
- Cuza Vodă → (1949) Dimitrovca (Cimișlia district)
- Decebal → (1946) Tătărăuca Mică / Malaia Tatarovka (Dondușeni/Zgurița district)
- Dolna → (1949) Pușkino → Dolna
- Dragoș Vodă → (1951) Iliciovca (Drochia district)
- Dunduc → (1961) Mirnoe (Anenii Noi district)
- Dușman → (1948) Voroșilovca → (1961) Octeabriscoe (Glodeni district)
- Kotovsk → Regina Maria (Soroca district) ?
- Regina Maria (Hîncești district) → (1949) Semionovca (Leova/Cărpineni district)
- Kirlannar → (1950) Cotovscoe (Găgăuzia)
- Denevița Nouă / Novaia Denevița → (1950) Svetlîi (Găgăuzia)
- Emental → (1949) Pervomaisk (Căușeni district)
- Flămînda → Calea Nouă (Baimaclia district)
- Fundoaia → (1986) Maiscoe (Florești district)
- Fundu Culi → (1965) Izvoreni (Ungheni district)
- Ghizdita → (1965) Fîntînița
- Ghică Vodă → (1949) Miciurin
- Iacobstal → (1947) Alava (Căușeni district)
- Iacobstal → (1949) Lazo (Căușeni district)
- Ion Brătianu → (1946) Kotovskoe (Soroca/Bălți district)
- Îndărătnici → (1985) Nucăreni (Telenești district)
- Manukbeevka / Манукбеевка → (23.01.1965) Frumușica (Leova)
- Marienfeld → (1965) Pervomaisk (Cimișlia)
- Mitropolit → (1946) Porumbrei
- Mihai-Bravo → (28.11.1946) Mihailovca (Florești)
- Mihailovca → (1984) Mihailovca Nouă (Rîbnița)
- Mihia Vodă → (1949) Ceapaevca (Tîrnova)
- Molovata → (1978) Molovata Nouă (Dubăsari)
- Mîndîc → (1965) Livădeni (Drochia)
- Nădușita → (1963) Gribova (Drochia)
- Neifeld → (1950) Tkacenko (Dubăsari)
- Nikolaevka → (1964) Iliciovca (Florești)
- Nikolaevka → (1965) Vîlcele (Leova)
- Niorcani → (1986) Poienița (Dondușeni)
- Novoselovka → (1983) Kotovskoe (Orhei)
- Țiganca Nouă → (1964) Stoianovca Nouă (Cahul)
- Opinca → (1945) Suvorovka (Fălești/Lazo district)
- Pervomaisk → (1965) Berezovka (Dondușeni)
- Piatra → (1949) Lazo (Orhei district)
- Rediul 1 → (1986) Rediul de Sus (Fălești District)
- Rediul 2 → (1986) Rediul de Jos (Fălești District)
- Roșcani → (1984) Roșcanii de Sus (Rezina district)
- Sinodinovca → (1950) Pervomaisc(oe) (Lazo district)
- Slănina → (1965) Lozeni (Drochia district)
- Spărieți → (1982) Șipoteni (Kotovsk district)
- Sîngereii Vechi → (1965) Lazovsk (Lazo district)
- Sturzeni → (1965) Ucrainca (Căușeni district)
- Suric → (1978) Mugureni (Cimișlia district)
- Sfînta Vineri → (1949) Frunze (Strășeni district)
- Telpiz → (1950) Dimitrovo (Taraclia/Comrat district)
- Troian → (1946) Slobozia Nouă (Otaci district)
- Trubaevka → (1982) Iujnoe (Vulcănești district) → (?)
- Țaregrad → (1945) Glavan (Drochia district)
- Valea Jdanului → (1965) Victoria (Leova district)
- Valea Popii → (1965) Noroceni
- Varvarî → (1986) Prioziornoe (Slobozia district) → (?)
- Vertiujeni → (1964) Pridnestrovskoe (Camenca district) → (?)
- Voinescu → (1946) Pobeda (Kotovsk district) → (?)
- Vălcineț → (1965) Maiovca (Ocnița district)
- Voroșilovka → (1958) Octeabriscoe (Camenca district) → (?)

== See also ==
- List of renamed cities in Belarus
- List of cities in Moldova
- List of renamed places in Romania
- List of renamed cities and towns in Russia
- List of renamed cities in Ukraine
