= Cerchez (river) =

- Location within Romania

Location
- Country: Romania
- Counties: Constanța County
- Villages: Cerchezu, Viroaga, Olteni

Physical characteristics
- Mouth: Ceair
  - coordinates: 43.9197°N 28.0033°E
- Length: 23 km (14 mi)
- Basin size: 90 km^{2} (35 sq mi)

Basin features
- Progression: Ceair→ Urluia→ Danube→ Black Sea
- Tributaries
  - left: Măgura
- River code: XIV.1.40.1.1

The Cerchez is a right tributary of the river Ceair in Romania. It flows into the Ceair near Dumbrăveni. Its length is 23 km (14 mi) and its basin size is 90 km^{2} (35 sq mi).
