= Ceair (Urluia) =

- Location within Romania

Location
- Country: Romania
- Counties: Constanța County
- Villages: Dumbrăveni

Physical characteristics
- Mouth: Urluia
  - coordinates: 44.0072°N 27.9726°E
- Length: 24 km (15 mi)
- Basin size: 160 km^{2} (62 sq mi)

Basin features
- Progression: Urluia→ Danube→ Black Sea
- Tributaries
  - right: Cerchez
- River code: XIV.1.40.1

The Ceair is a left tributary of the river Urluia in Romania. It flows into the Urluia near Tufani. Its length is 24 km (15 mi) and its basin size is 160 km^{2} (62 sq mi).
