= Hulboaca =

Hulboaca may refer to several places in Moldova:

- Hulboaca, a village in Grătieşti Commune, Sectorul Rîşcani of Chişinău municipality
- Hulboaca, a village in Ghetlova Commune, Orhei district
