= Urluia =

- Location within Romania

Location
- Country: Romania
- Counties: Constanța County

Physical characteristics
- Mouth: Danube
  - coordinates: 44.2452°N 27.9265°E
- Length: 98 km (61 mi)
- Basin size: 1,346 km^{2} (520 sq mi)

Basin features
- Progression: Danube→ Black Sea
- Tributaries
  - left: Ceair
  - right: Valea Baciului
- River code: XIV.1.40

The Urluia is a right tributary of the Danube in Romania. Its length is 98 km (61 mi) and its basin size is 1,346 km^{2} (520 sq mi). It passes through Lake Vederoasa and flows into the Danube near Rasova. It flows along the villages Mereni, Miriștea, Osmancea, Ciobănița, Credința, Plopeni, Conacu, Negrești, Curcani, Petroșani, Șipotele, Zorile, Urluia, Aliman and Vlahii.
