= Motiș fortified church =

Lutheran church in Romania

Coordinates: 46°03′38″N 24°20′35″E

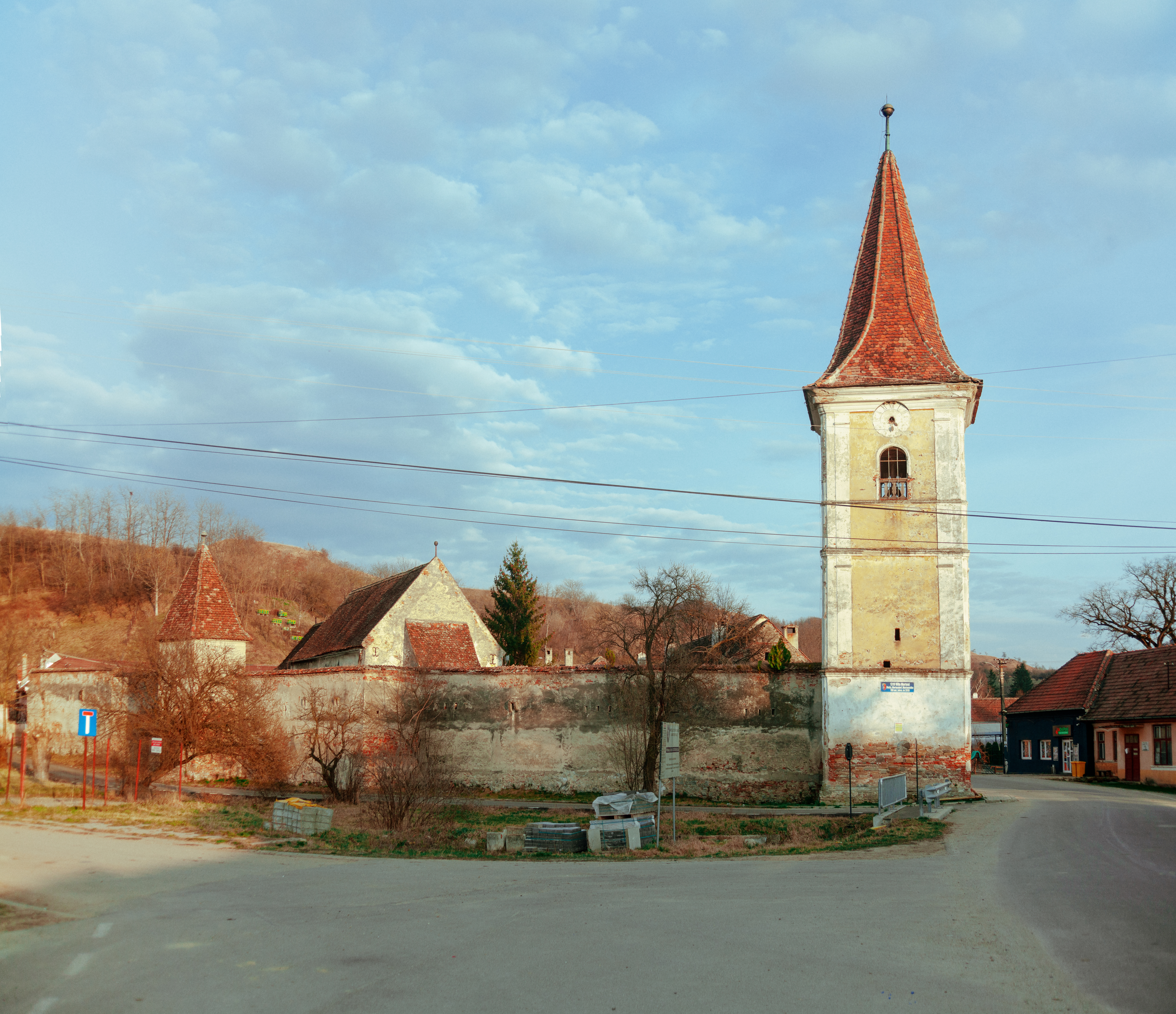
Motiș-Mortesdorf church fortress, 2024

Motiș fortified church (Romanian: Biserica fortificată din Motiș; German: Kirchenburg von Mortesdorf) is a historic Lutheran church in the village of Motiș (also known as Motișdorf, Motișul, Märtesdorf, Mertesdorf, Martonelke) in Valea Viilor commune, Sibiu County, Transylvania, Romania that was historically home to a large Transylvanian Saxon (German) population.

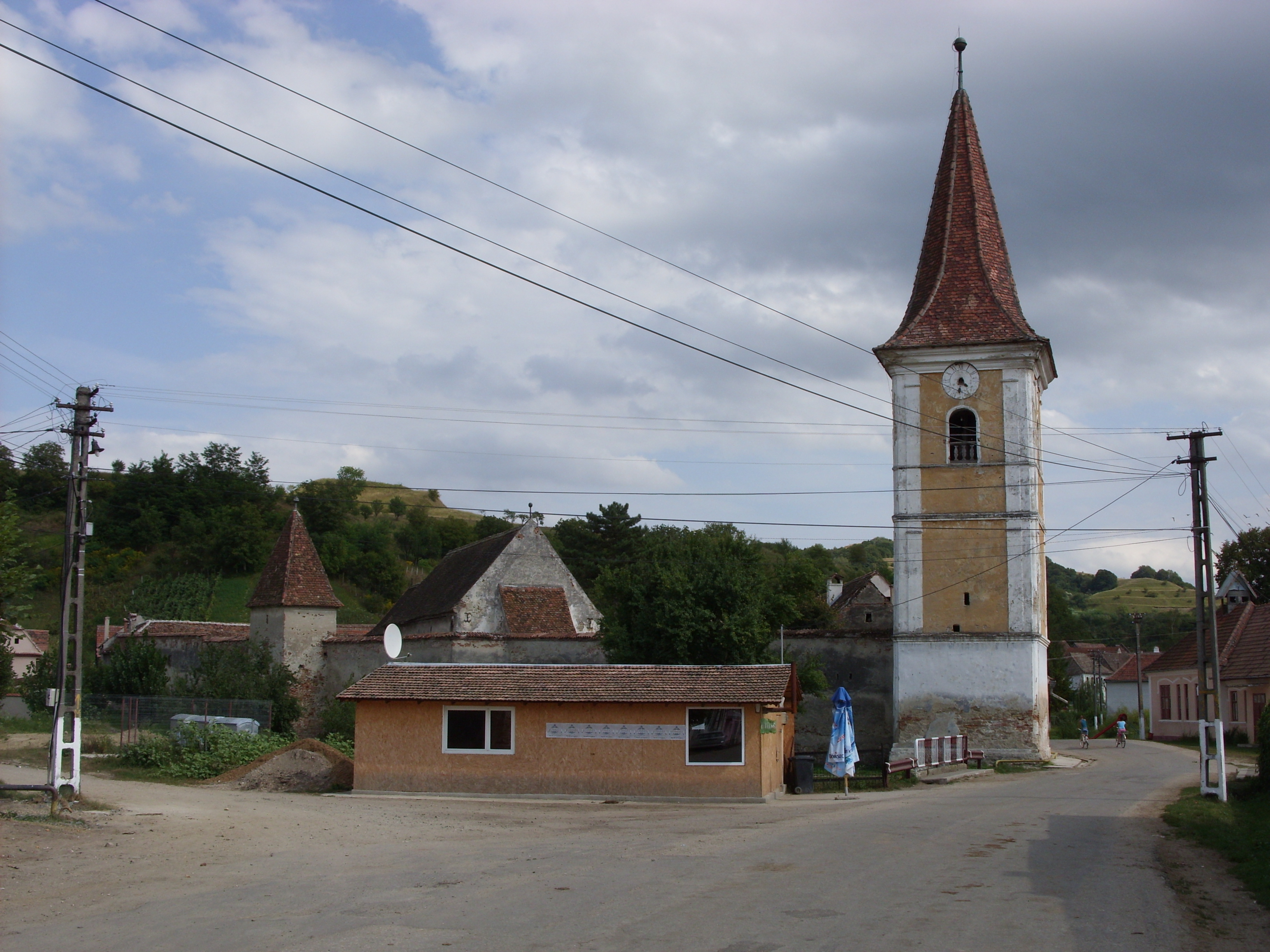
Motiș-Mortesdorf church fortress, 2010

Mortesdorf's church fortress is a historic listed building. It consists of a medieval church surrounded by fortifications.

== Church ==
The 14th-century late Gothic hall church was first mentioned in the records in 1497, just a few decades before the Protestant Reformation which made it into a Lutheran church. It was substantially renovated in 1718.

The church contains a Baroque altar, built in 1791, showing Jesus with John the Apostle and the Virgin Mary, as well ad pairs of columns featuring the apostles, Paul with the sword of faith, and Peter with a broken hand. A picture at the top represents the Resurrection of Jesus with the Eye of God above it.

== Fortifications ==
In the 15th century, a polygonal curtain wall was built around the church, with towers jutting out of it; three of them survive. One of the curtain towers was substantially raised in 1832-35 and converted into a bell tower.
