= List of renamed cities in Belarus =

The following is the list of cities in Belarus that underwent a name change in the past.

Most formal name changes in Belarus took place when the country was a member of the Soviet Union (1919-1991).

A problem with namings of Belarusian cities is their being multiple times translated into several languages officially used on the Belarusian lands: Old Belarusian (Ruthenian), Polish, Russian, Modern Belarusian.

A significant wave of "automatical" city renamings followed the annexation of Belarus by the Russian Empire in the late 18th century, when the Russian administration transcribed the names of many cities from Polish language and not from Old Belarusian. Hence, the Russian name of Hrodna was taken directly from Polish language instead of the ancient Ruthenian name Gorodno/Horodno (Городно). The Polish Brześć Litewski was translated into Brest-Litovsk (Брест-Литовск) instead of using the traditional Ruthenian Berestye (Берестье). Most of the Russian-translated names have been put into Belarusian language by the Soviet language reforms of the 1930s.

Historical Ruthenian name	Lithuanian name	Polish name	Russian name since 19th century as transcribed from Polish	Modern Belarusian name
Mien'sk (Мѣньскъ)	Minskas	Mińsk Litewski	Minsk (Минск)	Minsk (Мінск), although Miensk (Менск) also informally used
Berestie (Берестье)	Lietuvos Brasta	Brześć Litewski	Brest-Litovsk (Брест-Литовск), later just Brest (Брест)	Brest (Брэст), although Bieraście (Берасьце) also informally used
Horodno (Городно)	Gardinas	Grodno	Grodno (Гродно)	Hrodna (Гродна), although Horadnia (Горадня) or Harodnia (Гародня) also informally used
Novohorodok (Новогородокъ)	Naugardukas	Nowogródek	Novogrudok (Новогрудок)	Navahrudak (Навагрудак), although Navaharodak (Навагародак) or Navahradak (Наваградак) also informally used
Mery, Myory (Меры)	Miorai	Miory	Miory (Миоры)	Mijory (Міёры), although Miory (Мёры) also informally used

Besides that, namings of the cities in Modern Belarusian language differ from namings in other languages.

- Bieraście → Brześć Litewski → Brest-Litovsk → Brest
- Horadnia → Grodno → Hrodna
- Mieniesk → Miensk → Mińsk Litewski → Minsk

== Soviet city renamings ==
- Drissa → Verkhnyadzvinsk
- Kojdanaŭ → Dziarzhynsk
- Prapošask → Prapojsk → Slavgorod → Slawharad
- Šaciłavičy → Svietlahorsk

== See also ==
- List of renamed populated places in Moldova
- List of renamed cities and towns in Russia
- List of renamed cities in Ukraine
