= Valea Viilor fortified church =

Heritage site in Sibiu County, Romania

Valea Viilor Fortified Church
- Biserica fortificată din Valea Viilor
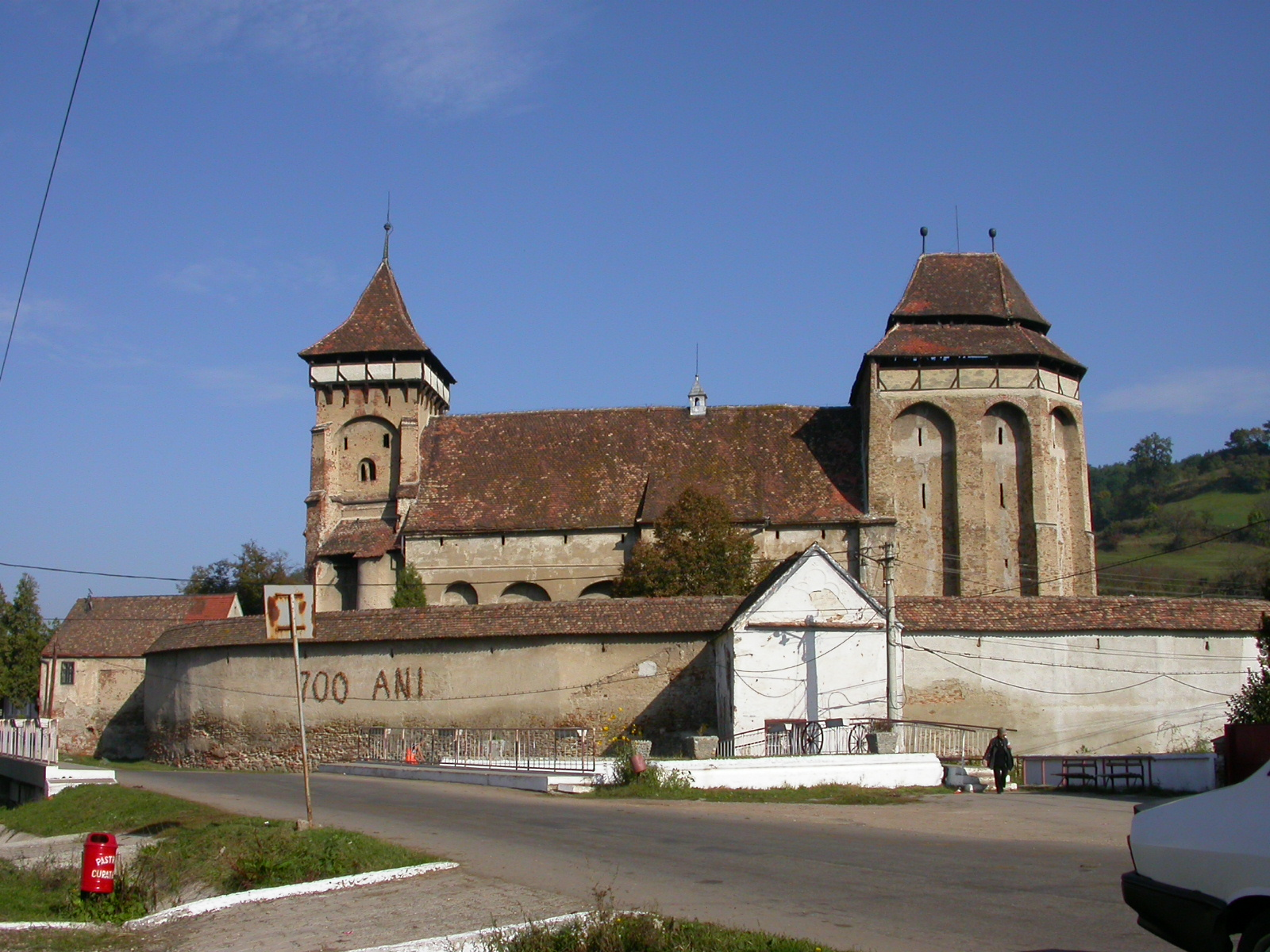

Religion
- Affiliation: Lutheran

Location
- Location: Valea Viilor, Romania
- Interactive map of Valea Viilor Fortified Church
- Coordinates: 46.083200°N 24.277055°E

Architecture
- Type: Fortified church
- Style: Romanesque
- Groundbreaking: 14th century
- Completed: 16th century
- UNESCO World Heritage Site
- Official name: Villages with fortified churches in Transylvania
- Type: Cultural
- Criteria: iv
- Designated: 1993 (17th session); 1999 (23rd session – Extension)
- Reference no.: 596
- State Party: Romania
- Region: Europe and North America
- Monument istoric
- Official name: Historic monuments in Sibiu County
- Type: architectural
- Reference no.: LMI Code: SB-II-a-A-12582 (RAN Code: 145970.01)

The Valea Viilor fortified church (Romanian: Biserica fortificată din Valea Viilor; German: Kirchenburg von Wurmloch) is a Lutheran fortified church in Valea Viilor (Wurmloch), Sibiu County, in the Transylvania region of Romania. It was built by the ethnic German Transylvanian Saxon community at a time when the area belonged to the Kingdom of Hungary. Initially Roman Catholic, it became Lutheran following the Reformation. Together with the surrounding village, the church forms part of the villages with fortified churches in Transylvania UNESCO World Heritage Site.

== Description ==
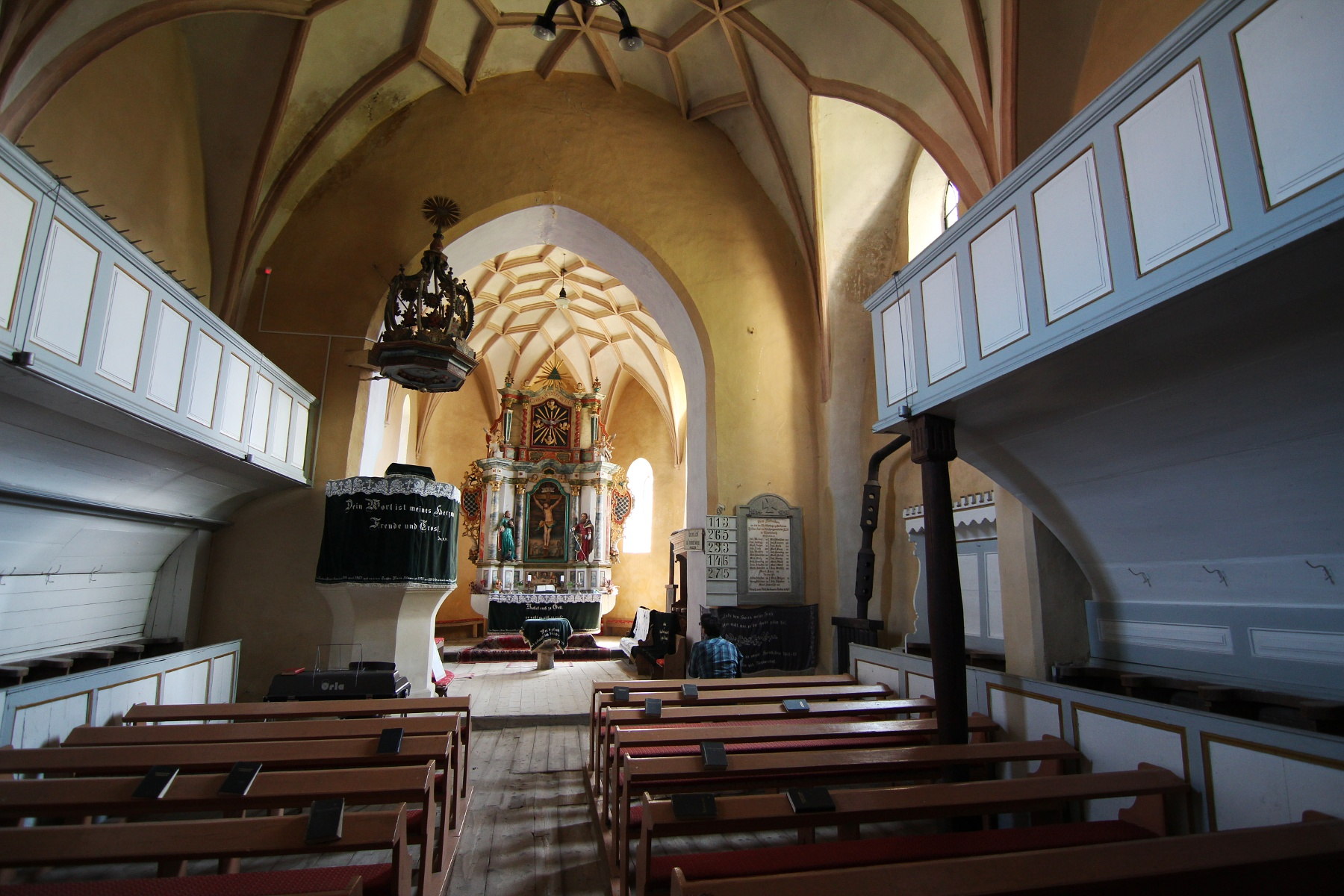
Church interior

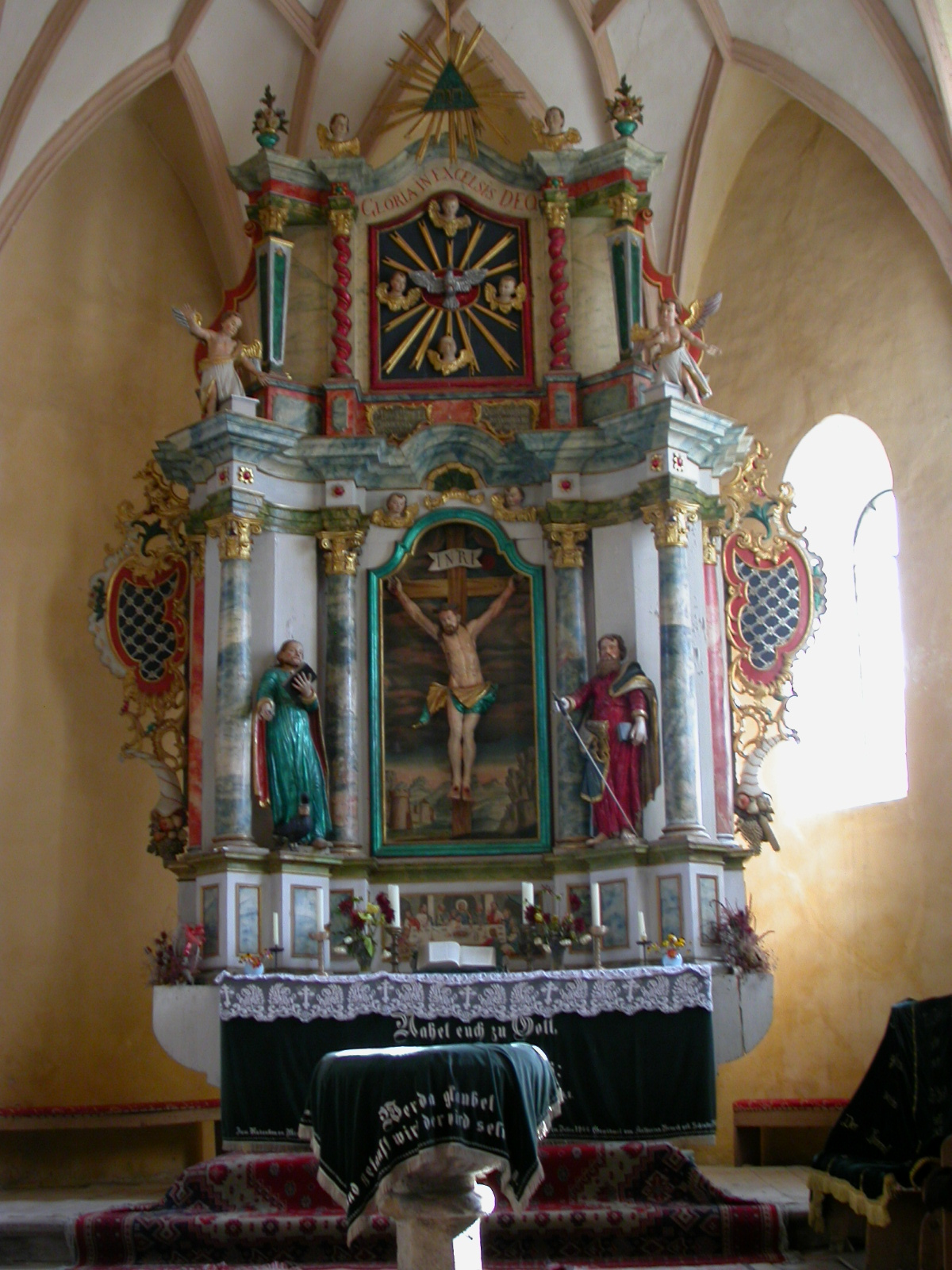
Altar

=== Background and church ===
There is evidence to suggest that an earlier Romanesque church existed in the village, as remnants could formerly be seen beneath the floor of the sacristy. This building is believed to have been 10 m long, less than half the length of the present church. The latter, in Gothic style and dedicated to Saint Peter, was begun in the 14th century. The small nave has a vaulted ceiling with a complex network of ribs, which rest on seven pairs of poles attached to the walls. The choir has a ceiling of the same type. Built in 1528, the pulpit was produced in a period of transition from Gothic to Renaissance.

The church underwent modifications at the beginning of the 16th century: a defensive level featuring parapets was added atop the nave, while towers were built next to the north and south entrances. Next to each of these was a small round tower with a spiral staircase that reached the fortified level. A third tower, near the buttress at the southwest end of the nave, provided access to the belfry, itself fitted with numerous and varied defense mechanisms. The choir was rebuilt as a three-story brick defensive tower with walls 1.5 m thick. A fourth level, which juts out slightly atop a row of corbels and is supported by arches built between the buttresses, has a timber frame parapet. The altar painting was executed in 1779 by an artist from Sighișoara.

=== Fortifications and recognition ===
A single oval fortification, constructed around 1500 and equipped with a battlement resting on brick arches, surrounds the church. Access is through an arched passage beneath the gate tower on the western side. This could be closed with a portcullis that had a grille of wood strengthened by iron. Three bastions survive, each facing one of the cardinal points. The walls reach 6–7 m in height; they have both parapets and embrasures supported by corbels.

In 1999, Valea Viilor, together with five other places, was added to the already-listed Biertan to form the villages with fortified churches in Transylvania UNESCO World Heritage Site. Additionally, the church is listed as a historic monument by Romania's Ministry of Culture and Religious Affairs, with the wall and bastions being listed as a separate entry.

Valea Viilor fortified church

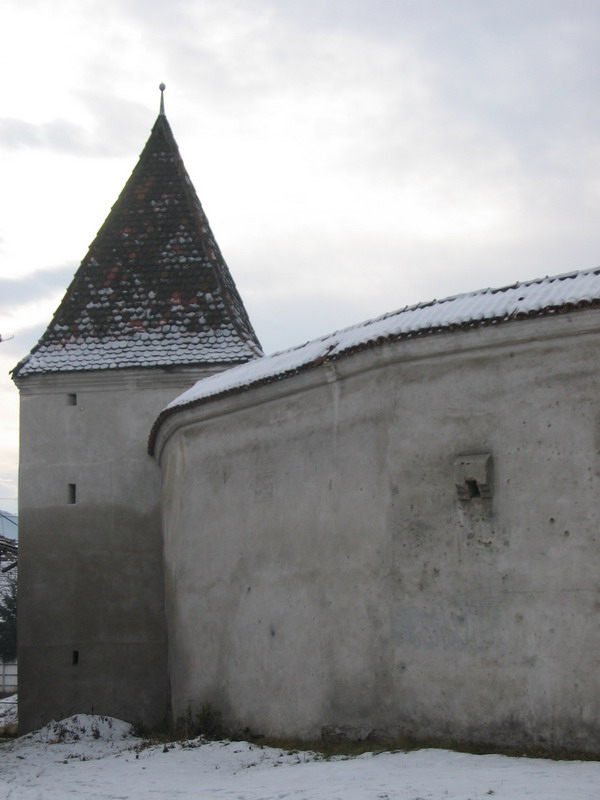
Wall and bastion

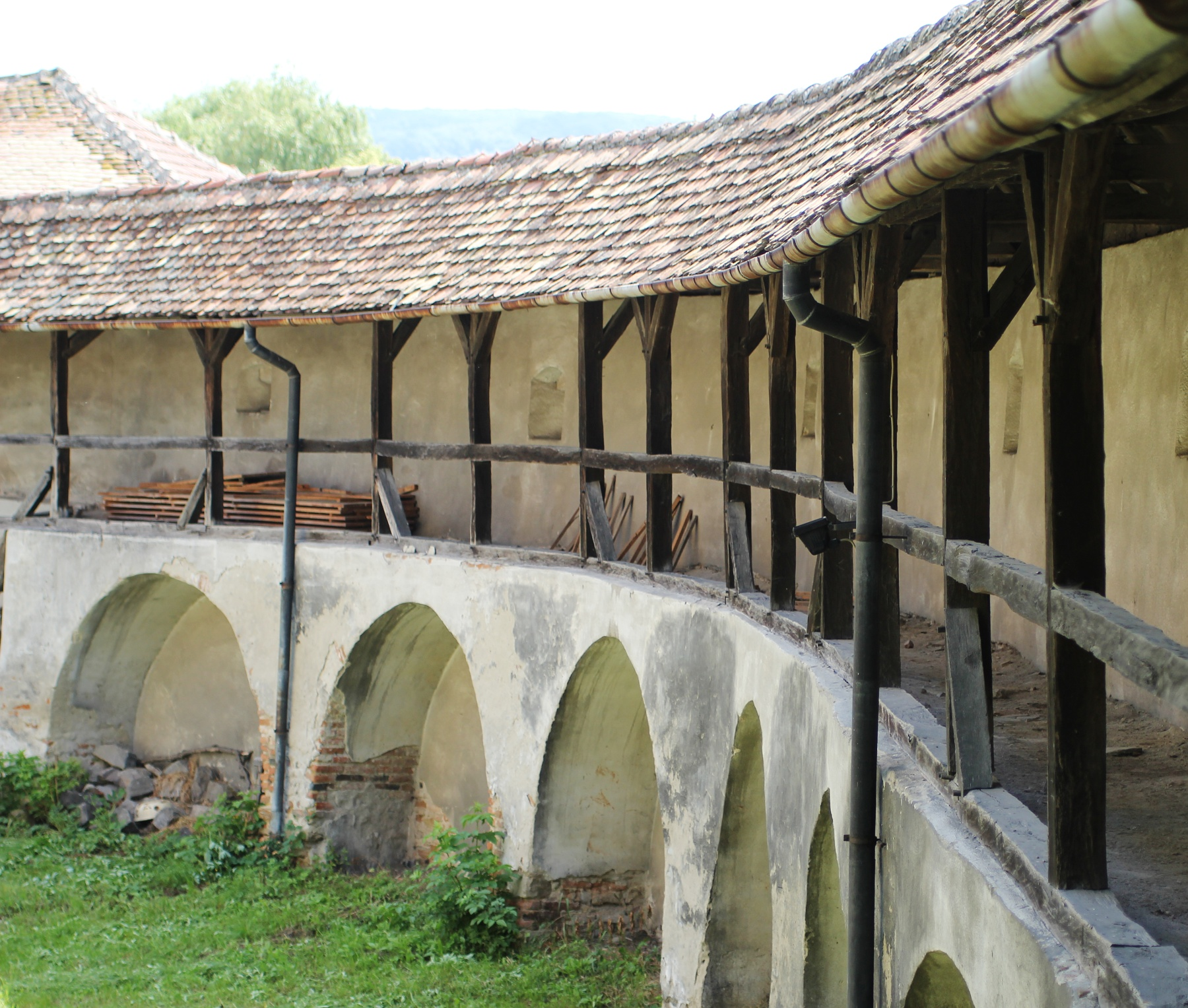
Wall interior

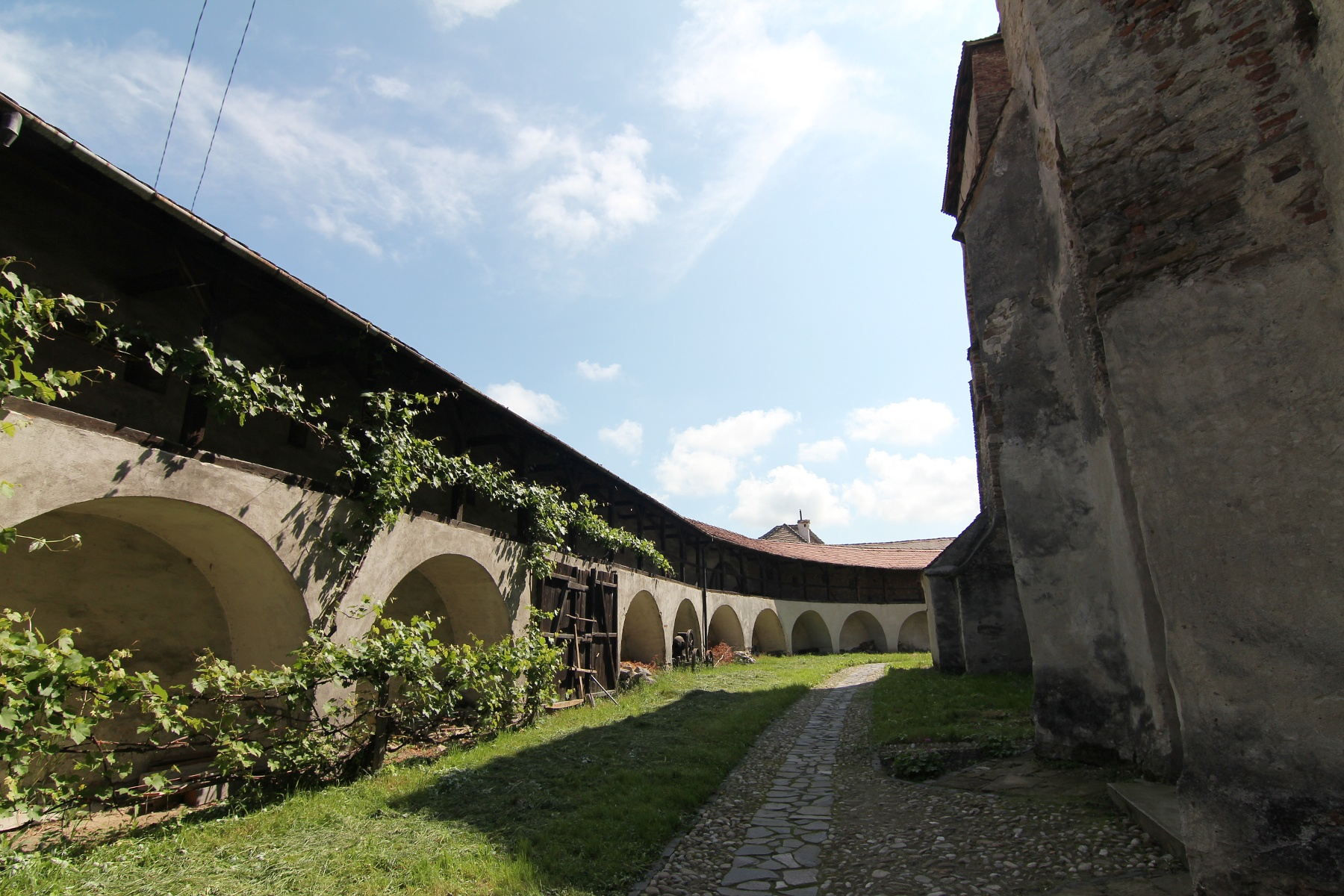
Courtyard

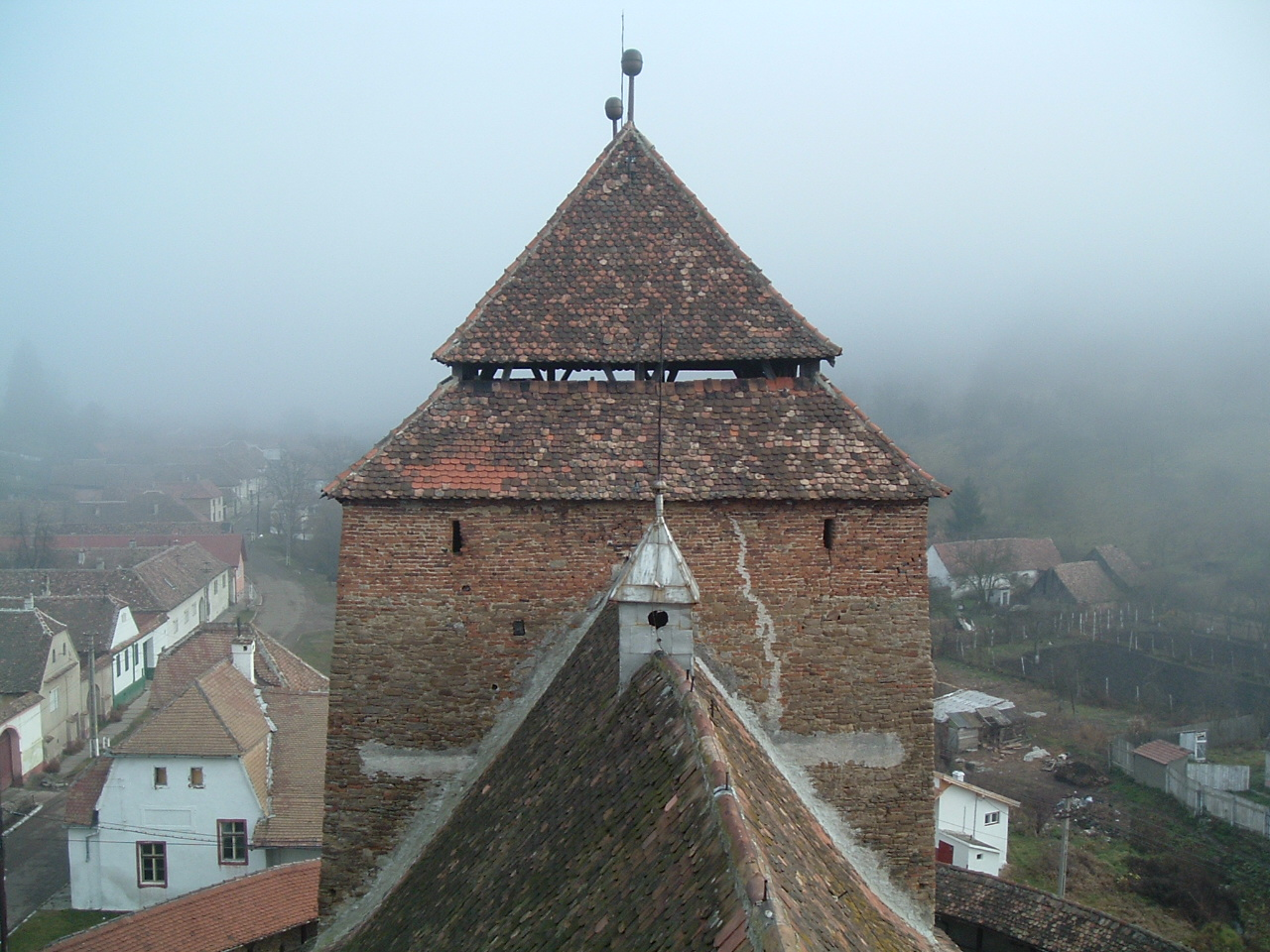
Nave tower

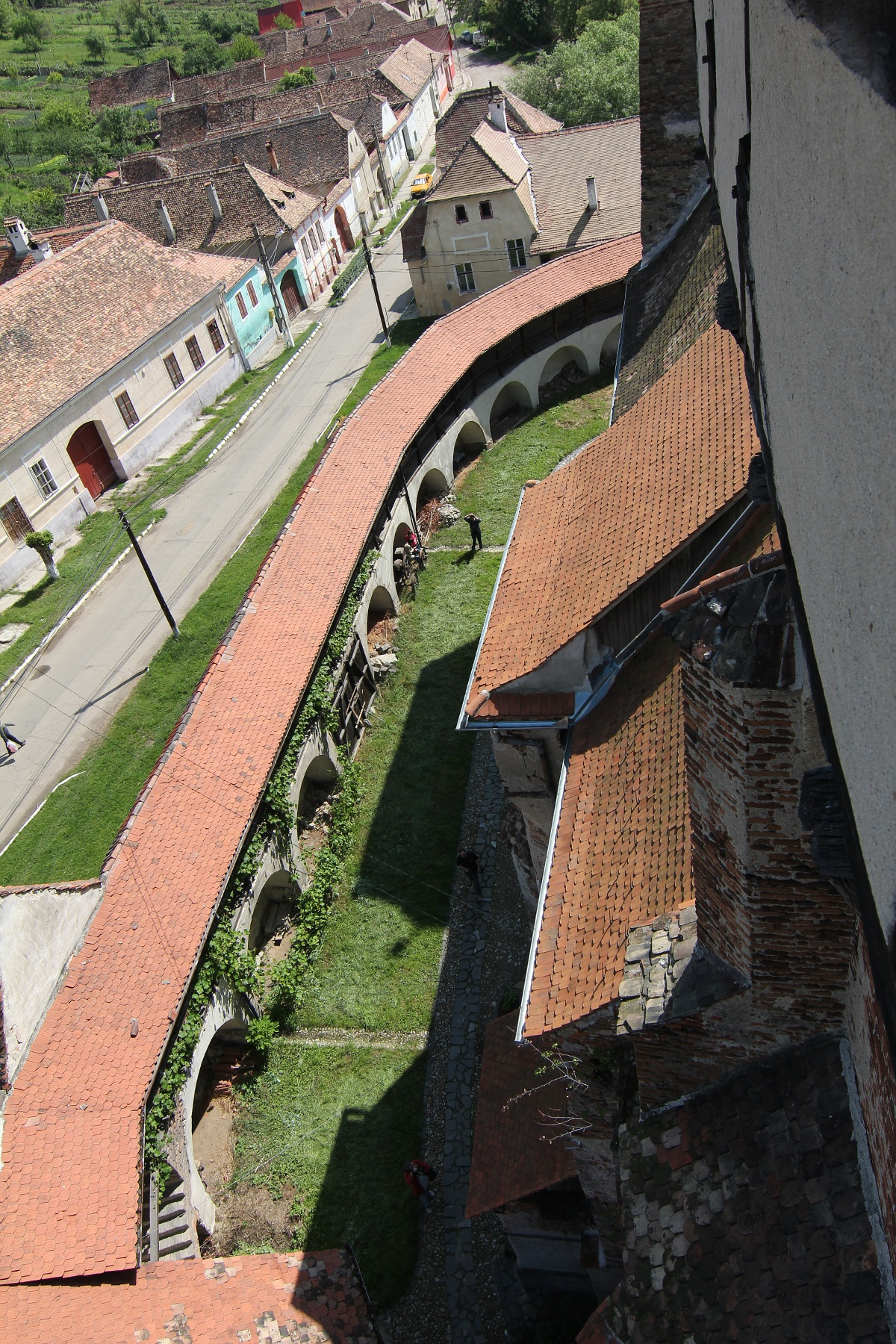
Wall from above

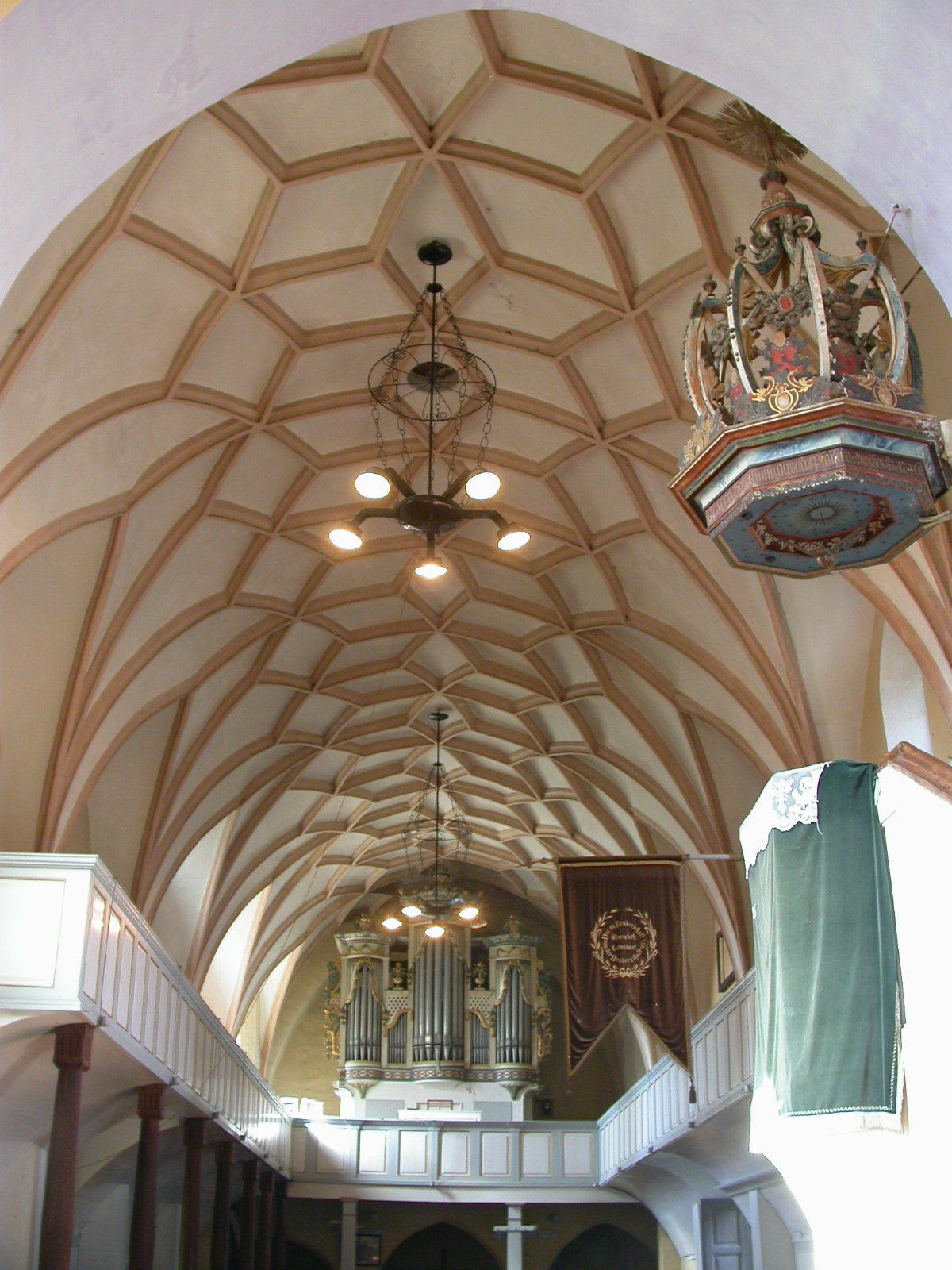
Ceiling

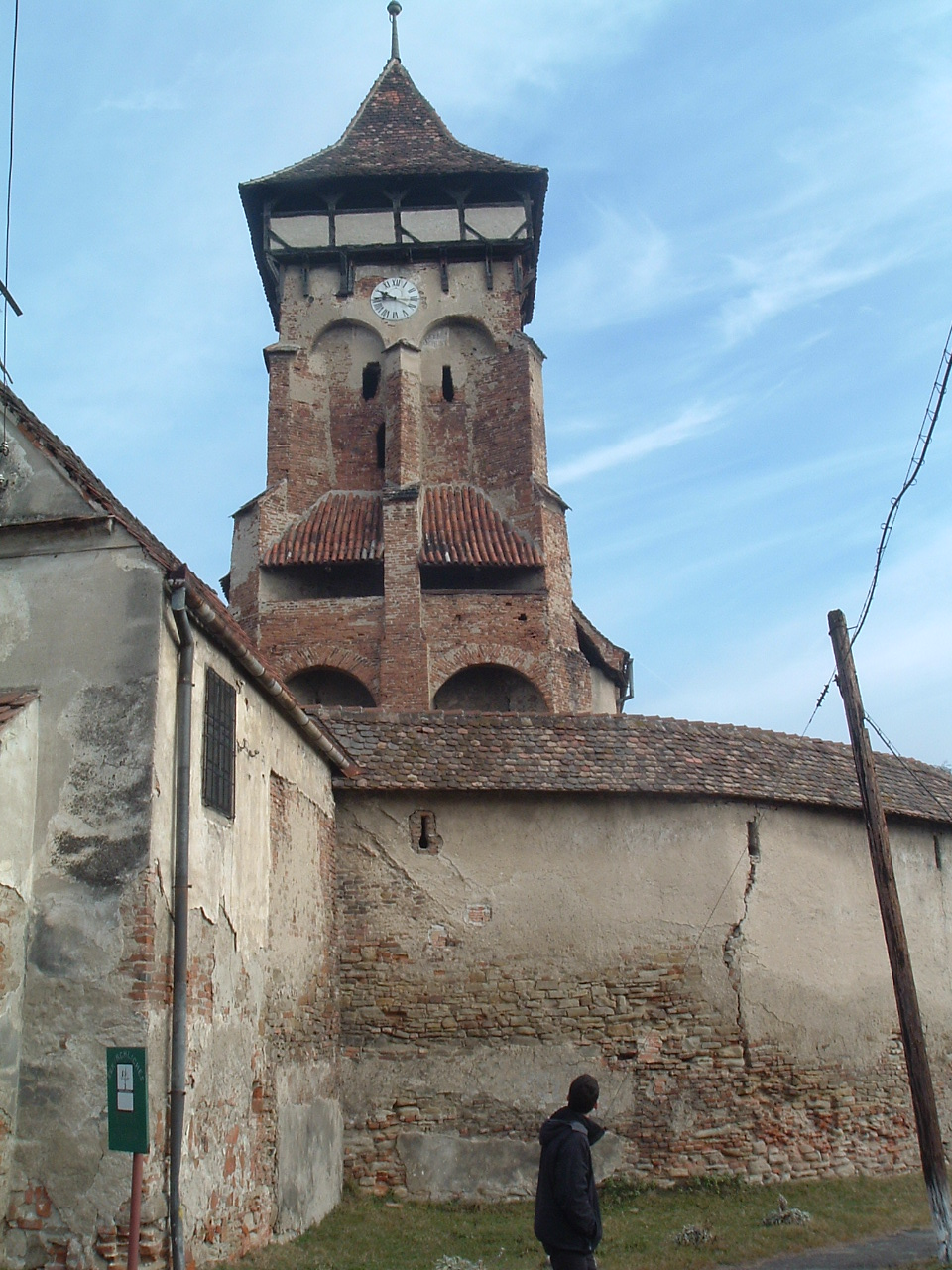
Choir tower

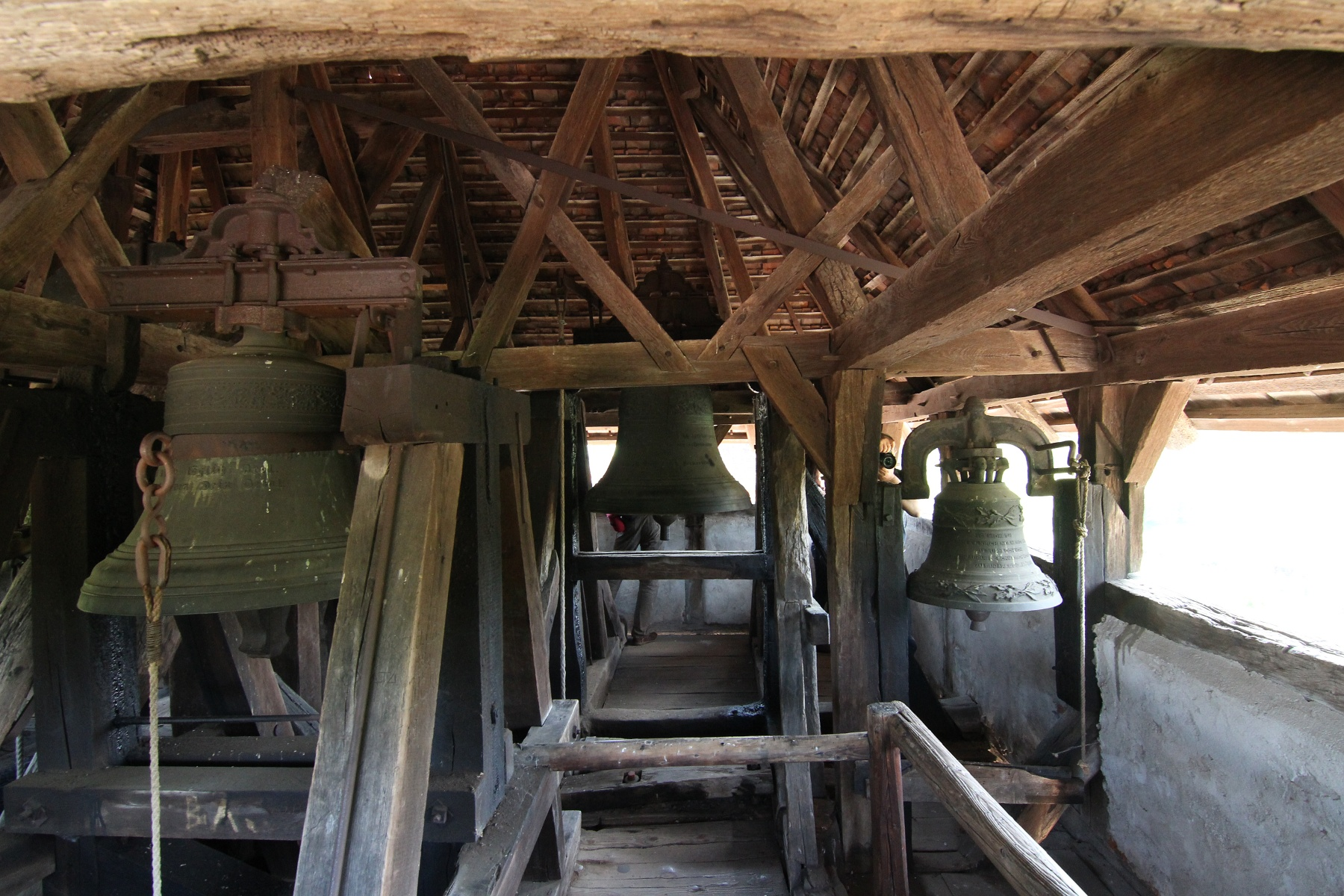
Belfry

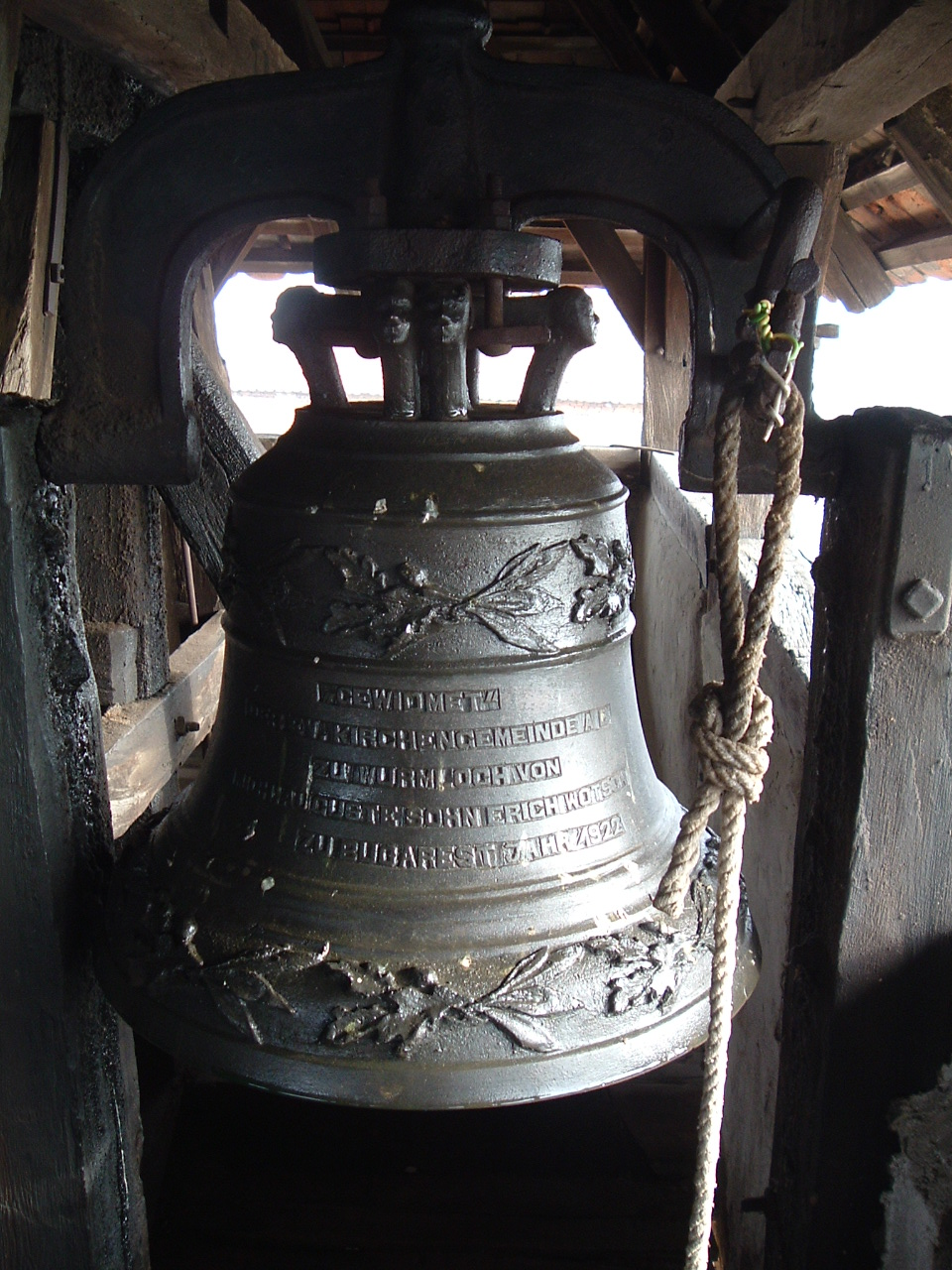
The bell

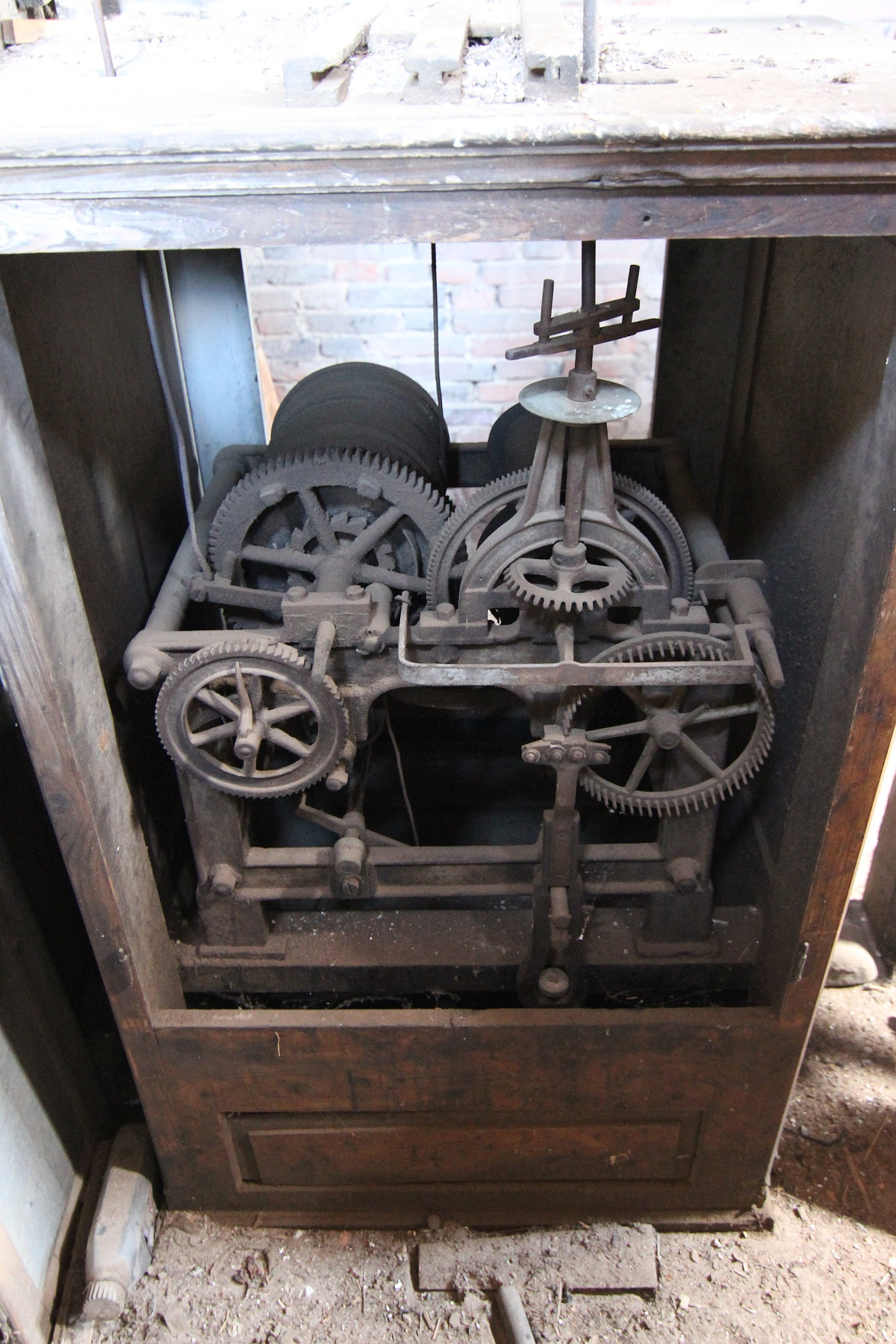
The clock mechanism
