= List of renamed cities in Ukraine =

Numerous cities in Ukraine have undergone name changes since 1 January 1986, based on the database of the Verkhovna Rada. Following the adoption of decommunization laws in 2015, the Verkhovna Rada has renamed numerous settlements and administrative units.

== Autonomous Republic of Crimea ==
- Albat → Kuibysheve (1945) → Albat (2023)
- Aluston → Lusta → Aluşta → Alushta (1784)
- As → Proletarka (1948) → As (2023)
- Ermeni Bazar → Armianskyi Bazar (1736) → Armiansk (1921)
- Komsomolskoye/Komsomolske → Baqaçıq Qıyat/Bakachyk-Kyiat (2023)
- Karasubazar → Bilohirsk (1944)
- Büyük Onlar → Oktiabrske (1945) → Büyük Onlar/Biuk-Onlar (2023)
- Aqmeçit → Chornomorske (1944)
- Dolossı → Sovietske → Dolossı/Dolossy (2023)
- Canköy → Dzhankoi (1784)
- Theodosia → Ardabda → Kafas → Caffa → Kefe (1475) → Feodosia (1784)
- Sarabuz → Hvardiiske (1944)
- İçki → Sovietskyi (1944) → İçki/Ichki (2023)
- Inkerman → Belokamensk (1976) → Inkerman (1991)
- İslâm Terek → Kirovske (1944) → İslâm Terek/Isliam Terek (2023)
- Kaygador → Provalnoe → Dvoiakornoie → Bubnovka → Ordzhonikidze (1937) → Kaygador/Kaihador (2023)
- Panticapaeum → Bosporus → Korchev → Vosporo/Cerchio → Kerch
- Qocalaq → Krasnoarmiiske (1948) → Kodzhalak (2023)
- Qızıltaş → Krasnokamianka (1945)
- Aşağı Otuz → Prymorie (1945) → Kurortne (1978)
- casalle Sichite → Nikita → Botanicheskoye (1971) → Nikita (1991)
- Seyitler → Nyzhniohirskyi (1944)
- Yañı Küçükköy → Parkove
- Or Qapı → Perekop (1736)
- Curçı → Pervomaiske (1944)
- Aşağı Kikineiz → Ponyzivka
- Bazarçıq → Poshtove (1945)
- Hafuz → Yuzhnaia Tochka (1938) → Prymorskyi (1952)
- Kurman-Kumelĉi → Krasnohvardiiske (1944) → Qurman/Kurman (2023)
- Aqşeyh → Rozdolne (1944)
- Saq → Saky (1784)
- Otuz → Shchebetovka (1944)
- Aqmescit → Simferopol (1784)
- Eski Qırım → Staryi Krym (1783)
- Sudaq → Sudak (1784)
- Bromzavod → Krasno-Perekopsk (1936) → Krasnoperekopsk (1964) → Yañı Qapı/Yany Kapu (2023)
- Yedi Quyu → Sem Kolodezey (1784) → Lenine (1957) → Yedi Quyu/Yedy Kuiu (2023)
- Kerkinitis → Kezlev (7th century) → Gözleve → Yevpatoria (1784)

== Chernihiv Oblast ==
- Snovsk → Shchors (1935) → Snovsk (2016)

== Dnipropetrovsk Oblast ==
- Yekaterinoslav → Novorossiysk (1797) → Yekaterinoslav (1802) → Dnipropetrovsk/Dnepropetrovsk (1926) → Dnipro (2016)
- Kamianske → Dniprodzerzhynsk (1936) → Kamianske (2016)
- Mykytyne → Slovyanske (1775) → Nikopol (1781)
- Samar → Novomoskovsk (1782) → Samar (2024)
- Shakhtarske → Pershotravensk (1960) → Shakhtarske (2024)
- Ordzhonikidze → Pokrov (2016)

== Donetsk Oblast ==
- Donetsko-Amvrosiyevka → Amvrosiivka (1938)
- Avdeyevka I & Avdeyevka II → Avdiivka (1956)
- Bakhmut → Artemivsk (1924) → Bakhmut (2016)
- Belozyorka → Bilozerske (1966)
- Ostheim → Telmanovo/Telmanove (1935) → Boikivske (2016)
- Bunge → Yunykh Komunarov (1924) → Yunokomunarovskoye (1965) → Yunokomunarivsk (1965) → Bunhe (2016)
- Alekseyevka → Alekseyevo-Leonovo (1857) → Chystyakove (1932) → Torez (1964) → Chystiakove (2016)
- Paraskoviivka & Erastovsky rudnik & Svyatogorovsky (Krasnoarmeysky, 1920) Rudnik → Dobropillia (1935)
- Yelenovskiye Karyery → Dokuchaievsk (1954)
- Yuzovka → Stalin (1924) → Stalino (1931) → Donetsk (1961)
- Sotsgorodok → Hirnyk (1958)
- Karakybbud → Komsomolske (1949) → Kalmiuske (2016)
- Nova Khrestovka → Kirovske (1958) → Khrestivka (2016)
- Kramatorskaya → Kramatorsk (1932)
- Kurakhovgresstroy → Kurakhovgres (1943) → Kurakhove (1956)
- Lyman → Krasnyi Lyman (1938) → Lyman (2016)
- Dmitriyevskoye → Dmitriyevsk (1925) → Makiivka (1931)
- Manhush → Pershotravneve (1946) → Manhush (1995)
- Pavlovsk → Mariupol (1779) → Zhdanov (1948) → Mariupol (1989)
- Grodovsky rudnik → Novy Donbass (1934) → Novoekonomichne (1957) → Dymytrov (1965) → Myrnohrad (2016)
- Gladky → Staronikolskoye (1855) → Nikolske → Volodarske (1924) → Nikolske (2016)
- Novonikolayevskaya → Budyonnovskaya (1923) → Budyonivsky (1938) → Novoazovsky (1959) → Novoazovsk (1966)
- Grodovka → Novohrodivka (1958)
- Grishino → Postysheve (1934) → Krasnoarmiiske (1938) → Krasnoarmiisk (1938) → Pokrovsk (2016)
- Selidovka/Selydivka → Selydove (1956)
- Alekseyevo-Orlovka & Olkhovchik → Katyk → Shakhtarsk (1953)
- Yama → Siversk (1973)
- Tor → Sloviansk (1784)
- Vasilyevka → Snezhnaya (1864) → Snizhne (1920)
- Bryantsevsky → Bryantsevka (1924) → Karla Libknekhta (1926) → Karlo-Libknekhtove (1965) & Bilokamyanske → Karlo-Libknekhtovsk (1965) → Soledar (1991)
- Bannoe → Banne (1929) → Bannovske (1938) → Slovianohirsk (1964) → Sviatohirsk (2003)
- Uglegorskoy TES → Svitlodarske (1969) → Svitlodarsk (1992)
- Shcherbinovka → Shcherbinovsky → Dzerzhynsk (1938) → Toretsk (2016)
- Lesovka → Ukrainsk (1963)
- Bolshoy Yanisol → Velyka Novosilka (1946)
- Khatsapetovka → Vuhlehirsk (1958)
- Yenakiyevo → Rykovo (1928) → Ordzhonikidze (1937) → Yenakiieve (1943)
- Nelepovsky → Artyoma (1921) → Artemove (1938) → Zalizne (2016)
- Novo-Zhdanovka → Zhdanov rudnik (1966) → Zhdanivka (1966)

== Ivano-Frankivsk Oblast ==
- Stanisławów (founded) → Stanislaviv (1939) → Ivano-Frankivsk (1962)
- Yaremcha → Yaremche (2006)

== Kharkiv Oblast ==
- Konstantingrad → Krasnohrad (1922) →Berestyn (2024)
- Lykhachove → Pervomaiskyi (1952) → Zlatopil (2024)
- Zmiiv → Zmeyev (1656) → Hotvald (1976) → Zmiiv (1990)

== Kherson Oblast ==
- Chapli → Askania (1828) → Askania-Nova (1835)
- Holy → Golaya Pristan (1786) → Hola Prystan (1923)
- Geniczi → Genichesk (1784) → Henichesk (1923)
- Oleshky → Alioshki (1802) → Tsiurupynsk (1928) → Oleshky (2016)
- Ali-Agok → Skadovskoye (1894) → Skadovsk (1933)

== Khmelnytskyi Oblast ==
- Liakhivtsi → Bilohiria (1949)
- Proskuriv → Khmelnytskyi (1954)

== Kirovohrad Oblast ==
- Hrushkivskyi Vysilok → Blahovishchenske (1921) → Ulianovka (1924) → Blahovishchenske (2016)
- Yelizavetgrad (1784) → Zinovyevsk (1924) → Kirovo (1934) → Kirovohrad (1939) → Kropyvnytskyi (2016)
- Khrushchev (1955) → Kremhes (1961) → Svitlovodsk (1969)

== Kyiv Oblast ==
- Chernobyl → Chornobyl
- Pereiaslav-Ruskyi → Pereiaslav → Pereiaslav-Khmelnytskyi (1943) → Pereiaslav (2019)

== Luhansk Oblast ==
- Yuryevka → Alchevsk (1903) → Voroshylovsk (1931) → Voroshylovsk/Alchevsk (1957) → Komunarsk (1961) → Alchevsk (1991)
- Izium → Almaznaya (1878) → Almazna (1977)
- Bokovo-Antratsyt → Antratsyt (1962)
- Vakhrushevo → Vakhrusheve → Bokovo-Khrustalne (2016)
- Dovzhykove-Orlovske/Sharapkyne → Sverdlovsk (1938) → Dovzhansk (2016)
- Gorskoye → Hirske (1938)
- Golubovka/Holubivka → Kirovsk (1944) → Holubivka (2016)
- Petrivka → Irmyne (1900) → Teplogorsk/Teplohirsk (1977) → Irmino (2010)
- Kadiyevka → Sergo (1937) → Kadiivka (1940) → Stakhanov (1978) → Kadiivka (2016)
- Kryndachiovka → Krasnyi Luch (1920) → Khrustalnyi (2016)
- Krynychansk mining town → Krasnogvardeyskiy/Krasnohvardiiskyi (1953) → Chervonogvradeyskoye/Chervonohvardiiske (1962) → Krynychanske (2016)
- Kundriuche → Kalininskyi (1957) → Kundriuche (2016)
- Yekaterinovka → Artem (1923) → Artemivsk (1938) → Kypuche (2016)
- Lugansk → Voroshylovhrad (1935) → Luhansk (1958) → Voroshylovhrad (1970) → Luhansk (1990)
- Aleksandrovka → Petro-Maryevka (1865) → Pervomaisk (1920) → Sokolohirsk (2024)
- Petrovo-Krasnosillia → Petrovskoye/Petrovske (1959) → Petrovo-Krasnosillia (2016)
- Sorokino → Krasnodon (1938) → Sorokyne (2016)
- Voznesenskyi & Mykolaivka & Vasylivka & Krasna Mohyla & Chervonyi Partyzan → Chervonopartyzanskyi (1956) → Chervonopartyzansk (1960) → Voznesenivka (2016)

== Lviv Oblast ==
- Krystynopol (founded) → Chervonograd/Chervonohrad (1951) → Chervonohrad (1991) → Sheptytskyi (2024)
- Dymoszyn (first mentioned) → Kamionka Strumiłowa (15th century) → Kamenka-Bugskaya/Kamianka-Buzka (1944) → Kamianka-Buzka (1991)
- Komarno → Komarne → Komarno (1992)
- Lviv → Lwów (1356) → (Lemberg) (1772) → Lwów (1918) → Lvov (1939) → Lemberg (1941) → Lvov (1944) → Lviv (1991)
- Yantarne → Novoiarovivske (1969) → Novoiavorivsk (2008)
- Novyi Rozdol → Novyi Rozdil (1992)
- Żółkiew (founded) → Zhovkva (1939) → Nesterov (1951) → Zhovkva (1992)

== Mykolaiv Oblast ==
- Fedorivka → Fiodorovka (1776) → Novaya Odessa (1832) → Nova Odesa (1989)
- Kara Kerman → Özi → Ochakov (1792) → Ochakiv (1989)
- Orlyk → Orlovsky sconce (1743) → Yekaterinsky sconce (1770) → Olviopol (1781) → Pervomaisk (1919)
- Konstantinovka-2 (founded) → Yuzhnoukrainsk (1987) → Pivdennoukrainsk (2024)

== Odesa Oblast ==
- Ophiussa → Tyras → Turis → Moncastro → Cetatea Albă (1391) → Akkerman (1503) → Cetatea Albă (1918) → Bilhorod-Dnistrovskyi (1944)
- Buh Khutirs → Illichivsk (1952) → Chornomorsk (2016)
- Hacibey → Odesa (rebuilt 1794)
- Birzula → Kotovsk (1935) → Podilsk (2016)
- Zakharivka → Frunzivka (1927) → Zakharivka (2016)
- Tarutyne → Bessarabske (2024)

== Poltava Oblast ==
- Komsomolsk-na-Dnipri (or simply Komsomolsk) → Horishni Plavni (2016)
- Stalinka → Chervonozavodske (1961) → Zavodske (2016)

== Rivne Oblast ==
- Radzylivy → Chervonoarmiysk (1939/40) → Radyvyliv (1992)
- Równo → Rovno → Rivne (1991)
- Hvarash → Varazh (or Varash, Variazh, Hvariazh) → Kuznetsovsk (1977) → Varash (2016)

== Sevastopol ==
- Kalamita → Inkerman (1475) → Belokamensk (1976) → Inkerman (1991)
- Aqyar → Sevastopol (1826; also: Sebastopol)

== Sumy Oblast ==
- Khutir-Mykhailivskyi → Druzhba (1962) → Khutir-Mykhailivskyi (2024)

== Ternopil Oblast ==
- Tarnopol (founded) → Ternopil (1939)

== Volyn Oblast ==
- Lutsk → Luchesk (1427) → Łuck (1569) → Lutsk (1795) → Mikhailogorod (1850) → Luck (1915) → Łuck (1919) → Lutsk (1939)
- Volodymer (founded) → Vladimir-Volynskiy (1795) → Volodymyr-Volynskyi (1991) → Volodymyr (2021)

== Zakarpattia Oblast ==
- Beregszasz → Beregovo → Berehove
- Munkács → Mukačevo (1919) → Munkács (1938) → Mukacheve (1945) → Mukachevo (2017)
- Zlatina (1360) → Aknaszlatina → Slatinské Doly (1919) → Solotvyna → Solotvyno (1995)
- Ungvár (1248) → Užhorod (1919) → Ungvár (1938) → Uzhhorod (1944)

== Zaporizhzhia Oblast ==
- Kamianka → Tsarekostiantynivka (1845) → Pershotravneve (1926) → Tsarekostiantynivka (1930) → Kuibyshevo/Kuibysheve (1935) → Bilmak (2016) → Kamianka (2021)
- Alexandrovsk → Zaporizhzhia (1921)

== Zhytomyr Oblast ==
- Oleksandropil → Horoshkovychi → Horoshky/Horoszki nad Irszą (1607) → Kutuzove (1912) → Volodarsk (1924) → Volodarsk-Volynskyi (1933) → Khoroshiv (2016)
- Chortolisy → Pulyny → Chervonoarmiisk/Krasnoarmeysk (1935) → Pulyny (2016)
- Zwiahel → Novohrad-Volynskyi (1795) → Zviahel (2022)

== See also ==
- List of Ukrainian toponyms that were changed as part of decommunization in 2016
- List of renamed cities in Belarus
- List of renamed cities in Moldova
- List of renamed cities and towns in Russia
- List of Ukrainian toponyms that were changed as part of derussification

== Source ==
- "6. Алфавітний покажчик нових і старих найменувань населених пунктів" [6. Alphabetical index of new and old names of settlements (1986—2021)]. Verkhovna Rada website. Archived from the original on 5 June 2021.
