= Valea Baciului =

Valea Naciului
- Location within Romania

Location
- Country: Romania
- Counties: Constanța County
- Villages: Abrud, Hațeg

Physical characteristics
- Mouth: Urluia
  - coordinates: 44.235°N 27.900°E
- Length: 39 km (24 mi)
- Basin size: 294 km^{2} (114 sq mi)

Basin features
- Progression: Urluia→ Danube→ Black Sea
- Tributaries
  - left: Deleni
- River code: XIV.1.40.2

The Valea Baciului is a right tributary of the river Urluia in Romania. It passes through Lake Baciului and flows into the Urluia near Rasova. Its length is 39 km (24 mi) and its basin size is 294 km^{2} (114 sq mi).
