= Cobadin =

- Commune
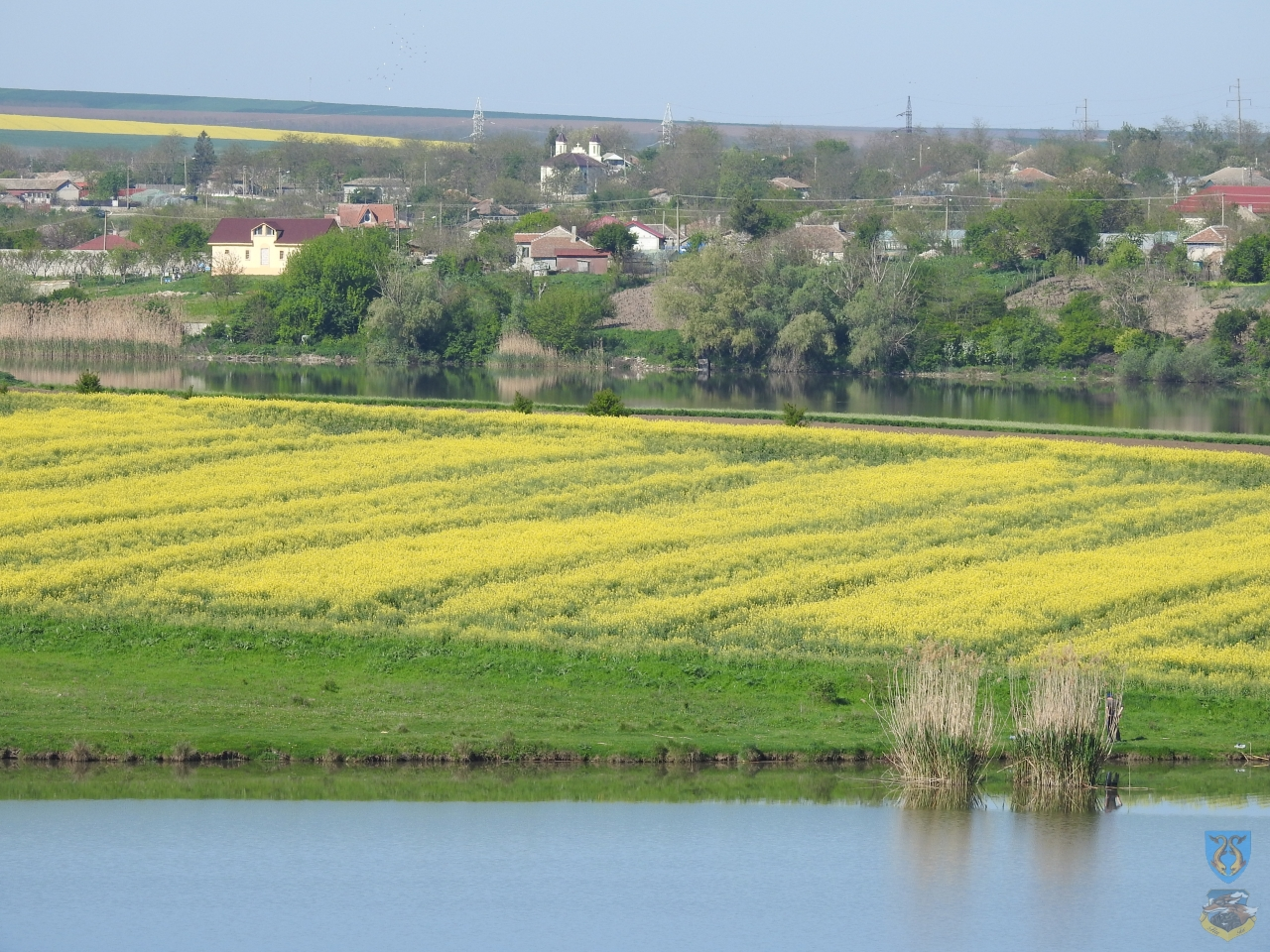
- View over Negrești in 2016

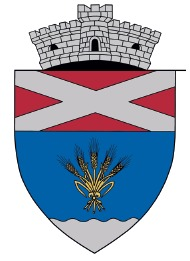
- Coat of arms

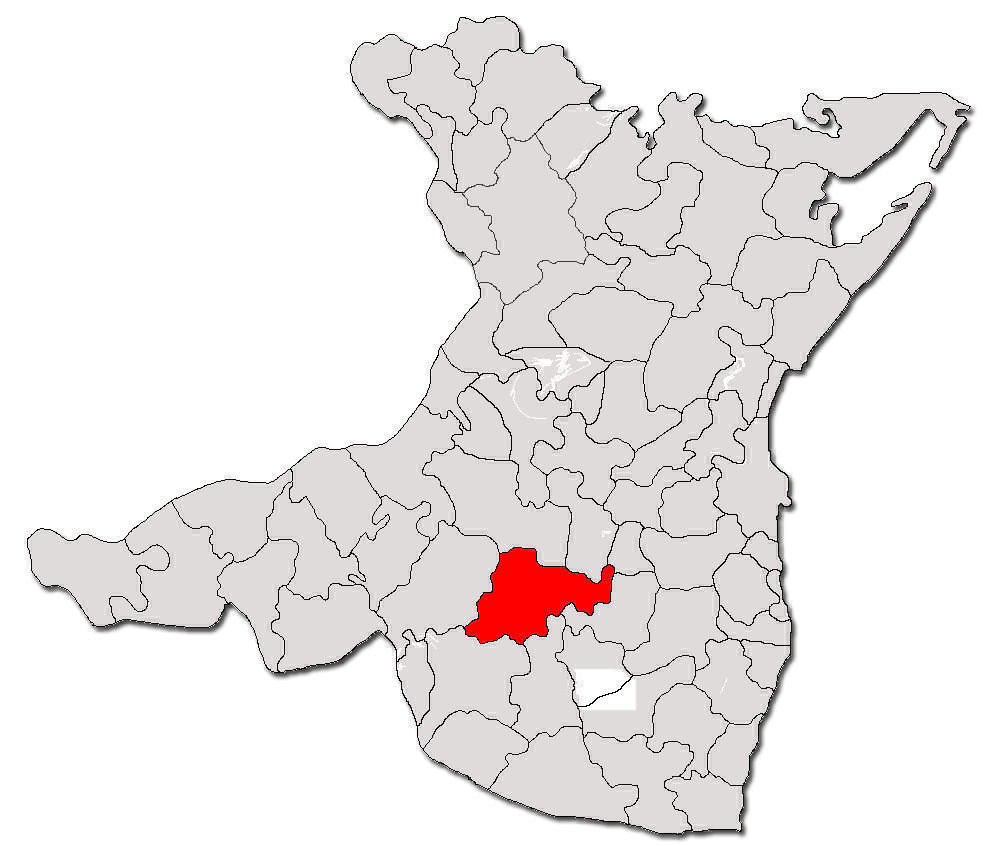
- Location in Constanța County

- Location in Romania
- Coordinates: 44°03′53″N 28°13′54″E
- Country: Romania
- County: Constanța
- Subdivisions: Cobadin, Viișoara, Negrești, Curcani, Conacu

Government
  - Mayor (2020–2024): Cristian Telehoi (PSD)
- Area: 188.41 km^{2} (72.75 sq mi)
- Elevation: 100 m (330 ft)
- Highest elevation: 130 m (430 ft)
- Lowest elevation: 72 m (236 ft)
- Population (2021-12-01): 9,122
  - Density: 48.42/km^{2} (125.4/sq mi)
- Time zone: UTC+02:00 (EET)
  - Summer (DST): UTC+03:00 (EEST)
- Postal code: 907065
- Area code: +(40) x41
- Vehicle reg.: CT
- Website: primariacobadin.ro

Cobadin (Romanian pronunciation: [kobaˈdin]) is a commune in Constanța County, Northern Dobruja, Romania. The commune includes five villages:

- Cobadin (historical names: Cobadinu, Turkish: Kobadin)
- Viișoara (historical name: Caciamac, Turkish: Kaçamak)
- Negrești (historical name: Carabacâ, Turkish: Karabağ')
- Conacu (historical name: Beșaul)
- Curcani (historical name: Chertic-Punar, Turkish: Kertikpınar) - disestablished by Presidential Decree before 1990, the village is nevertheless listed in the official settlements register

The territory of the commune also includes the former village of Frasinu (historical name: Terzi-Veli), at 43°59′14″N 28°6′16″E, nominally merged with Curcani by the 1968 administrative reform.

== Geography ==
Cobadin is situated at an altitude of about 100 m (330 ft), on the banks of the river Urluia (a right tributary of the Danube). The commune is located in the southern part of Constanța County, 40 km (25 mi) southwest of the county seat, the port city of Constanța. It is crossed by national road DN3, which starts in Bucharest, 222 km (138 mi) to the west, and ends in Constanța, on the Black Sea coast.

== History ==
Cobadin was originally a Turkish settlement. In 1862, 350 Tatar families who had been expelled from the Crimean Peninsula settled there. Following the war of 1877–78, Northern Dobruja was ceded to Romania under the Treaty of Berlin. Many Turks and Tatars emigrated. In their place, from 1890 onwards, Germans from Bessarabia moved in, because arable land was cheaper here than in Bessarabia and they had lost many of their privileges in their country of origin. The Germans formed their own German Protestant community, which managed its own church and school affairs. In 1914, the Medgidia–Bazardjik railway line came into operation, and Cobadin got its own railway station. Two battles were fought on the territory of the commune and in the surrounding area during World War I: the First Battle of Cobadin (September 17–19, 1916), and the Second Battle of Cobadin (October 19–25, 1916). During this period, many of the German residents were conscripted, and some were interned.

== Population ==
As of the 2011 census, the population of the commune was 8,346, out of which 6,480 (77.44%) were Romanians, 1,021 (12.23%) Turks, 442 (5.29%) Tatars, 359 (4.30%) Romani, 7 (0.08%) Aromanians, and 37 others. At the 2021 census, Cobadin had 9,122 inhabitants; of those, 71.77% were Romanians, 15.86% Turks, 4.05% Tatars, and 1.26% Romani.

== Natives ==
- Pericle Martinescu (1911 – 2005), writer and journalist
- Nicolae Ionescu-Pallas (1932 – 2017), nuclear physicist and honorary member of the Romanian Academy
- Virgil Teodorescu (1909 – 1987), writer and corresponding member of the Romanian Academy
