= Valea Viilor =

Valea Viilor Wurmloch (German)
- Commune
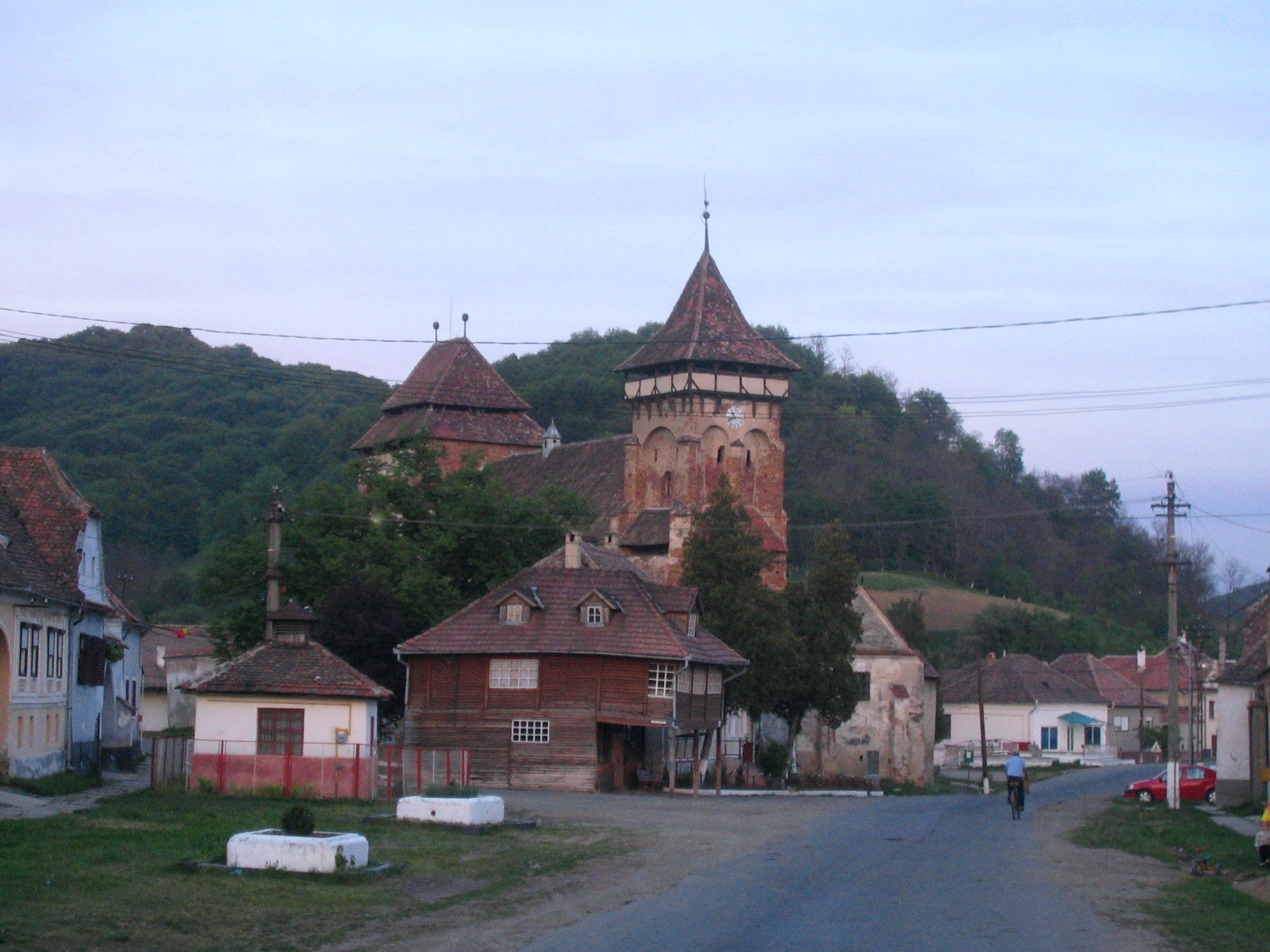
- Valea Viilor centre

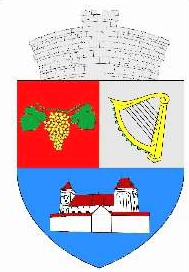
- Coat of arms

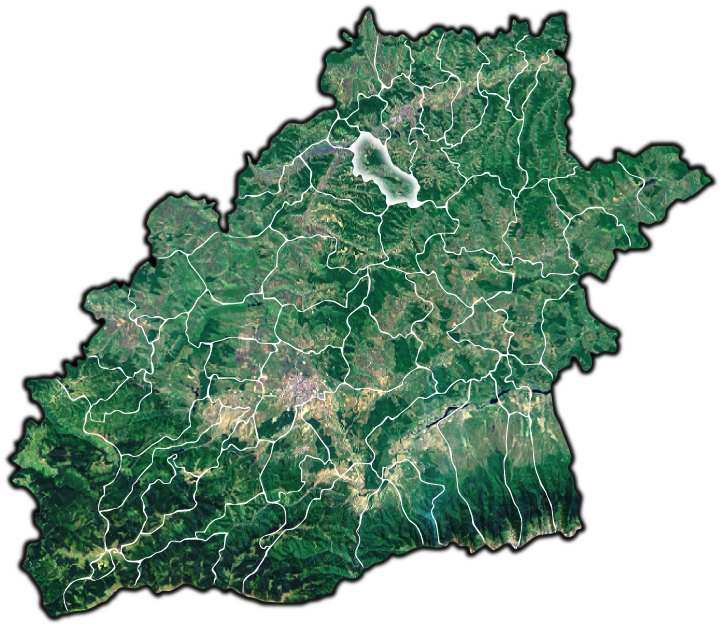
- Location in Sibiu County

- Location in Romania
- Coordinates: 46.0831°N 24.2769°E
- Country: Romania
- County: Sibiu

Government
  - Mayor (2024–2028): Ilie Avram Pinte (PSD)
- Area: 44.16 km^{2} (17.05 sq mi)
- Elevation: 331 m (1,086 ft)
- Population (2021-12-01): 1,962
  - Density: 44.43/km^{2} (115.1/sq mi)
- Time zone: UTC+02:00 (EET)
  - Summer (DST): UTC+03:00 (EEST)
- Postal code: 557290
- Area code: (+40) 02 69
- Vehicle reg.: SB
- Website: www.valea-viilor.ro

Valea Viilor (colloquially Vorumloc; German: Wurmloch; Hungarian: Nagybaromlak) is a commune located in Sibiu County, Transylvania, Romania. It has a population of 1,962 (as of 2021), and is composed of two villages, Motiș (Mortesdorf; Martontelke) and Valea Viilor. Each of these has a fortified church, Motiș fortified church and Valea Viilor fortified church. Both places were established and long inhabited by Transylvanian Saxons.

== Motiș ==
Motiș village was previously known in Romanian as Motișdorf and Motișul. Alternate German names include Märtesdorf and Mertesdorf. In Latin records, it is called Villa Morteni.

It was first mentioned in 1319 as the property of Saxon counts Niklaus and Johann von Talmisch. In 1415, Mortesdorf was first called by its sole German name "Gemeinde Martin". Serfdom was abolished in 1848. Saxons made up the majority of the village population for centuries until the 1980s. The community emigrated en masse, chiefly to Germany; at that point, Romanians and Roma became dominant. By 2006, just one Transylvanian Saxon resided in the village.

Historical population
Year	Pop.	±%
1850	1,161	—
1900	2,061	+77.5%
1941	2,607	+26.5%
1977	2,869	+10.0%
1992	1,915	−33.3%
2002	2,008	+4.9%
2011	1,873	−6.7%
2021	1,962	+4.8%
Source: Census data

== Natives ==
- Marțian Negrea (1893–1973), composer and academic

== See also ==
- Transylvanian Saxons
- Villages with fortified churches in Transylvania
- List of castles in Sibiu County

== Gallery ==
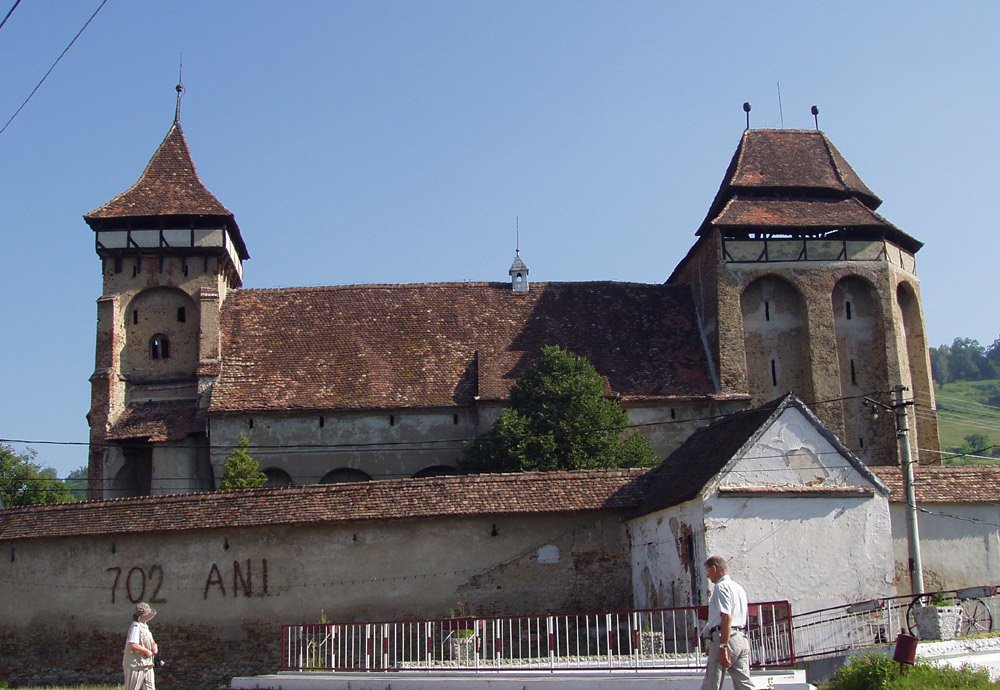
Valea Viilor fortified church

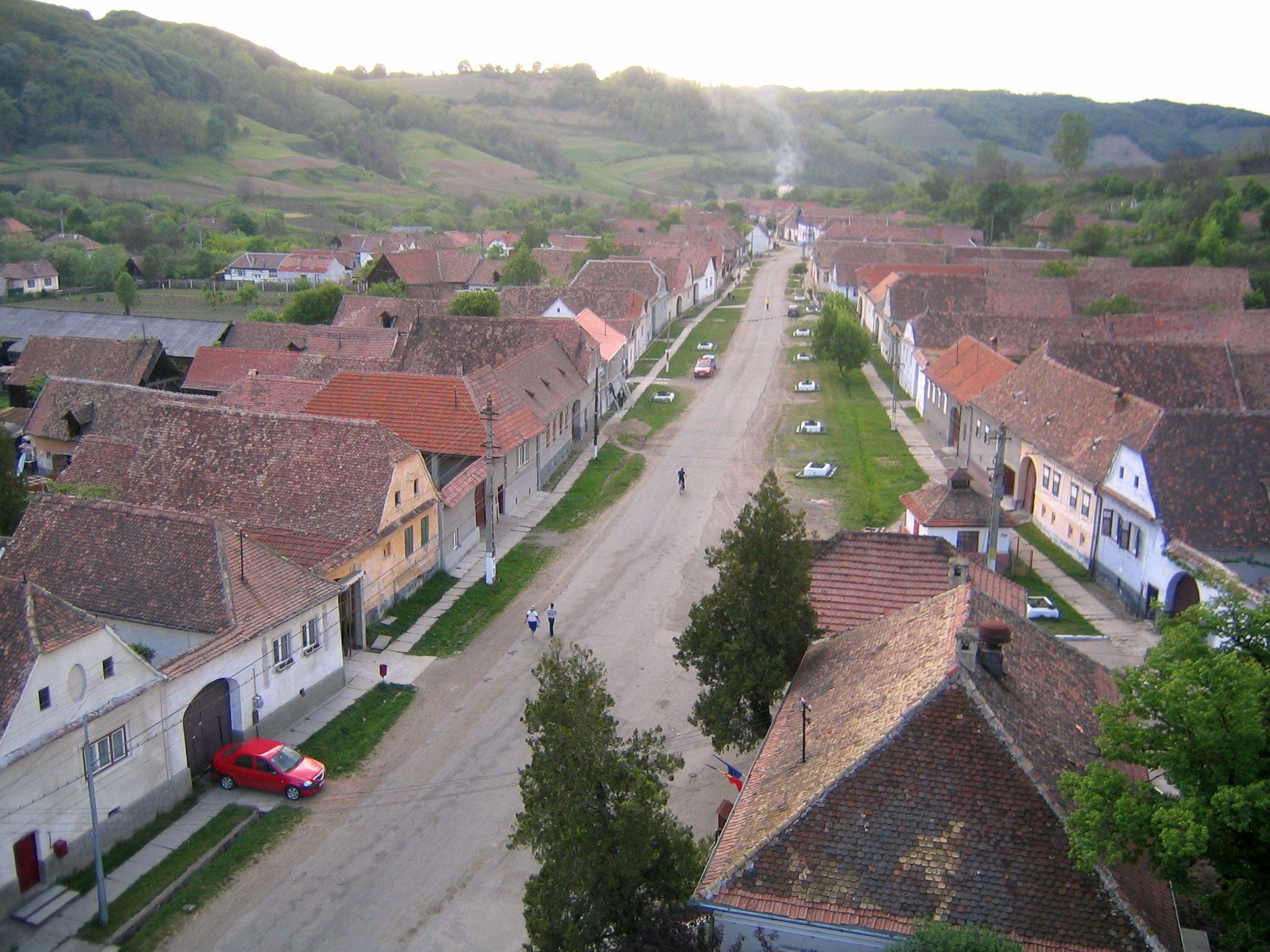
View from the fortified church tower

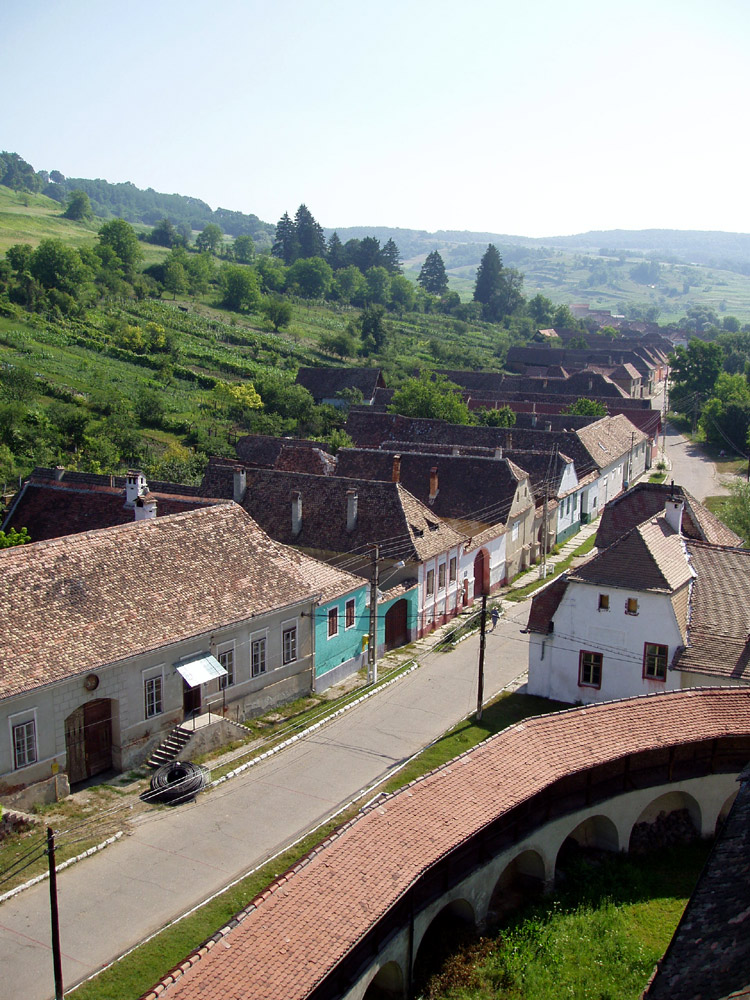
Street, with fortified church wall visible

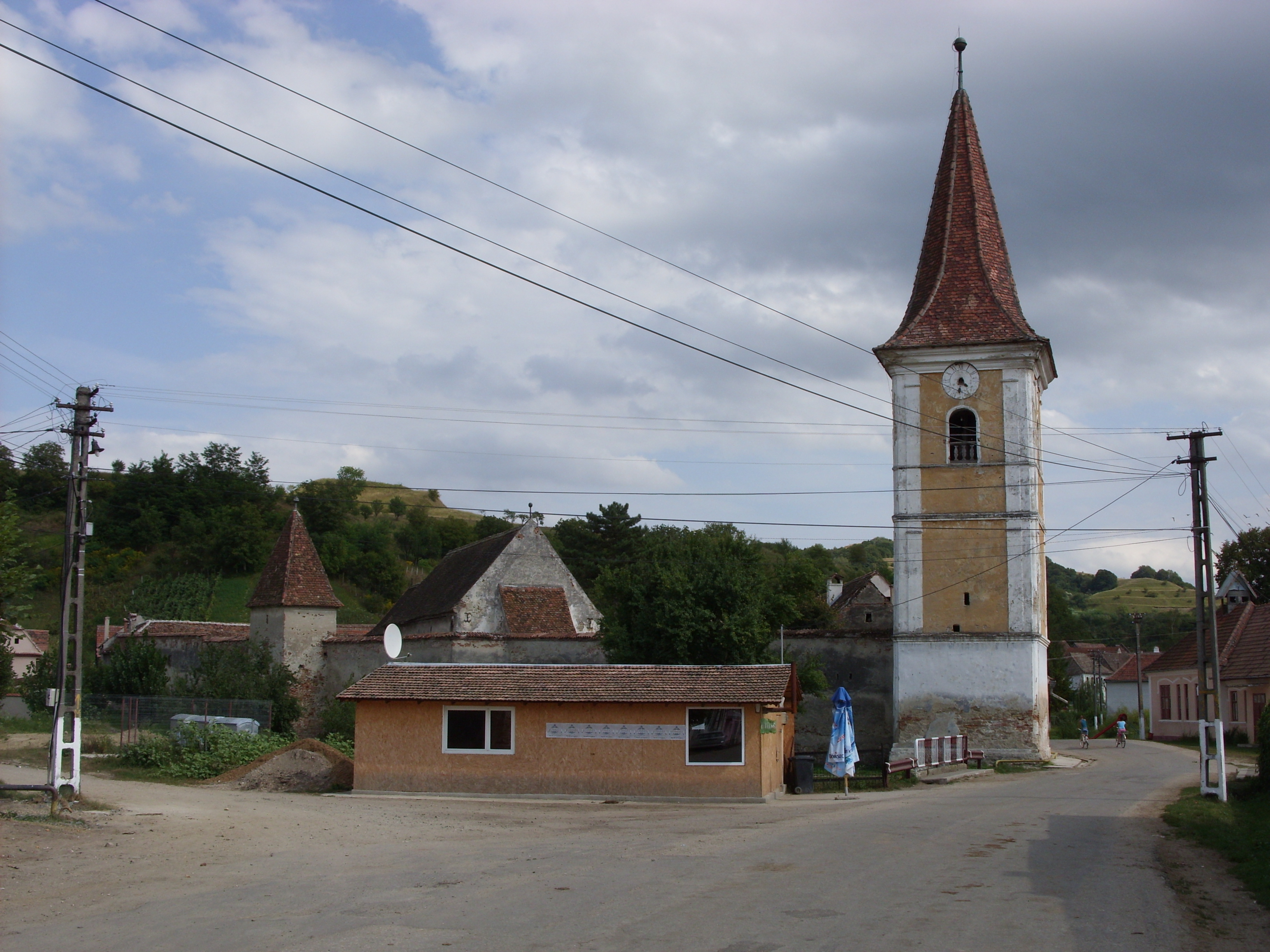
Fortified church of Motiș
