= Albinețul Vechi =

- Commune
- Location within Moldova
- Coordinates: 47.5541666667°N 27.6363888889°E
- Country: Moldova
- District: Fălești

Government
  - Mayor: cebotari boris
- Elevation: 58–61 m (190–200 ft)

Population (2014)
  - Total: 2,423
- Time zone: UTC+2 (EET)
  - Summer (DST): UTC+3 (EEST)

Albinețul Vechi is a commune in Fălești District, Moldova. It is composed of four villages: Albinețul Nou, Albinețul Vechi, Rediul de Jos and Rediul de Sus.
