= Iliciovca =

- Commune
- Location within Moldova
- Coordinates: 47.9355555556°N 28.0697222222°E
- Country: Moldova
- District: Florești District

Population (2014)
  - Total: 1,320
- Time zone: UTC+2 (EET)
  - Summer (DST): UTC+3 (EEST)

Iliciovca is a commune in Florești District, Moldova. It is composed of two villages, Iliciovca and Maiscoe.
