= Deleni, Constanța =

Deleni
- Commune
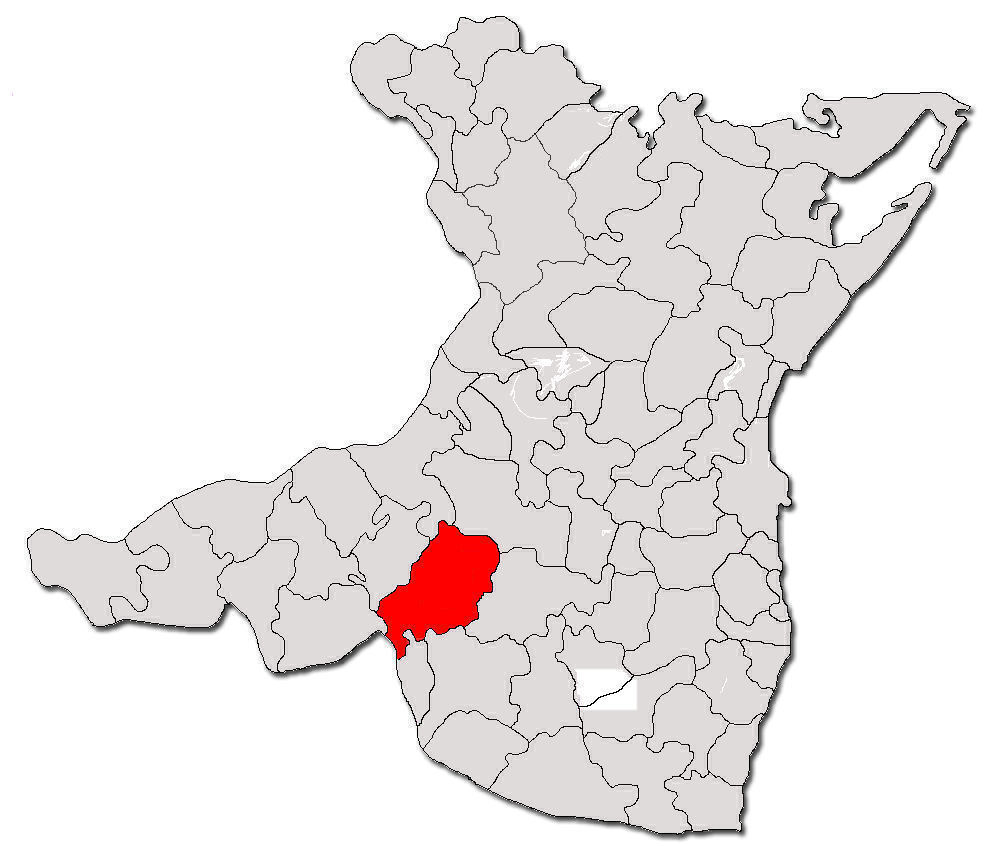
- Location in Constanța County

- Location in Romania
- Coordinates: 44°6′N 28°1′E
- Country: Romania
- County: Constanța
- Subdivisions: Deleni, Petroșani, Pietreni, Șipotele

Government
  - Mayor (2020–2024): Marian Dan (PSD)
- Area: 178.88 km^{2} (69.07 sq mi)
- Elevation: 122 m (400 ft)
- Population (2021-12-01): 2,223
  - Density: 12.43/km^{2} (32.19/sq mi)
- Time zone: UTC+02:00 (EET)
  - Summer (DST): UTC+03:00 (EEST)
- Postal code: 907110
- Vehicle reg.: CT
- Website: www.primariadeleniconstanta.ro

Deleni (Romanian pronunciation: [deˈlenʲ]) is a commune in Constanța County, Northern Dobruja, Romania. It is situated in the southern part of the county, 59 km (37 mi) west of Constanța.

The villages comprising the commune are:

- Deleni (historical name: Ienidja, Enigea or Enige; Turkish: Yenice)
- Petroșani (historical names: Chioseler, Turkish: Köseler)
- Pietreni (historical names: Cocargea until 1964, Turkish: Kokarca)
- Șipotele (historical names: Ghiolpunar, Turkish: Gölpınar)

The territory of the commune also includes the former villages of Poenița (historical name: Borungea, Turkish: Borunca), located at 44°0′55″N 28°0′38″E, disestablished by Presidential Decree in 1977, and Furca (historical name: Becter), located at 43°59′51″N 28°4′18″E.

== Demographics ==
At the 2021 census, Deleni had 2,388 inhabitants. At the 2011 census, there were 2,272 Romanians (98.31%), 10 Turks (0.43%), 28 Tatars (1.21%), 1 other (0.04%).

== Climate ==
Deleni has a Humid Subtropical Climate (Cfa). It receives the most abundant rainfall in June, with an average precipitation of 69 mm; and the most scarce rainfall in February, with an average precipitation of 38 mm.

Climate data for Pietreni
Month	Jan	Feb	Mar	Apr	May	Jun	Jul	Aug	Sep	Oct	Nov	Dec	Year
Mean daily maximum °C (°F)	4.0 (39.2)	6.7 (44.1)	11.5 (52.7)	16.5 (61.7)	22.0 (71.6)	26.0 (78.8)	28.6 (83.5)	28.9 (84.0)	23.5 (74.3)	17.2 (63.0)	12.0 (53.6)	6.3 (43.3)	16.9 (62.5)
Daily mean °C (°F)	0.4 (32.7)	2.4 (36.3)	6.5 (43.7)	11.3 (52.3)	16.7 (62.1)	21.2 (70.2)	23.6 (74.5)	23.5 (74.3)	18.5 (65.3)	12.7 (54.9)	8.0 (46.4)	2.5 (36.5)	12.3 (54.1)
Mean daily minimum °C (°F)	−3.0 (26.6)	−1.5 (29.3)	1.9 (35.4)	6.1 (43.0)	11.3 (52.3)	15.8 (60.4)	18.2 (64.8)	18.1 (64.6)	13.8 (56.8)	8.7 (47.7)	4.6 (40.3)	−0.7 (30.7)	7.8 (46.0)
Average rainfall mm (inches)	47 (1.9)	38 (1.5)	51 (2.0)	50 (2.0)	63 (2.5)	69 (2.7)	50 (2.0)	42 (1.7)	55 (2.2)	50 (2.0)	44 (1.7)	46 (1.8)	605 (24)
Source: Climate-Data.org

== Pietreni ==
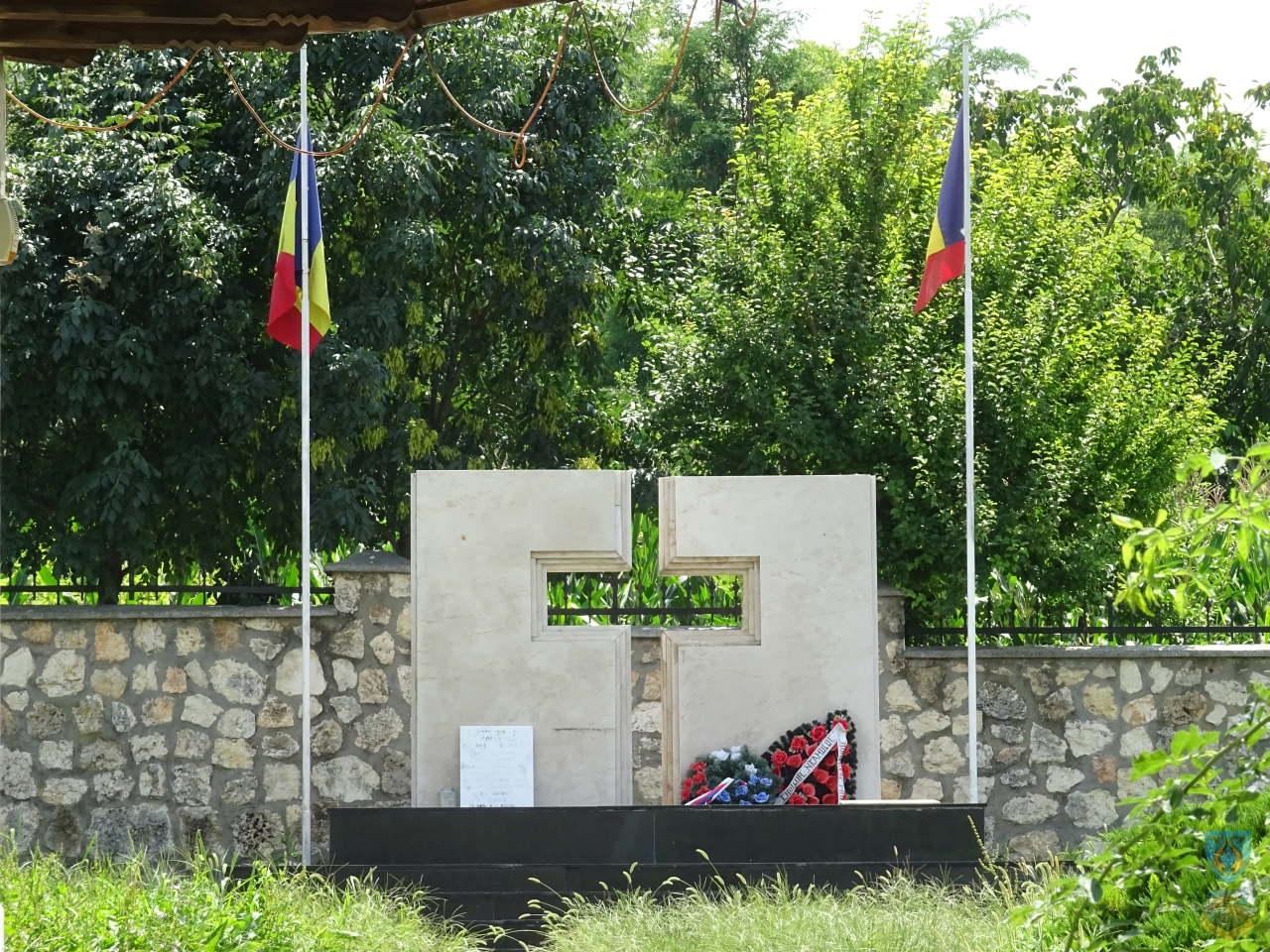
Heroes’ monument in Pietreni

At the 2021 census, Pietreni village had a population of 799.

Pietreni is situated along National Road 3, about 47 km (29 mi) west of the county seat, Constanța. It has an average elevation of 122 m (400 ft) above sea level.
