= Ghetlova =

- Commune and village
- Location in Moldova
- Coordinates: 47°22′N 28°32′E
- Country: Moldova
- District: Orhei District

Population (2014)
  - Total: 2,522
- Time zone: UTC+2 (EET)
  - Summer (DST): UTC+3 (EEST)

Ghetlova is a commune in Orhei District, Moldova. It is composed of three villages: Ghetlova, Hulboaca and Noroceni.
