= Mereni, Constanța =

Mereni
- Commune
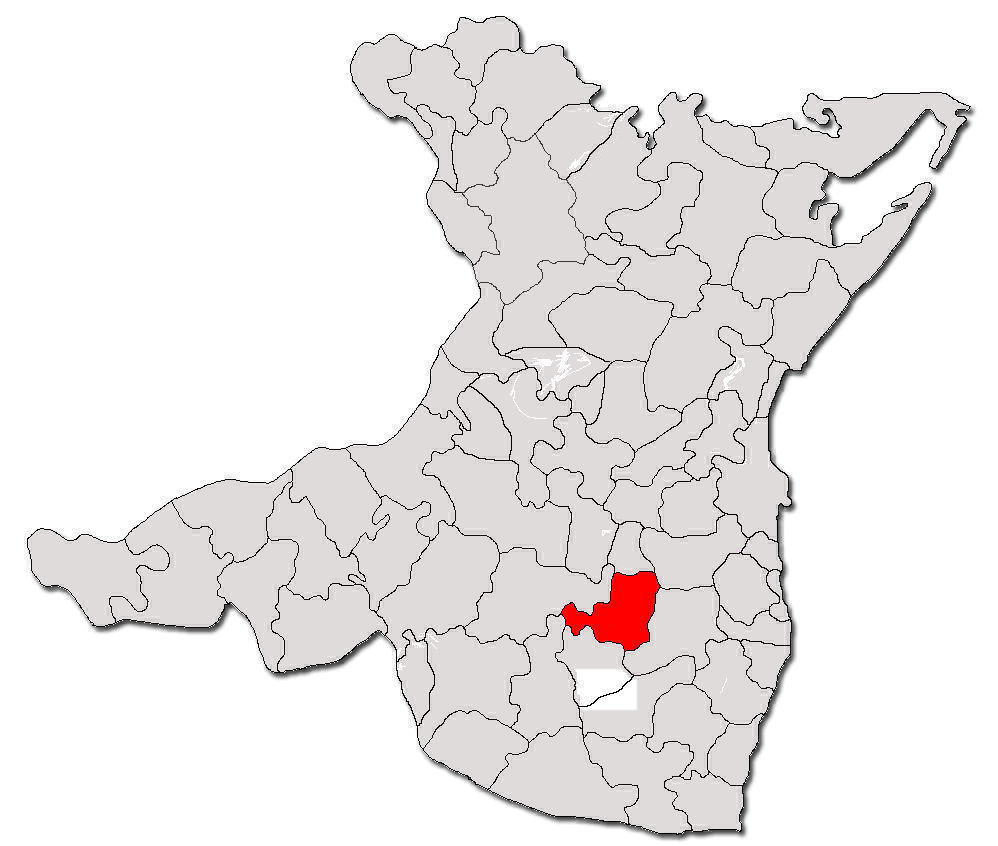
- Location in Constanța County

- Location in Romania
- Coordinates: 44°1′54″N 28°22′57″E
- Country: Romania
- County: Constanța
- Subdivisions: Mereni, Osmancea, Ciobănița, Miriștea

Government
  - Mayor (2020–2024): Dumitru Guriță (PNL)
- Area: 66.14 km^{2} (25.54 sq mi)
- Population (2021-12-01): 2,054
  - Density: 31.06/km^{2} (80.43/sq mi)
- Time zone: UTC+02:00 (EET)
  - Summer (DST): UTC+03:00 (EEST)
- Vehicle reg.: CT
- Website: www.primaria-mereni.ro

Mereni (Romanian pronunciation: [meˈrenʲ]) is a commune in Constanța County, Northern Dobruja, Romania. The commune includes four villages:

- Mereni (historical name: Enghe-Mahale, Turkish: Enge-Mahale)
- Osmancea (historical name: Turkish: Osmançay)
- Ciobănița (historical names: Agemler, Turkish: Acemler, German: Adschemler/Atschemler)
- Miriștea (historical names: Edilchioi, Turkish: Edilköy)

The former village of Lungeni (historical name: Uzunlar) was merged with the village of Mereni by the 1968 administrative reform.

== Demographics ==
At the 2011 census, Mereni had 1,920 Romanians (90.14%), 28 Roma (1.31%), 5 Turks (0.23%), 177 Tatars (8.31%).
