= Independența, Constanța =

Independența
- Commune
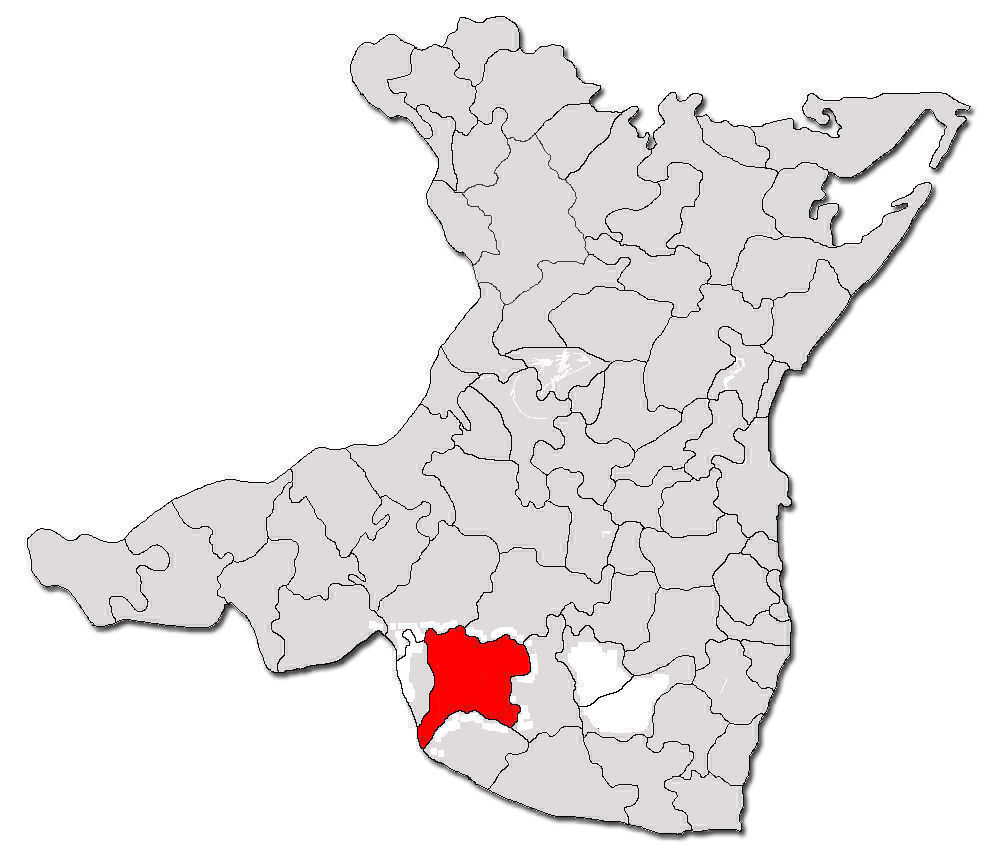
- Location in Constanța County

- Location in Romania
- Coordinates: 43°58′N 28°5′E
- Country: Romania
- County: Constanța
- Subdivisions: Independența, Fântâna Mare, Movila Verde, Olteni, Tufani

Government
  - Mayor (2020–2024): Cristea Gâscan (PSD)
- Area: 177.90 km^{2} (68.69 sq mi)
- Population (2021-12-01): 2,595
  - Density: 14.59/km^{2} (37.78/sq mi)
- Time zone: UTC+02:00 (EET)
  - Summer (DST): UTC+03:00 (EEST)
- Vehicle reg.: CT
- Website: www.primariaindependenta-ct.ro

Independența (Romanian pronunciation: [indepenˈdent͡sa]) is a commune in Constanța County, Northern Dobruja, Romania. It includes five villages:

- Independența (historical name: Bairamdede, Turkish: Bayramdede)
- Fântâna Mare (historical name: Bașpunar, Turkish: Başpınar)
- Movila Verde (historical names: Fetești, Turkish: Kızıl Murat)
- Olteni (historical names: Demircea, Turkish: Demirci)
- Tufani (historical names: Cara Agi, Turkish: Karacy)

The commune also included the villages of Periș (historical name: Armutlia), located at 43.873°N 27.999°E, and Căciulați (historical name: Cealmagea), located at 43.9°N 28.0333°E, which were nominally merged with Olteni by the 1968 administrative reform and are currently deserted.

== Demographics ==
At the 2011 census, Independența had 2,333 Romanians (74.8%), 392 Turks (12.6%), 271 Tatars (8.7%), 4 others (0.1%).
