= Dumbrăveni, Constanța =

Dumbrăveni
- Commune
- Coat of arms

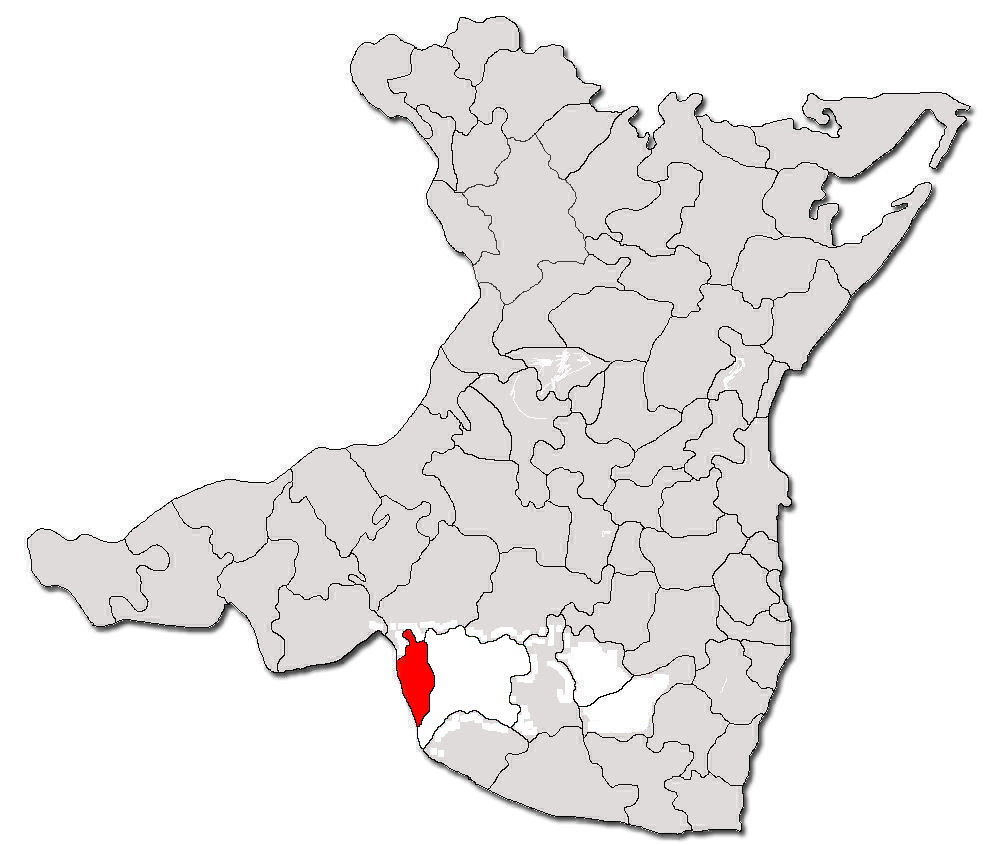
- Location in Constanța County

- Location in Romania
- Coordinates: 43°56′N 27°59′E
- Country: Romania
- County: Constanța
- Subdivisions: Dumbrăveni, Furnica

Government
  - Mayor (2024–2028): Luminița Șandru (PNL)
- Area: 52.40 km^{2} (20.23 sq mi)
- Population (2021-12-01): 453
  - Density: 8.65/km^{2} (22.4/sq mi)
- Time zone: UTC+02:00 (EET)
  - Summer (DST): UTC+03:00 (EEST)
- Vehicle reg.: CT
- Website: www.primaria-dumbraveni.ro

Dumbrăveni (Romanian pronunciation: [dumbrəˈvenʲ]) is a commune in Constanța County, Northern Dobruja, Romania.

The commune includes two villages:

- Dumbrăveni (historical name: Hairanchioi, Turkish: Hayranköy)
- Furnica (historical name: Şchender, Turkish: İskender)

== Demographics ==
At the 2011 census, Dumbrăveni had 513 Romanians (99.23%), 4 others (0.77%).
