= Islam in Romania =

Islam in Europe by percentage of country population 95–100%: Azerbaijan; 90–95%: Turkey; Kosovo; 50–70%: Albania; Bosnia and Herzegovina; Kazakhstan; 30–35%: North Macedonia; 10–20%: Russia; France; Georgia; Montenegro; 5–10%: Austria; Bulgaria; Sweden; Belgium; Germany; Liechtenstein; Netherlands; Switzerland; United Kingdom; Denmark; Luxembourg; 4–5%: Serbia; 2–4%: Italy; Finland; Norway; Malta; Slovenia; Spain; Greece; Cyprus (Note: Only takes into account the Muslim population residing on land controlled by the Republic of Cyprus.); 1–2%: Croatia; Ireland; Ukraine; Andorra; < 1%: Iceland; Armenia; Belarus; Czech Republic; Estonia; Hungary; Latvia; Lithuania; Moldova; Monaco; Poland; Portugal; Romania; San Marino; Slovakia

Islam in Romania is followed by only 0.4 percent of the population, but has 700 years of tradition in Northern Dobruja, a region on the Black Sea coast which was part of the Ottoman Empire for almost five centuries (ca. 1420-1878). In present-day Romania, most adherents to Islam belong to the Tatar and Turkish ethnic communities and follow the Sunni doctrine. The Islamic religion is one of the 18 rites awarded state recognition.

According to tradition, Islam was first established locally around Sufi leader Sari Saltik during the Byzantine epoch. The Islamic presence in Northern Dobruja was expanded by Ottoman overseeing and successive immigration, but has been in steady decline since the late 19th century. In Wallachia and Moldavia, the two Danubian Principalities, the era of Ottoman suzerainty was not accompanied by a growth in the number of Muslims, whose presence there was always marginal. Also linked to the Ottoman Empire, groups of Islamic colonists in other parts of present-day Romania were relocated by the Habsburg expansion or by various other political changes.

After Northern Dobruja became part of Romania following the Russo-Turkish War of 1877–1878, the community preserved its self-determining status. This changed during the communist regime, when Romanian Muslims were subject to a measure of supervision by the state, but the group again emancipated itself after the Romanian Revolution of 1989. Its interests are represented by the Muftiyat (Muftiyatul Cultului Musulman din România), which was created as the reunion of two separate such institutions.

== Demographics and organization ==
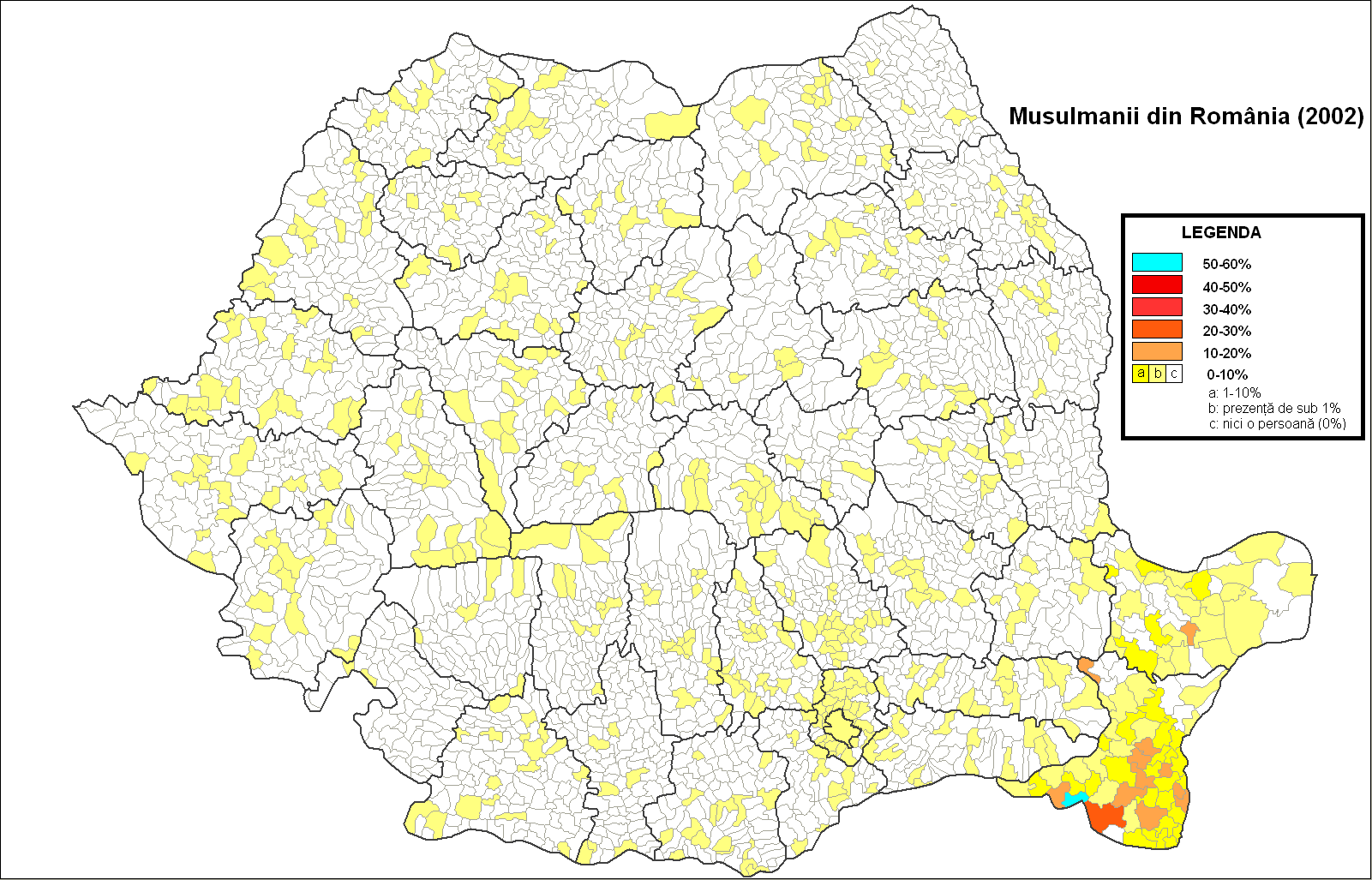
Percentage of Muslims by settlement, 2002

According to the 2022 census, 76,215 people, approximately 0.4% of the total population, indicated that their religion was Islam, marking an increase from 2011, when 64,337 people declared adherence to Islam. The vast majority of Romania's Muslims are Sunnis who adhere to the Hanafi school. Ethnically, they are mostly Tatars (Crimean Tatars and a lesser number of Nogais), followed by Turks, as well as Muslim Roma (as many as 15,000 people by one estimate), Albanians (as many as 3,000), and groups of Middle Eastern immigrants. Members of the Muslim community inside the Roma minority are colloquially known as "Turkish Roma". Traditionally, they are less religious than people belonging to other Islamic communities, and their culture mixes Islamic customs with Roma social norms.

Ninety-seven percent of the Romanian Muslims are residents of the two counties forming Northern Dobruja: eighty-five percent live in Constanța County, and twelve percent in Tulcea County. The rest mainly inhabit urban centers such as Bucharest, Brăila, Călărași, Galați, Giurgiu, and Drobeta-Turnu Severin. A single municipality, Dobromir, has a Muslim majority.

In all, Romania has as many as eighty mosques, or, according to records kept by the Romanian Ministry of Culture and Religious Affairs, seventy-seven. The city of Constanța, with its Grand Mosque of Constanța and the location of the Muftiyat, is the center of Romanian Islam; Mangalia, near Constanța, is the site of a monumental mosque, built in 1575 (see Esmahan Sultan Mosque). The two mosques are state-recognized historical monuments, as are the ones in Hârșova, Amzacea, Babadag and Tulcea, together with the Babadag tombs of two popularly revered Sufi sheikhs—the supposed tomb of dervish Sari Saltik and that of Gazi Ali Pașa. There are also 108 Islamic cemeteries in Romania.

The nationwide Islamic community is internally divided into 50 local groups of Muslims, each of whom elects its own leadership committee. Members provide funding for the religious institution, which is supplemented by state donations and subsidies, as well by assistance from international Islamic organizations.

The Muslim clergy in Romania includes imams, imam-hatips, and muezzins. As of 2008, the Ministry of Culture and Religious Affairs recognizes 35 imams. The Constanța Mufti, who is the community's main representative, is elected by a secret ballot from among the imams. He is assisted by a synodal body, the Sura Islam, which comprises 23 members and offers advice on matters of administration and discipline. The current Mufti is Murat Iusuf.

== History ==
=== Early presence ===
The first significant numbers of Muslims arrived in Romania with the Pechenegs and Cumans. Around 1061, when the Pechenegs ruled in Wallachia and Moldavia, there was a Muslim minority among them, as was among the Cumans. The Cumans followed the Pechenegs in 1171, while the Hungarian kings settled the Pechenegs in Transylvania and other parts of their kingdom.

Muslim presence is traditional in Dobruja, and partly predates both Ottoman rule and the creation of the neighboring Danubian Principalities. Both the Pechenegs and Cumans were present in the area, where they probably established a number of small communities. Around 1260, two Rûm Seljuq community leaders, the deposed Sultan Kaykaus II and the mystic Sari Saltik, were allowed to settle the region during the reign of Michael VIII Palaiologos, ruler of the Byzantine Empire. Kaykaus, who arrived in Dobruja with his brother and co-ruler Kilij Arslan IV, was reportedly followed by as many as 12,000 of his subjects. Researchers such as Franz Babinger and Gheorghe I. Brătianu endorse the view that Saltuk and his followers were in fact crypto-Shiite Alevis who were regarded as apostates by the dominant Sunni group of central Anatolia, and who sought refuge from persecution.

The exact location of their earliest area of settlement is disputed: a group of historians proposes that the group was probably tasked with defending the Byzantine border to the north, and settled in and around what later became known as Babadag, while another one centers this presence on the Southern Dobrujan strip of land known as Kaliakra (presently in Bulgaria). In addition, various historians argue that this Seljuq migration was the decisive contributor to the ethnogenesis of the Gagauz people, which, some of them believe, could also have involved the Cumans, Pechenegs, Oghuz and other Turkic peoples. The Gagauz, few of whom have endured in Dobruja, are majority Eastern Orthodox, a fact which was attributed to a process of religious conversion from Islam.

The presence of Tatars was notably attested through the works of Berber traveler Ibn Battuta, who passed through the area in 1334. In Ibn Battuta's time, the region was regarded as a westernmost possession of the Tatar Golden Horde, a khanate centered on the Eurasian Steppe. Archeology has uncovered that another Tatar group, belonging to the Golden Horde, came to Dobruja during the rule of Nogai Khan, and were probably closely related to the present-day Nogais. Following Timur's offensives, the troops of Aktai Khan visited the region in the mid-14th century and around 100,000 Tatars settled there.

Before and after the Golden Horde fell, Dobrujan Muslims, like the Crimean Tatars, were recipients of its cultural influences, and the language in use was Kipchak. The extension of Ottoman rule, effected under Sultans Bayezid I and Mehmed I, brought the influence of Ottoman Turkish, as Dobruja was added to the Beylerbeylik of Rumelia.

The grave of Sari Saltik, reportedly first erected into a monument by Sultan Bayezid, has since endured as a major shrine in Romanian Islam. The shrine, which has been described as a cenotaph, is one of many places where the Sheikh is supposed to be buried: a similar tradition is held by various local communities throughout the Balkans, who argue that his tomb is located in Kaliakra, Babaeski, Blagaj, Edirne, the Has District, Krujë, or Sveti Naum. Other accounts hold that Saltuk was buried in the Anatolian city of İznik, in Buzău, Wallachia, or even as far south as the Mediterranean island of Corfu or as far north as the Polish city of Gdańsk. The toponym Babadağ (Turkish for "Old Man's Mountain", later adapted into Romanian as Babadag) is a probable reference to Sari Saltik, and a Dobrujan Muslim account recorded by chronicler Evliya Çelebi in the late 15th century has it that the name surfaced soon after a Christian attack partly destroyed the tomb.

The oldest madrasah in Dobruja and Romania as a whole was set up in Babadag, on orders from Bayezid II (1484); it was moved to Medgidia in 1903. From the same period onwards, groups of Muslim Tatars and Oghuz Turks from Anatolia were settled into Dobruja at various intervals; in 1525, a sizable group of these, originating from the ports of Samsun and Sinop, moved to Babadag. Bayezid also asked Volga Tatars to resettle into northern Dobruja.

=== In late medieval Wallachia and Moldavia ===
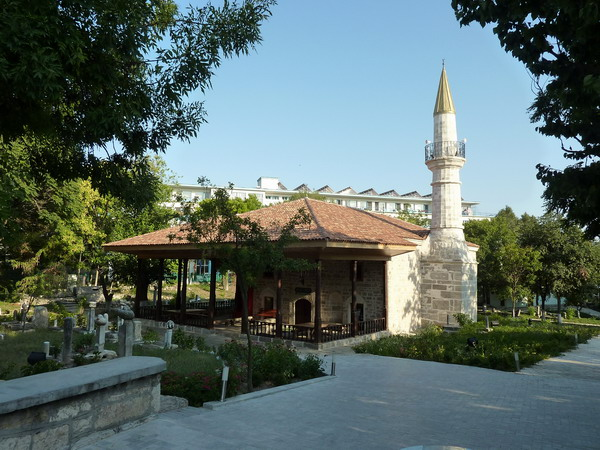
Esmahan Sultan Mosque in Mangalia, with Ottoman architecture.

In the two Danubian Principalities, Ottoman suzerainty had an overall reduced impact on the local population, and the impact of Islam was itself much reduced. Wallachia and Moldavia enjoyed a large degree of autonomy, and their history was punctuated by episodes of revolt and momentary independence. After 1417, when Ottoman domination over Wallachia first became effective, the towns of Turnu and Giurgiu were annexed as kazas, a rule enforced until the Treaty of Adrianople in 1829 (the status was briefly extended to Brăila in 1542).

For the following centuries, three conversions in the ranks of acting or former local hospodars are documented: Wallachian Princes Radu cel Frumos (1462–1475) and Mihnea Turcitul (1577–1591), and Moldavian Prince Ilie II Rareș (1546–1551). At the other end of the social spectrum, Moldavia held a sizable population of Tatar slaves, who shared this status with all local Roma people (see Slavery in Romania). While Roma slavery also existed in Wallachia, the presence of Tatar slaves there has not been documented, and is only theorized. The population may have foremost comprised Muslim Nogais from the Budjak who were captured in skirmishes, although, according to one theory, the first of them may have been Cumans captured long before the first Ottoman and Tatar incursions.

The issue of Muslim presence on the territory of the two countries is often viewed in relation to the relations between the Ottoman Sultans and local Princes. Romanian historiography has generally claimed that the latter two were bound by bilateral treaties with the Porte. One of the main issues was that of Capitulations (Ottoman Turkish: ahdnâme), which were supposedly agreed between the two states and the Ottoman Empire at some point in the Middle Ages. Such documents have not been preserved: modern Romanian historians have revealed that Capitulations, as invoked in the 18th and 19th centuries to invoke Romanian rights vis à vis the Ottomans, and as reclaimed by nationalist discourse in the 20th century, were forgeries. Traditionally, Ottoman documents referring to Wallachia and Moldavia were unilateral decrees issued by the Sultan. In one compromise version published in 1993, Romanian historian Mihai Maxim argues that, although these were unilateral acts, they were viewed as treaties by the Wallachian and Moldavian rulers.

Provisions toward Muslim-Christian relations have traditionally been assessed by taking in view later policies. According to one prominent interpretation, this would mean that the Principalities were regarded by the Ottomans as belonging to the Dâr al ahd' ("Abode of the Covenant"), a status granted to them in exchange for material gains. Therefore, the Ottoman Empire did not maintain troops or garrisons or build military facilities. Instead, as it happened in several instances, Ottoman Sultans allowed their Tatar subjects to raid Moldavia or Wallachia as a means to punish the dissent of local Princes. Literary historian Ioana Feodorov notes that the relations between the two smaller states and the Ottoman suzerain were based on a set of principles and rules to which the Ottoman Empire adhered, and indicates that, early in the 17th century, this system drew admiration from the Arabic-speaking Christian traveler Paul of Aleppo.

=== 17th–19th century ===
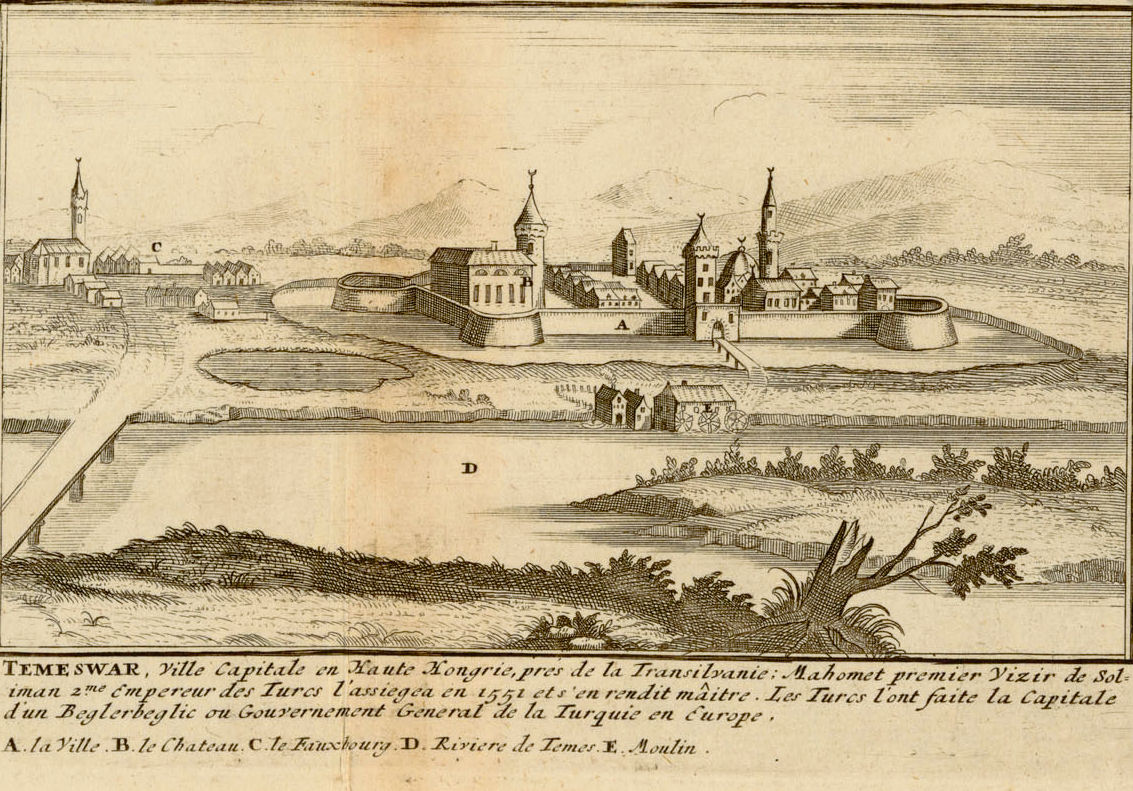
Mosques in Timișoara, 1656

By the 17th century, according to the notes of traveler Evliya Çelebi, Dobruja was also home to a distinct community of people of mixed Turkish and Wallachian heritage. Additionally, a part of the Dobrujan Roma community has traditionally adhered to Islam; it is believed that it originated with groups of Romani people serving in the Ottoman Army during the 16th century, and has probably incorporated various ethnic Turks who had not settled down in the cities or villages. Alongside Dobruja, a part of present-day Romania under direct Ottoman rule in 1551-1718 was the Temeşvar Eyalet (the Banat region of western Romania), which extended as far as Arad (1551–1699) and Oradea (1661–1699).

During this period, Muslim settlers, who included Bosniaks in Lipova, were a numerical minority, but exercised domination over the Christian majority by controlling the administration and the timar. Concentrated in cities, they included soldiers and their families, officials, merchants and craftsmen. Particularly in 17th-century Timișoara, the social and cultural life of the Muslim community flourished. The few thousand Muslims settled there were, however, driven out by Habsburg conquest and settled at Ada Kaleh. No mosques or other Ottoman-era buildings have survived in Timișoara.

The presence of Muslims in the two Danubian Principalities was also attested, centering on Turkish traders and small communities of Muslim Roma. It is also attested that, during later Phanariote rules and the frequent Russo-Turkish Wars, Ottoman troops were stationed on Wallachia's territory.

Following the Crimean Khanate's conquest by the Russian Empire (1783), many Tatars there took refuge in Dobruja, especially around Medgidia. At the time, Crimean Tatars had become the largest community in the region. Nogais in the Budjak began to arrive upon the close of the Russo-Turkish War of 1806–1812, when the Budjak and Bessarabia were ceded to Russia (they settled in northern Tulcea County - Isaccea and Babadag). Khotyn, once part of Moldavia, was the birthplace of Alemdar Mustafa Pasha, who was the Ottoman Grand Vizier until 1808. Two more Grand Viziers between 1821 and 1828 came from the once Moldavian city of Bender: Benderli Ali Pasha and Mehmed Selim Pasha (nicknamed Benderli, meaning "from Bender").

Over the same period, large groups of Circassians (as many as 200,000), refugees from the Caucasian War, were resettled in the Balkans, including Northern Dobruja, by the Ottomans (localities with large Circassian populace in Northern Dobruja included Isaccea, Slava Cercheză, Crucea, Horia, and Nicolae Bălcescu). During the 1860s, a significant number of Nogais, also fleeing Russian conquest, left their homes in the Caucasus and joined in the exodus to Dobruja. Members of other Muslim communities which joined in the colonization included Arabs (a group of 150 families of fellahin from Syria Province, brought over in 1831–1833), Kurds, and Persians—all of these three communities were quickly integrated into the Tatar–Turkish mainstream.

=== Kingdom of Romania ===
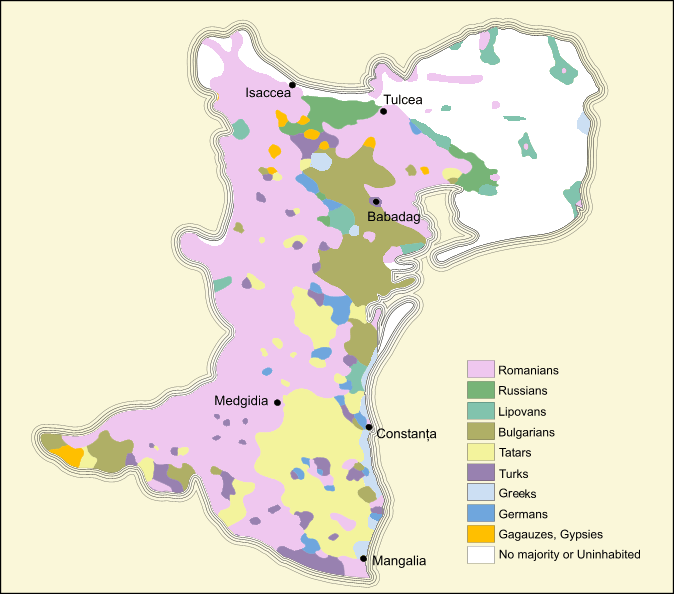
Tatars (yellow) and Turks (dark purple) in Northern Dobruja (1903)

Tatars in Tulcea County were driven out by Russian troops during the Russo-Turkish War of 1877–1878 (see Muhajir Balkan). Furthermore, after the signing of the Treaty of San Stefano, the Circassians of Dobruja and of other regions liberated from Ottoman rule were expelled, avoiding any contact between the Dobrujan Circassians and the Romanian authorities. Following the conflict and the Berlin Congress, the Romanian government of Ion Brătianu agreed to extend civil rights to non-Christians. In 1923 a monument in the shape of a small mosque was built in Bucharest's Carol Park, as sign of reconciliation after World War I. A small Turkish-speaking Muslim community resided on Ada Kaleh island in the Danube, south of the Banat, an Ottoman enclave and later part of Austria-Hungary, which was transferred to Romania in 1923.

At the end of the Second Balkan War in 1913, the Kingdom of Romania came to include Southern Dobruja, whose population was over 50% Turkish (the region was ceded to Bulgaria in 1940). As recorded after World War I, Romania had a population of 200,000 Muslims from a total of 7 million, the majority of which were Turks who lived in the two areas of Dobruja (as many as 178,000). Since 1877, the community was led by four separate muftiyats. Their number was reduced during the interwar period, when the cities of Constanța and Tulcea each housed a muftiyat. In 1943, the two institutions were again unified around the mufi in Constanța. Outside Dobruja, the relatively small presence of Albanian Muslims also left a cultural imprint: in 1921, the first translation of the Qur'an into Albanian was completed by Ilo Mitkë Qafzezi in the Wallachian city of Ploiești.

Until after World War II, the overall religiously conservative and apolitical Muslim population reportedly enjoyed a notable degree of religious tolerance. Nevertheless, after 1910, the community was subject to a steady decline, and many predominantly-Muslim villages were abandoned.

=== Communism and post-Revolution period ===
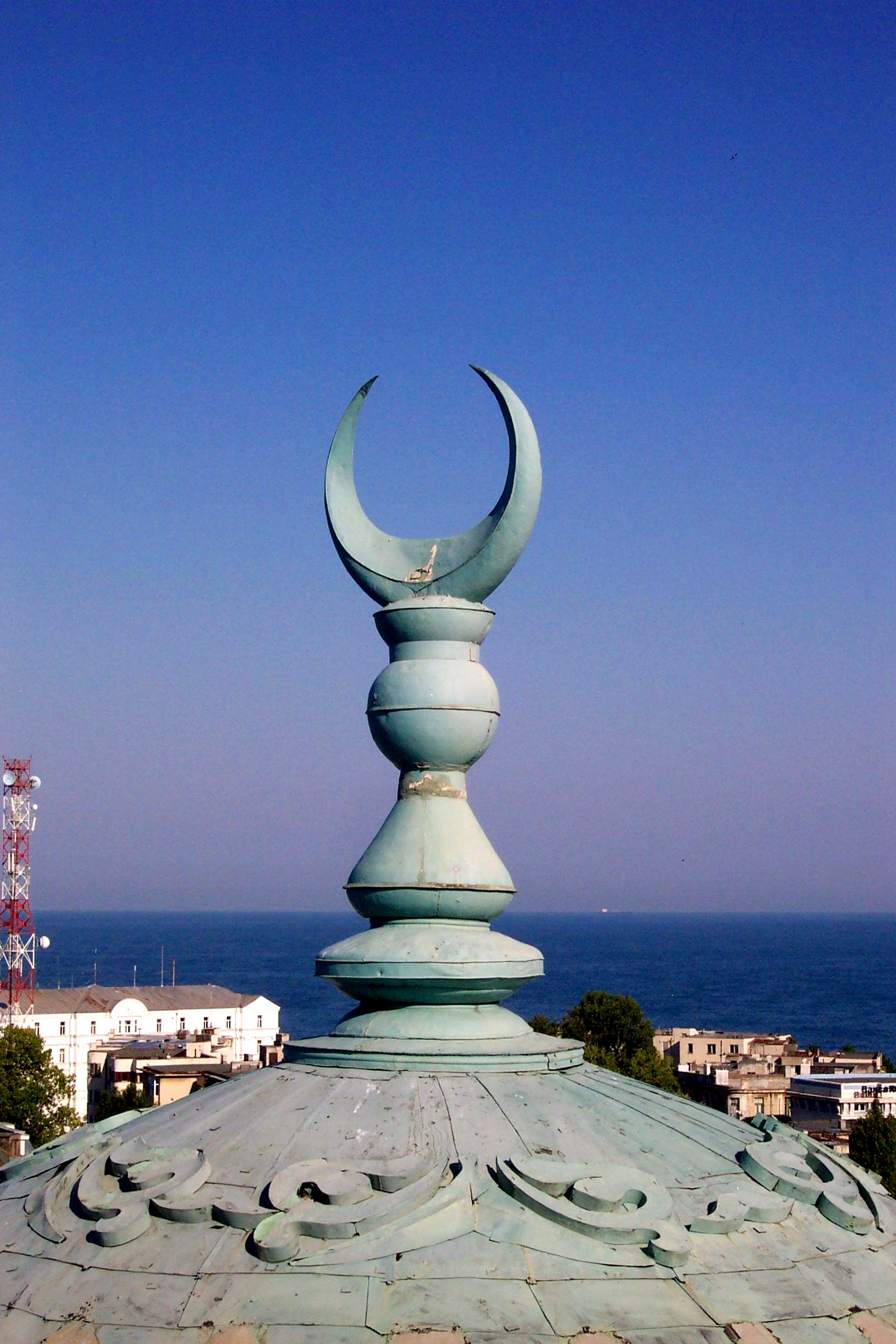
The dome of the Grand Mosque of Constanța, topped by the Islamic crescent

The Dobrujan Muslim community was exposed to cultural repression during Communist Romania. After 1948, all property of the Islamic institutions became state-owned. The following year, the state-run and secular compulsory education system set aside special classes for Tatar and Turkish children. According to Irwin, this was part of an attempt to create a separate Tatar literary language, intended as a means to assimilate the Tatar community. A reported decline in standards led to the separate education agenda being ceased in 1957. As a consequence, education in Tatar dialects and Turkish was eliminated in stages after 1959, becoming optional, while the madrasah in Medgidia was shut down in the 1960s. The population of Ada Kaleh relocated to Anatolia shortly before the 1968 construction of the Iron Gates dam by a joint Yugoslav-Romanian venture, which resulted in the island being flooded. At the same time, Sufi tradition was frowned upon by Communist officials—as a result of their policies, the Sufi groups became almost completely inactive.

However, according to historian Zachary T. Irwin, the degree to which the Muslim community was repressed and dispersed was lower in Romania than in other countries of Eastern Europe, and the measures were less severe than, for instance, those taken against Romanian Roman Catholics and Protestants. The state sponsored an edition of the Qur'an, and top clerics such as Mufti Iacub Mehmet and Bucharest Imam Regep Sali, represented the community in the Great National Assembly during Nicolae Ceaușescu's years in office. In the 1980s, a delegation of Romanian Muslims visited Iran after the Islamic Revolution succeeded in that country. They also adhered to international bodies sponsored by Libya and Saudi Arabia. These gestures, according to Irwin, brought only a few objections from the regime.

Following the Romanian Revolution of 1989, Tatar and Turkish were again added to the curriculum for members of the respective communities, and, in 1993, the Medgidia madrasah was reopened as a Theological and Pedagogic High School named after Turkish President Mustafa Kemal Atatürk. The school was later elevated to National College status, and is known in Romanian as Colegiul Național Kemal Atatürk. Since the 1990s, the official representatives of the Muslim community maintain close relations with international non-governmental organizations such as the Muslim World League. Also after the fall of communism, ethnic Romanians began converting to Islam. According to Murat Iusuf, they number in the thousands, and are frequently women who marry Muslim men. In 2014, a member of this community established the Maryam Mosque. Located in Rediu, in the region of Moldavia, its congregation is made up of converts. For some fourteen years, discussions went on regarding the building of a mosque in Bucharest. In 2015, Prime Minister Victor Ponta signed an agreement allowing the Turkish government to proceed. The latter was to provide €3 million for construction costs, while the Romanian state donated 11,000 m^{2} of land near Romexpo valued at €4 million. The mosque would have fit 2000 people, with a madrasah and a library on site. The project was controversial, with former President Traian Băsescu warning of "an accelerated Islamization process" and every major candidate for Mayor of Bucharest expressing opposition or calling for a referendum. The plan was canceled due to a lack of funds in 2018.

== Statistics ==
Year	Population	Note
1930	185,486	1.03%
1949	28,782	0.18%
1956	34,798	0.2%
1966	40,191	0.21%
1977	46,791	0.22%
1992	55,928	0.25%
2002	67,257	0.31%
2011	64,337	0.34%
2022	76,215	0.4%

== Gallery ==
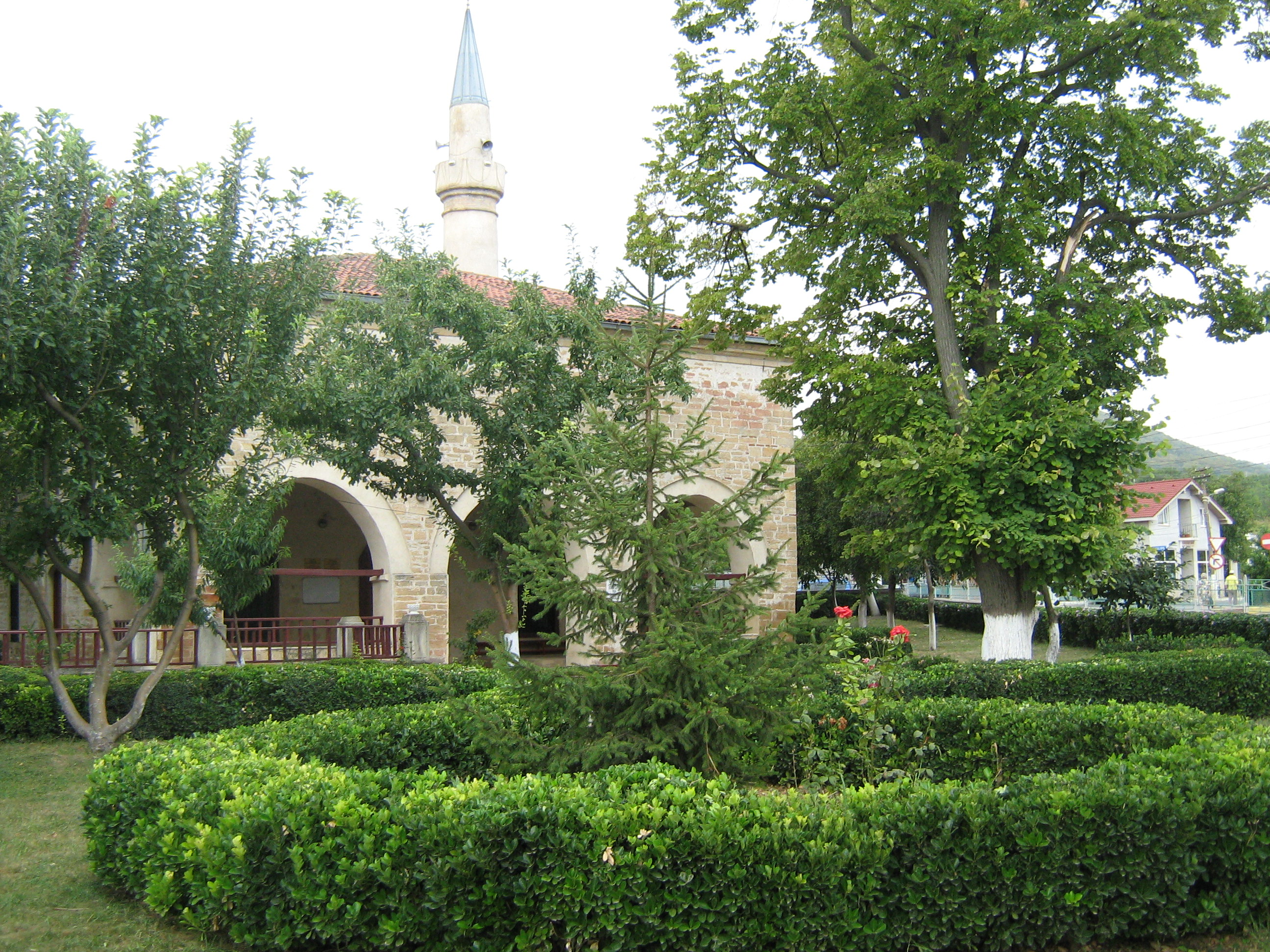
Gazi Ali Pasha Mosque, Babadag (1609-1610)

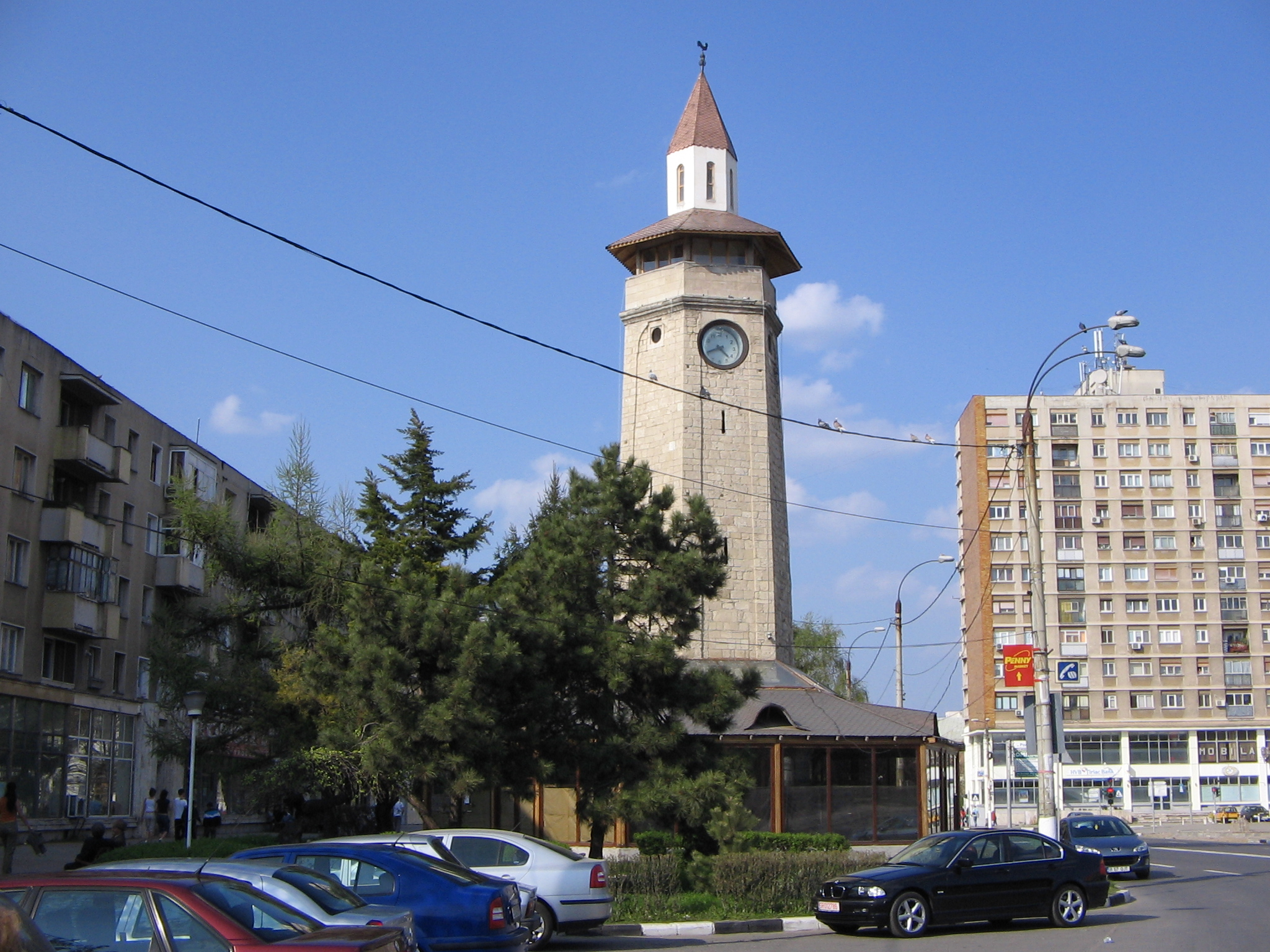
Ottoman clock tower, Giurgiu (1771)

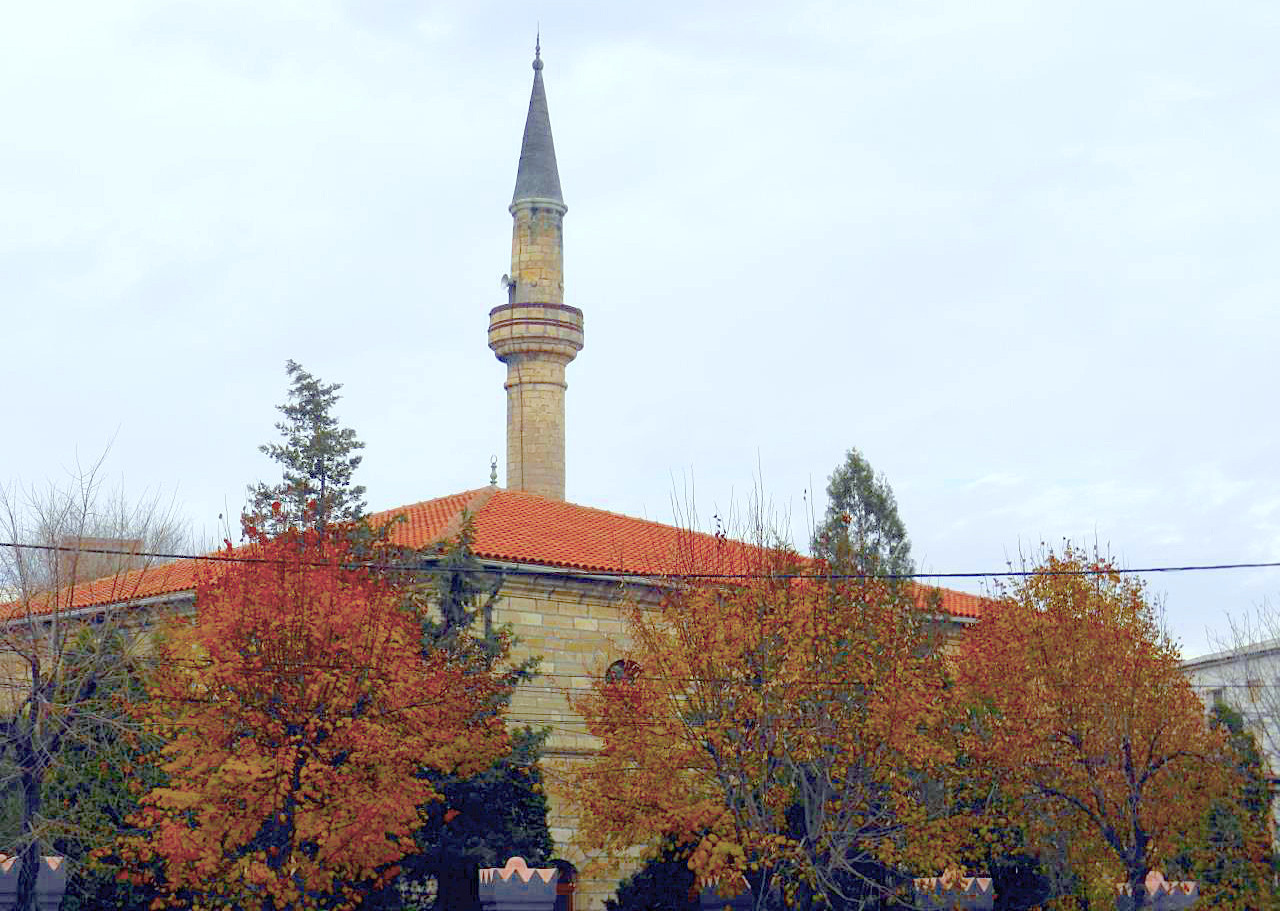
Abdul Medgid Mosque, Medgidia (1859-1865)

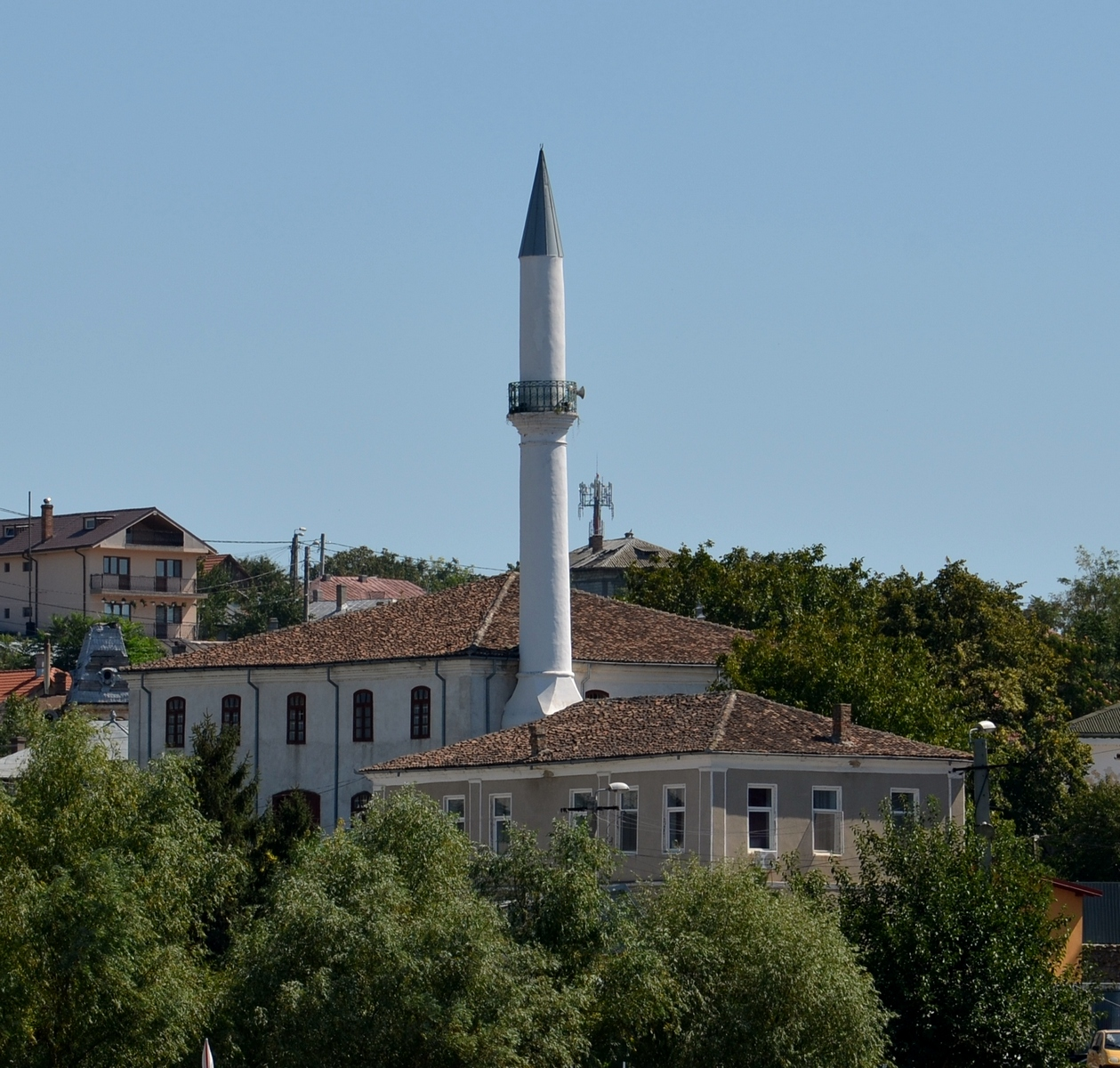
Azizyie Mosque, Tulcea (1863)

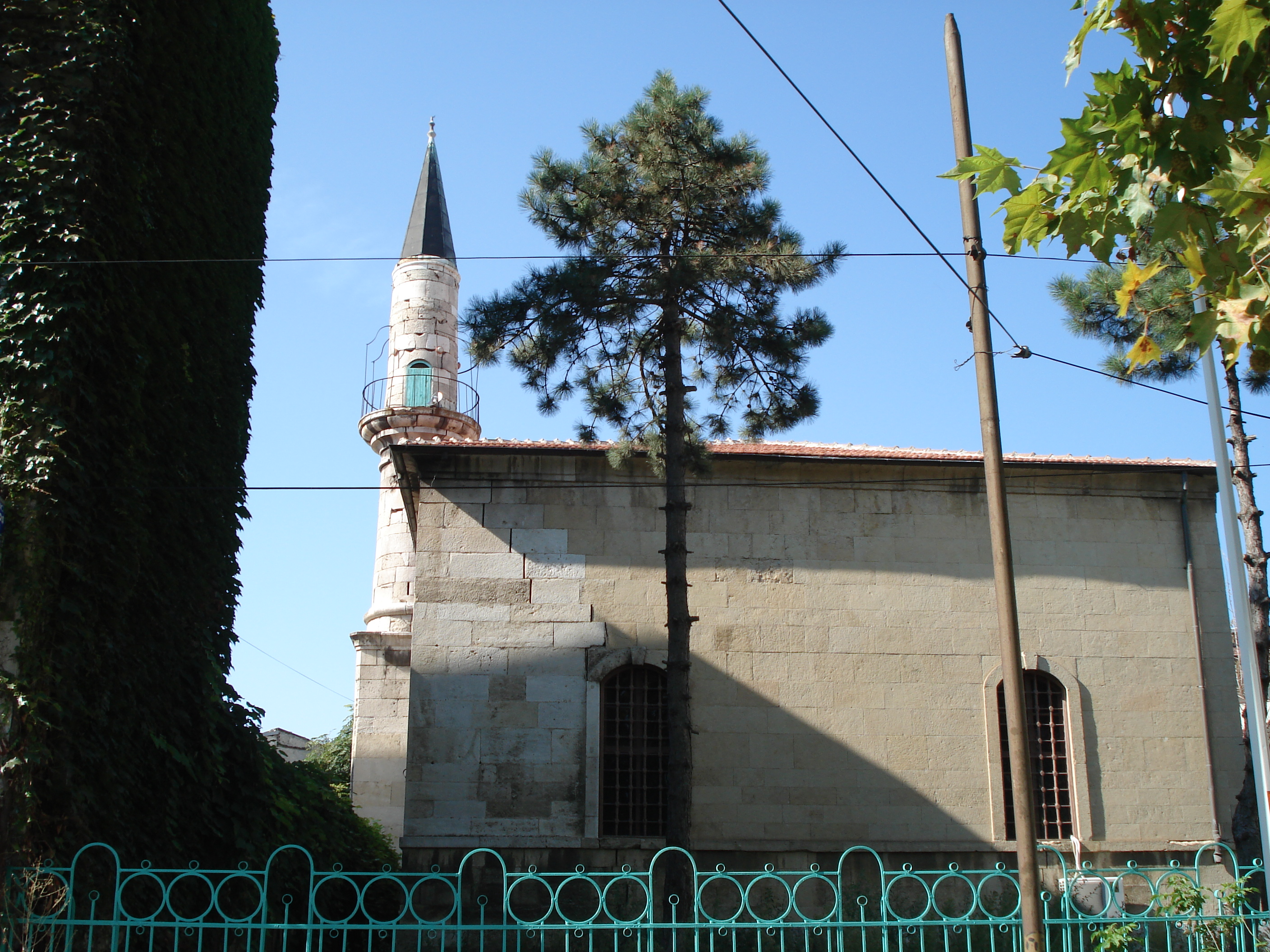
Hunchiar Mosque, Constanța (1869)

== See also ==
- Ottoman Romania
