= Esmahan Sultan Mosque =

Mosque in Constanța, Romania

Coordinates: 43°48′37″N 28°34′59″E

- Moscheea Esmahan Sultan
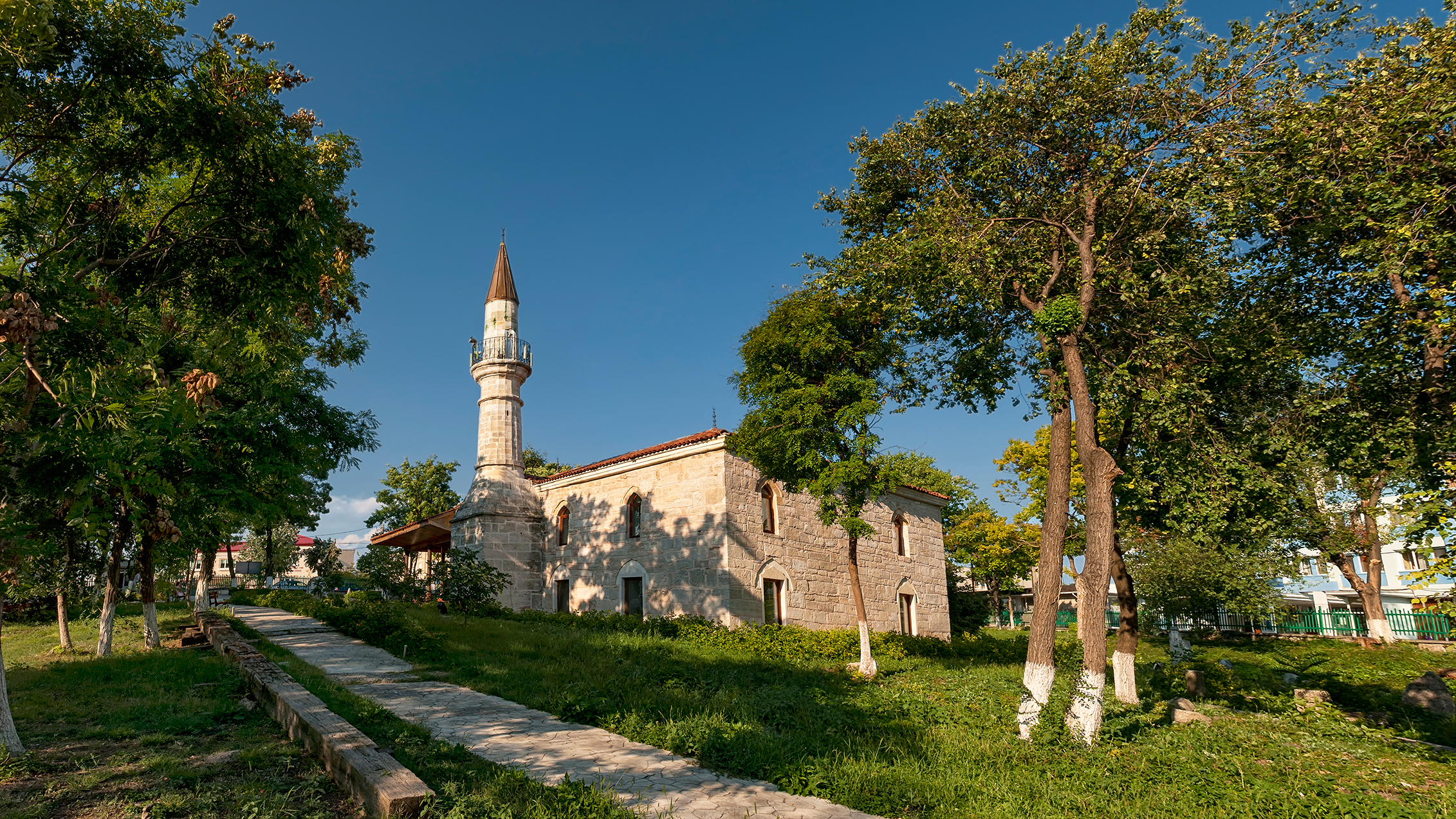
- Esmahan Sultan Mosque in 2014

Religion
- Affiliation: Sunni Islam

Location
- Location: Oituz Street 1, Mangalia, Constanța County, Romania
- Interactive map of Esmahan Sultan Mosque

Architecture
- Type: Mosque
- Completed: 1575

Specifications
- Minaret: 1
- Materials: Carved stone

Esmahan Sultan Mosque (Romanian: Moscheea Esmahan Sultan) is the oldest mosque in Romania.

Located in Mangalia, Constanța County, it serves a community of 800 Muslim families, most of them of Turkish and Tatar ethnicity.

== History ==
Esmehan Sultan Mosque was constructed in 1575 by its namesake, Ismihan, the daughter of Ottoman Sultan Selim II and Nurbanu Sultan, and wife of Ottoman Grand Vizier Sokollu Mehmed Pasha.

It was renovated in the 1990s and includes a graveyard with 300-year-old tombstones.

== Structure ==
The mosque was constructed with cut stone rescued from the Callatis ruins by a team of Turkish craftsmen. The stone blocks were glued together without the use of any binder, but merely with cast steel staples put in holes drilled in the stone. Oak props are installed at the Esmahan Sultan Mosque's entryway. The Minbar (pulpit), a place of prayer arranged as a balcony with stairs from where the imam, the Muslim priest speaks on and every feast day, may be situated on the wall opposite the mosque entrance (another term for places of Muslim worship). The mihrab, or blind window, and a Mecca-oriented niche are positioned on the left side of the Minbar. It is a type of shrine where the Imam performs religious services every day. The inside is devoid of cult paintings and other ornamental elements. The ceiling is adorned with beautiful woodwork and exquisite craftsmanship that grabs the attention of all visitors. It should be noticed that the women's prayer areas are divided from the rest of the room by a modest wooden barrier. The terrace at the summit of the minaret (from where the Imam used to issue the call to prayer) may be reached by spiral staircases. The porch pillars and wooden railings give the building a distinctive appearance on the outside. A fountain built of stone from an old tomb may be found inside the worship space. In addition, the mosque is flanked by a cemetery as precious as the monument itself, which contains Muslim tombs dating back more than 300 years. Both the mosque and the cemetery are listed as Historical Monuments in Romania.

== See also ==
- Category:Ottoman architecture in Romania
- Giurgiu Clocktower
- Tulcea Art Museum
- Azizyie Mosque
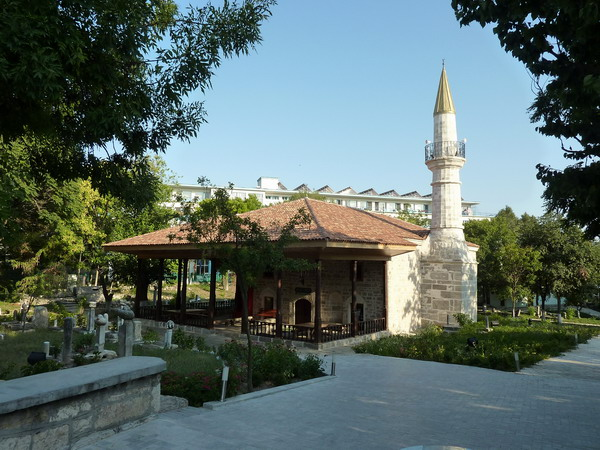
Different angle

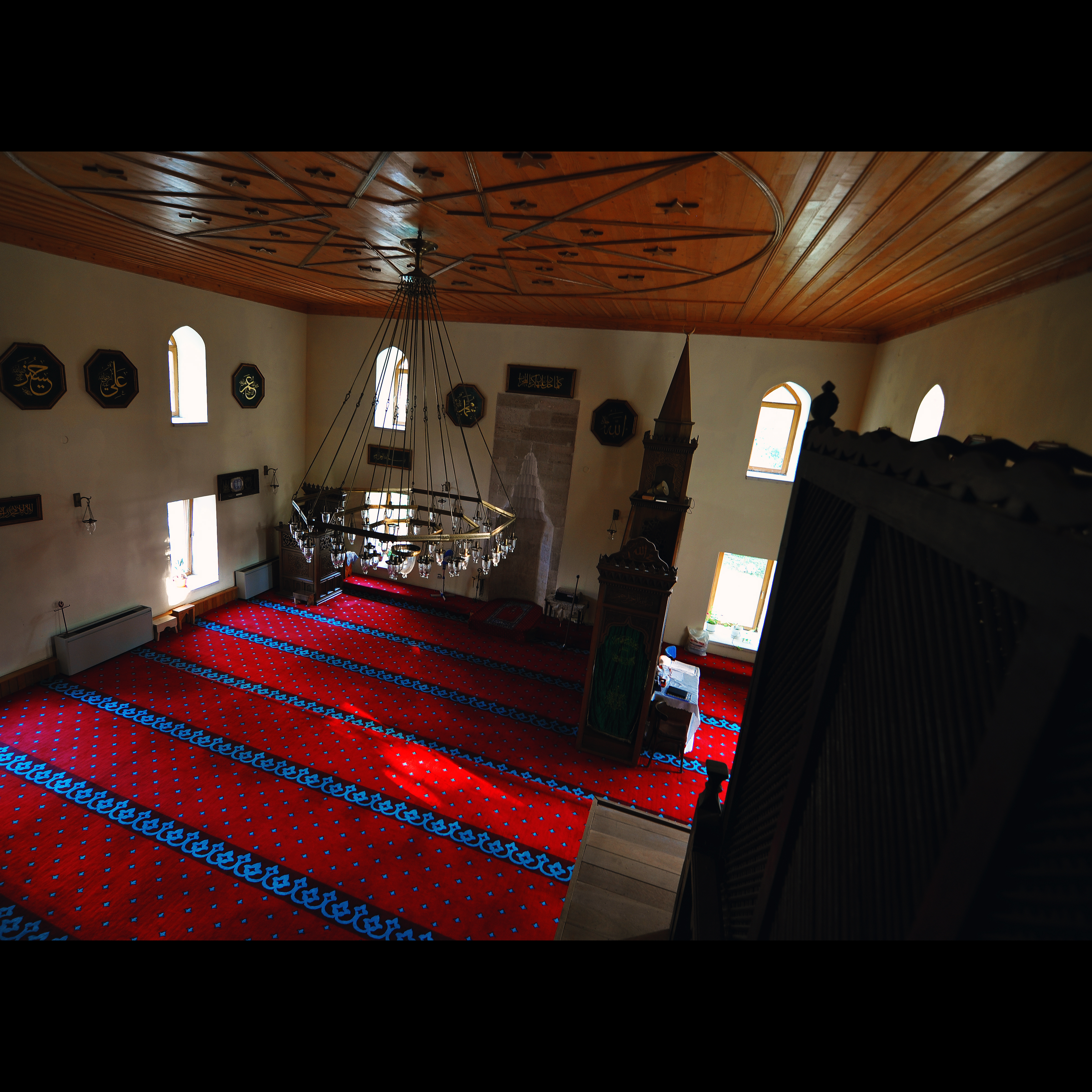
Inside the mosque
