= Diocese of Tulcea =

The Diocese of Tulcea (Romanian: Episcopia Tulcii) is a diocese of the Romanian Orthodox Church. Its see is Saint Nicholas Cathedral in Tulcea and its ecclesiastical territory covers Tulcea County. Divided into three archpriests' districts, it has around 150 churches and priests, fourteen monasteries and a theological seminary in Tulcea. The diocese forms part of the Metropolis of Muntenia and Dobrudja. It was established in 2004, and in 2008, Visarion Bălțat became the diocese's first bishop.
