= Platonia (disambiguation) =

Platonia may refer to:

- Platonia, a plant genus in the family Clusiaceae
- Platonia (philosophy), a hypothetic timeless realm by Julian Barbour containing every possible momentary configuration of the universe
- Platonia (place), a place under the St. Sebastian basilica on the Via Appia in Rome
- Platonia dilemma, a game theory introduced in Douglas Hofstadter's book Metamagical Themas
- a 1998 novel by Romanian writer Mirela Roznoveanu
- a synonym for Neurolepis, a bamboo genus in the family Poaceae
- a fictional planet in the 1962 science fiction-themed children's television show Fireball XL5
