= Romanian river ports =

List of river ports in Romania

The most important Romanian river ports are:

== Orșova ==
- performing capacity: 1.200.000 to/year
- Quay length – 500 linear meters – 5 anchording place

== Calafat ==
- performing capacity: 350.000 to/year
- Quay length – 100 linear meters –1 anchoring place

== Cetate ==
- performing capacity: 70.000 to/year
- Quay length – 100 linear meters - 1anchording place

== Gruia ==
- performing capacity: 70.000 to/year
- Quay length – 100 linear meters – 1 anchoring place

== Hârșova ==
- performing capacity: 70.000 to/year
- Quay length - 100 linear meters - 1 anchoring place

== Drencova ==
- performing capacity: 100.000 to/year
- Quay length - 100 linear meters - 1 anchoring place

== Moldova Veche ==
- performing capacity: 350.000 to/year
- Quay length - 300 linear meters - 3 anchoring place

== Brăila ==
- performing capacity: 4.500.000 to/year
- Quay length - between 100–400 linear meters - 10 anchoring place
- Quay length - between 400–700 linear meters - 9 anchoring place

== Galați ==
- performing capacity: 17.075.000 to/year
- Quay length - 200 linear meters - 8 anchoring place
- Quay length - 800 linear meters - 8 anchoring place

== Tulcea ==
- performing capacity: 800.000 to/year
- Quay length - between 100–300 linear meters - 4 anchoring place
- Quay length - 400 linear meters - 4 anchoring place

== See also ==
- Galați
- Brăila
- Tulcea
