= Cerchez =

Cerchez, Cherchez and Cerkez are Romanian words meaning "Circassian". The Circassians were a prominent minority in Northern Dobruja during the 19th century. This region now belongs to Romania.

Cerchez, and its variations, may refer to:

- Cerchez (surname), a Romanian surname
- Cerchez (river), a Romanian river
- Cerchezu (formerly known as Cerchezchioi), a commune in Constanța County named after the Circassians
- Slava Cercheză, a commune in Tulcea County named after the Circassians
- Cerchez, the Romanian name of Cherkesy, a Ukrainian village in the Odesa Oblast
- Cerchez & Co., the first Romanian aircraft company, aerodrome and flight school, named after its founder Mihail Cerchez

== See also ==
- Circassian (disambiguation)
- Circassians in Romania
