= Port of Tulcea =

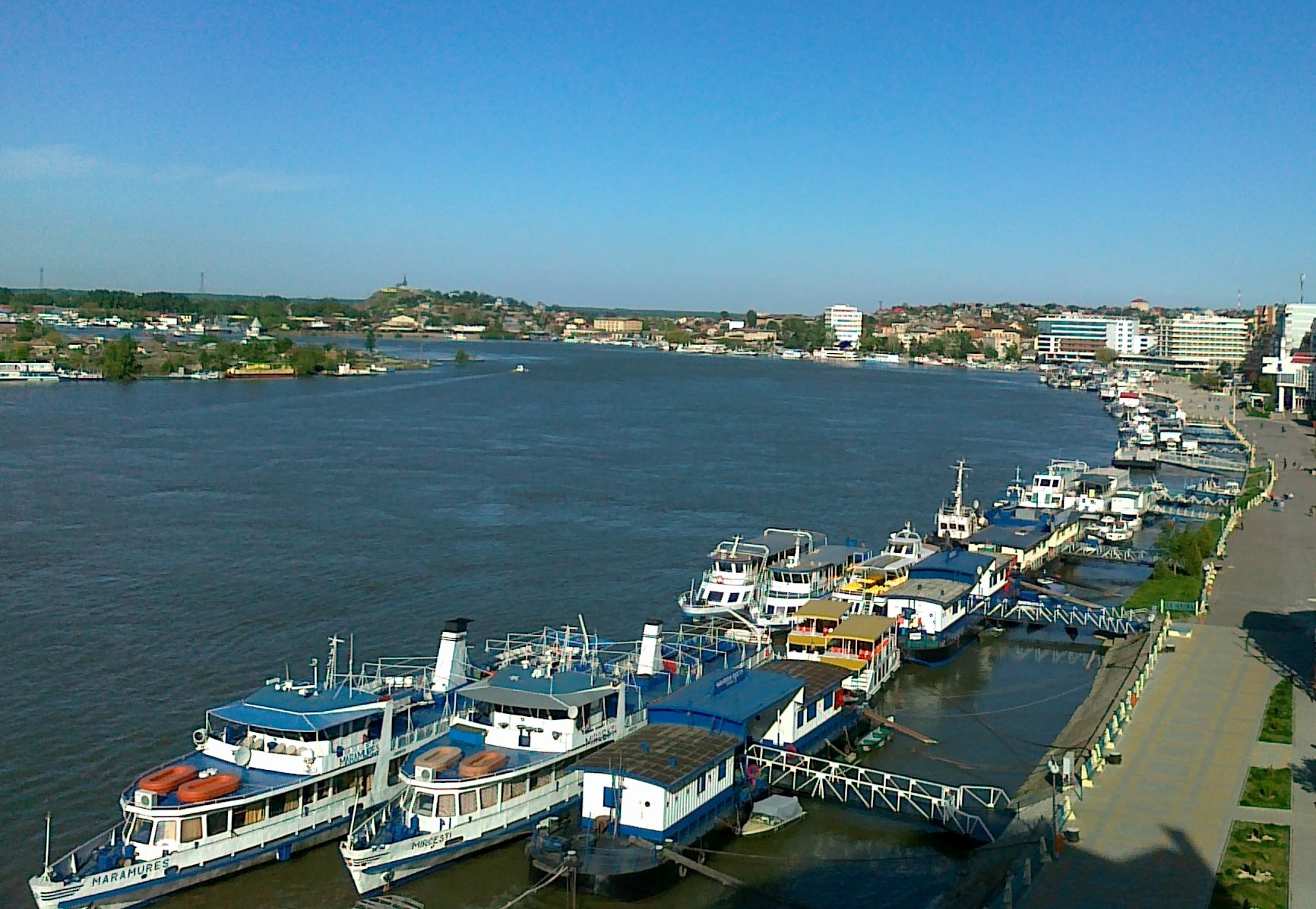
- Click on the map for a fullscreen view

Location
- Country: Romania
- Location: Tulcea County
- Coordinates: 45°10′N 28°49′E
- UN/LOCODE: ROTCE

Details
- Owned by: Compania Națională Administrația Porturilor Dunării Maritime
- Type of harbour: Natural/Artificial
- Size: 83 acres (0.083 square kilometres)
- No. of berths: 41
- General manager: Nicu Popoaca

Statistics
- Vessel arrivals: 914 (2008)
- Annual cargo tonnage: 1,248,000 tonnes (2008)
- Website; Official site

The Port of Tulcea is one of the largest Romanian river ports. Located in the city of Tulcea on the Danube river, the port is an important source of revenue for the city because many large international companies have established there.

The shipbuilding industry is a key activity of the port and Norwegian company STX Europe (formerly Aker Yards) is the most important enterprise established there.
