= Circassian =

Circassian may refer to:

- Circassia, a former geographical region located in present-day European Russia, Northern Caucasus
  - Circassian coast, on the Black Sea
- Circassians, also known as Adyghe people
  - Circassian diaspora
- Circassian language, a Northwest Caucasian language or subgroup of languages
- Circassians (historical ethnonym), a term used to denominate different peoples of the Black Sea shore and the Northern Caucasus
- Circassian beauty, a type of sideshow performer associated with Circassian people

== Other uses ==
- USS Circassian (1862), a Union Navy steamship in the American Civil War

== See also ==
- Cerchez (disambiguation)
