= Valentin Serbu =

Romanian writer

Valentin Serbu (July 20, 1934 – January 29, 1994) was a contemporary Romanian writer, best known for his novels and satirical short stories. His most popular writings include Figurantii – Baltazar ("Figurants – Balthazar") Satirica ("Satire"), Tărâm necunoscut ("Unknown land"), his science fiction novel Fantastice ("Fantastics"), Tentative ("Tentatives"), Fantastica Delta ("The Fantastic Delta"), Provinciale ("Provincials"), Expediţia ("The Expedition").

He was born in Tulcea. He has a dedicated memorial room within the Panait Cerna Library in Tulcea.
