= St. Nicholas Cathedral, Tulcea =

Romanian Orthodox cathedral

Coordinates: 45.1769°N 28.8020°E

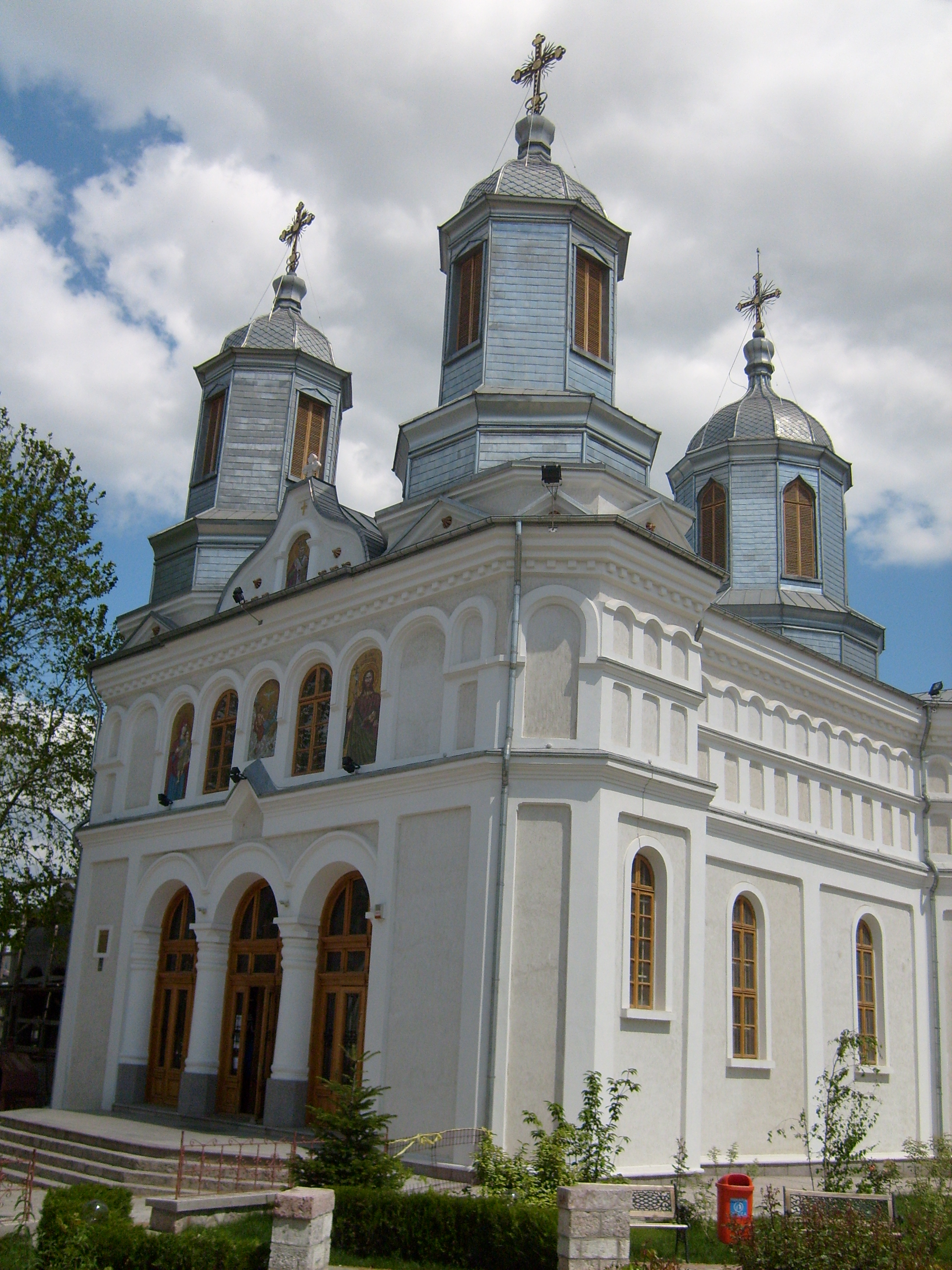
St. Nicholas Cathedral

St. Nicholas Cathedral (Romanian: Catedrala Sf. Nicolae) is a Romanian Orthodox cathedral located at 37 Progresului Street in Tulcea, Romania. It is dedicated to Saint Nicholas, and is the see of the Diocese of Tulcea.

The original church on the site, a small wooden structure, was built in the 18th century by Romanian refugees from nearby Beștepe, who fled depredation by bashi-bazouk soldiers, preferring the security of Tulcea. Regular services were conducted in Romanian by a priest from Transylvania. Later, the community received special approval to raise a larger church, complete with domes, becoming the town's first such building.

The present cathedral was begun in 1862, with the benediction of Metropolitan Dionisie of Durostor. In 1867, while traveling to Constantinople for his investiture, Prince Carol I of Romania stopped at the nearly finished church, donating a metal chalice and a hundred gold coins. The Ottoman authorities closed the church in 1872. In November 1877, during the Romanian War of Independence, Metropolitan Nichifor of Dobruja, a Greek, forcibly reopened the church, in agreement with the leading local Romanians. The local Russian military governor rushed to the spot, threatening to send the metropolitan to Siberia; the latter held firm, and the governor accepted the fait accompli, with the Romanian community taking possession. Subsequently, the church hosted clandestine preparations for the welcoming of the new Romanian administration.

The cross-shaped cathedral is large, in Byzantine Revival style. The bells, cast at Memmingen in 1882, can be heard from afar; each is engraved with the provincial symbol: two dolphins. The walls are of stone and brick, coated with galvanized tin. The interior is painted in oil. The ceiling has fifteen arches resting on eight stone and brick columns. Initially, the interior was unpainted and quite bare, with stone blocks serving as an altar. In 1878, when Dobruja was incorporated into the Romanian Old Kingdom and ministers visited, the church received 10,000 lei for immediate improvements, including a new iconostasis to replace the one improvised out of planks. An 1897 government grant of 63,000 lei permitted the interior to be painted, along with other repairs, as well as a new oak iconostasis.

Ștefan Luchian participated in the painting, which however remained unfinished when the church reopened and with a dedication ceremony presided by Metropolitan Partenie Clinceni in May 1900. The floor was laid in mosaic, and the iconostasis icons date to 1905–1906. Claiming it was of poor quality, the new painter covered everything Luchian had done. A stone fence was added in 1923, with the mosaic replaced by wooden flooring in 1934.

The cathedral is listed as a historic monument by Romania's Ministry of Culture and Religious Affairs.
