= Cerchez (surname) =

Cerchez, Cherchez or, rarely, Cerkez, is a Romanian surname that means "Circassian". A community of Circassians existed in Northern Dobruja during the 19th century. Notable people with the surname include:

- Cristian Cherchez (born 1991), Romanian professional footballer
- Cristofi Cerchez (1872–1955), Romanian architect and engineer
- Ecaterina Cercheza (1620–1666), Circassian noble and second spouse of the Moldavian voivode Vasile Lupu
- Grigore Cerchez (1850–1927), Romanian architect, engineer and professor
- Hamdi Cerchez (1941–1994), Romanian comedian of Tatar or Turkish descent
- Mihail Cerchez (1839–1885), Romanian general

== See also ==
- Cerchez (disambiguation)
- Circassians in Romania
