= Azizyie Mosque =

Mosque in Tulcea, Romania

- Moscheea Azizyie
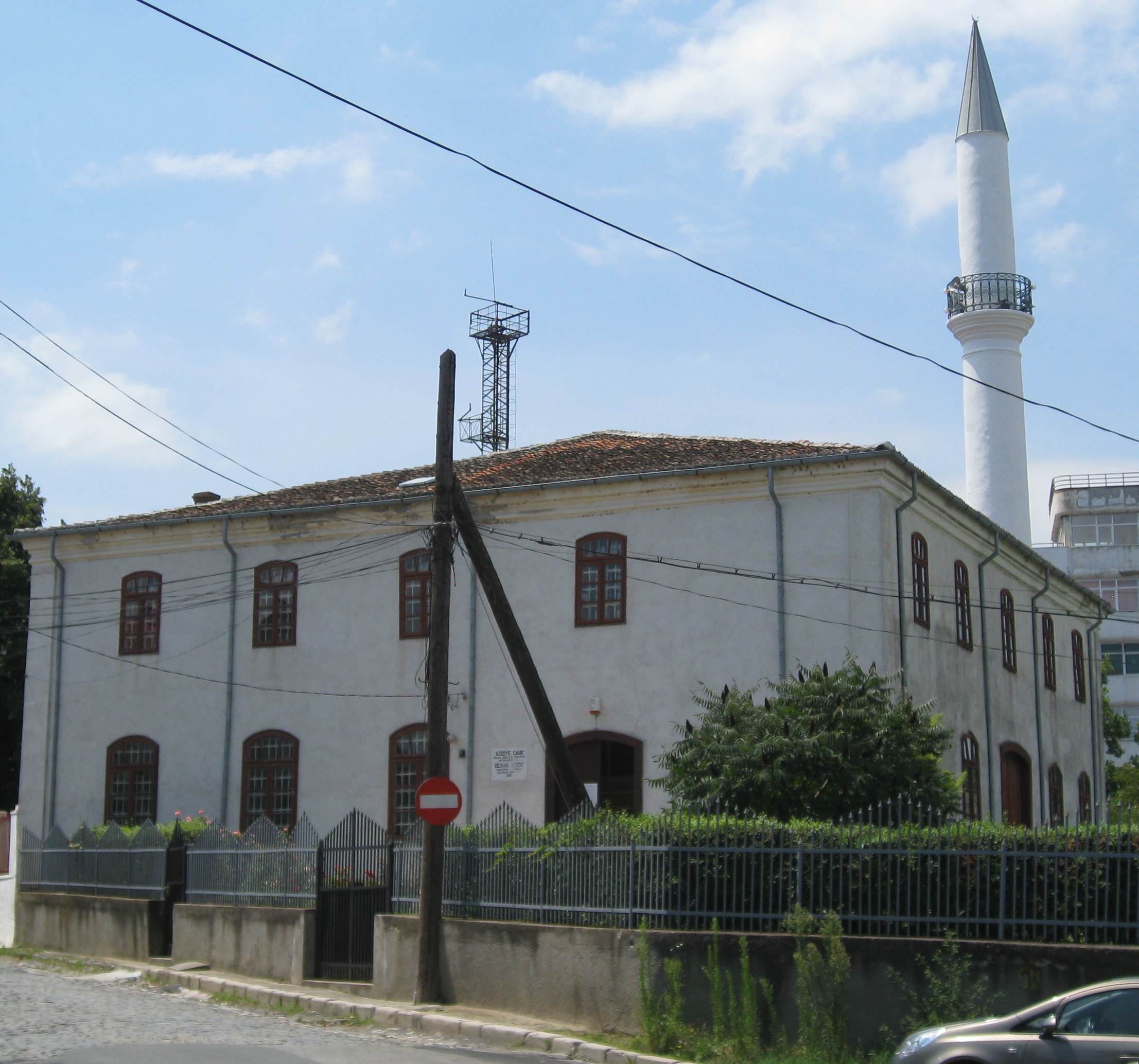

- Location within Romania

Religion
- Affiliation: Sunni Islam

Location
- Location: Tulcea, Dobruja, Romania
- Interactive map of Azizyie Mosque
- Coordinates: 45.1815°N 28.8066°E

Architecture
- Type: Mosque
- Established: 1863

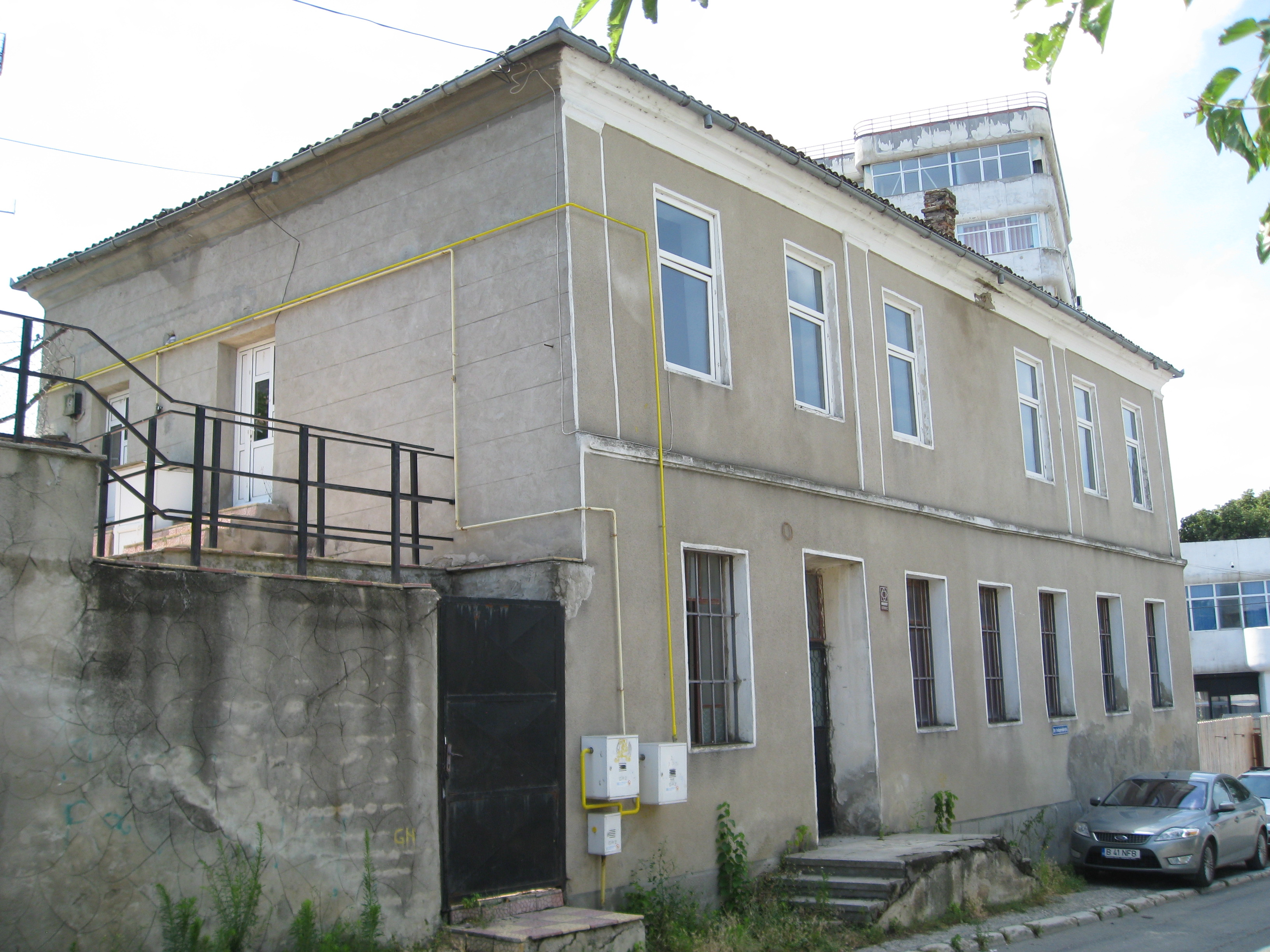
Former Turkish school

The Azizyie Mosque (Romanian: Moscheea Azizyie) is a mosque located at 2 Independenței Street in Tulcea, Romania, in the Dobruja region.

It was built in 1863, during the reign of Sultan Abdülaziz, to whom it is dedicated and after whom it is named. Among the largest mosques built by the Ottoman Empire in Dobruja, it is made of cut stone 85 cm thick. It has 32 windows, of which 18 are on the upper part, ensuring natural lighting for the interior terrace that surrounds the building on three sides. From the period when the mosque was founded, a Turkish school functioned adjacent to the mosque; dating to 1865, it is now closed. The current minaret dates to 1897. By that time, Dobruja was part of the Romanian Old Kingdom, and the minaret was rebuilt using funds supplied by the Religious Affairs and Public Instruction Ministry.

The mosque was indirectly benefited by the raids of the Circassians of Dobruja. Having been settled in the region in 1864 following the Circassian genocide, they would come into conflict with several of the native peoples and carry out raids against them. They would later give part of the profits they made through these raids to the Ottoman authorities, which would spend some of them on the Azizyie Mosque and the modern Tulcea Art Museum. The Dobrujan Circassians were expelled after the signing of the Treaty of San Stefano.

The mosque and the former school are listed as historic monuments by Romania's Ministry of Culture and Religious Affairs.

== See also ==
- Islam in Romania
