= Tulcea Art Museum =

Coordinates: 45.1802°N 28.8050°E

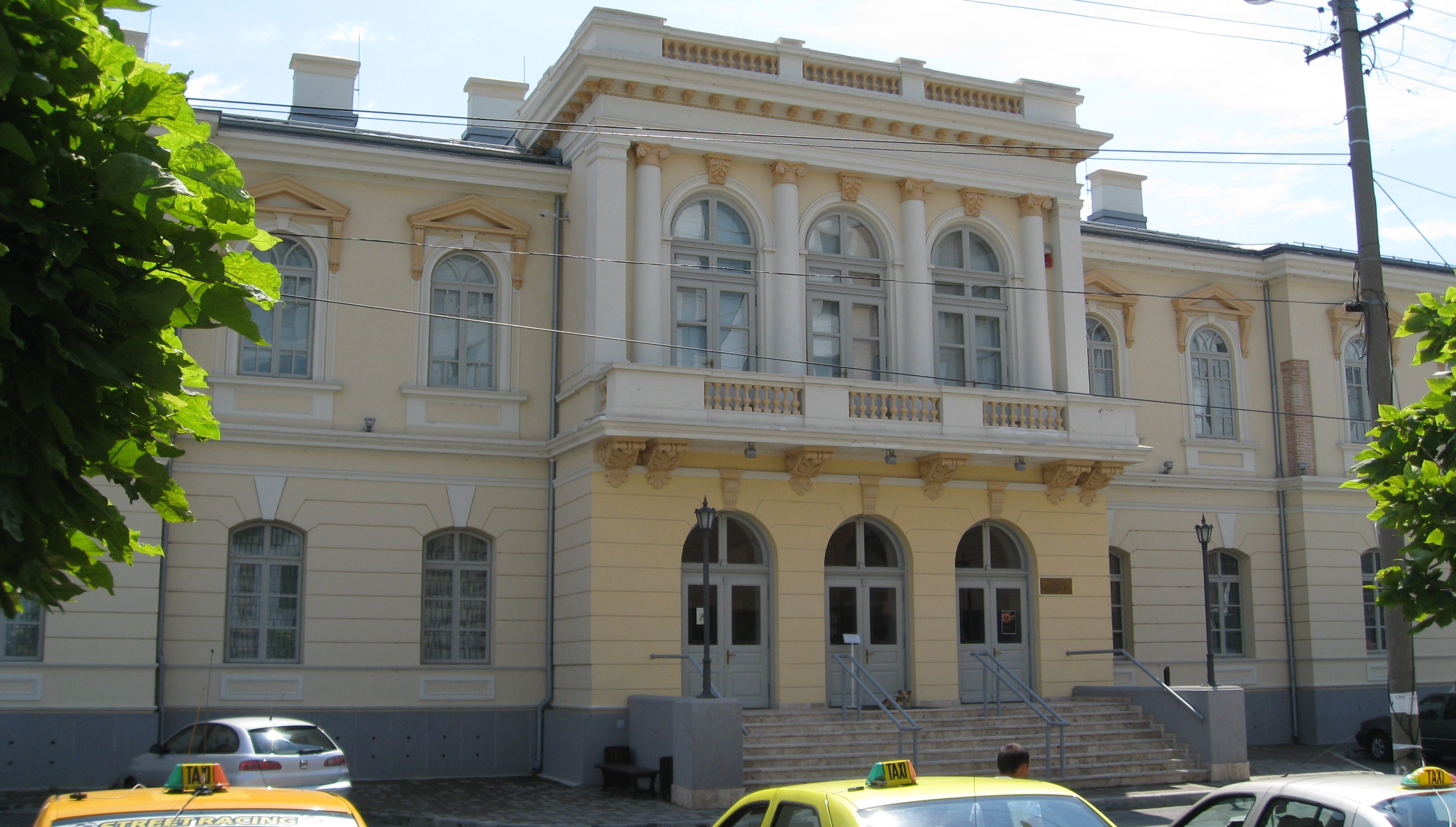
Tulcea Art Museum

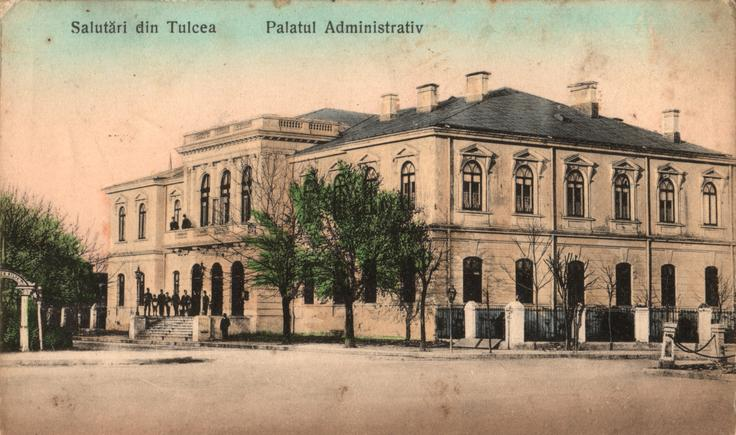
Early 20th-century postcard

The Tulcea Art Museum (Romanian: Muzeul de Artă din Tulcea) is an art museum located at 2 Grigore Antipa Street, Tulcea, Romania.

The building that houses the museum was erected between 1863 and 1865, under the Ottoman Empire, and was originally an administrative center, the palace of the Tulcea sanjak's pasha, headquarters of the mutasarrıfate and its nine kaza administrators. In 1860, Tulcea had become the capital of a sanjak including Northern Dobruja (minus the Danube Delta) and part of Southern Dobruja; the previous capital was at Babadag. It was during this period that the European Commission of the Danube was established and foreign consulates began to appear in Tulcea. The palace was partially built, together with the Azizyie Mosque, with funds given by Dobrujan Circassian raiders to the Ottoman authorities. This group had settled in Northern Dobruja in 1864 following the Circassian genocide and was expelled after the Ottoman defeat in the Russo-Turkish War of 1877–1878.

Following this war and Romania's absorption of Northern Dobruja, the building retained its administrative function until 1970, hosting the prefecture, courthouse, prosecutor's office and, between 1950 and 1970 under the Communist regime, the raion and later county councils. It underwent a full restoration in 1893-1895, a partial one in 1941 following the 1940 Vrancea earthquake, and yet another one from 2009 to 2012.

The art museum opened in 1982. Its seven collections include: modern and contemporary painting; modern and contemporary sculpture; 18th-, 19th- and 20th-century icons; modern and contemporary sketches; engraving plates; 18th- and 19th-century oriental art; and 18th-, 19th- and 20th-century decorative art. The building is listed as a historic monument by Romania's Ministry of Culture and Religious Affairs.
