= Mirela Roznoveanu =

Mirela Roznoveanu (born 10 April 1947) is a literary critic, writer, and journalist who has published novels, literary criticism, essays, and poetry. She was a noted dissident journalist during the turbulent period of communist Romania's late eighties. Currently she signs literary criticism columns in the monthly literary journals Contemporanul. Ideea Europeana and Convorbiri literare.

Roznoveanu was born in Tulcea. She holds an MA in Romance Languages from the University of Bucharest (1970), a master's degree in Library and Information Sciences from the Pratt Institute (1996), and a Certificate in Internet Technologies from New York University (1997).

She was fired in 1974 from the literary and cultural magazine "Tomis" in Constanța where she had been a senior columnist because she refused to enroll in the Romanian Communist Academy Stefan Gheorghiu. In 1975 she moved to Bucharest. Between 1978 and 1989 she worked as a senior columnist for the cultural magazine "Magazin" published by the "România liberă" newspaper; in April 1989, during the process of the journalists from the "Bacanu Group", she had been investigated by the Securitate, banned to enter the premises of her workplace, her name forbidden in the media, and sent to work to the newsletter of the Health Ministry; her books and writing were banned (5. Grupul "România liberă" bulverseaza Securitatea si Sectia de presa a CC al PCR). She had been part of the dissident group of journalists who took over the "România liberă" newspaper from the hands of the Communist government on 23 December 1989, making it the first independent and anti-communist newspaper in Romania. She became a senior columnist, member in the board of directors, and a founder member of the "R" Company SRL. She had been also a founder member of Alianta Civica, the most important post-revolution pro-democracy group.

In 1991, she moved to the United States, where she has continued her writing career. She was a tenured foreign, comparative and international law librarian at the NYU School of Law (Associate Curator: International and Foreign Law Librarian, 1996–2013). From 2005-2015 she was the Founder and the Editor of Globalex as Adjunct Associate Curator with the NYU Hauser Global Law School Program and the Honorary Editor of Globalex (2015-). Globalex was awarded the American Society of International Law Jus Gentium Research Award on 13 May 2020.

In December 2000, Mirela Roznoveanu was honored by outgoing President of Romania Emil Constantinescu, for exceptional contributions from abroad in the service of Romanian culture and democracy. Mirela has been named an Officer of the National Order of Faithful Service.

Her book The Civilization of the Novel: A History of Fiction Writing from Ramayana to Don Quixote received the 2008 Award of the Romanian Society of Comparative Literature and the 2008 Award of the Romanian Academy.

Interview: Mirela Roznoveanu's Four Decades of Professional Writing: A Dialog with Vladimir Wertsman for Multicultural Review

- She was awarded in 2013 the AALL-FCIL SIS award.
- She was awarded in 2015 the Reynolds & Flores Publication Award.
- On 14 December 2000 she has been awarded the Officer of the National Order of Faithful Service.
- The 2006 Award for literary criticism of Convorbiri literare cultural publication.
- The 2008 Award of the Romanian Society of Comparative Literature
- The 2008 Award of the Romanian Academy for The Civilization of the Novel: A History of Fiction Writing from Ramayana to Don Quixote.

== Publications ==
- Modern Readings, essays, Bucharest, Cartea Românească Publishing House, 1978
- D.R.Popescu. Critical monograph, Bucharest, Albatros Publishing House, 1983
- Civilizatia Romanului (The Civilization of the Novel: A History of Fiction Writing from Ramayana to Don Quixote). An essay on comparative literature, Albatros Publishing House, vol.I −1983, Bucharest; Cartea Românească Publishing House vol. II – 1991, Bucharest
- Totdeauna Toamna (Always in the Autumn), novel, Bucharest, Cartea Românească Publishing House, 1988
- Viata pe Fuga (Life on the Run), novel, Bucharest, Sirius Publishing House, 1997;
- Invatarea Lumii (Apprehending the World), poetry, Bucharest, Luceafărul Foundation Publishing House, 1998
- Platonia, novel, Bucharest, Cartea Românească Publishing House, 1999
- Timpul celor Alesi (The Time of the Chosen), novel, Bucharest, Univers Publishing House, 1999
- Toward a Cyberlegal Culture, essays, New York, Transnational Publishers 2001, 2002 second ed.
- Born again—in Exile, poetry, New York, iUniverse, 2004
- The Life Manager and Other Stories, novellas, New York, iUniverse, 2004
- The Poems and the Poet. A multimedia companion to Born Again – in Exile. Eastern Shore Productions, 2007;
- Elegies from New York City, New York, Koja Press, 2008
- Civilizatia Romanului (The Civilization of the Novel: A History of Fiction Writing from Ramayana to Don Quixote.) An essay on comparative literature, Cartex Publishing House, Bucharest 2008 (2nd edition)
- Old Romanian Fairy Tales. Xlibris 2012; 2nd revised edition 2013.
- Life on the Run. A novel. Xlibris, 2018. Translation from the Romanian of Viata pe Fuga.
- A Magic Journey to Things Past. Memoir. Xlibris, 2019.
- Epic Stories. Xlibris, 2020.
- Vlachica: Mountaintops above a Stormy Sea of Contending Empires. Xlibris, 2021.

== References in Books ==
- Titu Popescu, (Germany), Mirela – un Paradox (Mirela Roznoveanu – monograph essay), Pop Verlag-Marineasa, 2005
- Mircea Zaciu, Marian Papahagi, Aurel Sasu, Dicționarul Scriitorilor Români, volumul 4: R – Z, Editura Albatros, București, 2002
- Aurel Sasu, Dicționarul Scriitorilor Români din Statele Unite și Canada, Editura Albatros, București, 2001
- Marian Popa (Germany), Istoria literaturii române de azi pe mâine, 2 vols, București, Fundația Luceafărul, 2001
- "Dicționarul General al Literaturii Române", Academia Română, 2004–2008.
- Gabriel Pleșea (US), Scriitori români la New York, Interviuri, București, Editura Vestala, 1998
- Who's Who in America
- Who's Who in American Law
- Who's Who of American Women
- Who's Who in the World
- Gale Encyclopedia of Multicultural America, 2014. 3rd edition, vol. 4, p. 25.
