= Tulcea =

- Municipality
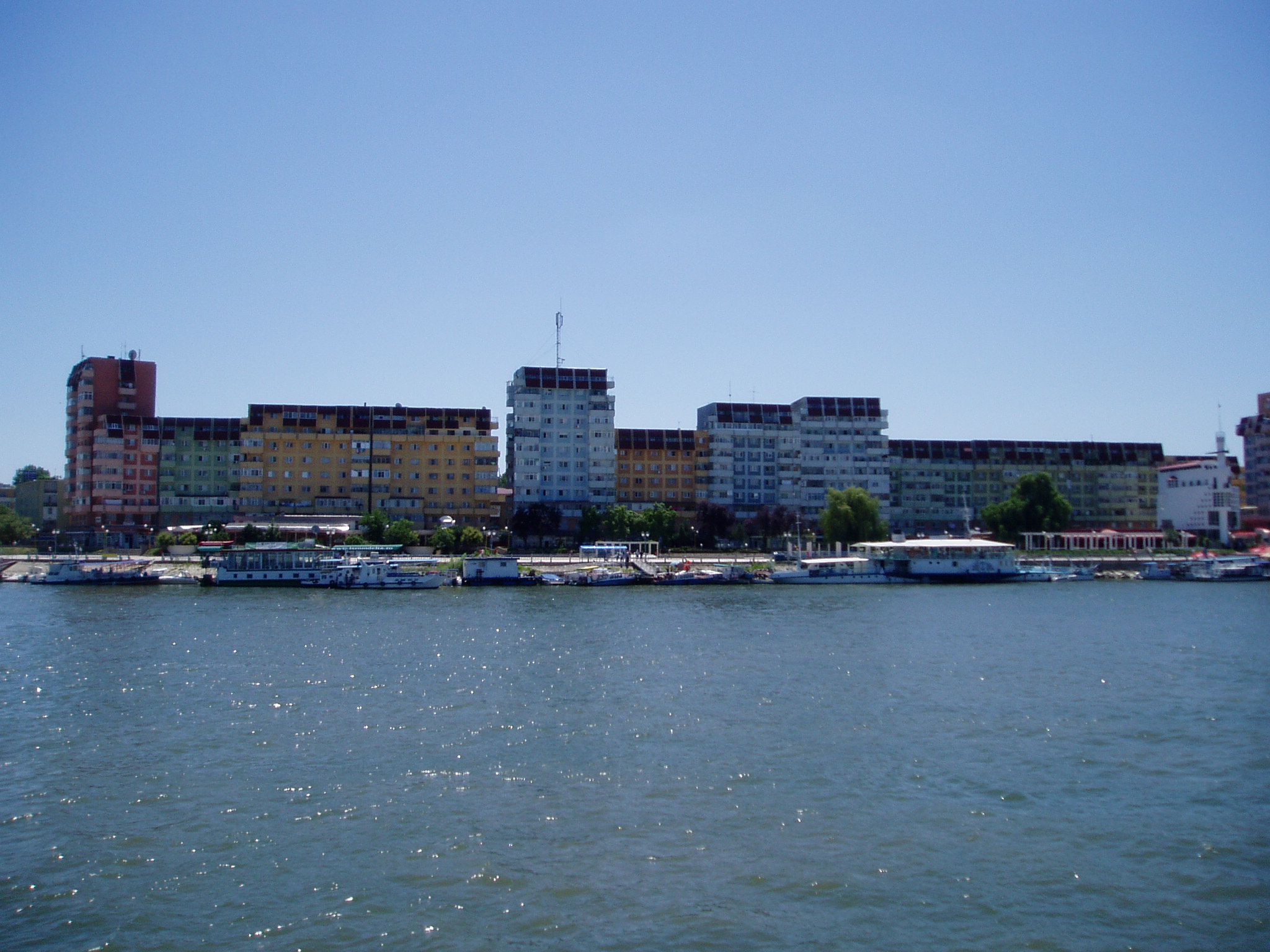
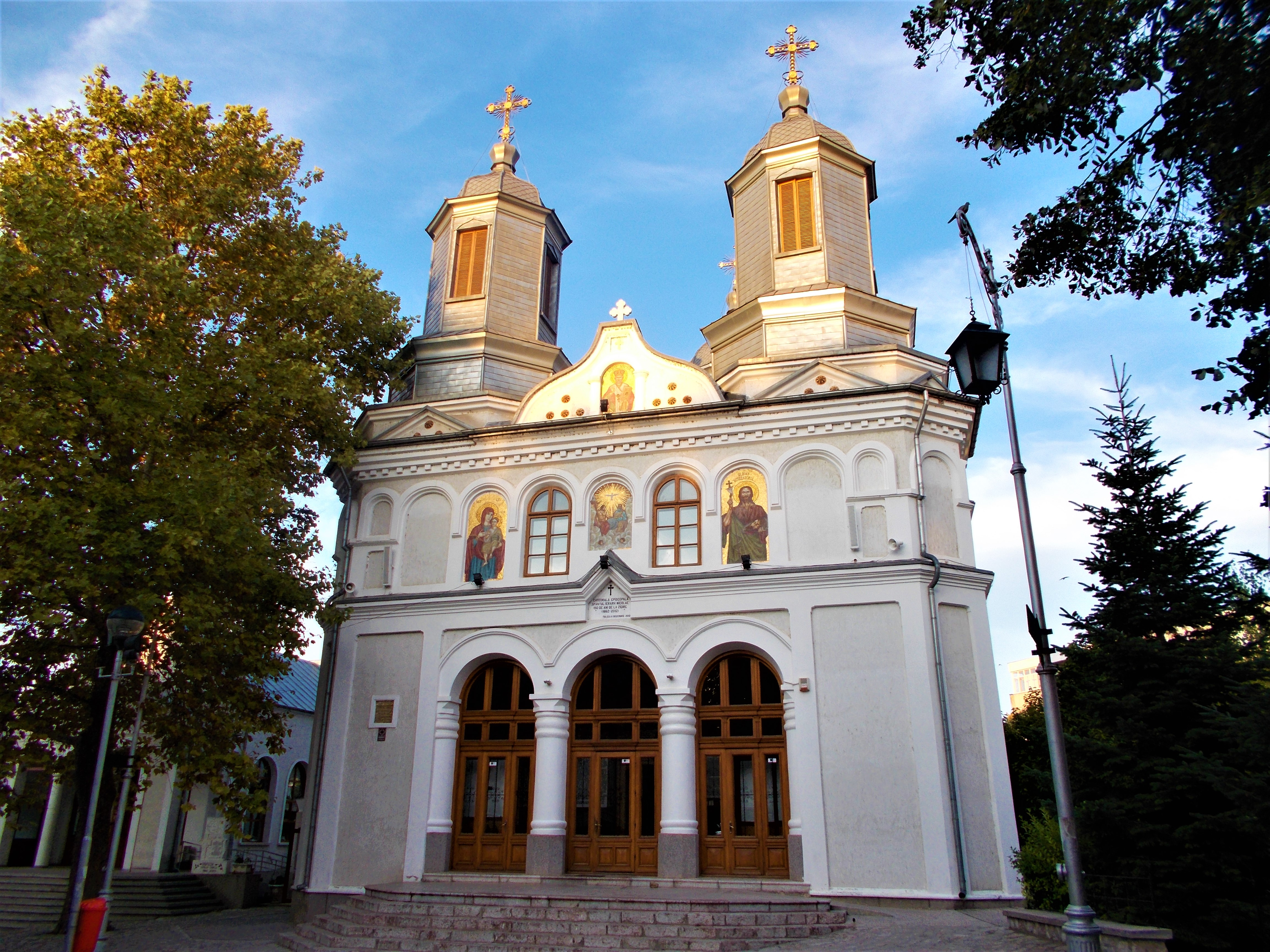
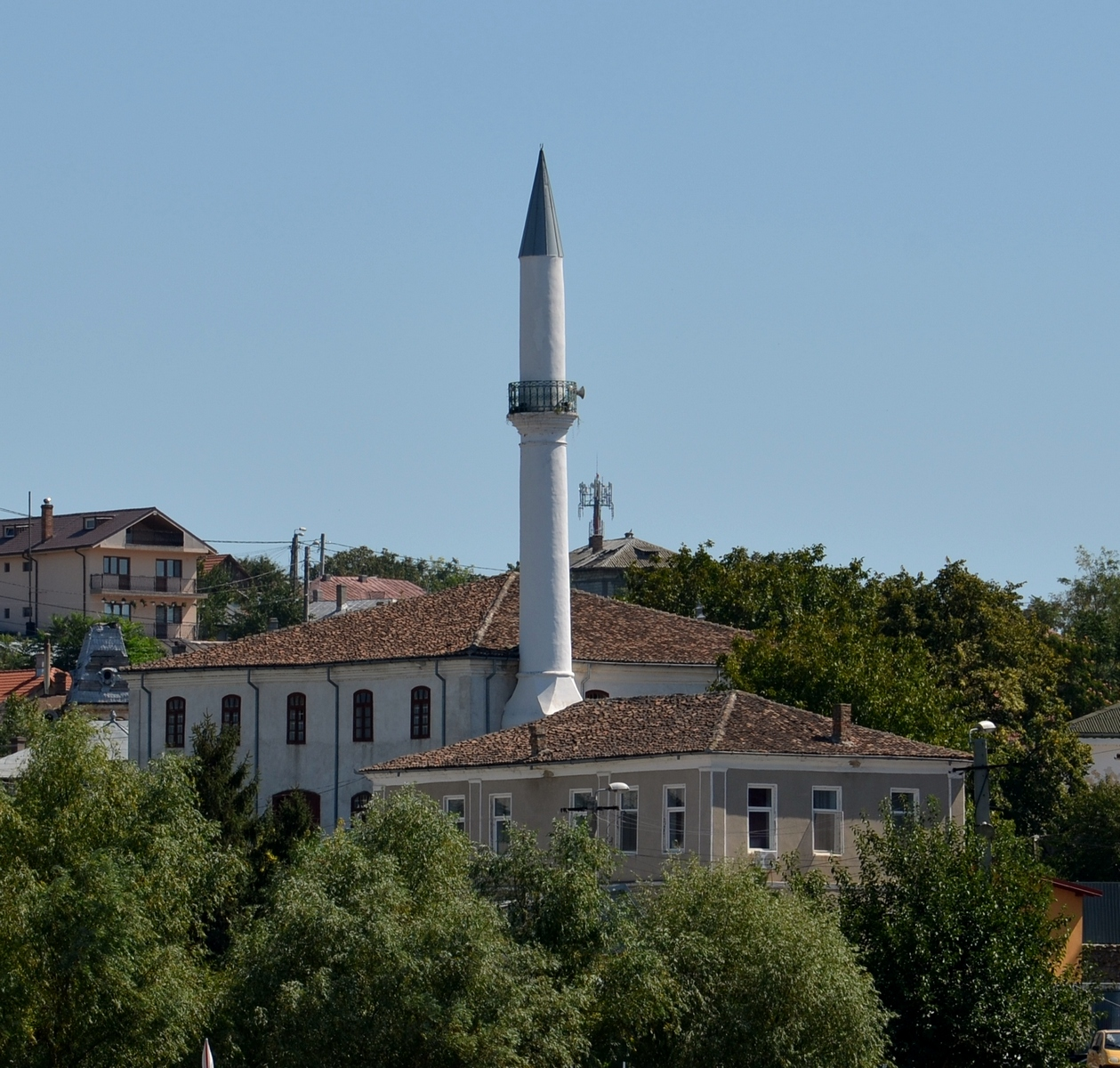
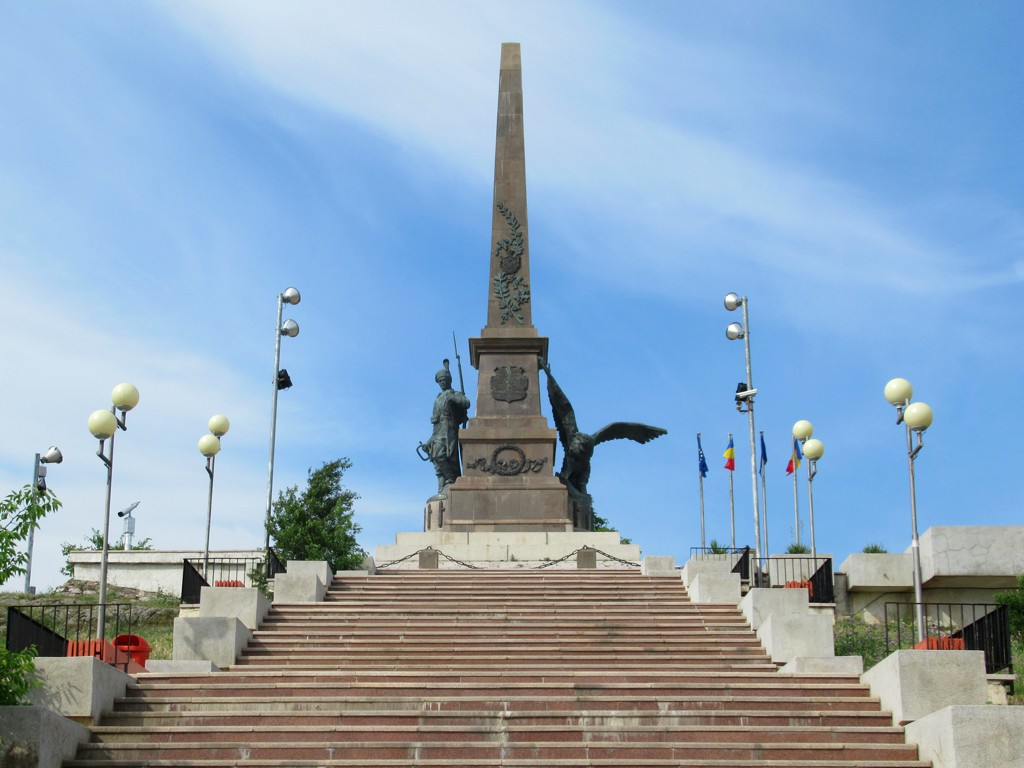
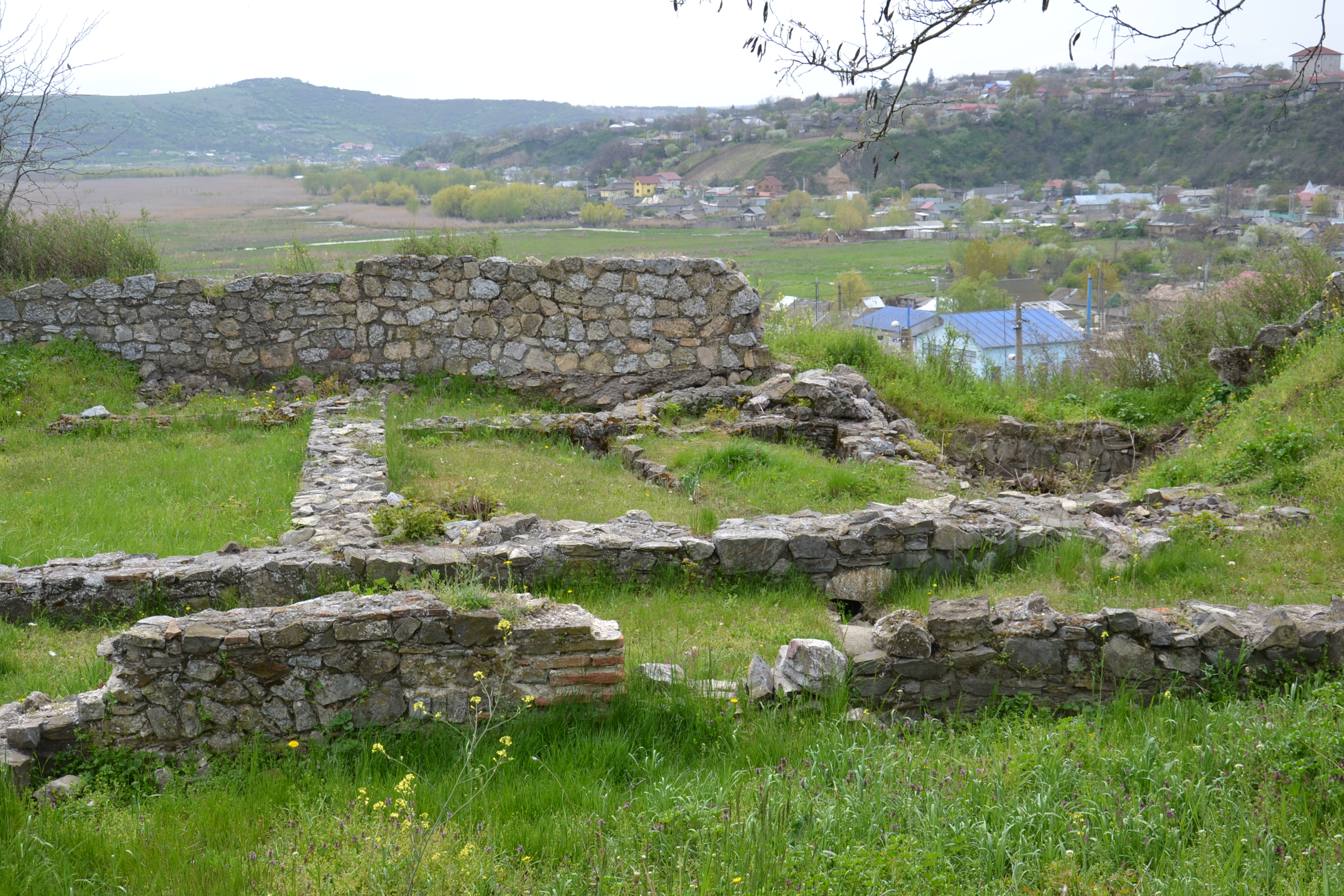
- Port of Tulcea St. Nicholas Cathedral Azizyie Mosque Monument of Independence Ruins of Aegyssus

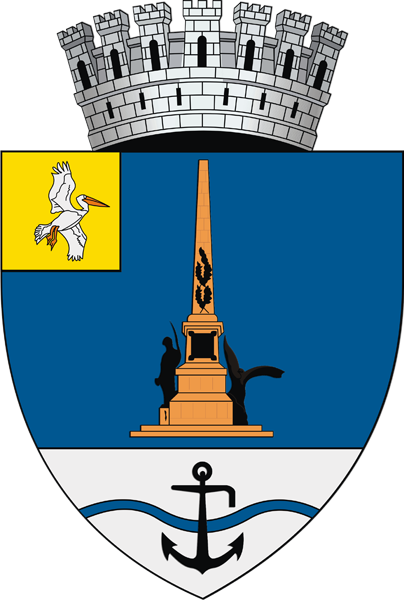
- Coat of arms

- Location in Romania
- Coordinates: 45°10′39″N 28°48′13″E
- Country: Romania
- County: Tulcea

Government
  - Mayor (2024–2028): Ștefan Ilie (PNL)
- Area: 177.24 km^{2} (68.43 sq mi)
- Elevation: 30 m (98 ft)
- Population (2021-12-01): 65,624
  - Density: 370.26/km^{2} (958.96/sq mi)
- Time zone: UTC+02:00 (EET)
  - Summer (DST): UTC+03:00 (EEST)
- Postal code: 820002–820249
- Area code: (+40) 02 40
- Vehicle reg.: TL
- Website: www.primaria-tulcea.ro

Tulcea (Romanian pronunciation: [ˈtult͡ʃe̯a]; also known by alternative names) is a city in Northern Dobruja, Romania. It is the administrative center of Tulcea County, and had a population of 65,624 as of 2021. One village, Tudor Vladimirescu, is administered by the city. It is one of six Romanian county seats lying on the river Danube.

== Names ==
The city is known in Bulgarian, Russian and Ukrainian as Тулча, romanized: Tulcha; in Greek as Αιγισσός, romanized: Aigissós; in Hungarian as Tulcsa; and in Turkish as Tulça.

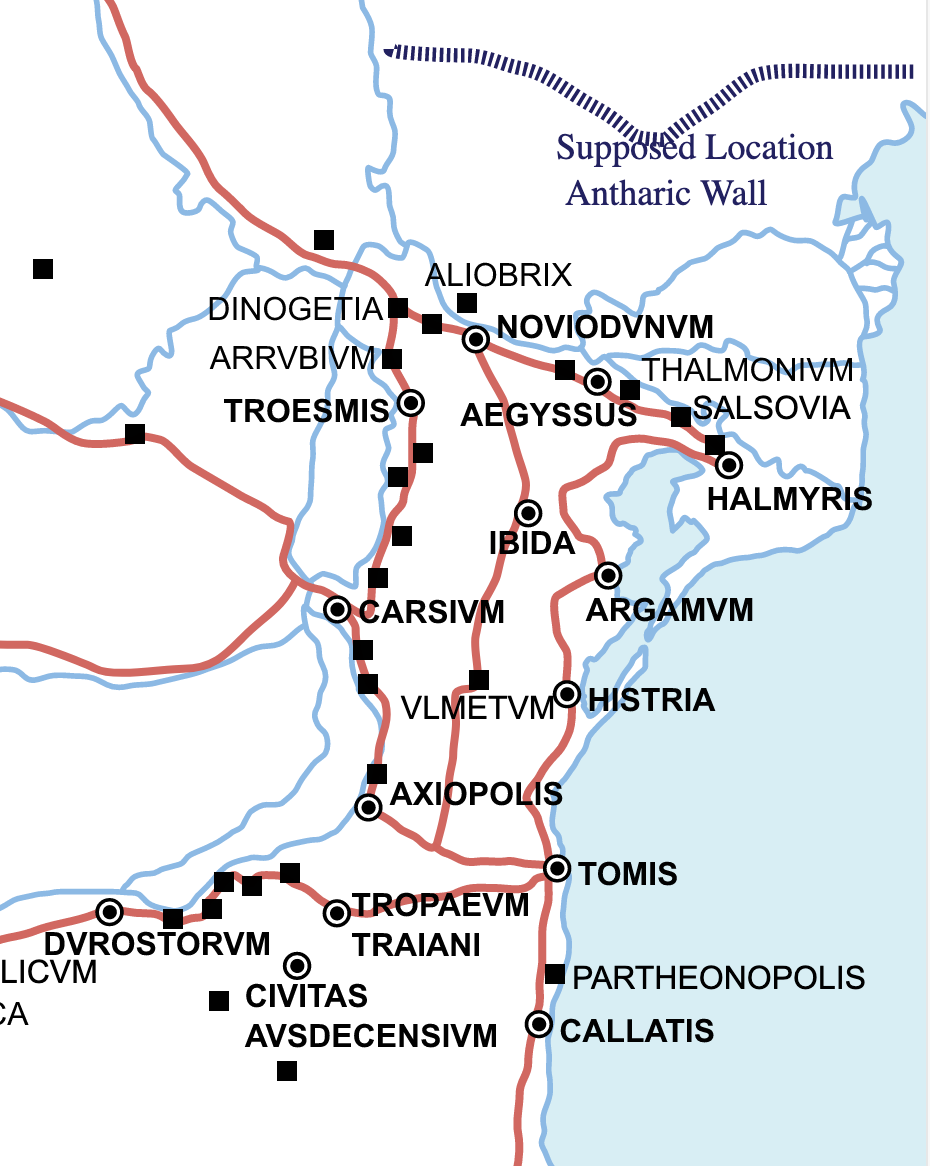
Eastern Moesia: cities and roads

== History ==
=== Iron Age ===
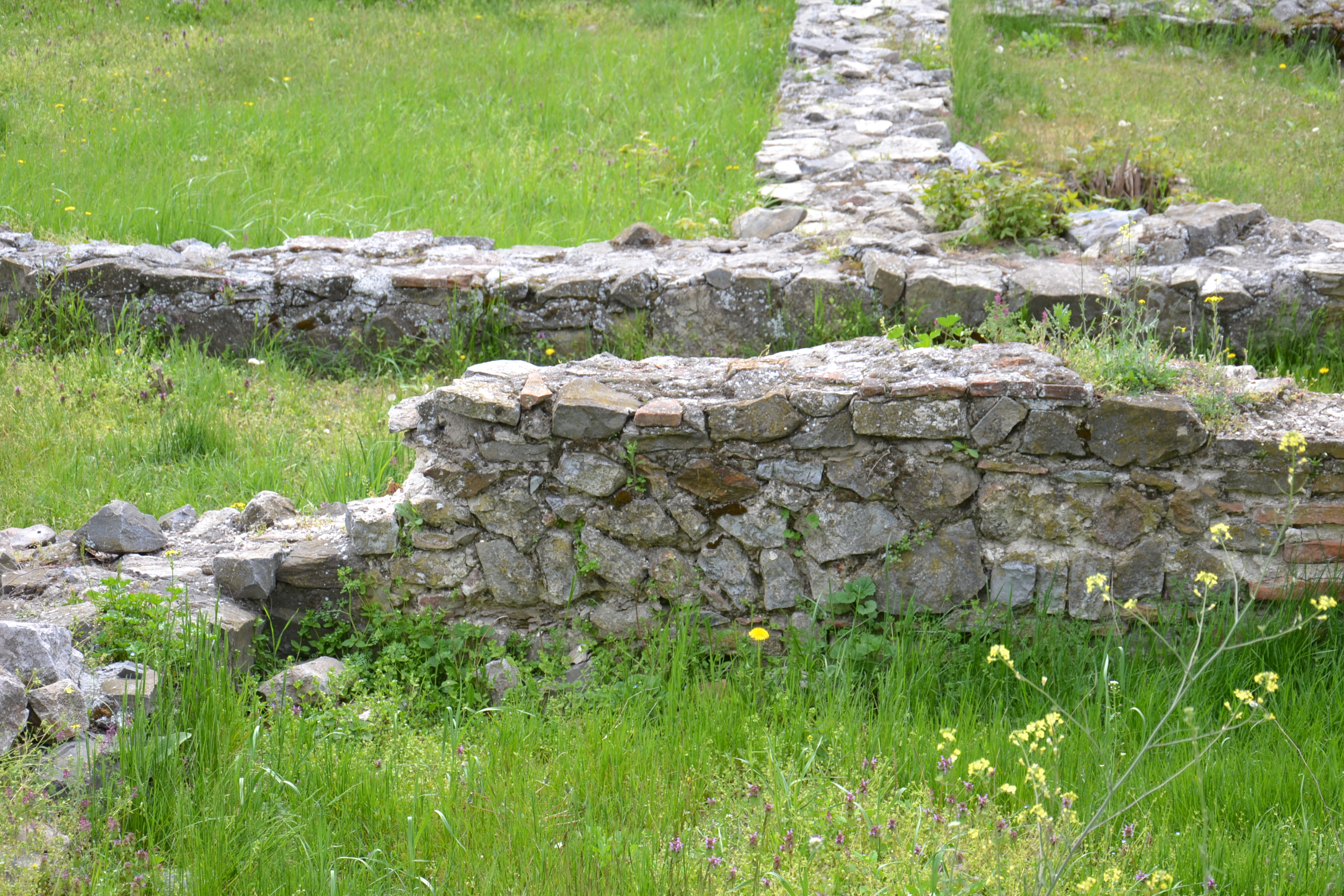
Ruins of Aegyssus

Tulcea was founded in the 7th century BC under the name of Aegyssus, mentioned by Procopius. Ovid recorded a local tradition that ascribed its name to a mythical founder, Aegisos the Caspian.

=== Roman period ===
Aegyssus was built on a high hill, a strategic location for guarding the Danube particularly under the Romans. The amphorae discovered from 1st century BC to 1st century AD suggest the town was an important trading centre of the period.

After the Getic raids from 12–15 AD the Romans conquered the town and soon after built a new city.

After Trajan's Dacian Wars at the beginning of the 2nd century AD, the city was included in the Moesian Limes defensive frontier system as a military fort and port for a detachment of the Classis Flavia Moesica.

The baths were built at the end of the 1st century AD and used until the beginning of the 5th century after several reconstruction phases, in the third of which a large palaestra was added on the north side.

In the second half of the 3rd century AD, the cohors II Flavia Brittonum (from Britain) was garrisoned here, and in the next century the vexillatio Aegyssensis of Legio I Iovia. During the 4th-5th centuries, the city still preserved its military statute (headquarters of cuneus equitum armigerorum, praefectus ripae legionis primae ariae cohortium quinque pedaturae inferioris). It was destroyed during the Hun's invasions in the 5th century and rebuilt under Justinian I along with the monumental reconstruction of the Danubian limes.

=== Middle Ages ===
The town was abandoned by the first half of the 7th century after the Avars-Slavs' attacks and the downfall of Danubian limes. The town is mentioned in Notitia Episcopatuum and De Thematibus on the list of the bishoprics of Dobrudja.

Inhabitation was restored in the second half of the 10th century, as the Byzantines built a fort on the spot after reconquering the region. The fort was soon destroyed in 1064 by an attack of the Uzes, however some inhabitation continued. A settlement, larger than the one in the 11th century, is archaeologically attested beginning with the 14th century. The Ottoman rule was imposed around 1420, and would last for the following four centuries.

=== Later history ===
The town was first documented under its modern name in 1506 in the Ottoman customs records, described as an "important centre for the transit trade".

Around 1848, it was still a small shipyard city, being awarded city status in 1860, when it became a province capital. It became a sanjak centre in Silistre Eyaleti in 1860 and Tuna Vilayeti in 1864.

In 1853, The Times of London noted that "Toultcha" was "the last fortified place held by the Turks on the Danube, and which has a garrison of 1,200 men."

During the Russo-Turkish War of 1877–1878, Northern Dobruja and specially Tulcea would be the sites of massacres and conflicts between Muslim Circassians and Christian Bulgarians, Russians, and Ukrainians. The Circassians of Dobruja had settled there in 1864 after the Circassian genocide, and through their raids to other peoples of the region and handing over part of their gains to the Ottoman authorities, they would end up indirectly financing the construction of buildings that still stand in Tulcea today: the modern Tulcea Art Museum and the Azizyie Mosque. The Dobrujan Circassians were expelled from the region after the end of the war.

In 1878, after the end of the war, Tulcea was awarded to Romania, together with the rest of Northern Dobruja (see Congress of Berlin). Tulcea was occupied by the Central Powers between 1916–1918 during World War I, and became part of their condominium following the Treaty of Bucharest in May 1918 (until November 1918). During that time, the statue of Mircea the Elder was taken down by Bulgarian troops, since it was during his reign that Dobruja was incorporated into Wallachia.

== Climate ==
Tulcea's climate is transitional between continental and temperate (Köppen: Dfa/Cfa), with cold winters and hot summers. Daily minimum temperatures drop below 0 °C (32 °F) for roughly 79.5 days per year from October to April, with 17.2 days where the daily maximum temperature is also below 0 °C (32 °F). Snow cover, on average, is observed for 27.6 days per year.

Climate data for Tulcea (1991–2020)
Month	Jan	Feb	Mar	Apr	May	Jun	Jul	Aug	Sep	Oct	Nov	Dec	Year
Record high °C (°F)	19.5 (67.1)	23.5 (74.3)	28.6 (83.5)	31.1 (88.0)	36.1 (97.0)	38.3 (100.9)	39.9 (103.8)	39.8 (103.6)	34.7 (94.5)	33.0 (91.4)	25.7 (78.3)	20.8 (69.4)	39.9 (103.8)
Mean daily maximum °C (°F)	3.9 (39.0)	6.2 (43.2)	11.1 (52.0)	17.2 (63.0)	23.2 (73.8)	27.5 (81.5)	29.7 (85.5)	29.6 (85.3)	24.1 (75.4)	17.8 (64.0)	11.2 (52.2)	5.5 (41.9)	17.2 (63.0)
Daily mean °C (°F)	0.0 (32.0)	1.6 (34.9)	5.8 (42.4)	11.4 (52.5)	17.3 (63.1)	21.7 (71.1)	23.7 (74.7)	23.1 (73.6)	17.7 (63.9)	12.0 (53.6)	6.7 (44.1)	1.7 (35.1)	11.9 (53.4)
Mean daily minimum °C (°F)	−3.3 (26.1)	−2.0 (28.4)	1.6 (34.9)	6.3 (43.3)	11.6 (52.9)	15.7 (60.3)	17.6 (63.7)	16.9 (62.4)	12.2 (54.0)	7.4 (45.3)	3.1 (37.6)	−1.6 (29.1)	7.1 (44.8)
Record low °C (°F)	−20.9 (−5.6)	−18.9 (−2.0)	−15.9 (3.4)	−5.0 (23.0)	0.8 (33.4)	4.6 (40.3)	9.6 (49.3)	7.1 (44.8)	0.6 (33.1)	−7.6 (18.3)	−13.4 (7.9)	−20.7 (−5.3)	−20.9 (−5.6)
Average precipitation mm (inches)	35.3 (1.39)	26.6 (1.05)	33.3 (1.31)	36.4 (1.43)	43.7 (1.72)	57.2 (2.25)	58.0 (2.28)	31.5 (1.24)	44.8 (1.76)	44.3 (1.74)	41.2 (1.62)	41.9 (1.65)	494.2 (19.46)
Average precipitation days (≥ 1.0 mm)	4.9	5.0	5.4	5.9	6.3	6.0	5.4	3.6	4.3	4.5	4.7	6.1	62.1
Mean monthly sunshine hours	80.9	111.5	159.2	212.3	280.4	306.7	339.7	314.3	232.0	163.9	92.8	77.1	2,370.8
Source 1: NOAA
Source 2: Meteomanz (extremes since 2021)

== Demographics ==
At the 2021 census Tulcea had a population of 65,624 with a majority of Romanians (74.83%) with minorities of Lipovans (1.9%), Roma (1.57%), Turks (0.67%), Ukrainians (0.42%), Greeks (0.27%), Bulgarians (0.03%), others (0.38%) and unknown (19.93%).

At the 2011 census Tulcea had a population of 73,707 with a majority of Romanians (83.37%) with minorities of Lipovans (2.36%), Roma (1.29%), Turks (1.11%), Ukrainians (0.51%), Greeks (0.28%), Bulgarians (0.02%), others (0.53%) and unknown (10.53%).

Most of the indigenous Bulgarians left the city after the Treaty of Craiova.

Historical population
Year	Pop.	±%
1912	21,727	—
1930	20,403	−6.1%
1948	21,642	+6.1%
1956	24,639	+13.8%
1966	35,561	+44.3%
1977	61,729	+73.6%
1992	97,904	+58.6%
2002	92,762	−5.3%
2011	73,707	−20.5%
2021	65,624	−11.0%
Source: Census data

Ethnicity	2011	2021
Total	73,707	65,624
Romanian	61,451 (83.37%)	49,108 (74.83%)
Lipovan	1,738 (2.36%)	1,244 (1.9%)
Roma	953 (1.29%)	1,031 (1.57%)
Turkish	819 (1.11%)	438 (0.67%)
Ukrainian	376 (0.51%)	278 (0.42%)
Greek	208 (0.28%)	178 (0.27%)
Bulgarian	15 (0.02%)	17 (0.03%)
Others	385 (0.53%)	251 (0.38%)
Unknown	7762 (10.53%)	13,079 (19.93%)

== Culture ==
Tulcea is the site of the "George Georgescu Contest", a music competition created by teachers at the Tulcea Arts High School and held annually since 1992. Named in honor of the conductor George Georgescu (1887–1964), an important figure in the development of Romanian classical music who was born in the Tulcea county, the contest was at first open only to Romanian music school and high school students but began admitting international students in 1995. Organizers include the Romanian Ministry of Education and Youth, the Education Board of Tulcea County, the Tulcea County Council, the Tulcea Mayoralty, and surviving members of Georgescu's family.

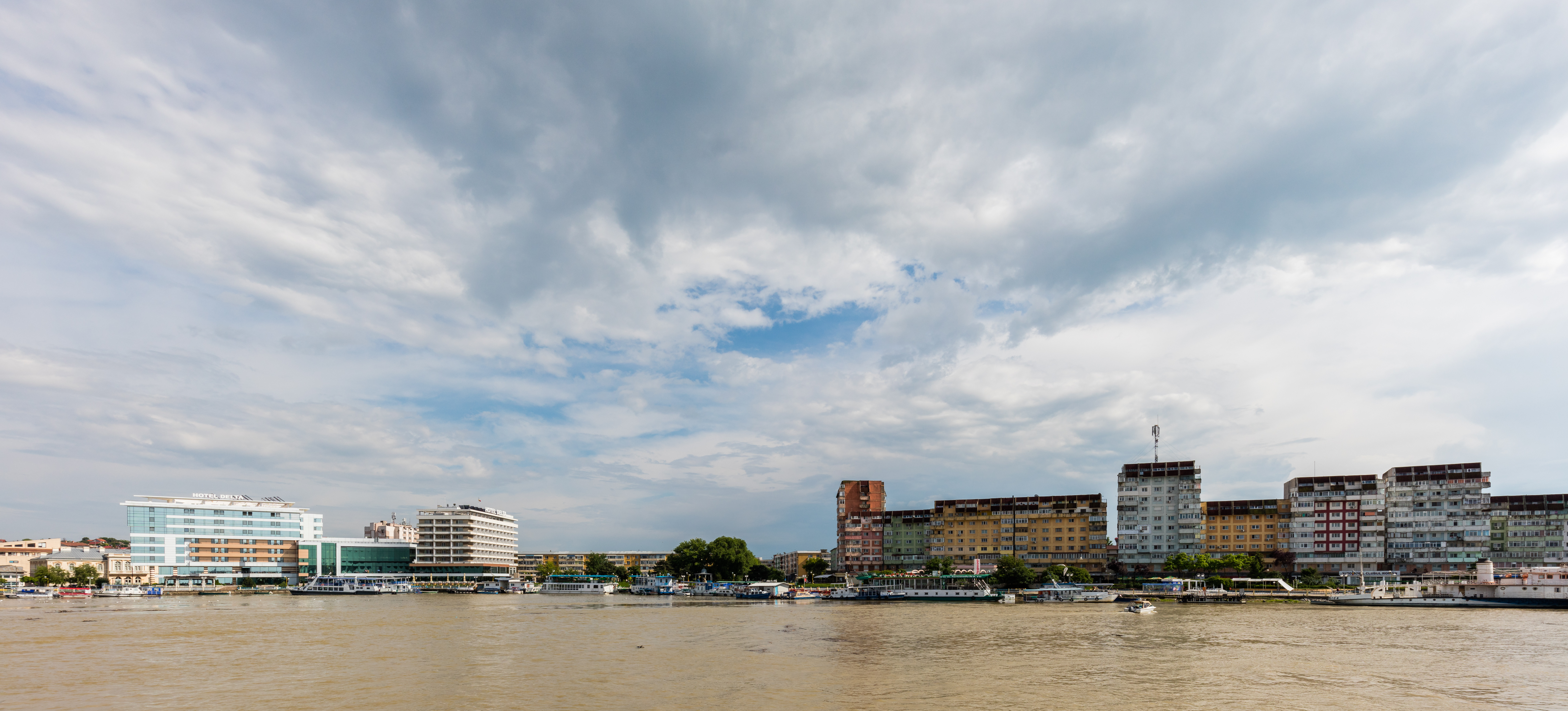
Port of Tulcea (2016)

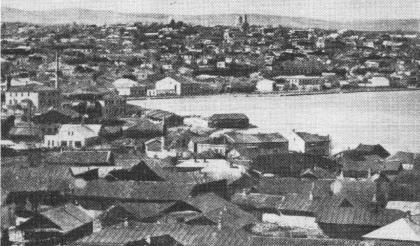
Tulcea at the end of the 19th century

The Monument of Independence represents one of the main attractions of the city, because of its placement and of the panoramic view that it offers. It is located on the same hill as the ruins of Aegyssus and the history museum. The monument itself is represented by an obelisk with a statue of an eagle on one side and the statue of a soldier on the other. The monument was erected to commemorate the War of Independence that made Dobruja part of Romania. Construction began on October 17, 1879, in the presence of Prince Carol I of Romania.

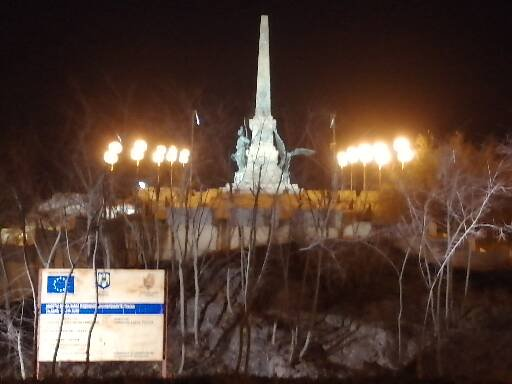
The Monument of independence - Tulcea

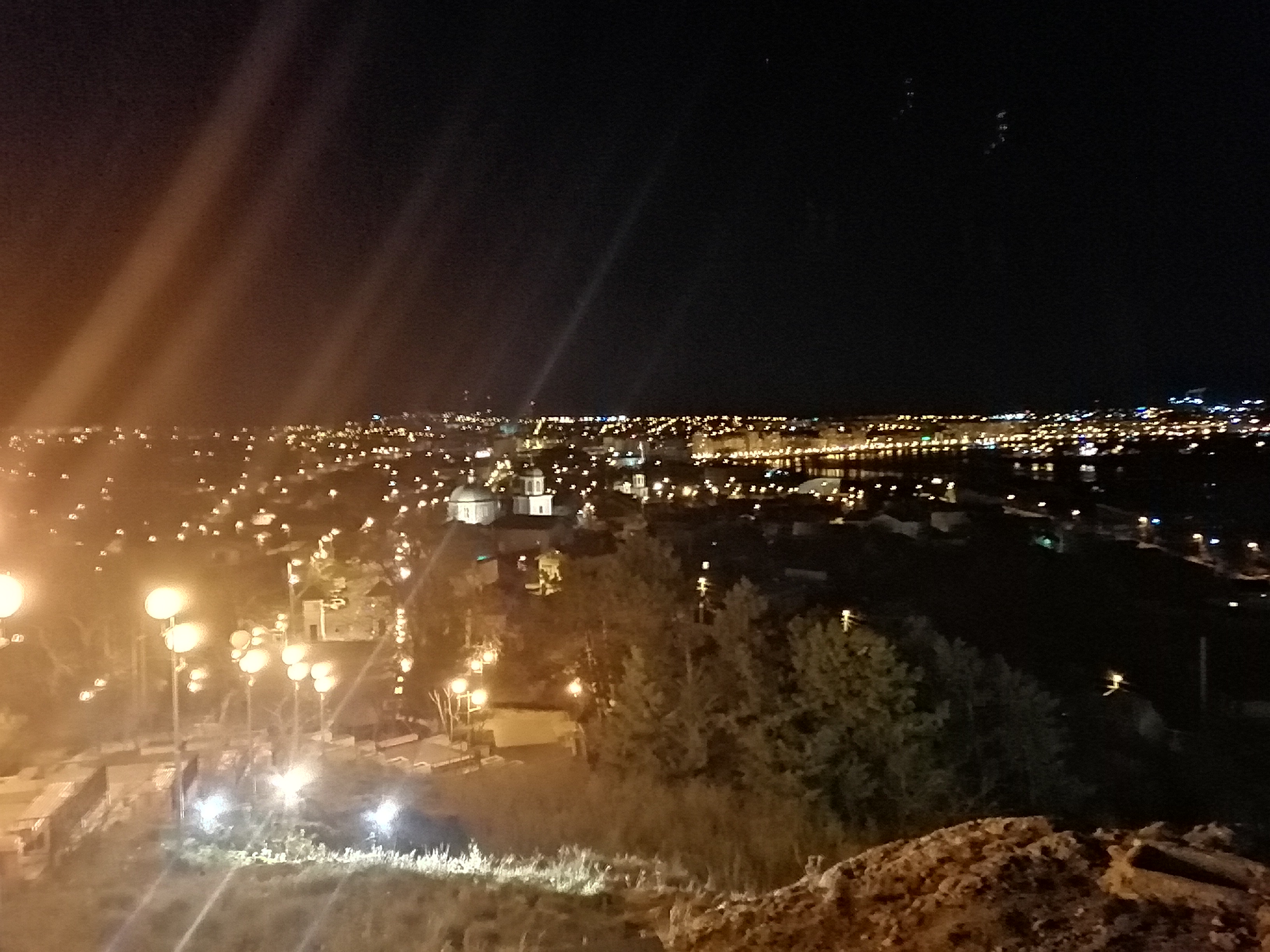
The city viewed from the top of the monument hill at night

The main high school is the Spiru Haret Dobrujan College.

== Notable people ==
- Crin Antonescu (born 1959), former President of the Senate of Romania and acting President of Romania in 2012
- Georges Boulanger (1893–1958), violinist
- Alexandru Ciucurencu (1903–1977), painter
- Stefan Karadzha (1840–1868), Bulgarian revolutionary, studied in Tulcea and is associated with the town
- Grigore Moisil (1906–1973), mathematician
- Dimitar Petkov (1858–1907), Bulgarian Prime Minister
- Mirela Roznoveanu (born 1947), literary critic, writer, and journalist
- Valentin Serbu (1934–1994), writer
- Tora Vasilescu (born 1951), actress

== Twin towns – sister cities ==
Tulcea is twinned with:

- Aalborg, Denmark
- Altena, Netherlands
- Amasya, Turkey
- Aprilia, Italy
- Fratta Polesine, Italy
- Ilion, Greece
- Izmail, Ukraine
- Larnaca, Cyprus
- Mudanya, Turkey
- Rovigo, Italy
- Shumen, Bulgaria
