= Demographics of Istanbul =

- Population pyramid of Istanbul in 2022
- Population: 15,701,602 (2024)

Historical populations

Pre-Republic
Year	Pop.
100	36,000
361	300,000
500	400,000
541	500,000
7th c.	350,000
8th c.	500,000
9th c.	250,000
1000	500,000
1100	400,000
1200	200,000
1261	100,000
1350	80,000
1453	45,000
1500	200,000
1550	660,000
1700	700,000
1815	500,000
1860	715,000
1890	874,000
1900	942,900

Republic
Year	Pop.	±% p.a.
1927	794,444	—
1935	883,599	+1.34%
1940	991,237	+2.33%
1945	1,078,399	+1.70%
1950	1,166,477	+1.58%
1955	1,533,822	+5.63%
1960	1,882,092	+4.18%
1965	2,293,823	+4.04%
1970	3,019,032	+5.65%
1975	3,904,588	+5.28%
1980	4,741,890	+3.96%
1985	5,842,985	+4.26%
1990	7,309,190	+4.58%
2000	10,018,735	+3.20%
2007	12,573,836	+3.30%
2008	12,697,164	+0.98%
2009	12,915,158	+1.72%
2010	13,255,685	+2.64%
2011	13,624,240	+2.78%
2012	13,854,740	+1.69%
2013	14,160,467	+2.21%
2014	14,377,018	+1.53%
2015	14,657,434	+1.95%
2016	14,804,116	+1.00%
2017	15,029,231	+1.52%
2018	15,067,724	+0.26%
2019	15,519,267	+3.00%
2020	15,462,452	−0.37%
2021	15,840,900	+2.45%
2022	15,907,951	+0.42%
2023	15,655,924	−1.58%
2024	15,701,602	+0.29%

Pre-Republic figures estimated (Note: Historians disagree—sometimes substantially—on population figures of Istanbul (Constantinople), and other world cities, prior to the 20th century. A follow-up to Chandler & Fox 1974,Chandler 1987, pp. 463–505 examines different sources' estimates and chooses the most likely based on historical conditions; it is the source of most population figures between 100 and 1914. The ranges of values between 500 and 1000 are due to Morris 2010, which also does a comprehensive analysis of sources, including Chandler (1987); Morris notes that many of Chandler's estimates during that time seem too large for the city's size, and presents smaller estimates. Chandler disagrees with Turan 2010 on the population of the city in the mid-1920s (with the former suggesting 817,000 in 1925), but Turan, p. 224, is used as the source of population figures between 1924 and 2005. Turan's figures, as well as the 2010 figure, come from the Turkish Statistical Institute. The drastic increase in population between 1980 and 1985 is largely due to an enlargement of the city's limits (see the Administration section). Explanations for population changes in pre-Republic times can be inferred from the History section.)

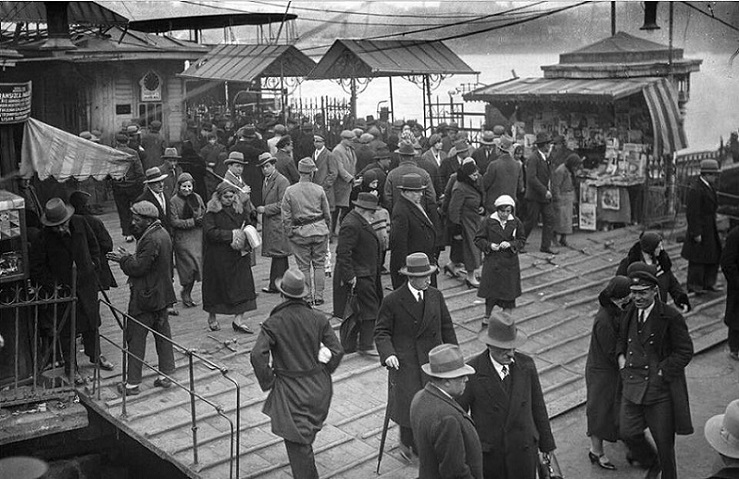
People at the commuter ferry quay of Karaköy in Istanbul in the 1930s

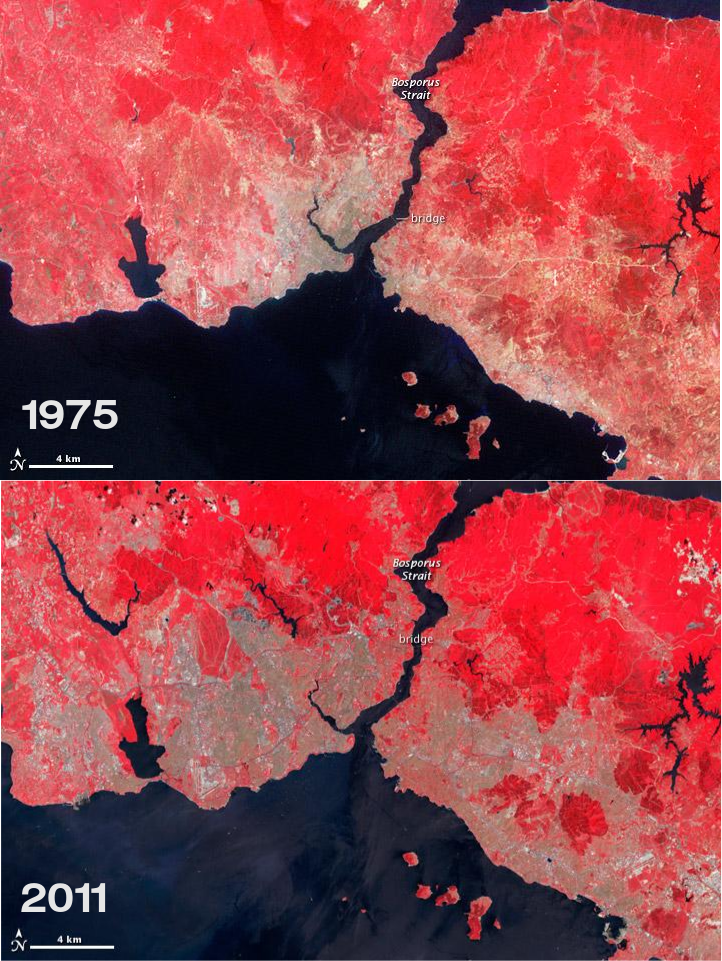
Two maps comparing the size of urban areas in Istanbul (indicated as the grey zones) in 1975 and 2011

Throughout most of its history, Istanbul has ranked among the largest cities in the world. By 500 CE, Constantinople had somewhere between 400,000 and 500,000 people, edging out its predecessor, Rome, for world's largest city. Constantinople jostled with other major historical cities, such as Baghdad, Chang'an, Kaifeng and Merv for the position of world's most populous city until the 12th century. It never returned to being the world's largest, but remained Europe's largest city from 1500 to 1750, when it was surpassed by London.

The Turkish Statistical Institute estimates that the population of Istanbul Metropolitan Municipality was 15,701,602 at the end of 2024, hosting 18 percent of the country's population. Then about 97–98% of the inhabitants of the metropolitan municipality were within city limits, up from 89% in 2007 and 61% in 1980. 64.9% of the residents live on the European side and 35.1% on the Asian side. While the city ranks as the world's 5th-largest city proper, it drops to the 24th place as an urban area and to the 18th place as a metro area because the city limits are roughly equivalent to the agglomeration. Today, it forms one of the largest urban agglomerations in Europe, alongside Moscow. (Note: The United Nations defines an urban agglomeration as "the population contained within the contours of a contiguous territory inhabited at urban density levels without regard to administrative boundaries". The agglomeration "usually incorporates the population in a city or town plus that in the suburban areas lying outside of, but being adjacent to, the city boundaries".) The city's annual population growth of 3.45 percent ranks as the highest among the seventy-eight largest metropolises in the Organisation for Economic Co-operation and Development. The high population growth mirrors an urbanization trend across the country, as the second and third fastest-growing OECD metropolises are the Turkish cities of İzmir and Ankara.

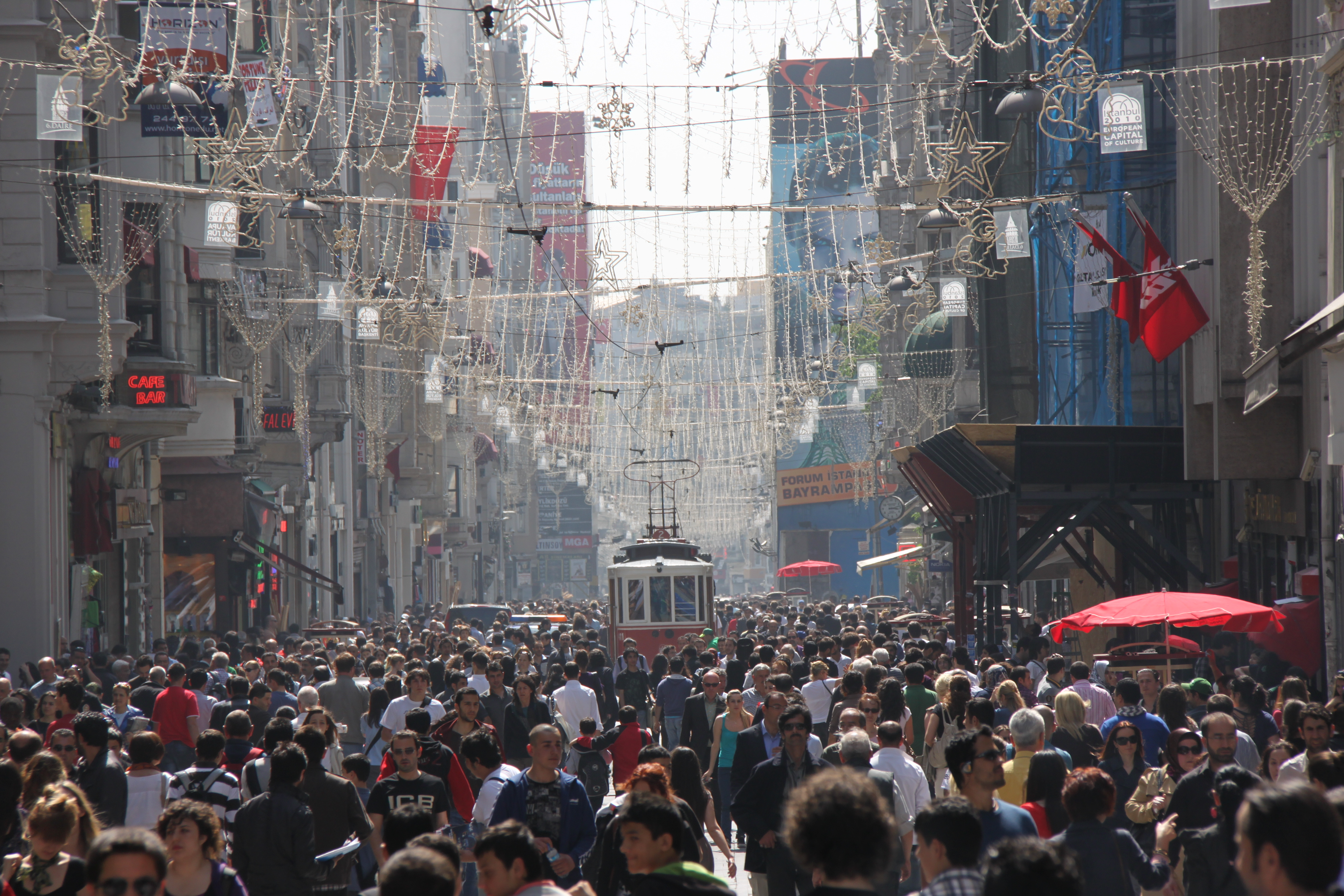
İstiklal Avenue is visited by nearly three million people on weekend days.

Istanbul experienced especially rapid growth during the second half of the 20th century, with its population increasing tenfold between 1950 and 2000. This growth in population comes, in part, from an expansion of city limits—particularly between 1980 and 1985, when the number of Istanbulites nearly doubled. The remarkable growth was, and still is, largely fueled by migrants from eastern Turkey seeking employment and improved living conditions. The number of residents of Istanbul originating from seven northern and eastern provinces is greater than the populations of their entire respective provinces; Sivas and Kastamonu each account for more than half a million residents of Istanbul. Istanbul's foreign population, by comparison, was very small, 42,228 residents in 2007. Only 28 percent of the city's residents are originally from Istanbul. The most densely populated areas tend to lie to the northwest, west, and southwest of the city center, on the European side; the most densely populated district on the Asian side is Üsküdar. As of 2023, Istanbul has Turkey’s biggest foreign migrant population, with 34.5% of foreign nationals in Turkey living there.

== Religious groups ==
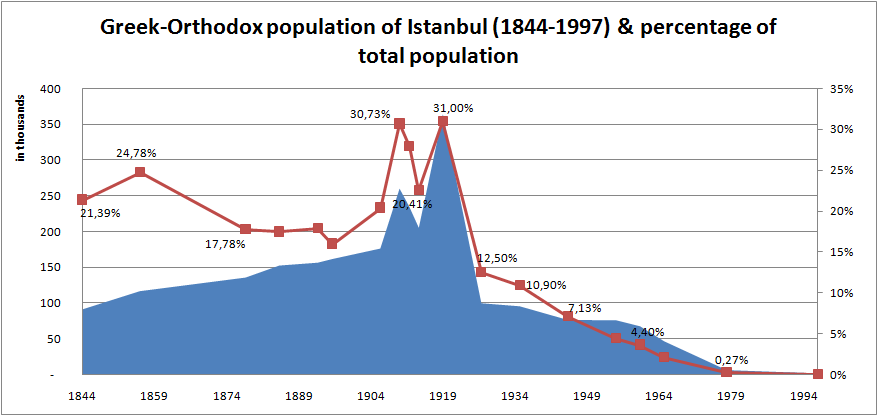
Greek population in Istanbul and percentages of the city population (1844–1997). The 1923 population exchange between Greece and Turkey, the 1942 wealth tax, and the Istanbul pogrom in 1955 contributed to the sharp decrease of the Greek community.

Istanbul has been a cosmopolitan city throughout much of its history, but it has become more homogenized since the end of the Ottoman Empire. The vast majority of people across Turkey, and in Istanbul, are Muslim, and more specifically members of the Sunni branch of Islam. Most Sunni Turks follow the Hanafi school of Islamic thought, while Sunni Kurds tend to follow the Shafi'i school. The largest non-Sunni Muslim group, accounting 10-20% of Turkey's population, are the Alevis; a third of all Alevis in the country live in Istanbul. Mystic movements, like Sufism, were officially banned after the establishment of the Turkish Republic, but they still boast numerous followers. Istanbul is a migrant city. Since the 1950s, Istanbul's population has increased from 1 million to about 10 million residents. Almost 200,000 new immigrants, many of them from Turkey's own villages, continue to arrive each year. As a result, the city is constantly changing and being reshaped to meet the needs of these new arrivals.

The Patriarch of Constantinople has been designated Ecumenical Patriarch since the sixth century, and has come to be regarded as the leader of the world's 300 million Orthodox Christians. Since 1601, the Patriarchate has been based in Istanbul's Church of St. George. Into the 19th century, the Christians of Istanbul tended to be either Greek Orthodox, members of the Armenian Apostolic Church or Catholic Levantines. Today, most of Turkey's remaining Greek, Armenian and Assyrian minorities live in or near Istanbul.

Eldem Edhem, in his entry on "Istanbul" in the Encyclopedia of the Ottoman Empire, wrote that about 50% of the residents of the city were Muslim at the turn of the 20th century.

== Ethnic groups ==
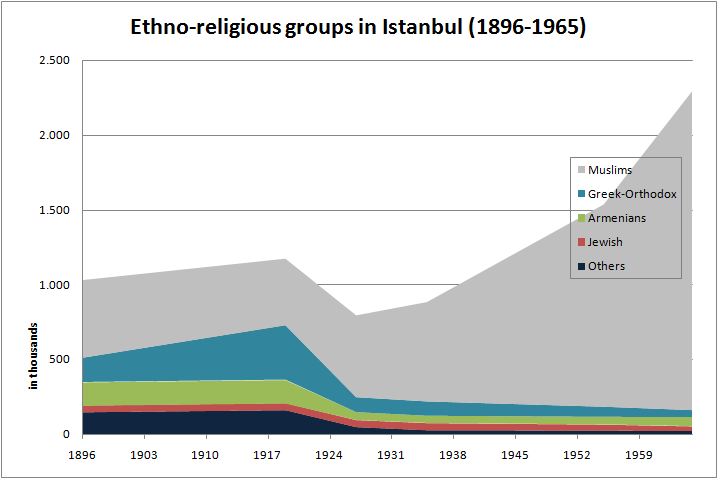
Ethno-religious groups in Istanbul (1896–1965). A multicultural city in 1896, with a 50.5% Muslim population, turned into a predominantly Muslim one after 1925.

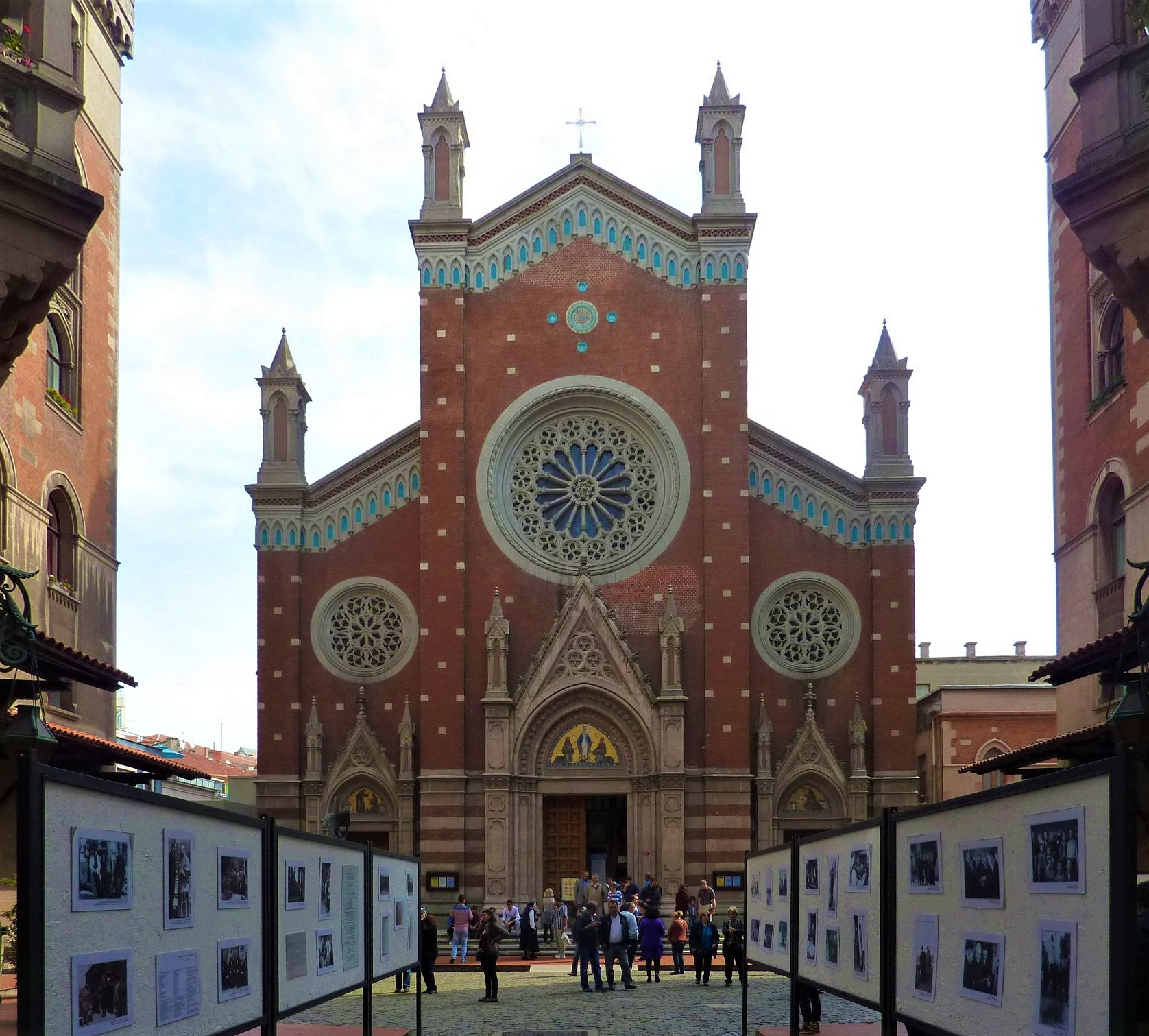
The Church of St. Anthony of Padua on İstiklal Avenue in Beyoğlu (Pera) is the largest Catholic church in Turkey.

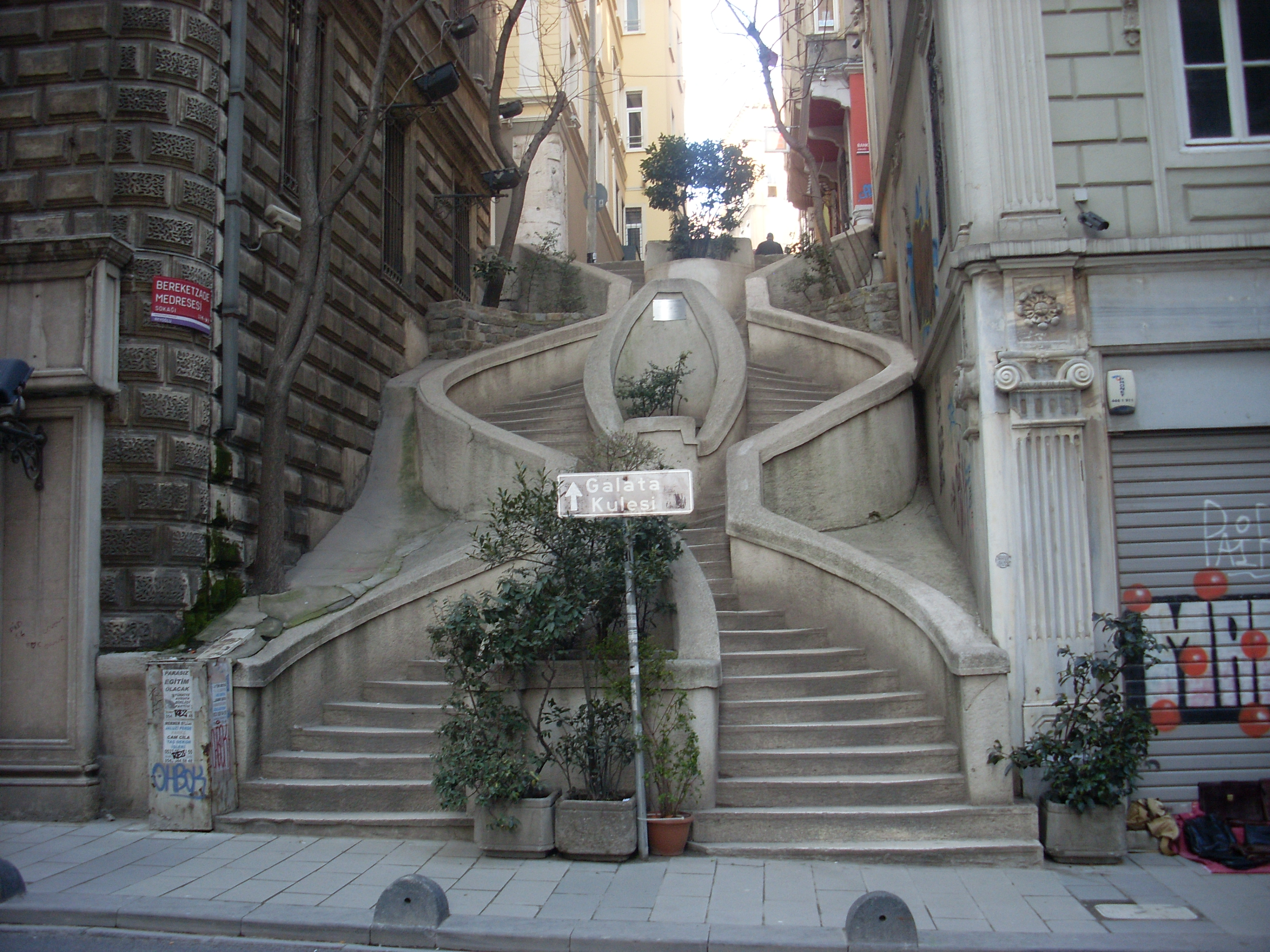
Camondo Steps at Bankalar Caddesi (Banks Street) in Galata, constructed by Ottoman-Venetian Jewish banker Abraham Salomon Camondo, c. 1870–1880

=== Arabs ===
The Arabic newspaper Al Jawaib began in Ottoman Constantinople, established by Ahmad Faris al-Shidyaq a.k.a. Ahmed Faris Efendi (1804–1887), after 1860. It published Ottoman laws in Arabic, including the Ottoman Constitution of 1876.

Besides the large communities of both foreign and Turkish Arabs in Istanbul and other large cities, most live in the south and southeast. Most Turkish Arabs in Istanbul are Sunni Muslim, while the remaining consists mainly Arab Christians (Antiochian Greek Christians) and Alawites.

Istanbul, the most populous city in Turkey, hosts the highest number of Syrian refugees, with approximately 550,000 registered people.

=== Armenians ===
As of 2015 there are between 50,000 and 70,000 Armenians in Istanbul (0.3-0.5%), down from about 164,000 according to the Ottoman Census of 1913 (14.5%). In late 1918, Celal Nuri İleri reported that there were around 200,000 Armenians in Istanbul (~17%).

=== Bulgarians ===
Bulgarian newspapers in the late Ottoman period published in Constantinople were Makedoniya, Napredŭk or Napredǎk ("Progress"), Pravo, and Turtsiya; Johann Strauss, author of "A Constitution for a Multilingual Empire," described the last one as "probably a Bulgarian version of [the French-language paper] La Turquie." By the end of the 19th century, the Bulgarian population of Istanbul numbered between 40,000 and 50,000 people.

=== Greeks ===
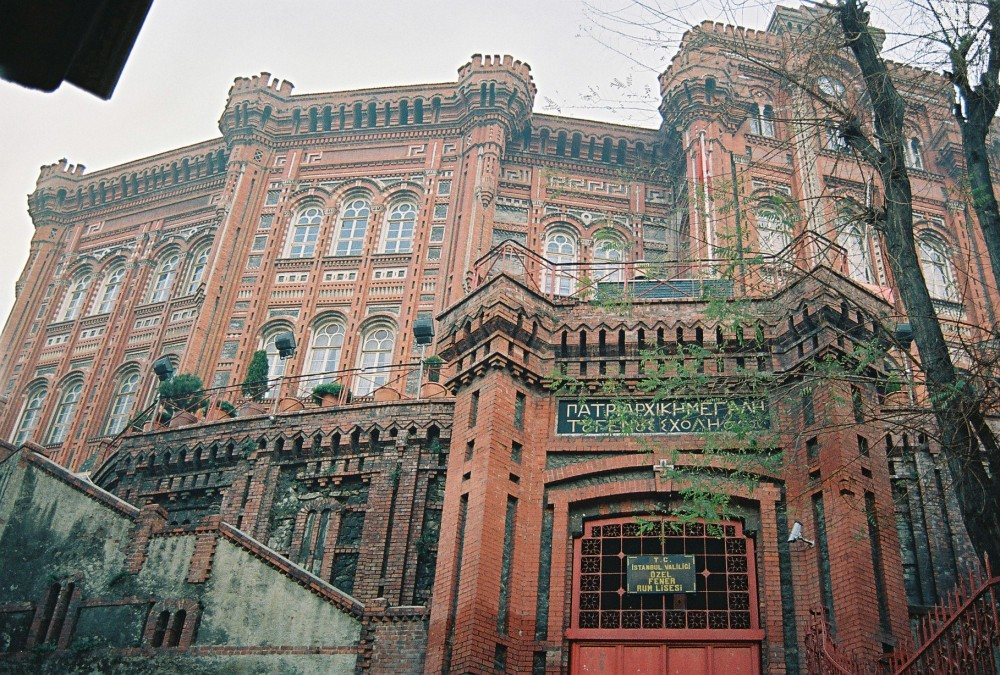
Phanar Greek Orthodox College is a Greek minority school was founded in Ottoman Empire in 1454.

Constantinople had a majority Greek population from the 8th century BCE until the Ottoman conquest in 1453.

After 1453, there remained a group of prominent ethnic Greeks and/or people adopting Greek culture, the Phanariotes, based in the neighbourhood of Phanar, now Fener, in Fatih. About eleven families were a part of the Phanariotes.

The city remained a centre of Greek cultural and political life, and Greeks were a visible presence in the city. According to the Ottoman census of 1893, Greeks made up almost 30% of the city's population, while accounting for 43% of the population in the suburbs. As the city was also home to significant Armenian, Catholic and Jewish minorities, there were more non-Muslims than Muslims in Istanbul, with Muslims making up 44% of the city's population in 1893. The Greek community also dominated the city's economy, owning 50% of the city's total production and distribution capital in 1915. In 1919, of the city's 1,173,670 inhabitants, 364,459 were Greek (31%) and 449,114 were Turk (38%). Because of considerable presence of other non-Muslim ethnic groups like Armenians (17%), Bulgarians (3%) and the Jews (4%) at the time, Muslims were a minority in the city.

Because of events during the 20th century, the 1923 population exchange between Greece and Turkey, a 1942 wealth tax, and the 1955 Istanbul riots—the Greek population, originally centered in Fener and Samatya, has decreased substantially.

At the start of the 21st century, Istanbul's Greek population numbered 3,000 (down from 260,000 out of 850,000 according to the Ottoman Census of 1910, and a peak of 350,000 in 1919).

Even with these reduced numbers, there remains a Greek-language newspaper, Apoyevmatini, in active circulation.

=== Jews ===
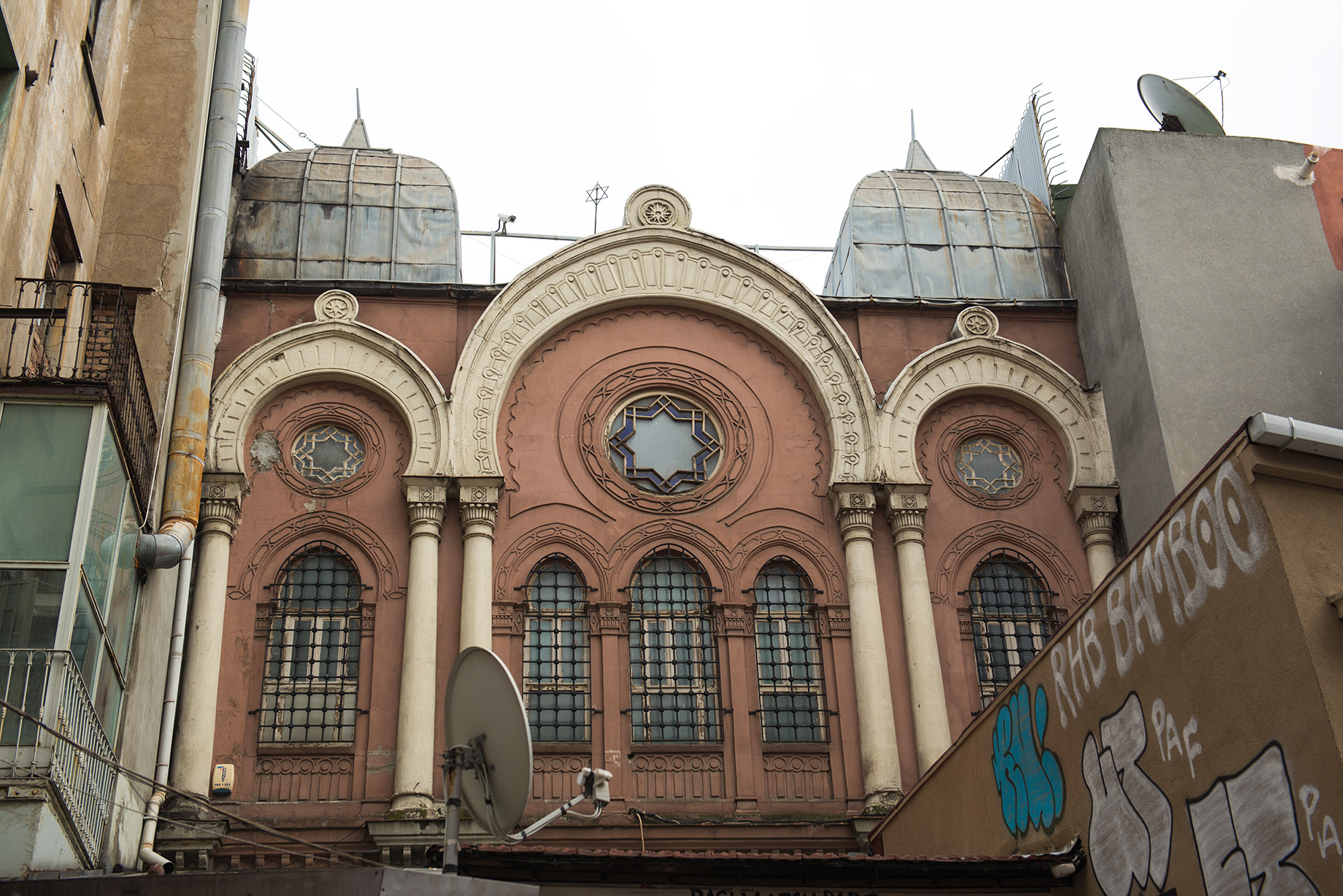
Ashkenazi Synagogue of Istanbul

The neighbourhood of Balat used to be home to a sizable Sephardi Jewish community, first formed after their expulsion from Spain in 1492. At the start of the World War I, there were 52,153 Jews (4%) in the city, which fell to 47,035 (7%) by 1927. Romaniotes and Ashkenazi Jews resided in Istanbul even before the Sephardim, but their proportion has since dwindled; today, 1 percent of Istanbul's Jews are Ashkenazi. In large part due to emigration to Israel, the Jewish population nationwide dropped from 100,000 in 1950 to 18,000 in 2005, with the majority living in either Istanbul or İzmir. As of 2022, the Jewish population in Turkey is around 14,500.

=== Kurds ===
The largest ethnic minority in Istanbul is the Kurdish community, originating from eastern and southeastern Turkey. Although the Kurdish presence in the city dates back to the early Ottoman period, the influx of Kurds into the city has accelerated since the beginning of the Kurdish–Turkish conflict with the PKK (i.e. since the late 1970s). About two to four million residents of Istanbul are Kurdish, meaning there are more Kurds in Istanbul than in any other city in the world.

=== Levantines ===
The Levantines, Latin Christians who settled in Galata during the Ottoman period, played a seminal role in shaping the culture and architecture of then-Constantinople during the 19th and early 20th centuries; their population in Istanbul has dwindled, but they remain in the city in small numbers.

=== Romani ===
There is a Roma community Istanbul.

=== Turks ===
Parallel to the overall demographics of Turkey, Turks are the largest group in Istanbul. Although the presence of Turks in Istanbul goes back to the early Ottoman times, the bulk of this population is composed of recent migrants from the Balkans and Anatolia.

=== Other ethnicities ===
There are other significant ethnic minorities as well, the Bosniaks are the main people of an entire district—Bayrampaşa.

From the increase in mutual cooperation between Turkey and several African States like Somalia and Djibouti, several young students and workers have been migrating to Istanbul in search of better education and employment opportunities. c. 2015 the major areas of African settlement are Eminönü and Yenikapi in Fatih, and Kurtulus and Osmanbey in Şişli. The largest groups of Africans that year were from Nigeria and Somalia, with the latter often working in business and the manufacturing of clothing. There are also Cameroonian, Congolese, and Senegalese communities present, with the first group directly involved in the vending of clothing and the last involved in the sale of goods streetside.

As of 2011 about 900 Japanese persons resided in Istanbul; 768 were officially registered with the Japanese Consulate of Istanbul as of October 2010. Of those living in Istanbul, about 450–500 are employees of Japanese companies and their family members, making up around half of the total Japanese population. Others include students of Turkish language and culture, business owners, and Japanese women married to Turkish men. Istanbul has several Japanese restaurants, a Japanese newspaper, and a 32-page Japanese magazine. According to the Istanbul Japanese School, circa 2019 there were about 2,000 Japanese citizens in the Istanbul area, with about 100 of them being children of the ages in which, in Japan, they would be legally required to attend school. At the same period there were about 110 Japanese companies in operation in the city. Istanbul also has a weekend Japanese education programme, The Japanese Saturday School in Istanbul.

After the Romanian revolution, a significant number of Romanian entrepreneurs started investing and establishing business ventures in Turkey, and a certain proportion chose to take up residence there in Istanbul. There are also Romanian migrant workers, as well as students and artists living in the city. Some sources claim that there are 14,000 Romanians living in Istanbul. There is also a Romanian Orthodox Church in the city.

Russians began migrating to Turkey during the first half of the 1990s. Most had fled the economic problems prevalent after the dissolution of the Soviet Union. During this period, many intermarried and assimilated with locals, bringing a rapid increase in mixed marriages. Following the 2022 Russian invasion of Ukraine, many Russians have fled to Turkey, especially Istanbul, after Vladimir Putin announced a "partial mobilization" of military reservists.

== See also ==
- Demographics of Turkey

== Notes ==
=== Bibliography ===
- ʻAner, Nadav (2005). Pergola, Sergio Della; Gilboa, Amos; Ṭal, Rami (eds.). The Jewish People Policy Planning Institute Planning Assessment, 2004–2005: The Jewish People Between Thriving and Decline. Jerusalem: Gefen Publishing House Ltd. ISBN 978-965-229-346-6.
- Athanasopulos, Haralambos (2001). Greece, Turkey, and the Aegean Sea: A Case Study in International Law. Jefferson, NC: McFarland & Company, Inc. ISBN 978-0-7864-0943-3.
- Brink-Danan, Marcy (2011). Jewish Life in Twenty-First-Century Turkey: The Other Side of Tolerance. New Anthropologies of Europe. Bloomington, IN: Indiana University Press. ISBN 978-0-253-35690-1.
- Çelik, Zeynep (1993). The Remaking of Istanbul: Portrait of an Ottoman City in the Nineteenth Century. Berkeley and Los Angeles: University of California Press. ISBN 978-0-520-08239-7.
- Chandler, Tertius (1987). Four Thousand Years of Urban Growth: An Historical Census. Lewiston, NY: St. David's University Press. ISBN 978-0-88946-207-6.
- Kendall, Elisabeth (2002). "Between Politics and Literature: Journals in Alexandria and Istanbul at the End of the Nineteenth Century". In Fawaz, Leila Tarazi; C. A. Bayly (eds.). Modernity and Culture: From the Mediterranean to the Indian Ocean. Columbia University Press. pp. 330-. ISBN 9780231114271. - Also credited: Robert Ilbert (collaboration). Old ISBN 0231114273.
- Masters, Bruce Alan; Ágoston, Gábor (2009). Encyclopedia of the Ottoman Empire. New York: Infobase Publishing. ISBN 978-1-4381-1025-7.
- Morris, Ian (October 2010). Social Development (PDF). Stanford, Calif.: Stanford University. Archived from the original (PDF) on 15 September 2012.
- Rôzen, Mînnā (2002). A History of the Jewish Community in Istanbul: The Formative Years, 1453–1566 (illustrated ed.). Leiden, the Neth.: BRILL. ISBN 978-90-04-12530-8.
- Schmitt, Oliver Jens (2005). Levantiner: Lebenswelten und Identitäten einer ethnokonfessionellen Gruppe im osmanischen Reich im "langen 19. Jahrhundert" (in German). Munich: Oldenbourg. ISBN 978-3-486-57713-6.
- Strauss, Johann (2010). "A Constitution for a Multilingual Empire: Translations of the Kanun-ı Esasi and Other Official Texts into Minority Languages". In Herzog, Christoph; Malek Sharif (eds.). The First Ottoman Experiment in Democracy. Wurzburg. pp. 21–51. (info page on book at Martin Luther University)
- Turan, Neyran (2010). "Towards an Ecological Urbanism for Istanbul". In Sorensen, André; Okata, Junichiro (eds.). Megacities: Urban Form, Governance, and Sustainability. Library for Sustainable Urban Regeneration. London & New York: Springer. pp. 223–42. ISBN 978-4-431-99266-0.
- Wedel, Heidi (2000). Ibrahim, Ferhad; Gürbey, Gülistan (eds.). The Kurdish Conflict in Turkey. Berlin: LIT Verlag Münster. pp. 181–93. ISBN 978-3-8258-4744-9.
