= Al-Shidyaq =

Al-Shidyaq (Arabic: الشدياق) is a surname. Notable people with the surname include:

- Ahmad Faris al-Shidyaq (1805/06–1887), Ottoman linguist, writer, journalist, and translator, brother of As'ad
- As'ad al-Shidyaq (1798–1830), Lebanese missionary
- Tannus al-Shidyaq (c. 1794–1861), Maronite clerk
