= Ibram =

Ibram is both a masculine given name and a surname. Notable people with the name include:

== Given name ==
- Ibram X. Kendi (born 1982), American author, professor, anti-racist activist, and historian
- Ibram Lassaw (1913–2003), Russian-American sculptor

== Surname ==
- Iusein Ibram (1953–2025), Romanian politician

== Fiction ==
- Ibram Gaunt, protagonist in Gaunt's Ghosts
