= Democratic Turkish Union of Romania =

Democratic Turkish Union of Romania Uniunea Democrată Turcă din România Romanya Demokrat Türk Birliği
- Leader: Osman Fedbi
- Founded: 1 February 1990
- Headquarters: 44 Crișana Street, 900573 Constanța
- Ideology: Turkish minority politics
- National affiliation: National Minorities Parliamentary Group
- Chamber of Deputies: 1 / 329
- Senate: 0 / 136
- European Parliament: 0 / 32

Website
- www.rdtb.ro

The Democratic Turkish Union of Romania (Romanian: Uniunea Democrată Turcă din România, UDTR; Turkish: Romanya Demokrat Türk Birliği, RDTB) is an ethnic minority political party in Romania representing the Turkish community.

== History ==
The party was created in 1990 as a split from the Turkish Muslim Democratic Union of Romania (which subsequently became an organisation solely for Romanian Tatars), and was initially named the Ethnic Turkish Minority Union of Romania (Uniunea Minoritară Etnică Turcă din România, UMETR). In the 1992 general elections the party received only 2,572 votes (0.02%), but won a single seat in the Chamber of Deputies under the electoral law that allows for political parties representing ethnic minority groups to be exempt from the electoral threshold. In December 1993 it adopted its current name, and has won a seat in every election since, including in the 2020 general elections, when it received 0.06% of the vote. The party also has representation on Constanța County Council.

== Party logo ==
The logo of the Turkish Democratic Union of Romania is a globe that is the symbol of the Turkish ethnicity (crescent and star), being framed at the bottom by two olive branches, symbolizing peace. At the base of the globe is the name of the Turkish Democratic Union of Romania, framed by the Romanian tricolour, representing the support that the Romanian state gives to the Turkish ethnic group for the preservation of the spiritual-cultural-religious identity.

== Policies ==
The main objective of the party is to protect and promote the ethno-cultural, linguistic, and religious identity of its members:

- Protection of ethnic identity, mainly language, literature, music, religion, traditions, and material values.
- The protection of their own settlements and cultural places.
- Maintenance of historical and architectural vestiges and monuments that mirror the past and sustainability.
- Free expression of Islamic religious faith.
- Developing a social protection system and development of social assistance programs of its members.
- Cultivation and development of traditional Romanian-Turkish friendship relationships.
- Promoting the image of the Turks with Romanian citizenship abroad.

== Election results ==
Election	Chamber of Deputies				Senate		
Election	Votes	%	Seats	Elected member	Votes	%	Seats
1990	–	–	1	Hogea Amat	–	–	–
1992	2,572	0.02	1	Ruşid Fevzie			
1996	4,326	0.04	1	Osman Fedbi	–	–	–
2000	6,675	0.05	1	Metin Cerchez	–	–	–
2004	7,715	0.08	1	Iusein Ibram			
2008	9,481	0.13	1	Iusein Ibram	–	–	–
2012	7,324	0.10	1	Iusein Ibram	–	–	–
2016	5,536	0.08	1	Iusein Ibram	–	–	–
2020	3,540	0.06	1	Iusein Ibram	–	–	–

== Party presidents ==
Term	President
1990–1991	Sheriff Ziadin
1991–1994	Talip Revan
1994–1997	Fedbi Osman
1997–2001	Balgi Ruhan
2001	Asan Murat
2001	Iusein Ibram
2001–2004	Ibram Nuredin
2004–	Fedbi Osman
