= Turks in Romania =

Ethnic group in Romania

Turks of Romania
Total population
- 27,698 (2011 census) est. 55,000 to 80,000

Regions with significant populations
- Northern Dobruja: (Constanța; Tulcea; Bucharest)

Languages
- Turkish; Romanian

Religion
- Islam

Related ethnic groups
- Gagauz, Dobrujan Arabs, Dobrujan Tatars, other Turks

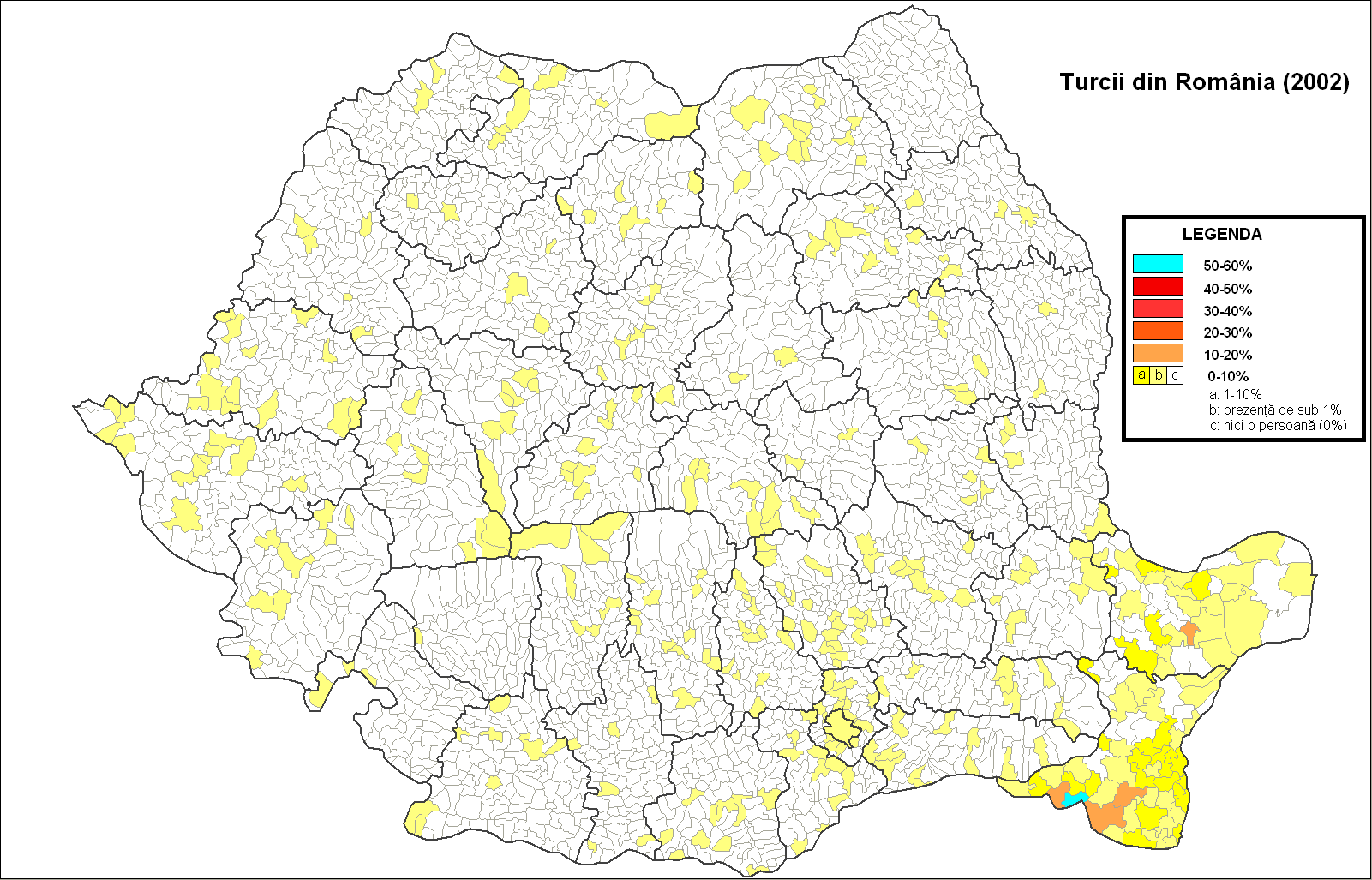
Distribution of Turks in Romania (2002 census)

The Turks of Romania (Turkish: Romanya Türkleri, Romanian: Turcii din România) are ethnic Turks who form an ethnic minority in Romania. According to the 2011 census, there were 27,698 Turks living in the country, forming a minority of some 0.15% of the population. Of these, 81.1% were recorded in the Dobruja region of the country's southeast, near the Black Sea, in the counties of Constanța (21,014) and Tulcea (1,891), with a further 8.5% residing in the national capital Bucharest (2,388).

== History ==
Turkic settlement has a long history in the Dobruja region, various groups such as Bulgars, Pechenegs, Cumans and Turkmen settling in the region between the 7th and 13th centuries, and probably contributing to the formation of a Christian autonomous polity in the 14th century.

The existence of a strictly Turkish population in the territories of modern Romania can possibly be tracked down to the 13th century. In 1243, the Seljuk Turks in Anatolia (most of modern Turkey) were defeated by the Mongols in the Battle of Kösedağ. The Mongols subordinated the Seljuk Turks and divided their lands between two brothers, Kilij Arslan IV and Kaykaus II. Kaykaus II, having been forced to obey his brother, opposed this, for which he had to leave Anatolia together with a large group of partisans and look for refuge in the Byzantine Empire. He and his partisans were settled by Byzantine Emperor Michael VIII Palaiologos in a region between Varna and the Danube Delta which is known as Dobruja today. Later, Kaykaus II would attempt an unsuccessful rebellion in the Byzantine Empire and went into exile in Crimea, but his partisans remained in Dobruja and he would be succeeded as leader by Sarı Saltık. In 1307, some of the Dobrujan Seljuk Turks would return to Anatolia. Nevertheless, some would stay in the area, and while they kept their language, they would convert to Christianity. It has been suggested that these Seljuk Turks eventually evolved into the modern Gagauz people, the name of which would supposedly come from Kaykaus II.

Another important event in the history of the Turkish population in Romania was the Ottoman conquest of the region in the early 15th century. Hence, by the 17th century most of the settlements in Dobruja had Turkish names, either due to colonisations or through assimilation of the Islamised pre-Ottoman Turkic populations. In the nineteenth century, Turks and Tatars were more numerous in Dobruja than the Romanians.

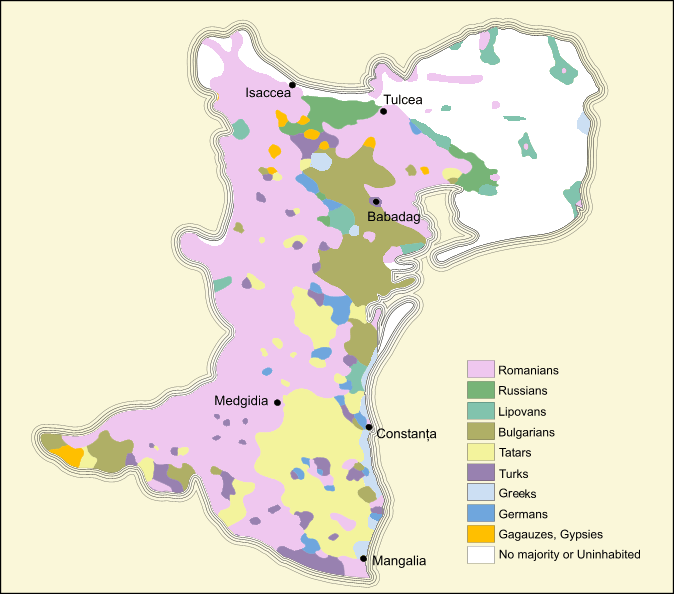
Turks (dark purple) in Northern Dobruja (1903)

Demographic history in Northern Dobruja
Ethnicity	1880	1899	1913	1930^{1}	1956	1966	1977	1992	2002	2011
All	139,671	258,242	380,430	437,131	593,659	702,461	863,348	1,019,766	971,643	897,165
Romanian	43,671 (31%)	118,919 (46%)	216,425 (56.8%)	282,844 (64.7%)	514,331 (86.6%)	622,996 (88.7%)	784,934 (90.9%)	926,608 (90.8%)	883,620 (90.9%)	751,250 (83.7%)
Bulgarian	24,915 (17%)	38,439 (14%)	51,149 (13.4%)	42,070 (9.6%)	749 (0.13%)	524 (0.07%)	415 (0.05%)	311 (0.03%)	135 (0.01%)	58 (0.01%)
Turkish	18,624 (13%)	12,146 (4%)	20,092 (5.3%)	21,748 (5%)	11,994 (2%)	16,209 (2.3%)	21,666 (2.5%)	27,685 (2.7%)	27,580 (2.8%)	22,500 (2.5%)
Tatar	29,476 (21%)	28,670 (11%)	21,350 (5.6%)	15,546 (3.6%)	20,239 (3.4%)	21,939 (3.1%)	22,875 (2.65%)	24,185 (2.4%)	23,409 (2.4%)	19,720 (2.2%)
Russian-Lipovan	8,250 (6%)	12,801 (5%)	35,859 (9.4%)	26,210 (6%)²	29,944 (5%)	30,509 (4.35%)	24,098 (2.8%)	26,154 (2.6%)	21,623 (2.2%)	13,910 (1.6%)
Ruthenian (Ukrainian from 1956)	455 (0.3%)	13,680 (5%)	35,859 (9.4%)	33 (0.01%)	7,025 (1.18%)	5,154 (0.73%)	2,639 (0.3%)	4,101 (0.4%)	1,465 (0.1%)	1,177 (0.1%)
Dobrujan Germans	2,461 (1.7%)	8,566 (3%)	7,697 (2%)	12,023 (2.75%)	735 (0.12%)	599 (0.09%)	648 (0.08%)	677 (0.07%)	398 (0.04%)	166 (0.02%)
Greek	4,015 (2.8%)	8,445 (3%)	9,999 (2.6%)	7,743 (1.8%)	1,399 (0.24%)	908 (0.13%)	635 (0.07%)	1,230 (0.12%)	2,270 (0.23%)	1,447 (0.16%)
Roma	702 (0.5%)	2,252 (0.87%)	3,263 (0.9%)	3,831 (0.88%)	1,176 (0.2%)	378 (0.05%)	2,565 (0.3%)	5,983 (0.59%)	8,295 (0.85%)	11,977 (1.3%)

== Demographics ==
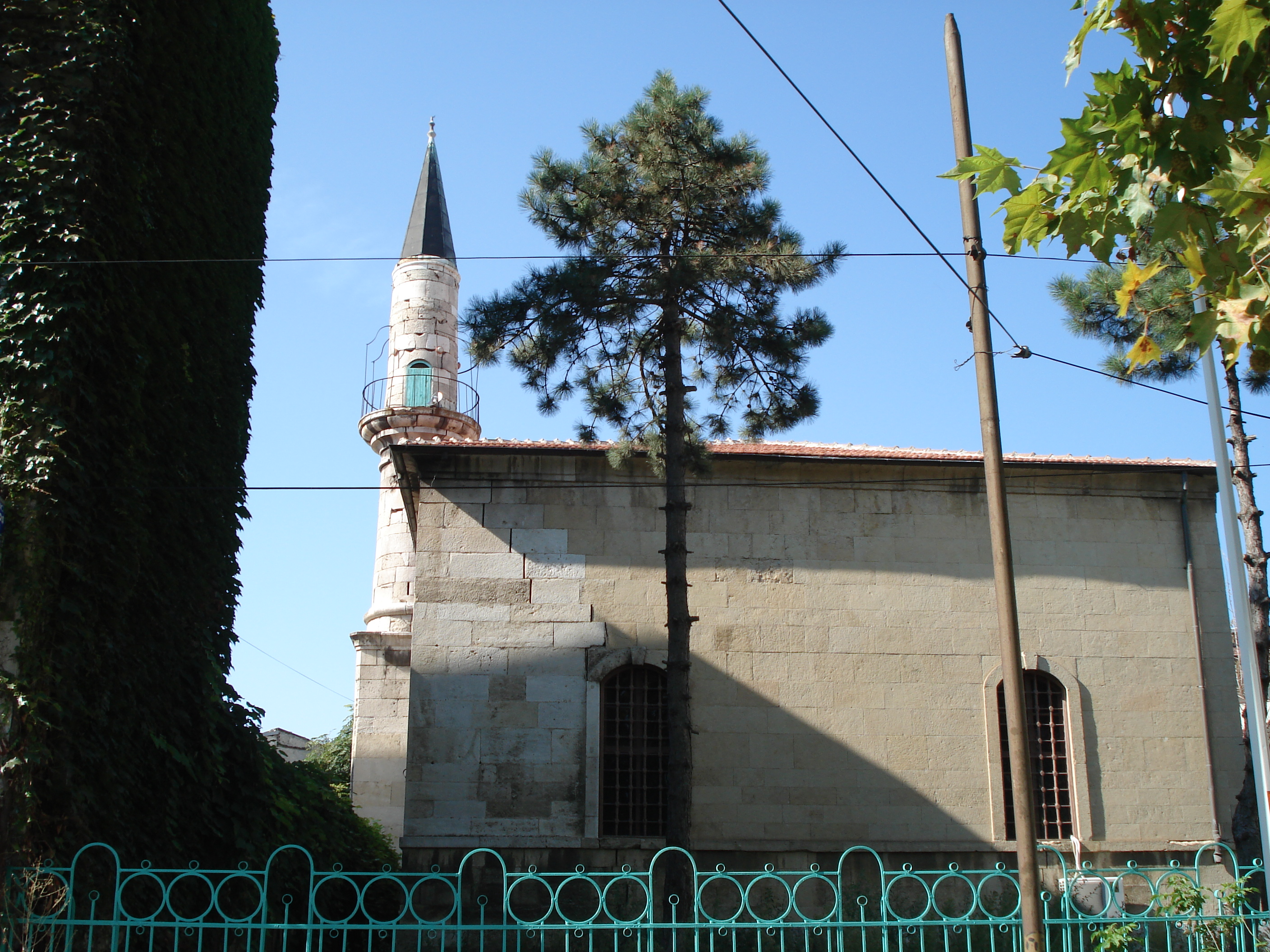
Hunchiar Mosque in Constanța, completed in 1869 by Abdulaziz

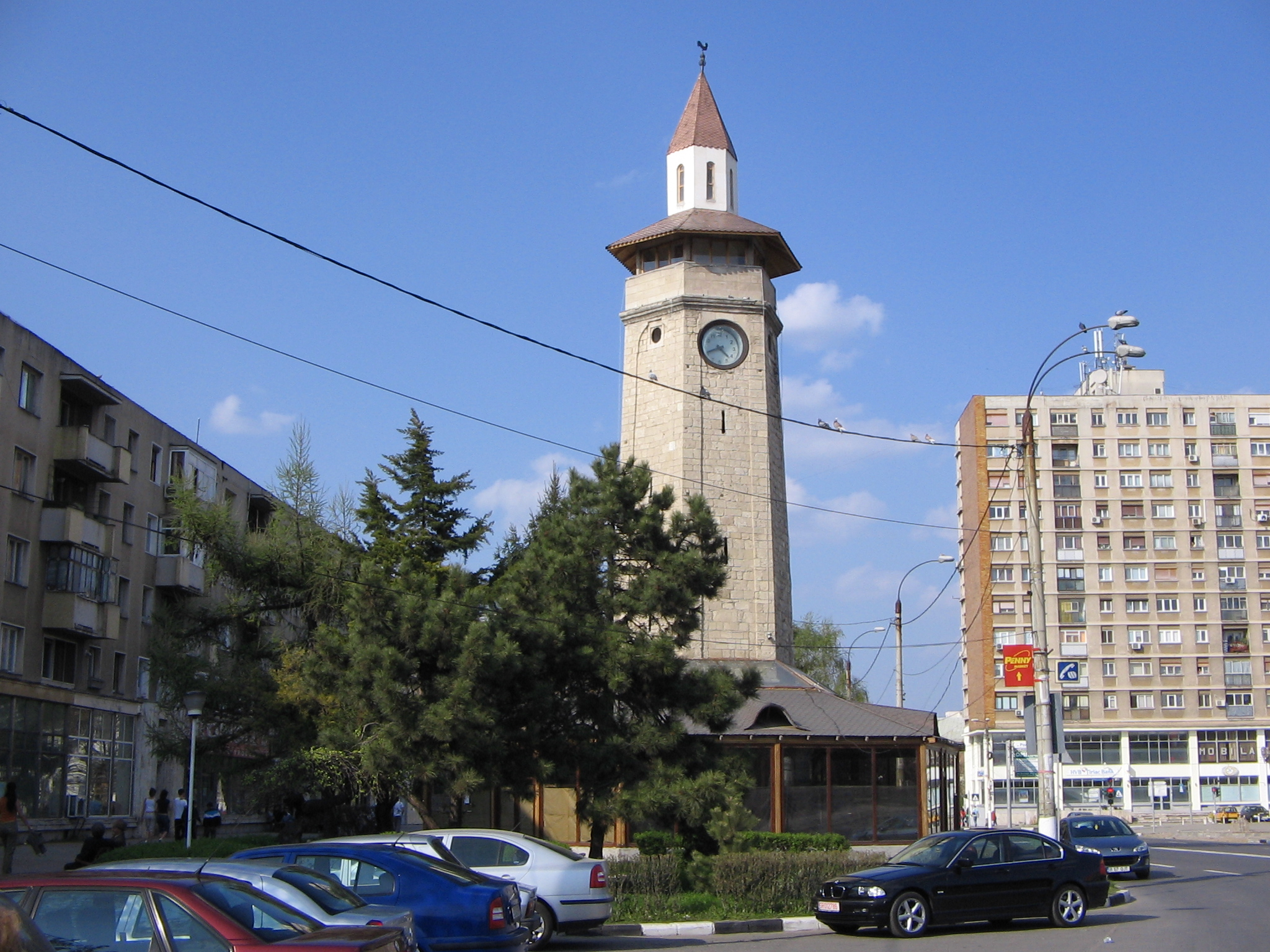
Ottoman clock tower in Giurgiu

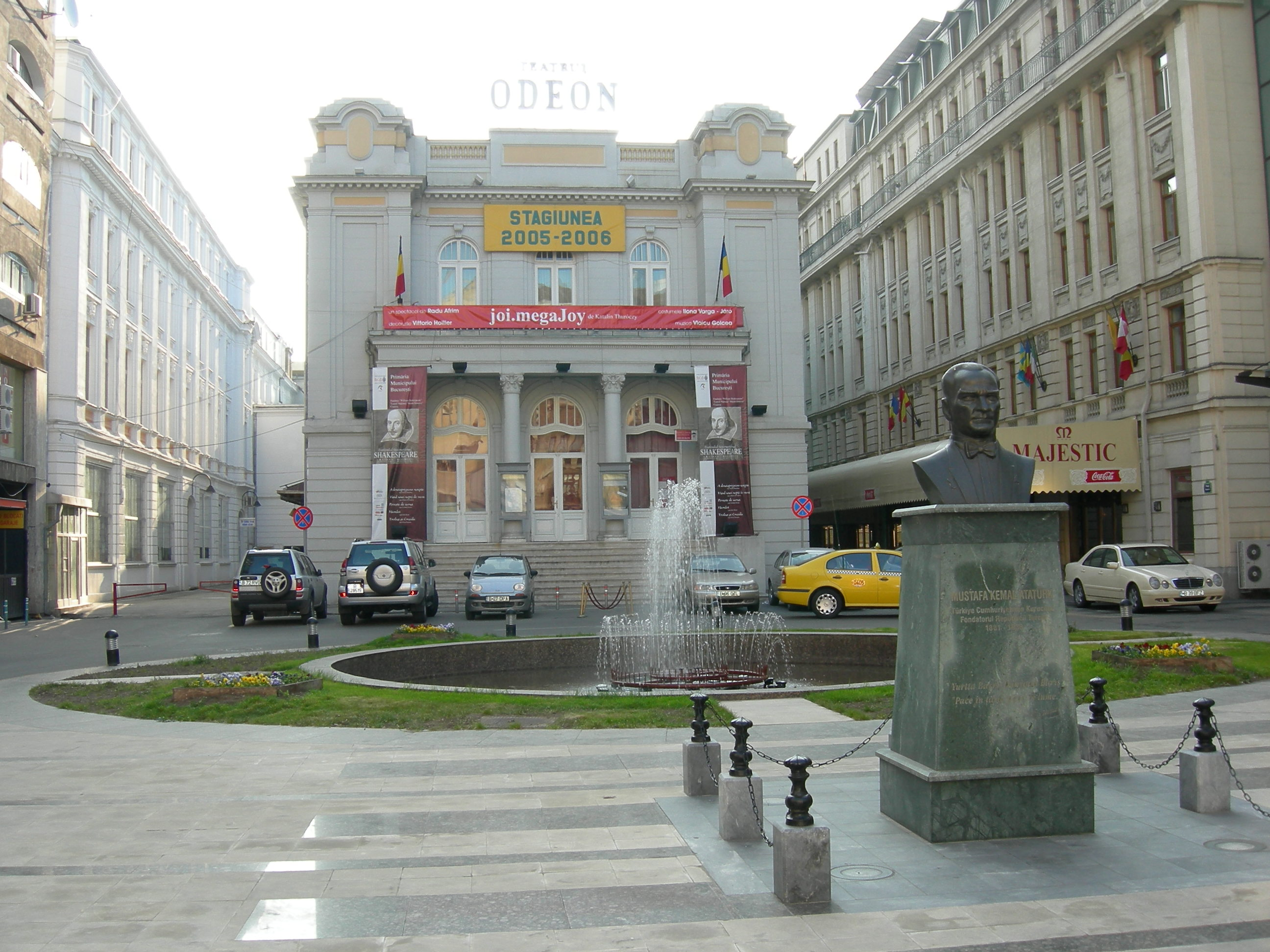
Statue of Mustafa Kemal Atatürk, Calea Victoriei, Bucharest

The majority of Turks live in the historical region of Northern Dobruja (Turkish: Dobruca), particularly in Constanța County, where they number 21,014 and make up 3.3% of the population, Tulcea County with 1,891 (0.94%) and Bucharest with 2,388 (0.14%). Dobromir, a commune in Constanța County, is the only one in Romania with a Turkish majority (61.93%). As an officially recognised ethnic minority, Turks have one seat reserved for them in the Romanian Chamber of Deputies, which has been held by the Democratic Turkish Union of Romania since 1992. An important Turkish community also used to live until 1967 on the island of Ada Kaleh.

After 1989, a significant number of Turkish entrepreneurs started investing and establishing business ventures in Romania, and a certain proportion chose to take up residence in Romania. Unofficial sources estimate there are 12 thousand Turkish citizens in Bucharest.

=== Religion ===
The Romanian Census of 2011 counted 27,698 ethnic Turks, of which 26,903 were Muslims (or 97.1 percent). Around 505 Turks were Orthodox (1.8 percent), while 147 Turks (0.5 percent) belonged to other religions.

== Diaspora ==
Traditionally, large scale Turkish Romanian migration has been to the Republic of Turkey where most arrived as muhacirs ("refugees") during the First World War and the Second World War.

Furthermore, during the early 20th century, some Turkish Romanians also migrated to North America. According to Dr Eleanor Bujea, the early history of Turkish Romanians in Canada began in the 1910s and is similar to that of Jewish Romanians. Many initially homesteaded and raised their families on farms whilst some went into the grocery businesses or opened street carts. However, after the First World War, many of these people moved to large cities where some intermarried and assimilated.

In more recent years, since Romania's admission into the European Union, the Turkish minority in Romania has decreased significantly due to the relaxation of travelling and migration regulations. Thus, since the first decade of the 2000s, Turkish Romanians have joined other Romanian citizens (e.g. ethnic Romanians, Tatars, etc.) in migrating mostly to Germany, Austria, Italy, Spain and the United Kingdom.

== Notable people ==
- Kazak Abdal, Ottoman poet
- Veliyullah Akbaşlı, Turkish politician
- Nejla Ateş, Turkish belly dancer
- Mehmet Rüştü Bekit, Turkish politician
- Aylin Cadîr, actress and singer
- Marcu Cercel, adventurer who served as Prince of Moldavia in July–September 1600 (Turkish mother)
- Hamdi Cerchez, actor
- Metin Cerchez, Member of the Chamber of Deputies (2000–04)
- Ömer Cerrahoğlu, gold medal winner of the International Mathematical Olympiad
- İbrahim Hilmi Çığıraçan, one of the first Turkish publishers in Turkey
- Basri Dirimlili, football player
- Ludmilla Dudarova, actress
- Elena Farago, poet (maternally of Turkish, Greek and Romanian origin)
- Iusein Ibram, Member of the Chamber of Deputies (2004–20)
- Kemal Karpat, Turkish historian
- Fedbi Osman, President of Democratic Turkish Union of Romania (1994–97, 2004–present); Member of the Chamber of Deputies (1996-2000), County Councilor of Constanța (2004–2016); Director of Hakses ("The Voice of Hope")
- Negiat Sali, Member of the Chamber of Deputies (2000–04)
- Enes Sali, Turkish Romanian footballer
- Rıza Saltuğ, Turkish politician
- Sevil Shhaideh, economist, civil servant and politician (Turkish father and Crimean Tatar mother)
- Numan Ustalar, Turkish politician

== See also ==
- Turkish minorities in the former Ottoman Empire
  - Turks in the Balkans
  - Turks in Europe
- Ada Kaleh
- Tatars of Romania
- Islam in Romania
- Romania–Turkey relations
- Romanians in Turkey
- Gagauz people

== Bibliography ==
- Boia, Lucian (2001), History and Myth in Romanian Consciousness, Budapest: Central European University Press, ISBN 963-9116-96-3
- Brozba, Gabriela (2010), Between Reality and Myth: A Corpus-based Analysis of the Stereotypic Image of Some Romanian Ethnic Minorities, GRIN Verlag, ISBN 978-3-640-70386-9.
- Constantin, Daniela L.; Goschin, Zizi; Dragusin, Mariana (2008), "Ethnic entrepreneurship as an integration factor in civil society and a gate to religious tolerance. A spotlight on Turkish entrepreneurs in Romania", Journal for the Study of Religions and Ideologies, 7 (20): 28–41
- National Institute of Statistics (2002), Population by ethnic groups, regions, counties and areas (PDF), Romania - National Institute of Statistics
- National Institute of Statistics (2011), Comunicat de presă privind rezultatele provizorii ale Recensământului Populaţiei şi Locuinţelor – 2011 (PDF), Romania-National Institute of Statistics, archived from the original (PDF) on 2019-08-02
- Phinnemore, David (2006), The EU and Romania: Accession and Beyond, The Federal Trust for Education & Research, ISBN 1-903403-78-2
