= As'ad al-Shidyaq =

Lebanese cleric and preacher (1798–1830)

As'ad al-Shidyaq (1798–1830) was a Lebanese Protestant Christian cleric and preacher. He was the elder brother of Ahmad Faris al-Shidyaq.

Originally a Maronite seminary student, Al-Shidyaq was the first Levantine convert to Protestantism as a result of American missionary efforts in the region. Around 1820, As'ad al-Shidyaq encountered Jonas King, a Protestant missionary of the American Board of Commissioners for Foreign Missions; eventually As'ad became Protestant. He was excommunicated under the automatic excommunication edict issued by the Maronite Patriarch Youssef Hobaish (1823–1845), who sought to prevent all dealings with the Protestant missionaries. As'ad was later detained for years in the Monastery of Qannoubine in the Qadisha valley, where he died in 1830.
