= Al Jawaib =

Newspaper in Ottoman Empire (1861–1884)

- Type: Weekly newspaper
- Founder(s): Ahmad Faris al-Shidyaq
- Publisher: Ottoman Imperial Press (1861–1870); Jawaib Press (from 1870)
- Founded: 1861
- Language: Arabic
- Ceased publication: 1884
- Headquarters: Constantinople (1861–1883); Cairo (1883–1884)
- Country: Ottoman Empire

Al Jawaib (Arabic: الجوائب al-Jawāʾib, "The News") was a newspaper which existed from 1861 to 1884. The paper was founded by Ahmad Faris al-Shidyaq, a Lebanese journalist, and headquartered in Constantinople, Ottoman Empire. Over time it became the most popular Arabic publication in the Empire and made its founder known as a respected journalist and writer. In the last year of its existence the paper was published in Cairo.

== History and profile ==
Al Jawaib was launched by Ahmad Faris al-Shidyaq in Istanbul in 1861. He owned the paper until 1870 when his son Salim took over it. During the initial period it was subsidized by the Ottoman authorities. In addition, it was published at the imperial press for nine years which was announced in the paper. From 1870 the paper was published by the company named after it, Jawaib Press, which was also established by al-Shidyaq. The paper came out weekly. It frequently published the Arabic translations of the official Ottoman legislation, international treaties, and speeches along with their original Ottoman Turkish texts.

In the mid-1870s Al Jawaib enjoyed higher levels of circulation in various places, including India and East Asia. For instance, British historian Albert Hourani argues that it was possible to find the paper in different Muslim regions such as Nejd, Arabia, and Bombay, India. As a result of its significant influence on Muslims, the British Foreign Office covertly financed Al Jawaib from 1877.

Al Jawaib temporarily ceased publication in 1879 when the Ottomans banned it due to its praise for the Egyptian Khedive, Isma'il Pasha, who was among its financiers. The paper was moved to Cairo in 1883. It was closed down by the Ottoman government in 1884 due to its extreme pro-British stance which had been evident since the 1881 rebellion against the Empire in Sudan.
