= Romanians in Turkey =

Total population
- 14.000 (Istanbul-only)

Regions with significant populations
- Istanbul; Ankara; Antalya; İzmir

Languages
- Romanian; Turkish

Religion
- Romanian Orthodoxy; Sunni Islam

Related ethnic groups
- Bulgarians in Turkey, Serbs in Turkey

Romanians in Turkey includes Turkish citizens of Romanian origin (including Turkish-Romanian origin), as well as Romanian citizens resident in Turkey.

Romanians are generally concentrated in the major cities in Turkey, especially Istanbul, where 14,000 Romanians reside and where there is also a Romanian Orthodox Church.

== History ==
Romanians have migrated to the modern-day territory of Turkey since the Ottoman times. During the Ottoman period, in the areas of modern-day Romania where the Ottoman army made incursions, Romanian male children were taken from their homes through the devşirme and made to serve as Janissaries. Also during the Ottoman period, an important Romanian colony was established in Constantinople (then capital of the Ottoman Empire, modern-day Istanbul). A Romanian Orthodox Church was built there by the Wallachian ruler Constantin Brâncoveanu, which even today is an important center of the local Romanian community.

After Romanian won its independence from the Ottoman Empire, An estimated 400,000 Dobrujan Turks started to emigrate to modern-day Turkey.

During the communist rule of Romania, another wave of Romanian Turks, as well as Romanian Tatars and ethnic Romanians emigrated to Turkey. After the Romanian revolution, a significant number of Romanian entrepreneurs started investing and establishing business ventures in Turkey, and a certain proportion chose to take up residence there (especially in Istanbul). There are also Romanian migrant workers, as well as students and artists living in Turkey. During this period, many Romanians intermarried and assimilated with locals, bringing a rapid increase in mixed marriages.

== Notable people ==
- Kazak Abdal, poet
- Veliyullah Akbaşlı, politician
- Nejla Ateş, belly dancer
- Mehmet Rüştü Bekit, politician
- İbrahim Hilmi Çığıraçan, one of the first Turkish publishers in Turkey
- Basri Dirimlili, football player
- Rıza Saltuğ, Turkish politician
- Numan Ustalar, politician
- Kemal Karpat, historian and academic
- Osman Ağa of Temeşvar, Ottoman military figure
- Receb Ağa, Ottoman general
- Mirela Dulgheru, long jumper
- Ianis Hagi, footballer
- Meral Yıldız Ali, table tennis player
- Emin Bektöre, folklorist
- Eren Eyüboğlu, painter
- Racoviță family
- Alexandros Kallimachis, statesman
- Pertevniyal Sultan, thirteenth consort of Sultan Mahmud II
- Barbu Iscovescu, revolutionary
- Bujor Hoinic, conductor

== See also ==
- Romania–Turkey relations
- Romanian diaspora
- Immigration to Turkey
- Turks of Romania
