= Ahmad Faris al-Shidyaq =

Linguist, writer, journalist, translator

- أحمد فارس الشدياق
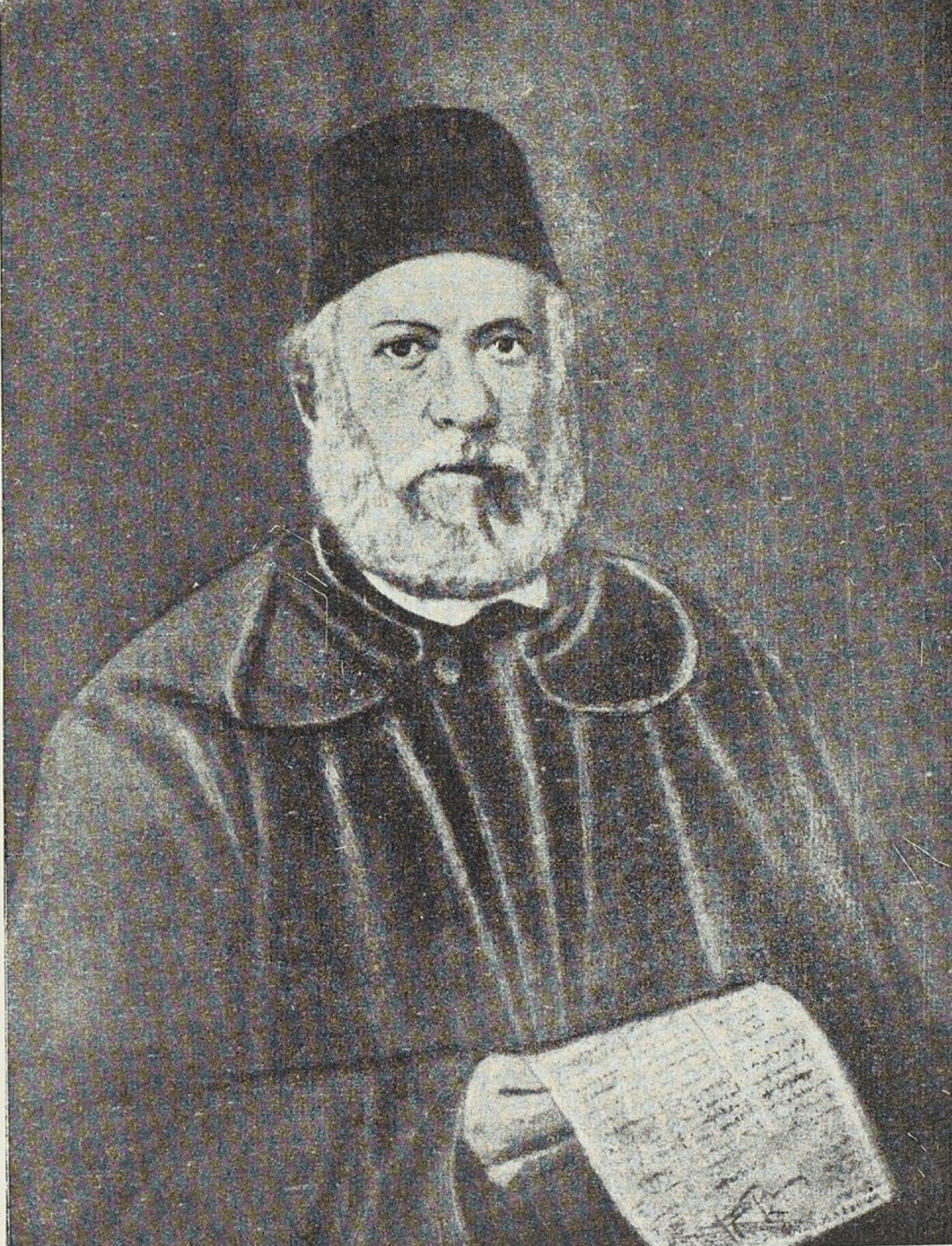
- Born: Faris ibn Yusuf al-Shidyaq; 1805 or 1806; Ashqout, Mount Lebanon Emirate, Ottoman Empire
- Died: 20 September 1887; Kadıköy, Istanbul Vilayet, Ottoman Empire
- Occupations: Linguist, writer, journalist, translator
- Spouses: Marie As-Souly; Safia Ahmed Faris
- Children: Salim (1836–1910), Fayiz (1828–1856),
- Parent(s): Youssef Ash-Shidyaq, Marie Massaad

Ahmad Faris al-Shidyaq (Note: Also known as Ahmad Farès al-Chidiac.) (Arabic: أحمد فارس الشدياق, ALA-LC: Aḥmad Fāris al-Shidyāq; born Faris ibn Yusuf al-Shidyaq; 1805 or 1806 – 20 September 1887) was an Ottoman scholar, writer and journalist who grew up in what is now present-day Lebanon. A Maronite Christian by birth, he later lived in major cities of the Arabic-speaking world, where he had his career. He converted to Protestantism during the nearly two decades that he lived and worked in Cairo, present-day Egypt, from 1825 to 1848. He also spent time on the island of Malta. In 1857, with Evangelist American missionaries, he participated in the publishing of a novel Protestant Arabic translation of the Bible in Great Britain where Faris lived and worked for 7 years, becoming a British citizen. He next moved to Paris, France, for two years in the early 1850s, where he wrote and published some of his most important work.

Later in the 1850s Faris moved to Tunisia, where in 1860 he converted to Islam, taking the first name Ahmad. Moving to Istanbul later that year to work as a translator at the request of the Ottoman government, Faris also founded an Arabic-language newspaper. It was supported by the Ottomans, Egypt and Tunisia, publishing until the late 1880s.

Faris continued to promote Arabic language and culture, resisting the 19th-century "Turkization" pushed by the Ottomans based in present-day Turkey. Shidyaq is considered to be one of the founding fathers of modern Arabic literature; he wrote most of his fiction in his younger years.

== Biography ==
Mystery shrouds the life of Ahmad Faris Shidyaq. While he has numerous autobiographical references in his writings, scholars have found it difficult to distinguish between romanticizing and reality.

=== Early life ===
Faris Shidyaq was born in 1804 in Ashqout, a mountain village of the Keserwan District in the modern Mount Lebanon Governorate. At birth, his given name was Faris, (the name Ahmad was added by him after his conversion to Islam in the 1860). His father's name was Youssef. His mother was of the Massaad family, from Ashqout. His family traced its roots to ancient Syria, and was very well educated. Its members worked as secretaries for the governors of Mount Lebanon. In 1805, the family was forced to leave Ashqout following a conflict with a local governor; Butrus al-Shidyaq, the paternal grandfather of Faris, was killed because of the politics.

The family settled in Hadath, in the suburbs of Beirut, at the service of a Shihabi prince. Faris joined his brothers, Tannous (1791–1861) and As'ad (1798–1830), and his maternal cousin Boulos Massaad (1806–1890), in Ayn Warqa school, one of the most prestigious Maronite schools of the 19th century. Again, a family conflict, in which the Shidyaq were at odds with the Prince Bashir Shihab II, obliged their father Youssef Ash-Shidyaq to take refuge in Damascus, where he died in 1820.

Faris left school and continued his studies under his older brothers Assaad and Tannous. He joined his brother Tannous as a copyist at the service of the Prince Haydar Shihab; their brother Assaad worked as the secretary of the Sheikh Ali Al-Emad in Kfarnabrakh, in the Chouf District. His brother Assaad's life had a major influence on the life and career of Faris.

=== Life after leaving Lebanon ===
Around 1820, As'ad al-Shidyaq encountered Jonas King, a Protestant missionary of the American Board of Commissioners for Foreign Missions; eventually As'ad became Protestant. He was excommunicated under the automatic excommunication edict issued by the Maronite Patriarch Youssef Hobaish (1823–1845), who sought to prevent all dealings with the Protestant missionaries. As'ad was later detained for years in the Monastery of Qannoubine in the Qadisha valley, where he died in 1830.

By 1825, Faris had left Lebanon for Egypt, as he was tormented by his brother's ordeals. As'ad's death permanently affected the younger man's choices and his career. He never forgave his brother Tannous and his cousin Boulos Mas'ad (who later became the Maronite Patriarch (1854–1890)) for what he considered their role in the events that led to the death of As'ad.

In 1826, Faris married Marie Al-Souly, daughter of a wealthy Christian family, who were originally from Syria. They had two sons: Faris (1826–1906) and Fayiz (1828–1856). From 1825 to 1848, Faris divided his time in living in Cairo and on the island of Malta. He was the editor-in-chief of an Egyptian newspaper, Al Waqa'eh Al Masriah. In Malta, he was the director of the printing press of American missionaries. He also studied Fiqh in Al-Azhar University in Cairo. Faris is believed to have converted to Protestantism during this period in Egypt, an extended time of relative solitude and study.

In 1848 he was invited to Cambridge, England, by the Orientalist Samuel Lee (1783–1852) to participate in the Arabic translation of the Bible. This translation of the Bible was published in 1857, after the death of Samuel Lee. This translation is still considered one of the best Arabic translations of the Bible.

Faris stayed in England with his family for almost 7 years. He settled first in Barley, Hertfordshire and then moved to Cambridge. At the end of his English stay, he moved to Oxford, where he became naturalized as a British citizen, but tried in vain to secure a teaching post. Disappointed by England and its academics, he moved to Paris, France around 1855.

Faris stayed in Paris till 1857. It was one of his most prolific periods in thinking and writing, but also in having an intense social nightlife. In Paris he wrote and published his major works. It is also in Paris that he was introduced to Socialism and where he became a Socialist. A keen admirer of Shakespeare, Faris argued that Othello suggests a detailed knowledge of Arabic culture. Faris suggested that Shakespeare may have had an Arabic background, his original name being "Shaykh Zubayr". This theory was later developed in all seriousness by Safa Khulusi.

His wife died in 1857. He married an English woman, Safia, who had embraced Islam. They had no children.

Salim Faris, Ahmad Faris's son, followed him to England and Paris and became the Consul of Turkey in Paris. Salim lived a period in London 1877 had one daughter 1878: Rosalinde Faris (mother unknown).

Ahmad Faris and Safia moved to Tunisia, at the invitation to Faris by the Bey of Tunis. He was appointed as editor-in-chief of the newspaper Al Ra'ed, and supervisor of the Education Directorate. In 1860 Faris converted from the Congregational church to Islam and took the name Ahmad. He soon afterwards left Tunis for Istanbul, Turkey, being invited by the Ottoman Sultan Abdel Majid I.

Ahmad Faris spent the last part of his life in Istanbul where, in addition to his position as an official translator, he founded in 1861 an Arabic newspaper Al Jawaib. It was supported financially by the Ottomans, as well as by the Egyptian and Tunisian rulers. It was modeled on the modern Western newspapers and continued publication until 1884.

Ahmad Faris strongly defended use of the Arabic language and its heritage and Arabic culture against the Turkization attempts of the Turkish reformers of the 19th century. He is considered one of the founding fathers of modern Arabic literature and journalism.

=== Death and afterward ===
Ahmad Faris Shidyaq died on 20 September 1887 in Kadikoy, Turkey. He was buried in Lebanon on 5 October 1887. Many of his works remain unpublished and some manuscripts are lost.

== Philosophical and/or political views ==
Since 2001, scholars have published about his life, thought and unpublished works. Shidyaq's major works were dedicated to the modernization of the Arabic language, the promotion of the Arab culture in opposition to the turkization movement of the 19th century Ottoman Empire, and the modernization of the Arab societies.

Among the publication of his fictional works, in 2014, New York University Press published Humphrey Davies's English translation of Saq 'ala al-saq as Leg over Leg. This lengthy, digressive novel can be seen as in the tradition of Sterne's Tristram Shandy.

== Works ==
=== Published works ===
- Jubrān, S., & A. F. Shidyāq(1991). Kitāb al-Fāriyāq: mabnāhu wa-uslūbuhu wa-sukhriyatuh. Dirāsāt wa-nuṣūṣ adabīyah, 6. Tel Aviv: Jāmiʻat Tall Abīb – University of Tel Aviv. OCLC 40126655
- Shidyāq, A. F., Ṭarābulsī, F., & ʻAẓmah, ʻA. (1995). Aḥmad Fāris Shidyāq. Silsilat al-aʻmāl al-majhūlah. London: Riyad El-Rayyes. ISBN 978-1-85513-288-7 OCLC 34773377
- Shidyāq, A. F., & Ṣulḥ, ʻI. (1982). Iʻtirāfāt al-Shidyāq fī kitāb al-Sāq ʻalá al-sāq. Bayrūt, Lubnān: Dār al-Rāʼid al-ʻArabī. OCLC 15721715
- Shidyaq, A. F., & Sawaie, Mohammed (1998). "Ahmad Faris al-Shidyaq wa al-Muṣṭalaḥ al-Lughawi. (Ahmad Faris al-Shidyaq and the Coining of Arabic Terminology)). (In Arabic).". Majallat Majma' al-Lugha al-'Arabiyya bi Dimashq (Arabic Language Academy, Damascus), Vo173 (1): 89-100.
- Shidyaq, A. F., & Mohammed, Sawaie (2002). "Nazra fi mawqif Ahmad Faris al-Shidyaq min Taṭwīr al-Ma'ājim al-'Arabiyya (An Examination of Ahmad Faris al-Shidyaq's Views on Arabic Dictionaries). (In Arabic). In Bulletin d'Etudes Orientales, LIII-LIV: 515-538.". Bulletins des Etudes Orientales.
- Shidyaq, A. F., & Sawaie, Mohammed (2003). "Ahmad Faris al-Shidyaq wa ‘Arā’uhu fī Ba'ḍ al-Mustashriqīn fi al-'Arabiyya wa Mashākil al-Tarjama (Ahmad Faris al-Shidyaq and his Views in Some Orientalists and Problems of Translation).". Majallat Majmac al-Lugha al-cArabiyya bi Dimashq (Arabic Language Academy) Damascus, 2003, volume 78, no. 1.
- Shidyaq, A. F., & Sawaie, Mohammed (2013). Al-Ḥadātha wa Muṣṭalḥāt al-Nahḍa al-'Arabiyya fī al-Qarn al-Tāsi' 'Ashar “Modernity and Nineteenth Century Arabic Lexicography: A Case Study of Ahmad Faris al-Shidyaq” (in Arabic). Beirut: al-Mu’assassa al-Arabiyya li al-Dirasat wa al-Nashr.
- Shidyāq, A. F., & Sawaie, M. (2004). Rasā'il Aḥmad Fāris al-Shidyāq al-maḥfūẓah fī al-Arshīf al-Waṭanī al-Tūnisī. Beirut: al-Muʼassasah al-ʻArabīyah lil-Dirāsāt wa-al-Nashr. OCLC 58390478
- Shidyāq, A. F., & Maṭwī, M. a.-H. (2006). Sirr al-layāl fī al-qalb wa-al-ibdāl fī ʻilm maʻānī al-alfāẓ al-ʻArabīyah: al-muqaddimah wa-mukhtārāt. Beirut: Dār al-Gharb al-Islāmī. OCLC 68745724
- Shidyāq, A. F., & Williams, H. G. (1866). A practical grammar of the Arabic language: with interlineal reading lessons, dialogues and vocabulary. London: Bernard Quaritch. OCLC 9177725
- Shidyāq, A. F. (1973). al-Jāsūs ʻalá al-Qāmūs. [Beirut]: Dār Ṣādir. OCLC 21417692
- Shidyāq, A. F., & Khāzin, N. W. (1966). al-Sāq ʻalá al-sāq fī mā huwa al-fāryāq: aw Ayyām wa-shuhūr wa-aʻwām fī ʻajam al-ʻArab wa-al-aʻjām. Bayrūt: Dār Maktabat al-Ḥayāh. OCLC 21469257
- Fāris, S., & Shidyāq, A. F. (1871). Kanz al-raghāʼib fī muntakhabāt al-Jawāʼib. [Istanbul]: Maṭbaʻat al-Jawāʼib. OCLC 11426489
- Shidyāq, A. F. (2004). al-Wāsitah fī ma'rifat ahwāl Māltah: wa kasaf al-mukhabbāʼ ʻan funūn Ūrubbā 1834–1857. Irtiyād al-āfāq. Abū Ẓaby: Dār al-Suwaydī. ISBN 978-9953-36-589-3 OCLC 58427690
- Shidyāq, A. F., & ʻAmāyirah, M. A. (2003). Mumāḥakāt al-taʼwīl fī munāqiḍāt al-Injīl. ʻAmmān: Dār Wāʼil lil-Nashr. ISBN 978-9957-11-225-7 OCLC 53814162
- Shidyāq, A. F., Khūrī, Y. Q., & Ībish, Y. (2001). Mukhtarat min āthar Aḥmad Fāris al-Shidyāq. Bayrūt: al-Muʼassasah al-Sharqīyah lil-Nashr. OCLC 47781016
- Shidyāq, A. F., & Shawābikah, M. ʻ. (1991). al-Shidyāq al-nāqid: muqaddimat dīwān Aḥmad Fāris al-Shidyāq. ʻAmmān: Dār al-Bashīr. OCLC 33923343
- Shidyāq, A. F. (1992). Kitāb ghunyat al-ṭālib wa-munyat al-rāghib: durūs fī al-ṣarf wa-al-naḥw wa-ḥurūf al-maʻānī. Sūsah, Tūnis: Dār al-Maʻārif lil-Ṭibāʻat wa-al-Nashr. ISBN 978-9973-16-246-5 OCLC 32313699
- Shidyāq, A. F. (1881). Kitāb al-bākūrah al-shahīyah fī naḥw al-lughah al-Inkilīzīyah. Qusṭanṭīnīyah: Maṭbaʻat al-Jawāʼib. OCLC 11480764
- Shidyāq, A. F. (1983). Kutub al-Muqaddasah, wa-hiya Kutub al-ʻAhd al-ʻAtīq ... wa-Kutub al-ʻAhd al-Jadīd li-Rabbina Yasūʻ al-Masīḥ. Ṭarābulus: Maktabat al-Sāʼiḥ. Society for Promoting Christian Knowledge (Great Britain). OCLC 16653600
- Shidyāq, A. F. (1882). al-Lafīf fī kulli maʻná ṭarīf. Qusṭanṭīnīyah: Maṭbaʻat al-Jawāʼib. OCLC 33994725
- Shidyāq, A. F. (1880). Abdaʻ mā-kān fī ṣuwar Salāṭīn Āl ʻUthmān = Album des souverains ottomans. Constantinople: Maṭbaʻat al-Jawāʼib. OCLC 15623629
- Church of England, & Shidyāq, A. F. (1840). Kitāb al-ṣalawāt al-ʻāmmah wa-ghayrihā min rusūm al-kanīsah. Fālittah: [s.n.]. Malta. OCLC 25349490 Book of Common Prayer of the Church of England
- Shidyāq, A. F., Mavor, W. F., & Damīrī, M. i. M. (1841). Sharḥ ṭabāyiʻ ʼal-ḥayawān. ʼal-Juzʼ 1, Fī dhawāt ʼal-ʼarbaʻ wa-ʼal-ṭayr. Malta. OCLC 85056798
- Shidyāq, A. F. (1858). Iʻlâm; prospectus. Marseille: Impr. orientale d'Arnaud. OCLC 44171466

=== Translations of his works ===
- al-Shidyāq, A. F. (1855). La vie et les aventures de Fariac; relation de ses voyages, avec ses observations critiques sur les arabes et sur les autres peuples. Paris: B. Duprat. OCLC 40975171
- Shidyāq, A. F., & Khawam, R. R. (1991). La jambe sur la jambe: roman. Domaine étranger. Paris: Phébus. OCLC 24627621

== Secondary literature ==
- Abu-'Uksa, Wael (2016). Freedom in the Arab World: Concepts and Ideologies in Arabic Thought in the Nineteenth Century. Cambridge University Press.
- Shidyaq, A. F., & Sawaie, Mohammed (1990). "An Aspect of 19th Century Arabic Lexicography: The modernizing role and contribution of (Ahmad) Faris al-Shidyaq (1804?-1887)". History and Historiography of Linguistics: International Conference on the History of the Language Sciences IV: 157-171, H-J Niederehe and Konrad Koerner (eds.). Amsterdam and Philadelphia: Benjamins Publishers.

== See also ==
- Converts to Islam
