= Iusein Ibram =

Romanian politician (1953–2025)

Member of the Chamber of Deputies
- In office 21 December 2016 – January 2025

Personal details
- Born: 6 July 1953
- Died: 27 January 2025 (aged 71)

Iusein Ibram (6 July 1953 – 27 January 2025) was a Romanian politician who served as a member of the Chamber of Deputies from 2016 until his death in 2025.

== Life and career ==
Ibram was elected in 2016 and re-elected in 2020. He died on 27 January 2025, at the age of 71.
