= Lanurile =

Lanurile may refer to several villages in Romania:

- Lanurile, a village in Viziru Commune, Brăila County
- Lanurile, a village in Ziduri Commune, Buzău County
- Lanurile, a village in Bărăganu Commune, Constanța County
