= Pelinu =

Pelinu may refer to several villages in Romania:

- Pelinu, a village in Dor Mărunt Commune, Călărași County
- Pelinu, a village in Comana Commune, Constanța County
