= Kadriye Nurmambet =

Romanian Crimean Tatar singer and folklorist (1933–2023)

Background information
- Born: Kadriye Nurmambet; 21 August 1933; Bazargic, Dobruja, Kingdom of Romania (now Dobrich, Bulgaria)
- Origin: Medgidia, Constanta, Romania
- Died: 31 January 2023 (aged 89) Bucharest, Romania (buried: Constanța)
- Genres: Traditional folk
- Occupation: Lawyer
- Instrument: Vocals
- Years active: 1950–2023
- Labels: Electrecord

Kadriye Nurmambet (Note: Dobrujan Tatar: Kadriye Nurmambet Crimean Tatar: Qadriye Nurmambet, Къадрие Нурмамбет Romanian: Cadrie Nurmambet) was a Romanian Crimean Tatar traditional folk singer and folklorist who attracted national attention and was known as The Nightingale of Dobruja.

== Biography ==
Nurmambet was born on 21 August 1933 to Pakize and Ahmet Nurmambet in Bazargic, Dobruja, in the Kingdom of Romania (nowadays Dobrich, Bulgaria). Her father was an officer in the 40th Artillery Regiment, Mărăşeşti 9th Division. When Romania ceded Southern Dobruja to Bulgaria, at the beginning of World War II, her family moved north to Medgidia where her father was appointed commander of a garrison.

Nurmambet studied law at the University of Bucharest and graduated in 1957. She was the first female Crimean Tatar lawyer in Romania and she served in the Constanta Bar Association.

Nurmambet had an interest in folklore and folk music as a child and early on joined Crimean Tatar and Romanian folk groups. Her first stage performance was in 1950 at the Romanian Athenaeum, alongside notable folk singers Emil Gavriş, Ştefan Lăzărescu, Lucreția Ciobanu, Maria Lătărețu and pan flute virtuoso Fănică Luca. They performed with the Barbu Lautarul Orchestra, conducted by Ionel Budișteanu and Nicu Stănescu.

In 1954 professor Tiberiu Alexandru at the National University of Music Bucharest praised her performance and debuted her voice on the radio. Her first disc was released in 1960 at Electrecord, followed by other recordings in 1963, 1974, 1980, 1982, and 1989.

Kadriye learned her first folk songs from her mother, but later she developed a strong interest in collecting traditional songs. She used to travel in the villages of Dobruja looking for people carrying out Crimean, Nogai Tatar, and Turkish folk culture. In 1957 she was invited to record over 90 traditional Tatar and Turkish songs for the Golden Sound Archive of the Ethnography and Folklore Institute of Bucharest. Throughout her life she made prominent efforts to preserve the traditional music of the Turks and Tatars of Romania by teaching and counseling their folklore.

In 2009, Nurmambet released a studio album, titled Tatar and Turkish Traditional Folk Songs and recorded by Electrecord.

Nurmambet died on 31 January 2023, at the age of 89.

== See also ==
- Ahmet Nurmambet
- Emin Bektóre
- Refiyîk Kadír
