= Selim Abdulakim =

Romanian Crimean Tatar lawyer and politician (1886–1943)

Selim Abdulakim Selim Abdulachim
- Born: 1886
- Died: 1943 (aged 56–57); Constanța, Kingdom of Romania
- Resting place: Constanța Muslim Central Cemetery; 44.173120°N 28.622248°E
- Occupations: lawyer, politician
- Known for: The first Crimean Tatar lawyer in Romania
- Spouse: Sayide (Saide) Selim (m. 1894)
- Relatives: Kázím Abdulakim (brother); Şefika also known as Sapiye Abdulakim (sister); Memet Niyaziy (brother-in-law)

Selim Abdulakim (also transliterated in Romanian as: Selim Abdulachim; 1886–1943) known as the first Crimean Tatar lawyer in Romania was a leading politician of the Tatars in Romania, an activist for ethnic Tatar causes.

== Biography ==
Selim was born in 1886. He was the brother of Second Lieutenant Kázím Abdulakim, a World War I hero of the Romanian Army who lost his life during the Battle of Mărășești in 1917. Selim's sister Şefika, also known as Sapiye, was the wife of the beloved Crimean Tatar poet Memet Niyaziy. Selim was married to Sayide (also spelled in Romanian as Saide).

From 1911 he studied at the University of Bucharest's Law Faculty. Between the two wars, Selim was president of the Muslim community in Constanța[./Selim_Abdulakim#cite_note-FOOTNOTELascu2013245–246-8 [8]] and Deputy Mayor of Constanța. He was a deputy in the Parliament of Romania, where he defended the rights of the Muslims of Dobruja. He warned that as none of their wishes were taken into account, their emigration is a national threat.

Selim loved to be of help and support for young people. In 1929, he founded Selim Abdulakim Muslim Cultural Fund, a cultural association aimed at helping Muslim students from secondary schools and higher education, which had its office located in Constanța, at the corner of Ferdinand Avenue and Mircea cel Bătrân Street.

Selim died on 28 March 1943 in Constanța. He is resting in Constanța Muslim Central Cemetery at 44.173120°N 28.622248°E. His wife, Sayide (1894–1967), rests in close proximity.

== See also ==
- Kázím Abdulakim
- Memet Niyaziy

== Sources ==
- Agi-Amet, Gemal (1999). Dicționarul personalităților turco-tătare din România (in Romanian). Constanța: Metafora. ISBN 9789739340274.
- Scurtu, Costin (2011). "Comunitatea turco-tãtarã din Dobrogea în armatã". Tara Barsei (in Romanian). 2011 (10): 95.
- Scurtu, Costin (24 September 2013), "Contribuții la păstrarea tradițiilor musulmane dobrogene în armata română", in Tasin Gemil; Gabriel Custurea; Delia Roxana Cornea (eds.), Simpozionul Internațional: Moștenirea culturală turcă în Dobrogea (in Romanian), Constanța: Muzeul de Istorie Națională și Arheologie
- Lascu, Stoica (24 September 2013), "Turco-tătarii dobrogeni în lumina unor mărturii arhivistice constănțene (1885–1948)", in Tasin Gemil; Gabriel Custurea; Delia Roxana Cornea (eds.), Simpozionul Internațional: Moștenirea culturală turcă în Dobrogea (in Romanian), Constanța: Muzeul de Istorie Națională și Arheologie
- Akmolla, Gúner (2009). Necip Hacı Fazıl (in Crimean Tatar) (III ed.). Constanţa: Newline. pp. 54–56. ISBN 9786069206027.
- Ciorbea, Valentin (2011), "Dinamica și structura socio profesională a populației dobrogene (decembrie 1918-septembrie 1940)", in Stela Cheptea; Marusia Cirstea; Horia Dumitrescu (eds.), Istorie și societate (in Romanian), vol. II, București: Editura Mica Valahie, pp. 207–208, ISBN 9789737858719
- Petrescu, Marius (1999). "Tătari, și totuși fraţi". Formula AS (in Romanian). 1999 (383).
- Biblioteca Centrală Universitară Carol I. "Cerere de bursă din 1911" (in Romanian). Biblioteca Centrală Universitară Carol I. Archived from the original on 23 September 2015.
