= Ahmet Nurmambet =

Romanian Crimean Tatar soldier

- Born: 1893; Cugir, Austria-Hungary
- Died: 1953 (aged 59–60); Medgidia, Romania
- Spouse: Pakize Nurmambet
- Relatives: Kadriye Nurmambet (daughter); Ğengiz Nurmambet (son); Col. Refiyîk Kadír (uncle)
- Military career
- Allegiance: Romanian Army
- Branch: Cavalry
- Units: World War I - 12th Roșiori Regiment; World War II - 40th Infantry Regiment of the 9th Infantry Division
- Commands: World War II - Garrison of Medgidia
- Conflicts: World War I; Third Battle of Oituz; Battle of Mărășești

Ahmet Nurmambet was a Dobrujan Crimean Tatar who served in the Romanian Army. He was the father of the well-known traditional folk singer Kadriye Nurmambet.

== Biography ==
Ahmet was born in 1893. His uncle, Colonel Refiyîk Kadír put him on a path to a military career and in 1900 he was already a student at the Military secondary school in Iași. Upon his graduation in 1909 he entered military service ranked as second lieutenant of cavalry.

He served through World War I in mounted unit 12th Roşiori Regiment fighting on the front in the battles of Oituz and Mărășești.

After the war, with the reorganization of the Romanian Land Forces in the 1920s, his regiment joined the 40th Infantry Regiment of the 9th Infantry Division, which was initially stationed in Constanța, but later was transferred to Bazargic (now Dobrich, Bulgaria). In Bazargic he met Pakize from Kavarna. They married in 1931 and they had two children: Kadriye and Ğengiz. When, at the beginning of World War II in 1940, Romania ceded Southern Dobruja to Bulgaria, he was appointed commander of a garrison in Medgidia where he moved with his family.

Ahmet continually distinguished himself during his military career and he was awarded military orders and medals. He died in 1953.

== See also ==
- Kadriye Nurmambet
- Kázím Abdulakim
- Refiyîk Kadír

== Sources ==
- Agi-Amet, Gemal (1999). Dicţionarul personalităţilor turco-tătare din România (in Romanian). Constanta: Metafora. ISBN 9789739340274.
- Scurtu, Costin (25 September 2013). "Contribuţii la păstrarea tradiţiilor musulmane dobrogene în armata română". Lucrările Simpozionului internațional: Moștenirea culturală turcă în Dobrogea, Muzeul de Istorie Națională și Arheologie, Constanța by Tasin Gemil, Gabriel Custurea, Delia Roxana Cornea (in Romanian). 2013 (1).
