= Ismail H. A. Ziyaeddin =

Ismail H.A. Ziyaeddin
- Born: 13 November 1912; Constanța, Romania
- Died: 3 May 1996 (aged 83); Bucharest, Romania
- Occupation: poet
- Known for: Adapting the Latin alphabet to the special needs of the Crimean Tatar language, Co-authoring the first Tatar language textbooks with Latin script in Romania.
- Parent(s): Hağí Ahmet Ziyaeddin (1875–1963); Fatma H.A. Ziyaeddin (1880–1971)
- Relatives: Mustafa H.A. Ziyaeddin (1910-1976) (brother)

Ismail H.A. Ziyaeddin (also known as Ismail H. A. Ziyayddin) (13 November 1912 – 3 May 1996) was a Crimean Tatar poet known for adapting the Latin alphabet to the special needs of the Crimean Tatar language and co-authoring the first Tatar language textbooks with Latin script in Romania.

== Biography ==
Ziyaeddin was born on 13 November 1912 to Hağí Ahmet (1875–1963) and Fatma (1880–1971) in Constanța. His father Hağí Ahmet hailed from Crimea. After studying theology in Turkey he settled in Romania serving as imam and marrying the daughter of Sheikh Islam Omer.

Ziyaeddin grew up in his hometown where he attended the primary school in Tatar language and he graduated with excellent results from the Medrese of Medğidiye/Medgidia. He was fond of Tatar literary and musical folklore. He played the violin and he was often seen learning new songs.

After graduating he continued deepening his knowledge of Asian languages and literature, to record and to establish similarities between the Turkic languages. Between 1932 and 1937 he worked at the national lottery. Between 1940 and 1942 he served as personal assistant of the Mufti of Constanța.

From 1942 until 1944 he served as imam at the mosque located in the Carol I Park in Bucharest, which was later demolished to make room for the Mausoleum of the Communist Heroes built on its site. In 1950 he graduated from Timișoara Faculty of Civil Engineering.

He translated from Romanian into Crimean Tatar poems of Mihai Eminescu and George Coşbuc.

In 1985 his poems have been published by Şukran Vuap-Mocanu in the Tatar Language Course at the University of Bucharest.

He died on 3 May 1996 in Bucharest.

== See also ==
- Crimean Tatars
- List of Crimean Tatars

== Sources ==
- Önal, Mehmet Naci (1997). "Romanya Türklerinin Günümüz Edebiyatı". Türk Dünyası Dil ve Edebiyat Dergisi (in Turkish). 1997 (4). Türk Dil Kurumu: 15–39.
- Vuap-Mocanu, Şukran (1985). Curs practic de limbă tătară (in Romanian). Bucharest: University of Bucharest, Faculty of Foreign Languages and Literatures.
- Ekrem, Mehmet Ali (1994). Din Istoria Turcilor Dobrogeni (in Romanian). Bucharest: Kriterion. ISBN 9789732603840.
