= 23 August, Constanța =

23 August
- Commune
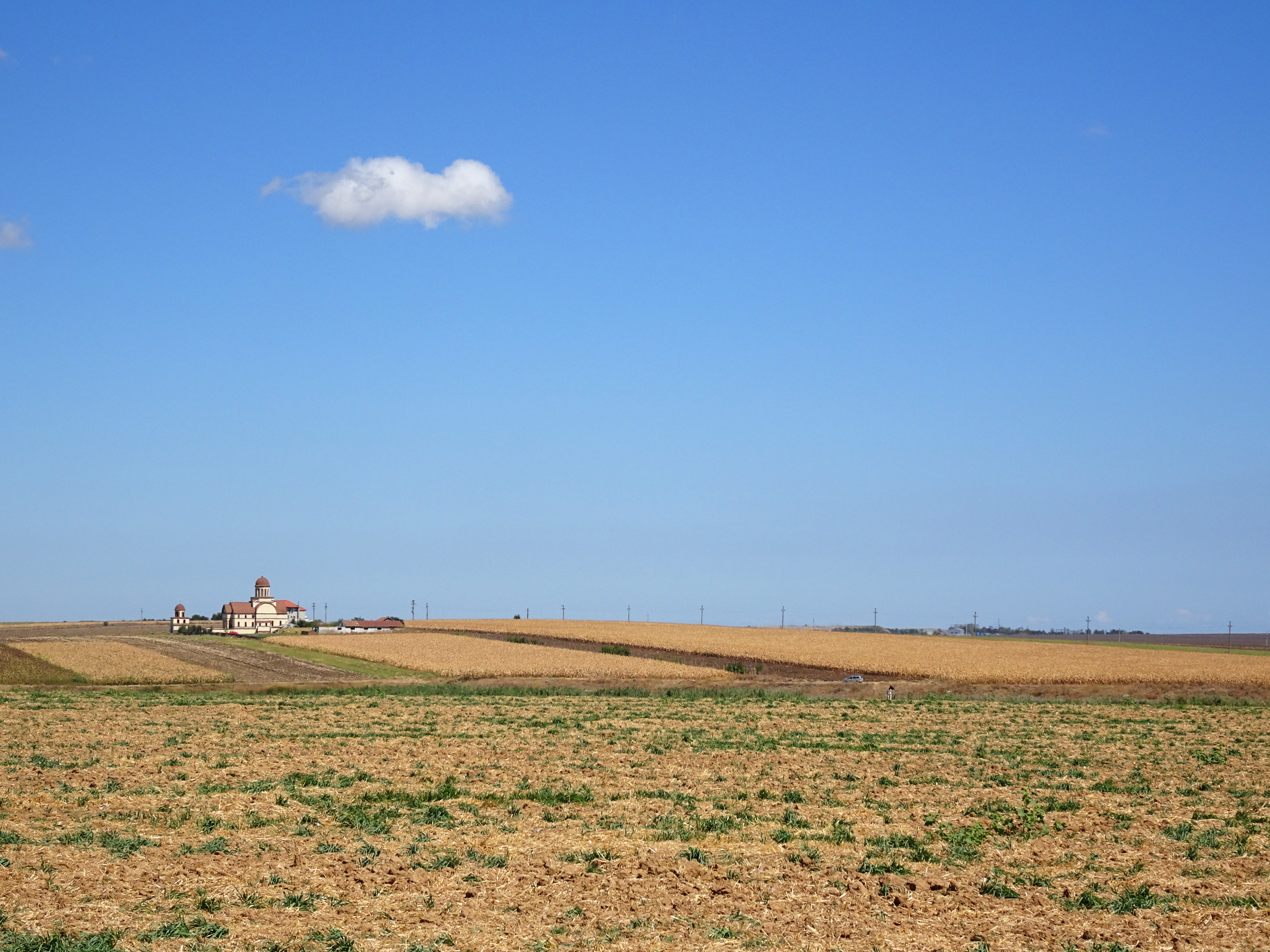
- Monastery near 23 August

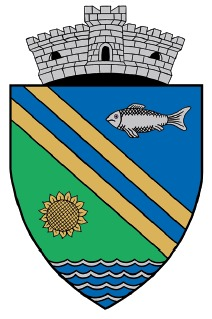
- Coat of arms

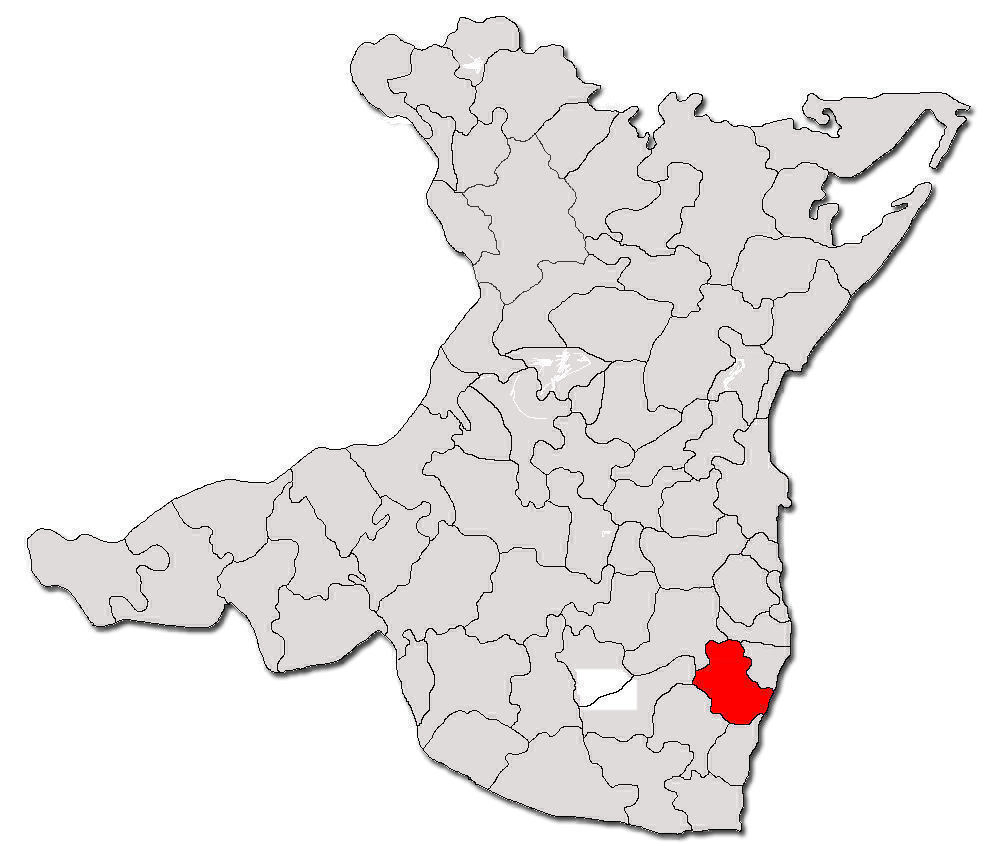
- Location in Constanța County

- Location in Romania
- Coordinates: 43°55′0.12″N 28°34′50.34″E
- Country: Romania
- County: Constanța
- Subdivisions: 23 August, Dulcești, Moșneni

Government
  - Mayor (2020–2024): Mugur Viorel Mitrana (PNL)
- Area: 74.94 km^{2} (28.93 sq mi)
- Elevation: 20 m (66 ft)
- Population (2021-12-01): 5,178
  - Density: 69.10/km^{2} (179.0/sq mi)
- Time zone: UTC+02:00 (EET)
  - Summer (DST): UTC+03:00 (EEST)
- Postal code: 907005
- Area code: +(40) x41
- Vehicle reg.: CT
- Website: www.primaria23august.ro

23 August (Romanian: Douăzeci și Trei August) is a commune in Constanța County, Northern Dobruja, Romania. The commune includes three villages:

- 23 August (historical names: Tatlâgeac Mare, Turkish: Büyük-Tatlıcak; Domnița Elena) – named after the day of the 1944 royal coup d'état
- Dulcești (historical name: Tatlâgeac Mic, Turkish: Küçük-Tatlıcak)
- Moșneni (historical name: Pervelia, Turkish: Perveli)

== Demographics ==
Historical population
Year	Pop.	±%
2002	5,279	—
2011	5,483	+3.9%
2021	5,178	−5.6%
Source: Census data

At the 2011 census, 23 August had 5,483 inhabitants, of which 4,813 (91.36%) were Romanians, 408 (7.74%) Tatars, 20 (0.38%) Turks, 20 (0.38%) Roma, and 7 (0.13%) others. At the 2021 census, the commune had a population of 5,178; of those, 84.32% were Romanians and 5.21% Tatars.

== Natives ==
- Sîdîyîk Ibrahim H. Mîrzî (1909–1959), Crimean Tatar spiritual leader
- Ștefan Orza (born 2001), kickboxer
