= Tatars in Bulgaria =

Ethnic group

Bulgarian: Татари в България

Total population
- 1,129 (2021)

Languages
- Bulgarian, Turkish, Crimean Tatar (Dobrujan Tatar) and Nogai

Religion
- Islam

Tatars in Bulgaria are in majority Crimean Tatar, but also Nogai Tatar minorities in Bulgaria.

== History ==
=== Events in the Middle Ages ===
After 1241, the year of the earliest recorded Tatar invasion of Bulgaria, the Second Bulgarian Empire maintained constant political contact with the Tatars. In this early period (13th and 14th century), "Tatar" was not an ethnonym but a general term for the armies of Genghis Khan’s successors. The first Tatar settlements in Bulgaria may be dated to the late 13th and early 14th centuries, when military units persecuted in the wake of dynastic feuds in the Golden Horde defected to Bulgarian rulers (Pavlov, 1997).

From the late 14th to the late 15th century, several groups of Tatars settled in Ottoman-ruled Bulgaria for various reasons. The settlers, probably nomads, eventually adopted a sedentary way of life and, in some areas, survived as compact communities for more than two centuries. The records show that the Tatars were inclined to raid villages and resist authority, and were therefore resettled in Thrace, where the native population was also restive. The Tatars were assigned special messenger and military missions and were incorporated into the Ottoman military administration. This fact, along with their small number, the closeness between the Tatar and Ottoman Turkish language, and the common religion, led to the eventual loss of group Tatar identity.

=== Immigration in the 18th and 19th centuries ===
Unlike the situation in Thrace, the ethnic composition of Dobruja attests to the existence of a large Tatar community from the 15th to the 20th century. The Ottoman conquest of Bessarabia created conditions for the constant migration of Tatars from the northern Black Sea region to Dobruja in the 1530s and 1540s.

The 18th century saw the beginning of a radical change in the ethnic composition of the northern Black Sea region as a result of Russian invasions. Between 1783, when the Crimean Khanate was annexed to the Russian Empire, and 1874, there were several waves of emigration from the Crimea and Kuban, and a considerable number of Crimean Tatars settled in the Bulgarian lands. The Tatars who live in Bulgaria today are descended from those immigrants, who kept their identity.

The largest wave of emigration was during and after the Crimean War (1853–1856). Of the approximately 230,000 Tatars who emigrated from 1854 to 1862, about 60,000 settled in Bulgarian territory (Romanski, 1917, p. 266), mostly in Dobruja, on the Danube plain and in the Vidin region. The mass settlement of Tatars on Bulgarian lands led to the establishment of relations between Bulgarians and Tatars. Unlike in the case of Circassians, the Bulgarian National Revival did not disapprove of the settlement of Tatars.

The Tatars themselves were in a state of ethno-psychological shock but succeeded in adapting to their changed circumstances. This first period in the modern history of the Tatars of Bulgaria (until 1878) was characterized by economic and environmental adjustment to the new realities and the consolidation of all Kipchak-speaking refugees.

The development of the Tatar group and its identity after Bulgaria's 1878 liberation was determined by political factors. On the one hand, the host country changed. Having settled in the Ottoman Empire, the Tatars, who had not changed their ethnic and ecological environment, suddenly found themselves in another political entity - Bulgaria, a state that differed greatly from its predecessor. This came as another ethno-psychological shock to the Tatars and prompted a new wave of emigration. Even those who remained in Bulgaria - about 18,000 people, most of them in the areas with Turkish populations in northeastern Bulgaria - found it hard to achieve a balance, and many of them eventually emigrated to Turkey.

The second factor was the nascent Crimean Tatar national "renaissance" and differentiation in the late 19th and early 20th centuries. Notably, the national idea of the Crimean Tatars developed at a time when the majority of them were beyond the boundaries of their historical homeland. They were thus susceptible to assimilation, which, in the Bulgarian context, meant assimilation not to ethnic Bulgarians but to a minority ethnic group - the Bulgarian Turks.

Other factors also accounted for the specificity of each period in the history of the Tatars in Bulgaria. In the post-liberation period (1878-1912/1918), there were generally no major changes in the Tatar group - there was no large-scale emigration, and the process of ethnic consolidation continued.

=== 20th century ===
The period from the Treaty of Neuilly to the Treaty of Craiova (1919–1940) saw a number of radical changes. Southern Dobruja, home to two-thirds of Bulgaria's Tatar population, was annexed to Romania. The Tatars found themselves in a state with large Tatar populations around Medgidia, Mangalia, and Köstence (Constanţa). On the other hand, the start of this period coincided with a short-lived Tatar nation-state in Crimea and the constitution of the Turkish secular state. Modern Tatar nationalism embraced Pan-Turkism and turned to Ankara for support as a result of Kemalist propaganda. This period saw large-scale Tatar emigration to Turkey and the establishment of a circle around the magazine "Emel" (1929-1930 in Dobrich), which used Pan-Turkic slogans as a cover for the promulgation of Turkish policies. Arguably, this was the beginning of the political Turkification of Tatars (Antonov, 1995).

The general tendencies remained the same in the next period (1940 to the early 1950s), except that Bulgaria recovered Southern Dobruja, whose Tatar population had decreased by half.

In the communist period, collectivization and industrialization destroyed the traditional lifestyle of the Tatars too. The natural but slow assimilation into the Turkish community - endogamy was no longer possible considering the small number of the Tatar population - was intensified by modernization. There was also a socioeconomic factor, the desire to take advantage of the privileges which the communist authorities granted to the Turkish community.

The communist regime pursued inconsistent policies towards the Tatars. It originally adopted Moscow's attitude to the Crimean Tatars, officially ignoring their presence in Bulgaria (they were last mentioned in the 1956 census, finally reappearing in the post-communist census of 1992).

In 1962, the Politburo of the Bulgarian Communist Party’s Central Committee proposed taking action against the Turkification of Gypsies, Tatars, and Pomaks. The measures included a study of the ethnic origins of Bulgaria’s Tatars. This attested to a new policy: accentuating the community's ethnocultural specificity in an effort to highlight and restore the distinction (blurred as a result of Turkification) between Tatars and Turks.

The reforms in the 1990s have led to a restoration of Islamic Turkic names and the creation of conditions for normal contacts with relatives in Turkey, as well as for independent cultural and educational activities. There have been signs of a rebirth of Tatar identity.

== Ethnonym ==
In the last census (2021), 1,129 Bulgarian citizens identified as Tatars. The ethnonym plays the main role in Tatar self-identification.

The Crimean Tatars (Qirim Tatarlari, Tatarlar), against the background of the impressive popularity of the term as an ethnicon in Eurasia, were the first to adopt it as an ethnonym after Genghis Khan wiped out the original Tatars.

Due to the specificity of the Crimean Tatar ethnogenesis, other ethnonyms are also in use; they have now lost their concrete ethnic content and are, rather, a memory, perception, pejorative name, a supplementary term, and very rarely, a group indicator: Nogay, Tat, Kazan, Kipchak, Laz, Kazak. They are used as a modifier of the general ethnonym, for instance, Nogay Tatari. Informants have the clearest perception of the Nogay as a separate group of a distinct type of people (prominent cheekbones and inure Mongolian), dialect ("truer Tatar"), livelihood (horse-breeding), and even character. In fact, the most differentiated group are the Tats, the informants know who they are, and they themselves identify as such. Their distinction is based on their dialect. Informants claim that there are Kazan Tatars in Bulgaria; they are "fatter". They have only heard about Kipchaks. Laz Tatars reportedly speak a language similar to Turkish. The Kazaks are perceived as a "tribe" related to the "Don Kazaks" (Cossacks), which, however, is Muslim. The more prosaic version is that "Kazak" is a "nickname": "We call a "Kazak" someone who is headstrong, stubborn".

Apart from the ethnic terms, Tatars are also divided into subgroups distinguished by territorial origin: Kerisler (from Kerch), Shongarlar (from Chongar), Orlular (from Or; Russian Perekop). There is also a subdivision of Tatars identified by a personal name - "Sora Tatari", from the name of the tribal chief and Tatar epic hero Chora Batyr (Tasheva. 1975. pp. 2–73).

As regards the ethnonym as a marker of ethnicity, there are traces of internal ethnic differentiation among the Tatars as part of - and, at the same time, in opposition to their collective identity.

The Turks and the Bulgarians have come to use the popular term "Tatar" as a stereotype (6) rather than an ethnonym. The influence of folklore and, later, of historical texts, is indicative in this respect. In Bulgarian folklore, "the Tatars" are a symbol of the strange and the unknown, and have pejorative connotations (Antonov, 1995). Unlike those who do not know any Tatars in real life, those who do have a positive attitude to them. The negative attitude is associated with the ethnonym of the Tatars, and not with the other markers of their group identity.

== Origins ==
The Crimean Tatar ethnos originated on the territory of the Crimean peninsula and inland steppes in the 14th and 15th centuries. The main ethnic components that were successively incorporated into the new ethnos were the ancient indigenous populations (for example -Bat-Bayan's protobulgarians), the Kumans, and finally, the Kipchakized Mongol clans. Due to the slave trade and the military campaigns for the capture of slaves, economic mainstays of the Crimean khanate - other ethnoses also contributed to the Tatar genotype.

The Tatars in Bulgaria were formed as a group with a common identity as a result of the ethnic consolidation of the immigrants: Crimean Tatars proper, Nogay, Karachai and the distinct group of the Tatar. Their consolidation was based on the close languages, common destiny, and political idea of belonging to the former Crimean khanate and respective ethno-social formations.

The Tatars associate their common descent with the idea of a homeland: "we are all from the Crimea", "the Crimea is the homeland of our ancestors" - as well as with their knowledge about its history and the destiny of their own people.

The Tatars stress their specific anthropological type. They regard it as the main marker of Tatar identity, second only to the language. For example, Tatars from Golyamo Vranovo say that those from Vetovo are "truer Tatars" not only because their language is "purer", but also because they have "larger heads and slit eyes. The Tatars also differ from the others in that most of them are "dark-eyed", with a "broad, flat face". Their neighbors likewise regard the specific appearance as a main distinctive feature of the Tatars. They talk of a "Tatar face".

== Language ==
Crimean Tatar is a Kipchak language from the Western Turkic language group, which, however, has been strongly influenced by Oguz through Ottoman Turkish. The Tatars in Bulgaria speak various local dialects developed in a foreign linguistic environment. This process is very complicated and has continued to the present day. On the one hand, the idiolects of speakers of the main dialects are modifying and tending to become standardized, with a particular dialect prevailing in a particular population center but strongly influenced by other dialects (Boev, 1971, p. 81).

Along with the standardization of the Kipchak dialects of refugees, there was a process of Oghuzation too. This process can be traced back to the pre-emigration Oghuz tradition in the literary Crimean Tatar language (Boev, 1971, p. 94). After the Tatars settled in the Bulgarian lands, the influence of Ottoman Turkish on the vernacular intensified. The Tatar language was at a disadvantage; the official language was Ottoman Turkish and did not develop a literary variant (Boev, 1964, pp. 81–2).

After the Liberation, the process intensified to the point of linguistic assimilation, mainly because Tatars and Turks communicated in Turkish and, later, because most children were sent to Turkish rather than Tatar schools (Boev, 1964, p. 2 Boev, 1971, p. 109). In 1910, 546 Tatars from Southern Dobruja cited Turkish as their native language.

The choice of Turkish in the past few years has also been largely determined by the fact that the Tatars do not have access to Crimean Tatar literature and read the available Turkish books. The boom of Turkish satellite television has also affected the Tatar language. For a considerable section of the Tatar community. Tatar remains a means of communication among elderly people only. Children understand but do not speak the language.

The Tatars started learning Bulgarian even before the Liberation (Kanitz, 1932. p. 141). When Southern Dobruja was under Romanian rule, the Tatars went to Romanian schools and, according to Bulgarian sources, learnt Romanian very quickly. Bulgarian was spoken by the males in their social contacts and at work. Today, even the most elderly Tatar women understand Bulgarian. The Tatars in contemporary Bulgaria are trilingual, but there is a strong tendency towards the replacement of Tatar by Turkish.

The Tatars regard the Tatar language as a distinctive feature of their collective identity and ethnic differentiation from the others: "We don’t speak either pure Turkish or [pure] Bulgarian - we are Tatars". The main marker of Tatarlik " Tatar ethnicity " is the Tatar language. This is also illustrated by a Tatar proverb.

A Tatar who does not speak Tatar with Tatars is not worthy of his mother's milk (7).

The Tatars qualify the loss of the Tatar language as a loss of ethnicity: "Where the Tatars were a minority, they have been assimilated. The Young no longer speak Tatar, yet in the past, some Turkish women who married Tatars would eventually forget Turkish"; "The Tatars have now mixed […] The language is also mixed"; "We have mixed. We speak almost Turkish [only]. Few Tatars have remained".

Informants say that intermarriage leads to ethnic assimilation because that is the easiest way to lose the Tatar language. Still, there are people of Tatar origins who neither speak nor understand Tatar, yet have the self-awareness of "true Tatars" - probably in combination with a prioritized Turkish self-awareness. There is an interesting form of maintaining the lexical stock of Tatar dialects and of demonstrating Tatar ethnicity: when they meet, Tatars from different population centers will "test" each other on typical Tatar words. Bulgarians or Turks who speak Tatar also test the Tatars and declare themselves truer Tatars if the latter fail to give the right answer. This indicates that non-Tatars also regard language as an important ethnic marker of the Tatar community.

== Religion ==
The Tatars are Sunni Muslims. For them, religion is an important but not a main ethnic marker because it is identical to that of the Turks. Islam is seen as a basis of the community of all Muslims. Informants from the Tatar, as well as from other groups, tend to regard religion in general as a consolidating factor: "Tatars, Turks, Bulgarians - all are children of God".

The Tatars consider themselves good Muslims. The better educated and younger Tatars regard the Turks as fanatics and themselves as moderates - which they believe is an advantage. Respondents distinguish the two communities by the Islam-based segregation of women in the case of the Turks and the absence of such discrimination among the Tatars, as well as by the attitude to the Christians and the Alevites. The Tatars are tolerant towards the Alevites (Shias) while the Turks (who are Sunni) are not.

The other communities do not consider religion as a main distinctive feature of Tatar identity either, but rather as something that associates the Tatars with the Turks: "(they are) Muslims like the Turks". The Tatar Muslim community (where it is large enough) has its own institutional and ritual practices independent of the Turks. The Tatars celebrate religious holidays in their own esoteric circle and worship God in their own mosques. The Tatars built mosques of their own even right after they settled on Bulgarian territory, and this institution has survived in the population centers with larger Tatar communities. The "Tatar mosque" (for instance, in Vetovo) is a natural centre not only of religious, but also of socio-political life, a place for social contacts and internal demonstration of ethnicity. A map of the Crimea, the Tatar national flag arid photos of prominent Tatars usually hang on the walls; there are books too.

== Livelihood ==
The special status of the first Tatar settlers in the Ottoman Empire led to the emergence of a professional community designated as "Tatars" messengers and guides of strangers - which was eventually dissociated from the Tatar ethnicity. This is a classical case of the adoption of an ethnonym as a name of a profession.

Contemporary Tatars do not distinguish themselves from the other communities on the basis of occupation, but memories of the traditional livelihood have survived in their self-perception: "The Tatars used to be horse-breeders, they produced riders"; "They loved horses, they used to decorate them - with tassels".

In the late 19th and early 20th century, the traditional occupation of Tatars in the countryside was agriculture and in the towns, small-scale trade and various crafts: cartage, candle-making, furriery, butchery, coffee-making, bow production, barbering.

According to Bulgarian sources, Tatar carters were famous for their skills. Some Turkish carters would even claim that they were Tatars. This stereotyping from the recent past has undoubtedly influenced contemporary attitudes to the Tatars.

== Symbols ==
Informants say that "the old flag of the Tatars was a horsetail’’. The modern one is the golden mark of the Ghirais on a blue-green background. It can occasionally be seen on badges and streamers. Tatar leaders have a tape of the "national anthem," too.

The now "traditional" Tatar festivals have come to play the role of symbols. From 1990 to 1996, such festivals were held in Onogur (Dobrič district), Čerkovna (Silistra district) Vetovo (Ruse district). Kăpinovo, Jovkovo and Topola (Dobrič district). There were three ours of the folk ensembles from Northern Dobruja, which were identified as "Tatar", but most of their performances were in Turkish. The festivals are seen as a distinct demonstration and symbol of Tatar identity. The poem 'I am Tatar', which every younger Tatar knows by heart, is often recited.

== Traditional culture ==
The original Tatar cultural tradition was lost in the course of modernization, but elements of the Islamic tradition have survived. The Tatars know and remember, but do not practice their traditional culture. Informants remember typical Tatar elements in the design of houses and costumes (Tatar women did not wear veils), which, however, were abandoned in the process of modernization.

Today Tatars cite traditional food as a marker of their identity: "The Turks adopted Tatar food too, but they can’t prepare it and don’t like it"; or the proverb "The right of the Tatar is meat and rakia". Tatar legends also associate ethnicity with food. Here is how a story explains the death of entire Tatar villages after the settlement: "they fell sick because they weren’t used to the food. They were used to meat, but the Turks ate tarhana [dried ground dough] only - Tatars can’t do without meat". There are special customs for preparing certain dishes, which are therefore seen as traditional Tatar fare.

Most informants believe that the Tatar holidays and customs are original. A smaller part do not think that they are very different from the Turkish, since both are Muslim. The process of extinction of traditional culture has intensified: "We came here long ago, nor are we pure Tatar families only - so that’s how Tatar customs have become of secondary importance and are thus eventually forgotten.

Informants cite the following unique Tatar holidays: Nawrez, the Tatar first day of spring and, in the past, New Year; Tepres, the Tatar St. Sophia’s Day and, in some villages, St. George’s Day; and Qidirlez, the Tatar St George’s Day. They always cite Tatar elements in other rituals - noting, for instance, that "the Turks don’t have that".

== See also ==
- Tatars of Romania
- Turks in Bulgaria

== Sources ==
- Antonov, Stoyan, Tatarite v Bulgaria, Dobrich.
