= Refiyîk Kadír =

Officer

- Born: 1879; Constanța
- Died: 20 December 1929; Bazargic, Kingdom of Romania (now Dobrich, Bulgaria)
- Burial place: Bazargic Heroes Cemetery
- Relatives: Ahmet Nurmambet (nephew)
- Military career
- Allegiance: Romanian Army
- Rank: Colonel
- Unit: 40th "Călugăreni" Infantry Regiment
- Conflicts: World War I

Refiyîk Kadír was a Dobrujan-born Crimean Tatar officer regarded as a hero of the Romanian Army. He was the uncle of Ahmet Nurmambet who was the father of the well-known traditional folk singer Kadriye Nurmambet.

== Biography ==
Refiyík was born in 1878 in Constanța. He attended the Turkish primary school in Constanta and then followed a military career at the Military secondary school in Iaşi. Upon his graduation he entered the military service ranked as second lieutenant and climbed the hierarchy to the rank of colonel.

Refiyík fought in World War I and he was taken prisoner. After the war he was released and he served in the garrisons of Cernăuţi and Chișinău. Later he returned to Dobruja holding command positions in the 40th "Călugăreni" Infantry Regiment which had its garrison in Bazargic. He was an educated man, helpful, generous and friendly. He enjoyed the friendship of Senator Selim Abdulakim and Nicolae Iorga.

Kadír died on 20 December 1929. He is resting at Bazargic Heroes Cemetery.

== See also ==
- Ahmet Nurmambet
- Kadriye Nurmambet
- Kázím Abdulakim

== Sources ==
- Agi-Amet, Gemal (1999). Dicţionarul personalităţilor turco-tătare din România (in Romanian). Constanta: Metafora. ISBN 9789739340274.
- Scurtu, Costin (24–25 September 2013). "Contribuţii la păstrarea tradiţiilor musulmane dobrogene în armata română". Lucrările Simpozionului internațional: Moştenirea culturală turcă în Dobrogea, Muzeul de Istorie Națională şi Arheologie, Constanța by Tasin Gemil, Gabriel Custurea, Delia Roxana Cornea (in Romanian). 2013 (1).
