= Yusuf Isa Halim =

Tatar poet and linguist (1894–1982)

Yusuf Isa Halim Iusuf Isa Halim
- Born: 1894; Bílbíl, today Ciocârlia, Constanța County, Romania
- Died: 1982 (aged 87–88); Medgidia, Constanța County, Socialist Republic of Romania
- Occupations: Poet, schoolteacher, linguist
- Known for: He authored the first Romanian-Turkish dictionary.

Yusuf Isa Halim (also transliterated in Romanian as Iusuf Isa Halim; Romanian pronunciation: [juˈsuf iˈsa haˈlim]) (1894–1982) was a Dobrujan-born Tatar poet, schoolteacher and linguist known for authoring the first Romanian-Turkish dictionary.

== Biography ==
Yusuf Isa was born in 1894 in Bílbíl, today officially known as Ciocârlia, a Nogai village situated in the Tatar countryside west of Mangalia, in Dobruja. He graduated in 1915 from the Medrese of Medğidiye/Medgidia and he served as a schoolteacher in Malşuwa/Abrud, Kavarna, Pazarjik, Bogaz-Kóy (Cernavodă). In 1930 he published in Pazarjik, now Dobrich in Bulgaria, the first Romanian-Turkish dictionary.

== See also ==
- Tatars in Romania

== Sources ==
- Ekrem, Mehmet Ali (1994). Din Istoria Turcilor Dobrogeni (in Romanian). București: Kriterion. ISBN 9789732603840.
- Gârlan, Miktat (June 2005). "Bükreş Türkleri tarih ve demografi". Hakses (in Turkish). 2005 (June).
- Munteanu, Ana Maria (n.d.). "Muzeul etnografic viu și imaginile sale în mentalul occidental" (in Romanian). adinterculturala.wordpress.com. Asociația pentru Dezvoltare Interculturală.
