= Democratic Union of Turkic-Muslim Tatars of Romania =

Democratic Union of Turkic-Muslim Tatars of Romania Uniunea Democrată a Tătarilor Turco-Musulmani din România Romanya Müslüman Tatar Türklerĭ Demokrat Bĭrlĭgĭ
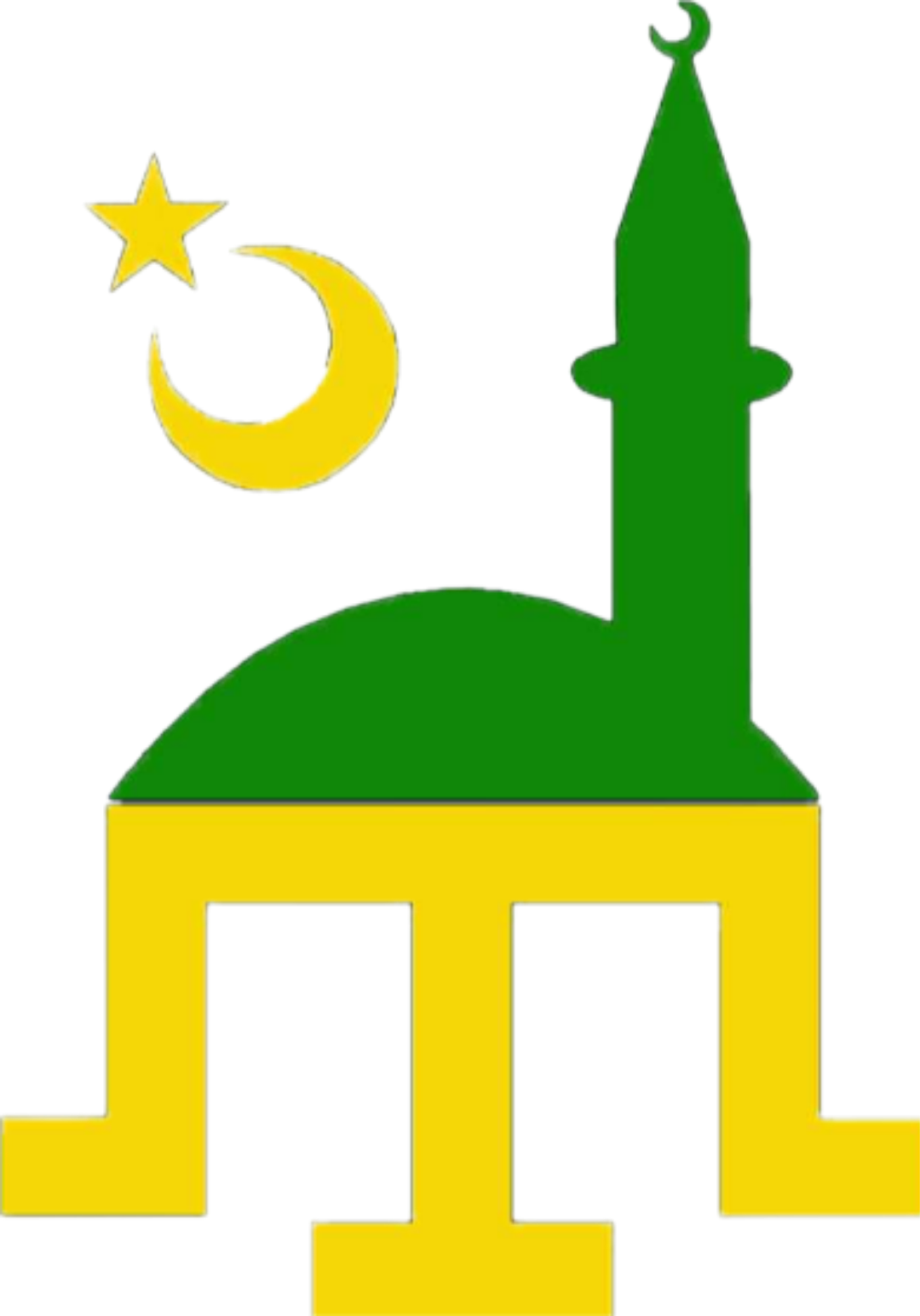
- Leader: Gelil Eserghep Bey
- Founded: 29 December 1989
- Ideology: Dobrujan Tatar minority interests
- National affiliation: National Minorities Parliamentary Group
- Slogan: Bĭrlĭkte quwetĭmĭz (We are strong together); Tĭlde, fĭkĭrde, ĭște bĭrlĭk (Unity in language, thought and work)
- Chamber of Deputies: 1 / 329
- Senate: 0 / 136
- European Parliament: 0 / 32

Website
- uniuneatatara.ro

The Democratic Union of Turkic-Muslim Tatars of Romania (Note: Romanian name: Uniunea Democrată a Tătarilor Turco-Musulmani din România, UDTTMR; Dobrujan Tatar name: Romanya Müslüman Tatar Türklerĭ Demokrat Bĭrlĭgĭ, RMTTDB) is an ethnic minority political party in Romania representing the Tatar community.

== History ==
The party was formed on 29 December 1989 as the Turkish Muslim Democratic Union of Romania (Uniunea Democrată Turcă Musulmană din România, UDTMR). On 12 April 1990 the new party split, with a breakaway faction forming the Ethnic Turkish Minority Union of Romania (UMETR), which later became the Democratic Turkish Union of Romania. The May 1990 general elections saw the party receive only 0.06% of the vote, but it won a single seat in the Chamber of Deputies under the electoral law that allows for political parties representing ethnic minority groups to be exempt from the electoral threshold. As a result of the split in April, the party adopted its present name on 23 July 1990.

The party has contested every election between 1990 and 2012, winning a single seat on each occasion.

== Electoral history ==
Election	Chamber of Deputies			Senate		
Election	Votes	%	Seats	Votes	%	Seats
1990	8,600	0.06	1	8,439	0.06	0
1992	7,699	0.07	1			
1996	6,319	0.05	1	–	–	–
2000	10,380	0.09	1	9,226	0.08	0
2004	6,452	0.06	1			
2008	11,868	0.17	1	–	–	–
2012	9,291	0.13	1	–	–	–

== Notable people ==
- Negiat Sali

== Important dates, activities, events and actions ==
- Commemoration of Kemal Karpat – February 20
- Commemoration of Numan Çelebi Cihan – February 23
- Sebat Husein commemoration – March 13
- Commemoration of Yaşar Memedemin – March 15
- Nawrez holiday – March 21
- Commemoration of Ismail Ziyaedin – May 3
- Tatar Language Day – May 5
- Commemoration of Kerim Altay – May 5
- Qıdırlez holiday – May 6
- Europe Day – May 9
- SÜRGÜN Commemoration – Deportation of Crimean Tatars – May 18
- Day of the national flag of Romania and the Crimean Tatars – June 26
- Commemoration of Musa Geavit – July 5
- Commemoration Ali Osman Bekmambet
- Romania's National Anthem Day – July 29
- Commemoration of Şefika Gaspirali – August 31
- Commemoration of Ismail Gaspirali – September 11
- Commemoration of Gevat Rașit – September 13
- National Day of the Republic of Turkey – October 29
- Dobrogea Day – November 14
- "Mehmet Niyazi" award – November 30
- Romania's National Day – December 1
- The celebration of the Tatar Ethnicity in Romania (Tatar Day) – December 13
- Minority Day – December 18
- Ashura Day
- Ramazan bayram holiday
- The holiday of Qurban bayram
- The "History and Civilization of the Tatars" course organized in collaboration with "Ovidius" University Constanța
- Community Tatar language courses
- Thematic Tatar language camps for children
- Camp for Olympians "We reward value, we recognize excellence!"
- Tatar music festival "Sebat Husein"
- "Gevat Rashid" Festival – Lumina
- "Yașar Memedemin" Festival – Trajan's Wall
- "Mehmet Niyazi" Award – Medgidia
- The Ghiudem Festival – Mihail Kogălniceanu
- Qatlama – Techirghiol Festival
- Sarmalelor Festival – AgigeA
- Kurabiye Festival – Medgidia
- Şuberek Festival – Cobadin
- Tepreș-Murfatlar country festival
- International Kureș Trophy "Black Sea Cup" – Medgidia
- Tatar Festival – Tuzla
- The TV show "Tatars from Romania"
