= Mehmet Yakub Septar =

Romanian Crimean Tatar lawyer and mufti (1904–1991)

Mehmet Yakub Septar Mehmet Iacub Septar
- Born: 1904; Azaplar/(now Tătaru), Constanța, Kingdom of Romania
- Died: 1991 (aged 86–87); Constanța, Constanța County, Romania
- Resting place: Constanța Muslim Central Cemetery; 44.173046°N 28.622309°E
- Occupations: lawyer, Mufti of Romania
- Years active: 1947–1990 (Mufti)
- Known for: He was a promoter of harmony and peace
- Predecessor: Mitat Rifat
- Successor: Ablakim Ibrahim
- Spouse: Zeyneb (1902–1975)
- Children: Saadet (daughter)

Mehmet Yakub Septar (known in Romanian as Mehmet Iacub Septar) (1904–1991) was a Crimean Tatar lawyer, thinker, spiritual leader of Tatars and Turks in Dobruja, Mufti of the Muslim community in Romania. He was a promoter of harmony and peace.

== Biography ==
Septar was born in 1904 in Azaplar, situated in the Tatar countryside west of Mangalia, a village known today by its official name Tătaru. He studied law at the University of Bucharest and he served in Constanța Bar Association. He backed the emigration to Turkey.

He served as Mufti through the entire Communist era in his country, between 31 December 1947 and 1990, being preceded by Mitat Rifat and succeeded by Ablakim Ibrahim. As head of the Muslim Cult, he was placed by Securitate under secret surveillance in operation "The Sultan" under allegations of insulting USSR and attempting to establish in 1950 a Muslim World Peace Organization.

During Nicolae Ceaușescu's years in office he represented the community in the Great National Assembly, now Parliament of Romania. He was friends with fellow religious leaders such as Justinian and Teoctist, Patriarchs of the Romanian Orthodox Church and also Dr. Moses Rosen, the longtime Chief Rabbi of Romanian Jewry.

He had a good acquaintance with the Romanian culture and became one of Romania's important speakers on the international scene, a non official "ambassador" during his visits in Arab and Muslim countries. He thought that "Israel and the Arabs must come together and talk peace directly."

In 1990, when the editors of Renkler Journal in Bucharest led by historian Tahsin Gemil created the Tatar movement based on ideas of cultural and linguistic uniformity, Septar opposed this project creating a movement with cultural diversity conservation views activating under the motto Tek niyet, mútenevviyet ("Unity in diversity").

Septar died in 1991, in Constanța. His body was laid to rest next to his wife, Zeyneb (1902–1975), in Constanța Muslim Central Cemetery at: 44.173046, 28.622309.

== Sources ==
- JTA (2 July 1968). "Rumanian Moslem Leader Greets Chief Rabbi Nissim at Rosen Anniversary Function". Jewish Telegraphic Agency.
- Bainbridge, Margaret, ed. (1993). The Turkic peoples of the world. Kegan Paul International, London and New York. ISBN 9780710304094.
- Leuştean, Lucian N. (2009). Orthodoxy and the Cold War: Religion and Political Power in Romania, 1947–65. Palgrave Macmillan. p. 250. ISBN 978-0-230-21801-7.
- Eminov, Ali (2000). "Turks in Bulgaria and Balkans". Nationalities Papers. 28 (1). doi:10.1080/00905990050002489. S2CID 153978673.
- Gabor, Adrian; Mureşan, Radu Petre (2006). Biserica Ortodoxă în Uniunea Europeană, Contribuţii necesare la securitatea şi stabilitatea europeană (in Romanian). Universitatea din București, Facultatea de Teologie Ortodoxă "Patriarhul Justinian", Editura Universităţii din Bucuresti. pp. 86, 89.
- Iusuf, Murat (18 February 2009). "Muftiul buclucas". murat-iusuf.blogspot.ro (in Romanian).
- Yuan, Changming (2015). "5 Poems by Taner Murat". Poetry Pacific. 4.1 (Spring 2015).
- Florescu, Ion (1975). Prezenţe musulmane în România/Muslims in Romania. Past and Present. With a Preface by Iacub Mehmet, Mufti of the Muslim Cult in the Socialist Republic of Romania (in Romanian). Bucharest: Meridiane.
- Şontică, Daniela Cârlea (7 February 2013). "La ceas de amintiri cu nepoata şi strănepoata patriarhului Teoctist – A fost cel mai înalt profesor al vieţii mele" [Reminiscing with the granddaughter and great-granddaughter of Patriarch Teoctist - He was the greatest teacher of my life] (in Romanian). Ziarul Lumina. Archived from the original on 27 June 2014.
- Ionescu, Sinziana (14 February 2015). "Fascinanta istorie a turcilor şi tătarilor din România: de la stăpânii Dobrogei otomane la supuşii unei ţări ortodoxe" [The fascinating history of the Turks and Tatars in Romania: from the masters of the Ottoman Dobrogea to the subjects of an Orthodox country] (in Romanian). adevarul.ro.\

== See also ==
- Islam in Romania
- Crimean Tatars
- List of Crimean Tatars
