= Ciocârlia, Constanța =

Ciocârlia
- Commune
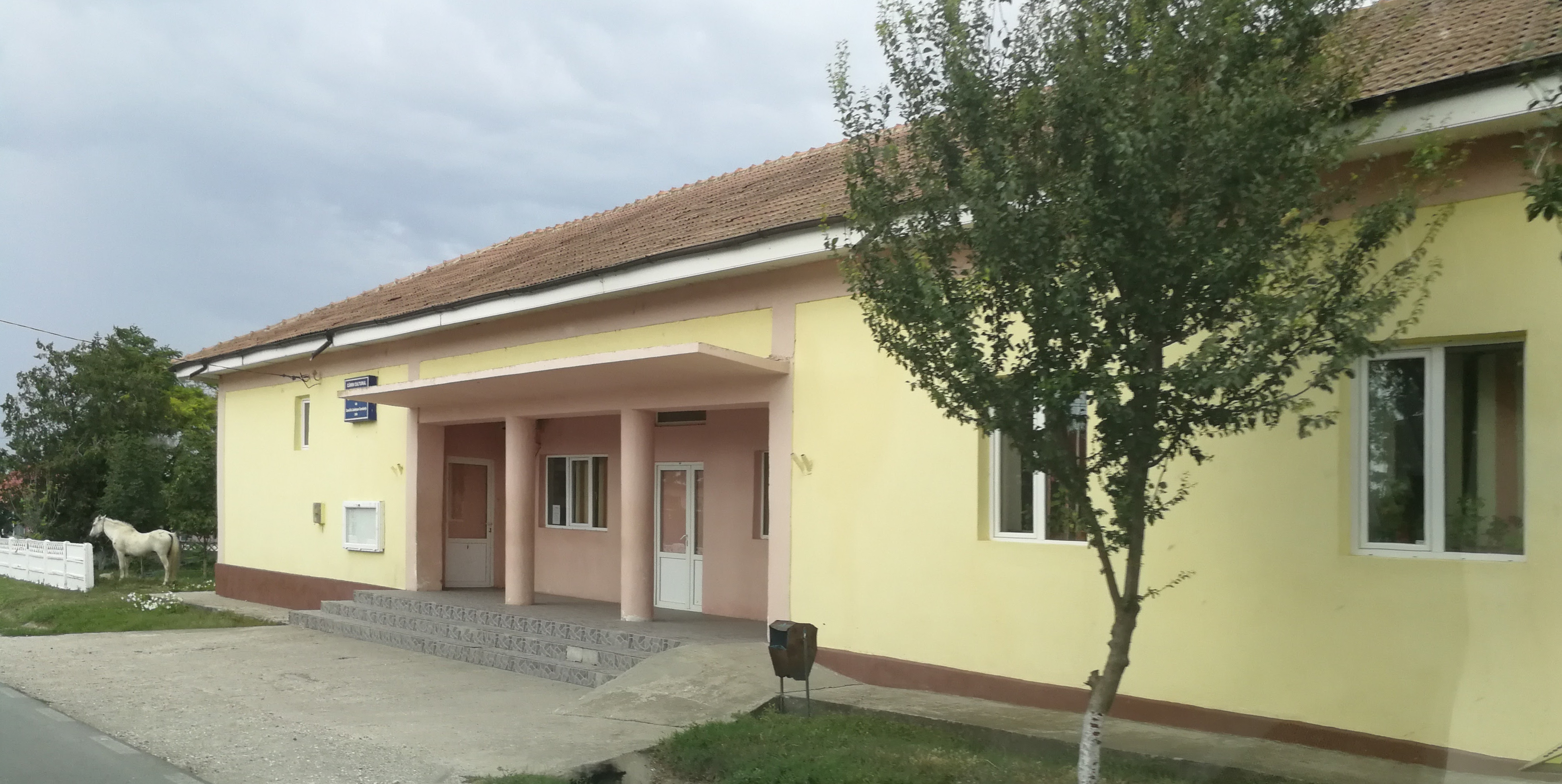
- Ciocârlia de Sus cultural center

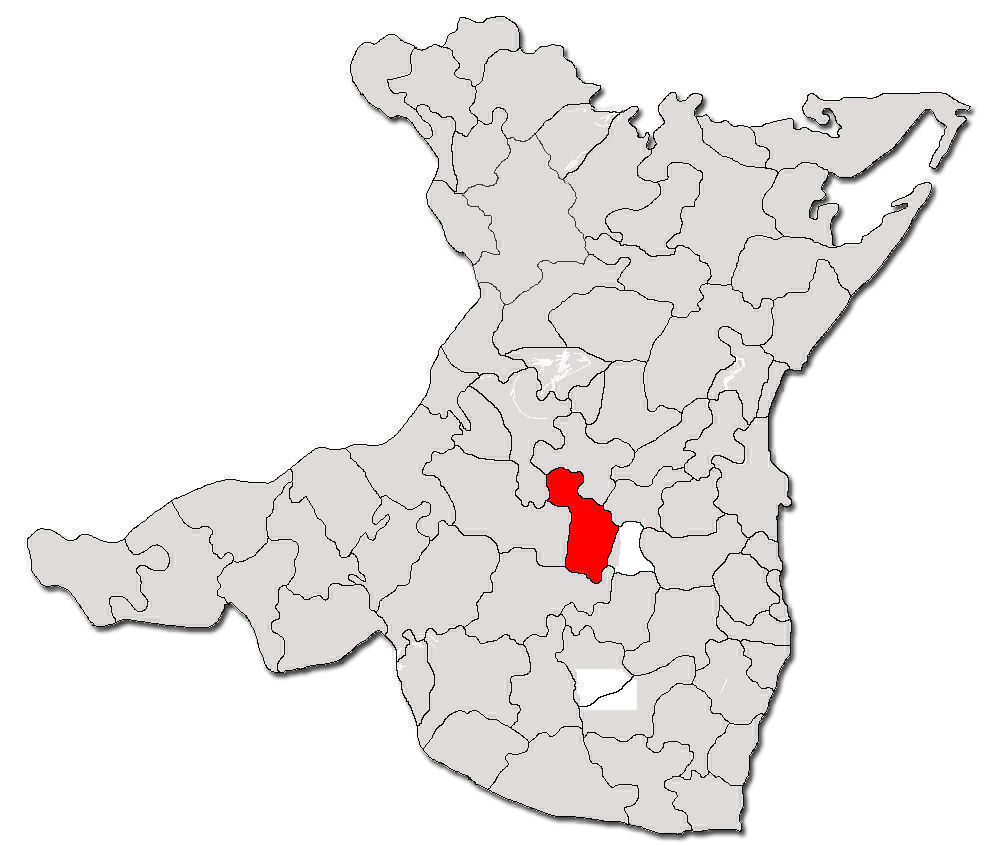
- Location in Constanța County

- Location in Romania
- Coordinates: 44°6′13″N 28°17′08″E
- Country: Romania
- County: Constanța
- Subdivisions: Ciocârlia, Ciocârlia de Sus

Government
  - Mayor (2020–2024): Ionuț Șerbu (PNL)
- Area: 140.56 km^{2} (54.27 sq mi)
- Elevation: 123 m (404 ft)
- Population (2021-12-01): 3,110
  - Density: 22.1/km^{2} (57.3/sq mi)
- Time zone: UTC+02:00 (EET)
  - Summer (DST): UTC+03:00 (EEST)
- Postal code: 907060
- Area code: +(40) x41
- Vehicle reg.: CT
- Website: www.primariaciocirlia.ro

Ciocârlia (Romanian pronunciation: [t͡ʃjokɨrˈli.a]) is a commune in Constanța County, Northern Dobruja, Romania. The commune includes two villages:

- Ciocârlia (historical names: Ciocârlia de Jos until 1968, Biulbiul-Mic, Turkish: Küçük Bülbül)
- Ciocârlia de Sus (historical names: Biulbiul-Mare, Turkish: Büyük Bülbül)

== Demographics ==
At the 2011 census, Ciocârlia had 3,220 inhabitants, of which 2,795 were Romanians (87.73%), 292 Tatars (9.17%), 91 Turks (2.86%), and 8 others (0.25%). At the 2021 census, the commune had a population of 3,110; of those, 83.18% were Romanians and 9.52% Tatars.

== Natives ==
- Yusuf Isa Halim (1894–1982), poet, schoolteacher, and linguist
