= Pecineaga =

- Commune
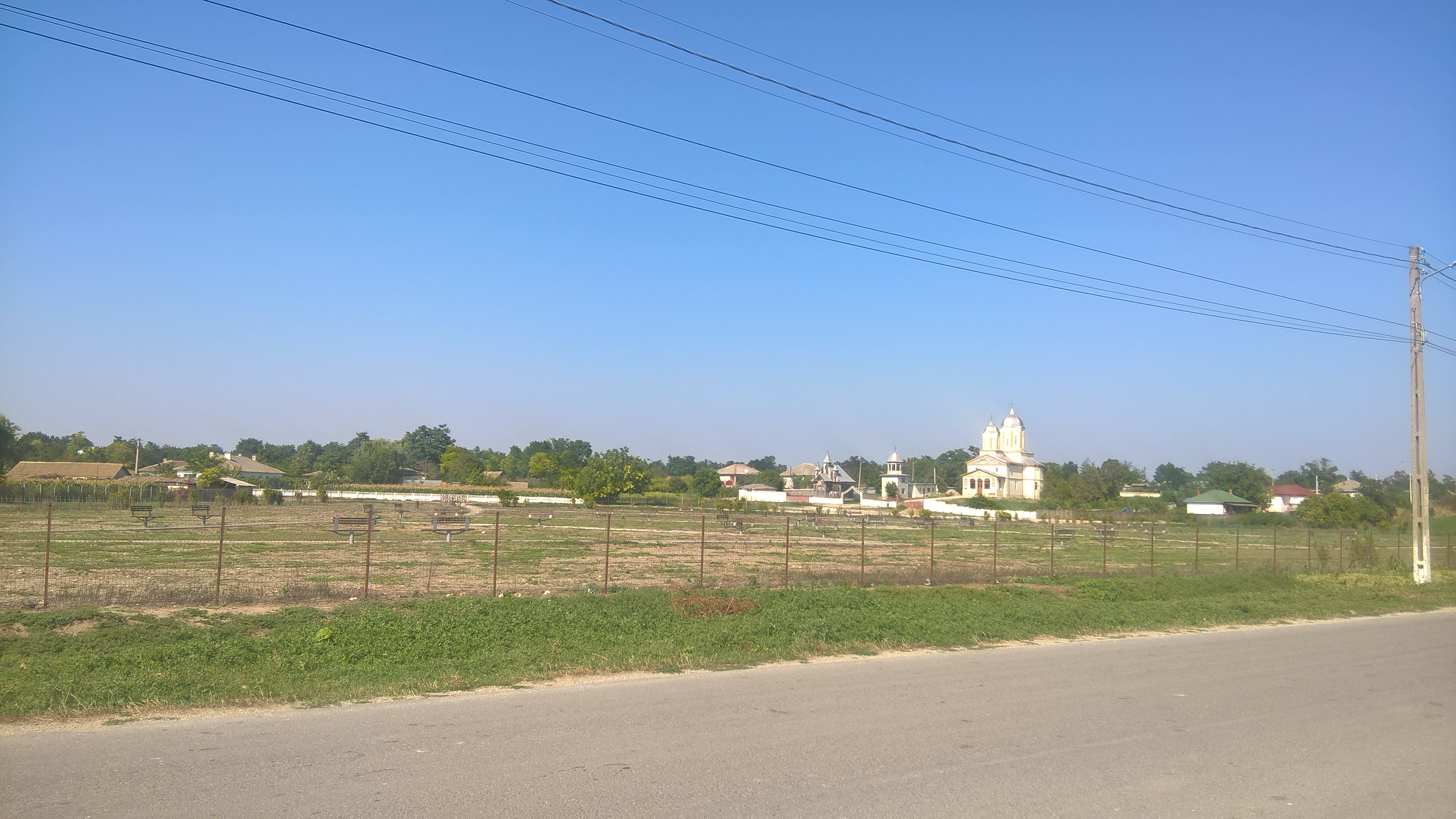

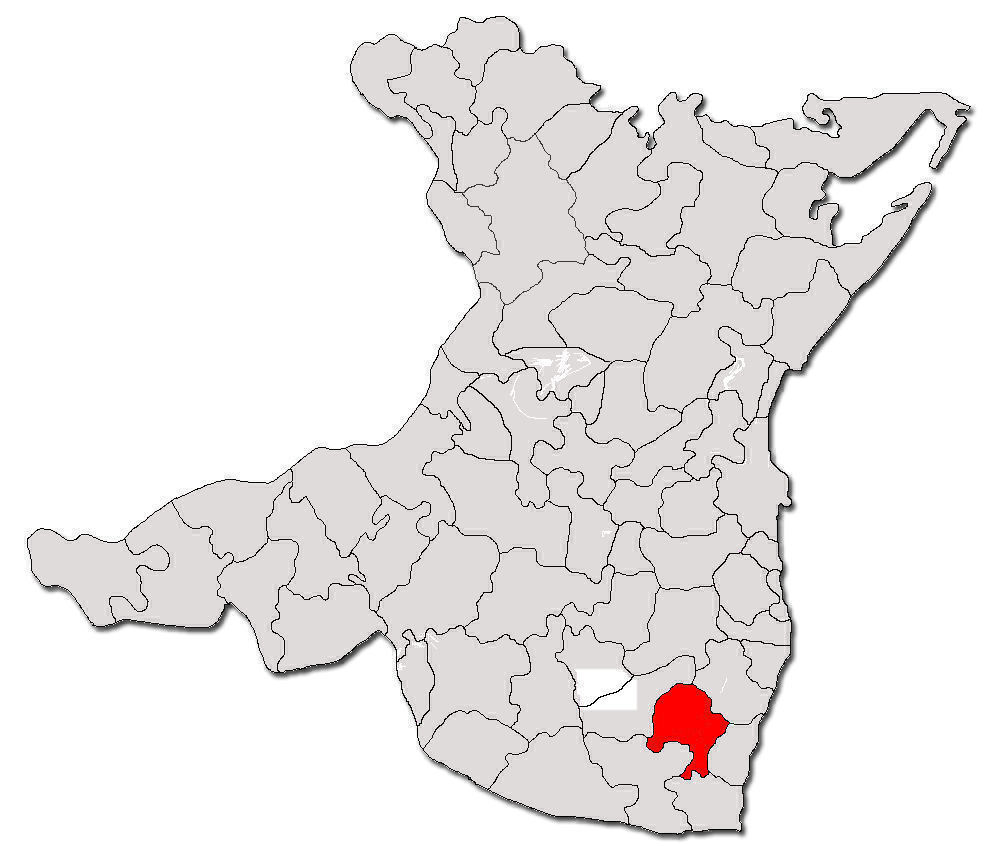
- Location in Constanța County

- Location in Romania
- Coordinates: 43°53′43″N 28°29′58″E
- Country: Romania
- County: Constanța
- Subdivisions: Pecineaga, Vânători

Government
  - Mayor (2020–2024): Niculae Stan (PSD)
- Area: 55.7 km^{2} (21.5 sq mi)
- Elevation: 46 m (151 ft)
- Population (2021-12-01): 3,187
  - Density: 57.2/km^{2} (148/sq mi)
- Time zone: UTC+02:00 (EET)
  - Summer (DST): UTC+03:00 (EEST)
- Postal code: 907235 (Pecineaga); 907236 (Vânători)
- Area code: +40 x41
- Vehicle reg.: CT
- Website: primaria-pecineaga.ro

Pecineaga (Romanian pronunciation: [pet͡ʃiˈne̯aga]) is a commune in Constanța County, Northern Dobruja, Romania. To the southeast of the commune lies the city of Mangalia.

== Administration ==
The commune includes two villages:

- Pecineaga (Turkish: Pecenek, old names: Gherengic until 1923, Turkish: Gerencik; I.G. Duca between 1933 and 1940)
- Vânători (historical names: Haidarchioi; Turkish: Aşçılar).

== Demographics ==
Historical population
Year	Pop.	±%
2002	3,063	—
2011	3,189	+4.1%
2021	3,187	−0.1%
Source: Census data

According to the 2002 census, the commune had a population 3,063, of which 97% were Romanians and the rest mostly Turks and Tatars. At the 2011 census, Pecineaga had 3,189 inhabitants, of which 92.35% were Romanians, 2.1% Turks, 1.41% Tatars, and 0.31% Roma. At the 2021 census, the commune had a population of 3,187; of those, 86.67% were Romanians and 1.19% Roma.

== History ==
The locality is named after the Pechenegs, a Turkic semi-nomadic people which settled in this place in the 10th/11th century. When founded, the village bore the name Gerencik. It was colonized successively by Crimean Tatars (1857), Transylvanian shepherds (Mocani) (after 1878), ploughers from Brăila County (1885) and Râmnicu Sărat. From 1933 until 1940 the village was named Ion Gheorghe Duca, after the prime minister assassinated in 1933 by an Iron Guard death squad.

== Natives ==
- Mehmet Niyazi (1878–1931), poet, journalist, schoolteacher, academic, and activist
