= Mehmet Niyazi =

Romanian writer and academic of Crimean Tatar ethnicity (1878 - 1931)

Memet Niyaziy Ğemaliy Mehmet Niyazi Cemali
- Born: January or February 1878; Asçîlar/Vânători, Danube Vilayet, Ottoman Empire
- Died: November 20, 1931 (aged 53); Medğidiye/Medgidia, Kingdom of Romania
- Occupations: Poet, journalist, schoolteacher, academic, activist
- Spouse: Şefika (Sapiye) Abdulakim
- Relatives: Kázím Abdulakim (brother-in-law); Selim Abdulakim (brother-in-law)
- Writing career
- Language: Crimean Tatar
- Period: 20th century

Mehmet Niyazi Cemali (Dobrujan Tatar: Memet Niyaziy Ğemaliy; Crimean Tatar: Memet Niyaziy; January or February 1878 – November 20, 1931) was an Ottoman-born Romanian and Crimean Tatar poet, journalist, schoolteacher, academic, and activist for ethnic Tatar causes. Present for part of his life in the Russian Empire and Crimea-proper, he wrote most of his works in Crimean Tatar and Ottoman Turkish. Niyazi is credited with having played a major part in keeping alive the connection between the Crimean Tatar diaspora and their land of origin, and is best known for his lyrical works depicting Crimea (The Green Island and The Green Homeland).

== Biography ==
Born into a Muslim family of Crimean refugees in the village of Aşçılar, Northern Dobruja, he was the second son of Ismail and Azize, two literate peasants and Ottoman subjects. Niyazi's birth coincided with the Russo-Turkish War of 1877–1878, which ended in the region's annexation by the Kingdom of Romania. He familiarized himself with Tatar literature and folklore during his childhood, and was taught Ottoman Turkish by his father, before completing his primary education in Aşçılar. It was probably during his teenage years that he first began authoring his series of literary pieces, which, overall, were noted for their reliance on elements of the Ottoman vocabulary.

In 1889, the family left Romania for the Ottoman capital of Istanbul, where Mehmet was enrolled in normal school. In subsequent years, he became influenced by the creations of Namık Kemal and Abdullah Hamit, as well as achieving fluency in French, Arabic and Persian. In 1898 and 1899, he attempted to settle in Russian-ruled Crimea and start a career as a schoolteacher, but was expelled by the government on both occasions.

After his father's death in 1904, Niyazi returned to Romania and joined the Tatar community in Constanţa. He married Sefika Abdulakim (also known as Sapiye); she was the sister of Kázím Abdulakim (a Romanian Army officer and World War I hero) and of the politician Selim Abdulakim. The couple had four daughters and two sons (two of their children died in their teens).

Niyazi was appointed a teacher at the local Tatar school in 1906, lecturing in Ottoman History, Ottoman Language, Poetry and Prose, Persian Literature, and Kalam. He served as the institution's headmaster between 1910 and 1914, settling with his family in Medgidia after 1916, when he was appointed headmaster of the Islamic Seminary in that town. In 1909, he began editing the journal Dobruca, which was printed in Istanbul by the Kader publishing house. Other short-lived publications he started during the period include Tesvik, Mektep ve Aile, and, with Cevdet Kemal, Isik.

In early 1918, when the Qurultay proclaimed a Crimean People's Republic in the wake of the October Revolution and upon the close of World War I, Niyazi left for Simferopol (Aqmescit), where he joined Tatar activists in their campaign, edited the Hak Ses newspaper, and for a while was employed by the Crimean Ministry of Education. When the Bolshevik Red Army troops entered Crimea (see Crimean Autonomous Soviet Socialist Republic), he took refuge in Romania. From that moment on, Mehmet Niyazi concentrated on literary activities, entering the most prolific phase of his career. He published his works in the Arabic alphabet version of Crimean Tatar. As a community leader, he was an influence on a new wave of Crimean refugees who sought inspiration in the Second Polish Republic's Prometheist policies.

Suffering from tuberculosis, he died as a result of the disease, having his last years clouded by the death of his wife Sefika. He was buried in Medgidia, with a ceremony that attracted a large crowd of his admirers. His large-scale grave (mezar) was argued to have been the first modern one to bear the tamgha present on the Crimean Khanate's flag (see Giray dynasty). The location endured as a rallying point for the Tatar community.
