= Sîdîyîk Ibrahim H. Mîrzî =

Sîdîyîk Ibrahim H. Mîrzî Sadîc Ibraim
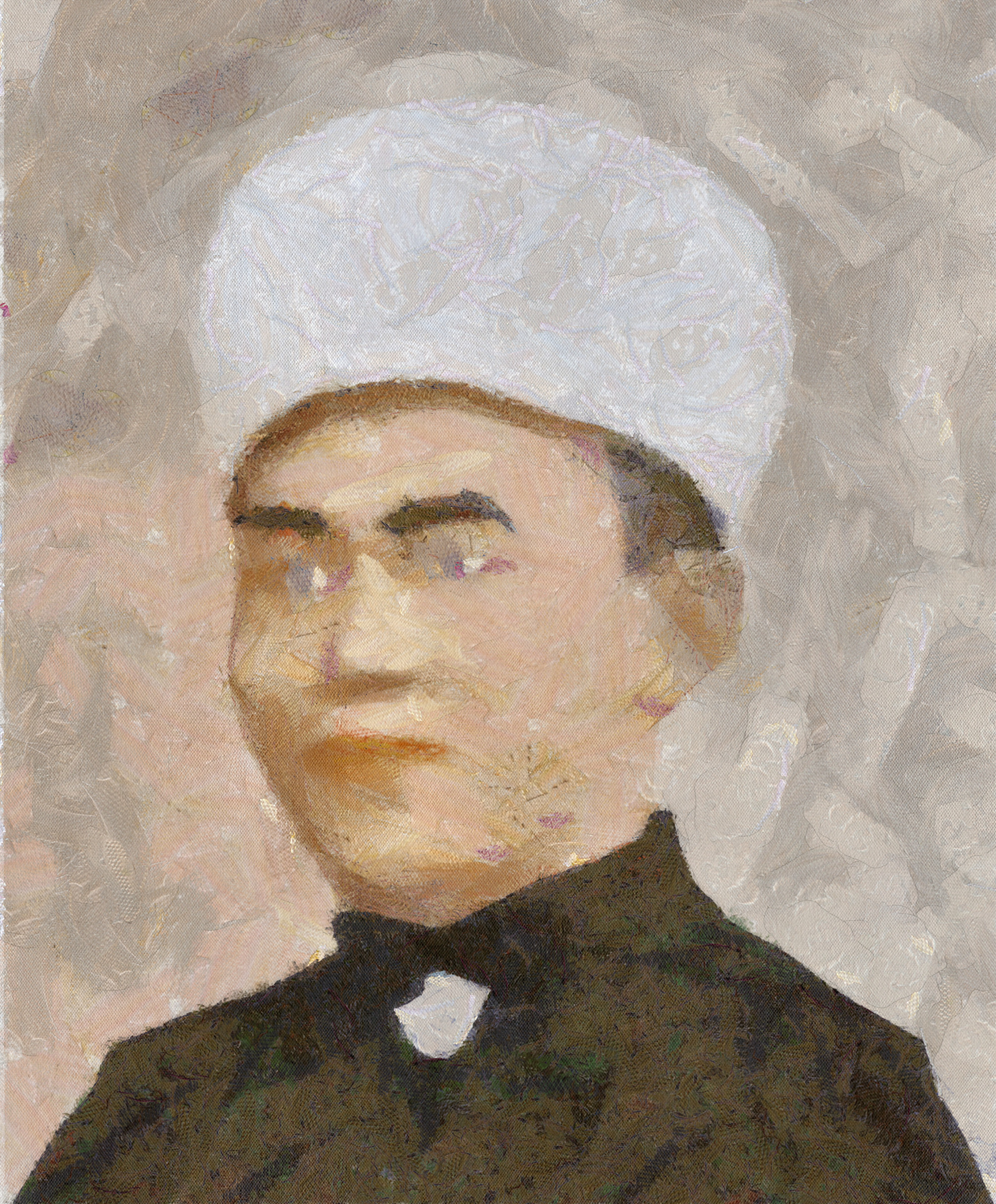
- Born: 1909; Kíşke Tatlîğak/Dulcești, Constanța County, Romania
- Died: 1959 (aged 49–50); Pitești, Romanian People's Republic
- Resting place: Muslim Central Cemetery, Constanța; 44.173435°N 28.621952°E
- Occupation: Mufti of Constanța County
- Years active: 1943-1945
- Predecessor: Kurt-Amet Mustafa
- Successor: Reşit Seit-Veli

Sîdîyîk Ibrahim H. Mîrzî (known in Romanian as Sadîc Ibraim) (1909 – 1959) was a Crimean Tatar spiritual leader, imam, Mufti of the Muslim community of Romania, and activist for ethnic Tatar causes.

== Biography ==
Sîdîyîk was born in 1909, to Ibrahim Hağî Mîrzî (1881-1960) and Zebide (1888-1968) in Kíşke Tatlîğak, known today as Dulcești, a village situated in the Tatar countryside west of Mangalia.

He served as Mufti of Constanța County between 1943 and 1945. He was preceded by Kurt-Amet Mustafa and succeeded by Reşit Seit-Veli.

In 1945, he was arrested and investigated facing charges of traveling to Crimea sent by the Gestapo to foster the separation of Crimea from the Soviet Union, creating in Romania nests of Crimean Tatars aimed at defaming in the highest degree the Soviet state and its army, helping the Germans to recruit Crimean Tatars charged of being Soviet patriots who were taken to Germany and whose existence is unknown.

Sîdîyîk died in 1959, aged 49 or 50, in Pitești Prison. He was buried at the Muslim Central Cemetery, in Constanța.

== See also ==
- Islam in Romania
- Crimean Tatars
- List of Crimean Tatars

== Sources ==
- Ioanid, Ion (2013). Închisoarea noastră cea de toate zilele, Vol.3 (in Romanian). Vol. 3. Constanța: Humanitas. p. 492. ISBN 978-973-50-4206-6.
- Akmolla, Güner (2011). Tătarii (in Romanian). Vol. 2. Constanța: Editura Boldaș. pp. 161–162. ISBN 9786068066325.
- Lascu, Stoica (24 September 2013), "Turco-tătarii dobrogeni în lumina unor mărturii arhivistice constănțene (1885-1948)", in Tasin Gemil; Gabriel Custurea; Delia Roxana Cornea (eds.), Simpozionul Internațional: Moștenirea culturală turcă în Dobrogea (in Romanian), Constanța: Muzeul de Istorie Națională și Arheologie
- "Rezistența anticomunistă din Dobrogea". Executați-morți în detenție din Dobrogea (in Romanian). Rezistența anticomunistă.
