= Negiat Sali =

Romanian politician (born 1953)

Negiat Sali (Dobrujan Tatar: Neğat Saliy; born September 4, 1953) is a Romanian economist and politician of Tatar origin, a member of the Democratic Union of Turco-Islamic Tatars of Romania (UDTTMR) and former member of the Chamber of Deputies in 2000–2004.

== Biography ==
A Muslim member of the Tatar minority and graduate of the Bucharest Academy of Economic Studies, Faculty of Finance and Accounting, he was first employed as a construction worker before the fall of the Communist regime, present on the building site of the Danube-Black Sea Canal in 1980–1982. From 1982 until 2000, he worked at the Murfatlar Vineyard research station.

In 1990, after the Romanian Revolution, Sali was among the founding members of the UDTTMR. He became the Union's vice president the following year (serving until 1993), and its president in 1997 (ending his mandate in 2000). Elected to the Chamber for Constanța County during the 2000 suffrage, he sat with the Ethnic Minority group, and served on the Committee for Budget, Finance and Banks, and on the Committee for Regulation. In late 2001, following the September 11, 2001 attacks on New York City, he contended that Islamic fundamentalist groupings had attempted to infiltrate the UDTTMR and the Romanian Tatar community at large, but that the Union had rejected all collaboration. In his view, this information was reflected in reports presented by the Intelligence Service).

Negiat Sali is noted for his views in respect to the total number of Tatars in Romania, arguing that the community is subject to under-counting, due to the alleged tendency of its members to declare Romanian ethnicity in censuses. According to Sali, this practice has reduced the number of Tatars from approx. 70,000 to approx. 55,000 people.
