= Kázím Abdulakim =

Romanian Crimean Tatar soldier

- Kiazim Abdulakim; Kiazim Abdulachim; Chiazim Abdulachim
- Died: 1917; Battle of Mărășești, Romania
- Relatives: Selim Abdulakim (brother); Șefika Niyaziy, also known as Sapiye (sister); Memet Niyaziy (brother-in-law)
- Military career
- Allegiance: Romanian Army
- Rank: Second Lieutenant
- Conflicts: Battle of Mărășești

Kázím Abdulakim (also transliterated in Romanian as: Kiazim Abdulachim, Kiazim Abdulakim or Chiazim Abdulachim) was a Crimean Tatar hero of the Romanian Army who lost his life in the summer of 1917 during the Battle of Mărășești during World War I.

Second Lieutenant Kázím Abdulakim was the brother of lawyer Selim Abdulakim who, between the two wars, became a leading politician of the Crimean Tatars in Romania, Deputy Mayor of Constanța and a Member of the Romanian Parliament. Kázím's sister Șefika, also known as Sapiye, was the wife of the beloved Crimean Tatar poet Memet Niyaziy.

As recognition of his extreme devotion to duty and his ultimate sacrifice, in Dobruja the Second Lieutenant Kázím Abdulakim Cultural and Sports Association was founded, and a street in downtown Constanța was named in Kázím's honor.

== See also ==
- Selim Abdulakim
- Memet Niyaziy
- Refiyîk Kadír

== Sources ==
- Agi-Amet, Gemal (1999). Dicţionarul personalităţilor turco-tătare din România (in Romanian). Constanta: Metafora. ISBN 9789739340274.
- Scurtu, Costin (2011). "Comunitatea turco-tãtarã din Dobrogea în armatã". Tara Barsei (in Romanian). 2011 (10): 95.
- Romania Libera (24 March 2007). "Tragedia tatarilor crimeeni si a sprijinitorilor lor din Romania" (in Romanian). Romania Libera. Romania Libera.
- Scurtu, Costin (24 September 2013). "Contribuţii la păstrarea tradiţiilor musulmane dobrogene în armata română". Lucrările Simpozionului internațional: Moştenirea culturală turcă în Dobrogea, Muzeul de Istorie Națională şi Arheologie, Constanța by Tasin Gemil, Gabriel Custurea, Delia Roxana Cornea (in Romanian). 1 (1).
- "Street Slt. Kiazim Abduachim". Google Maps.
- Strazi si bulevarde din Romania. "Strada Kizim Abdulachim (Sublocotenent)". Strazi si bulevarde din Romania.
