= Bărăganu =

- Commune
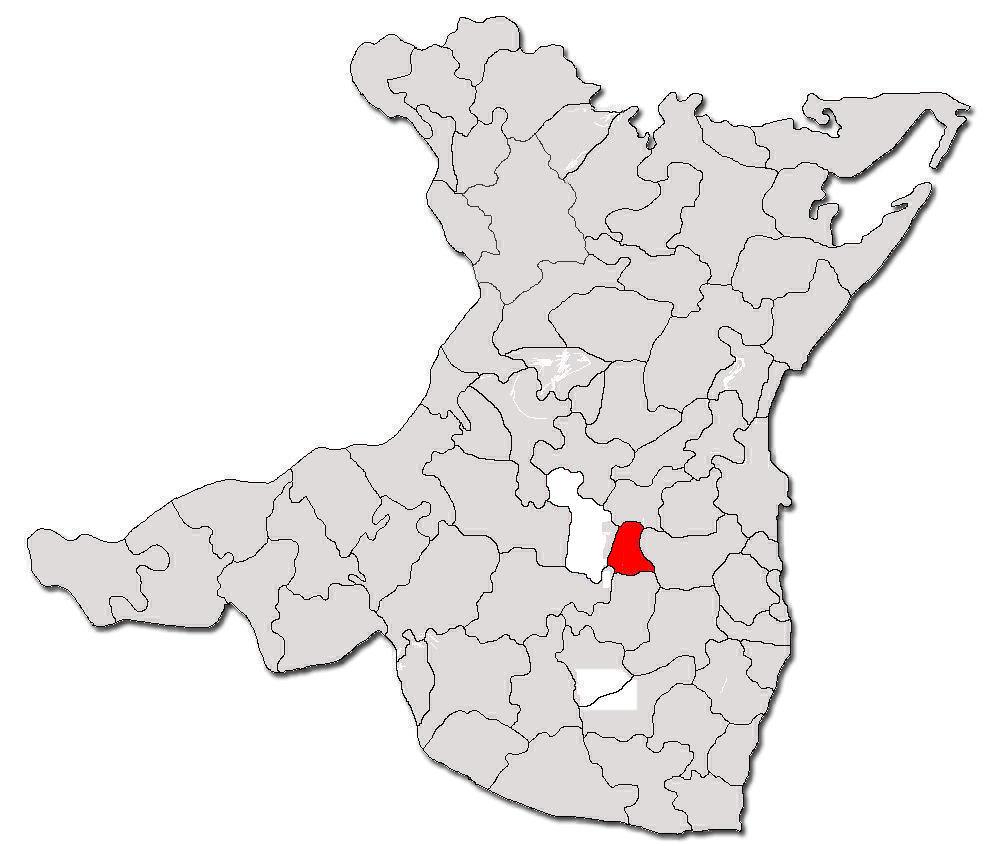
- Location in Constanța County

- Location in Romania
- Coordinates: 44°5′23″N 28°25′22″E
- Country: Romania
- County: Constanța
- Subdivisions: Bărăganu, Lanurile

Government
  - Mayor (2020–2024): Magdalena Neague (PSD)
- Area: 43.96 km^{2} (16.97 sq mi)
- Population (2021-12-01): 1,916
  - Density: 44/km^{2} (110/sq mi)
- Time zone: EET/EEST (UTC+2/+3)
- Vehicle reg.: CT
- Website: www.primariabaraganu.ro

Bărăganu (Romanian pronunciation: [bərəˈɡanu]) is a commune in Constanța County, Northern Dobruja, Romania. The commune includes two villages:

- Bărăganu (historical name: Osmanfacâ, Turkish: Osmanfakı) - named after the Bărăgan Plain
- Lanurile (historical name: Ebechioi, Turkish: Ebeköyü)

== Demographics ==
At the 2011 census, Bărăganu had 1,850 Romanians (97.21%), 7 Roma (0.37%), 4 Germans (0.21%), 4 Turks (0.21%), 19 Tatars (1.00%), 19 others (1.00%).
