= Comana, Constanța =

Comana
- Commune
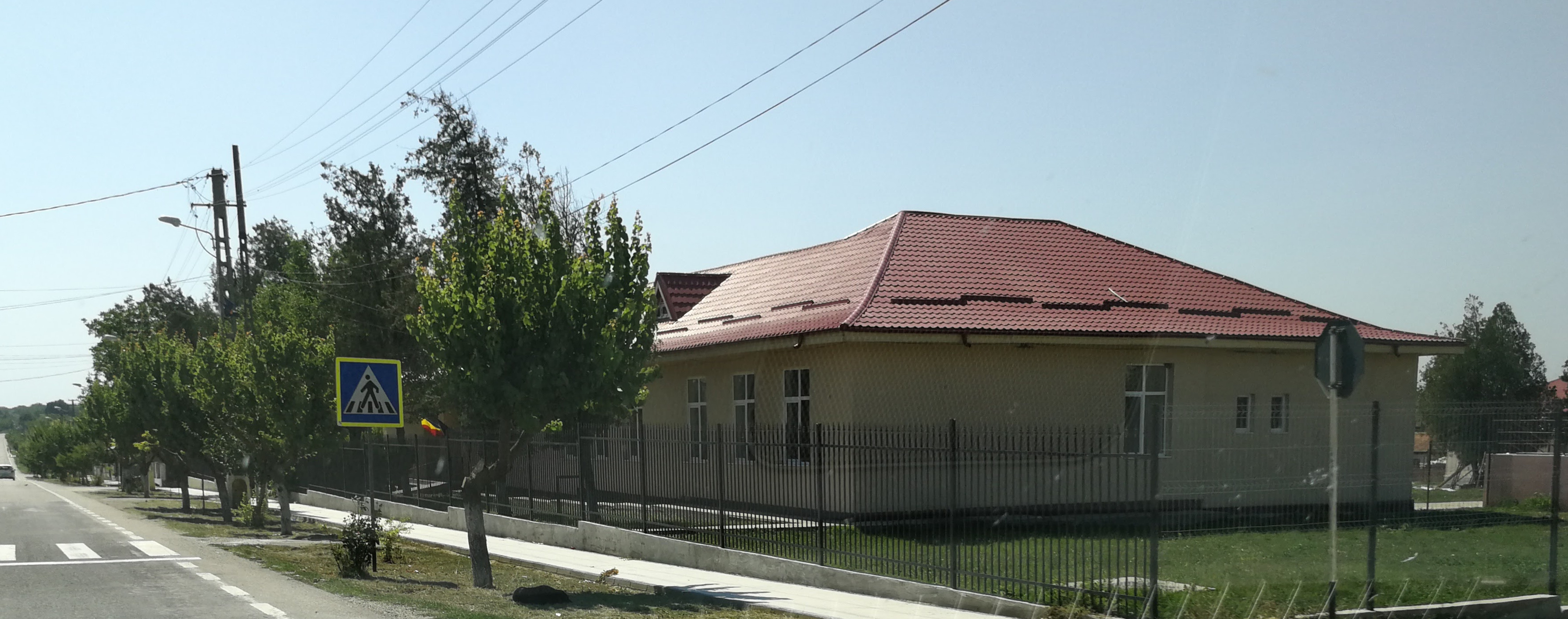
- Comana village

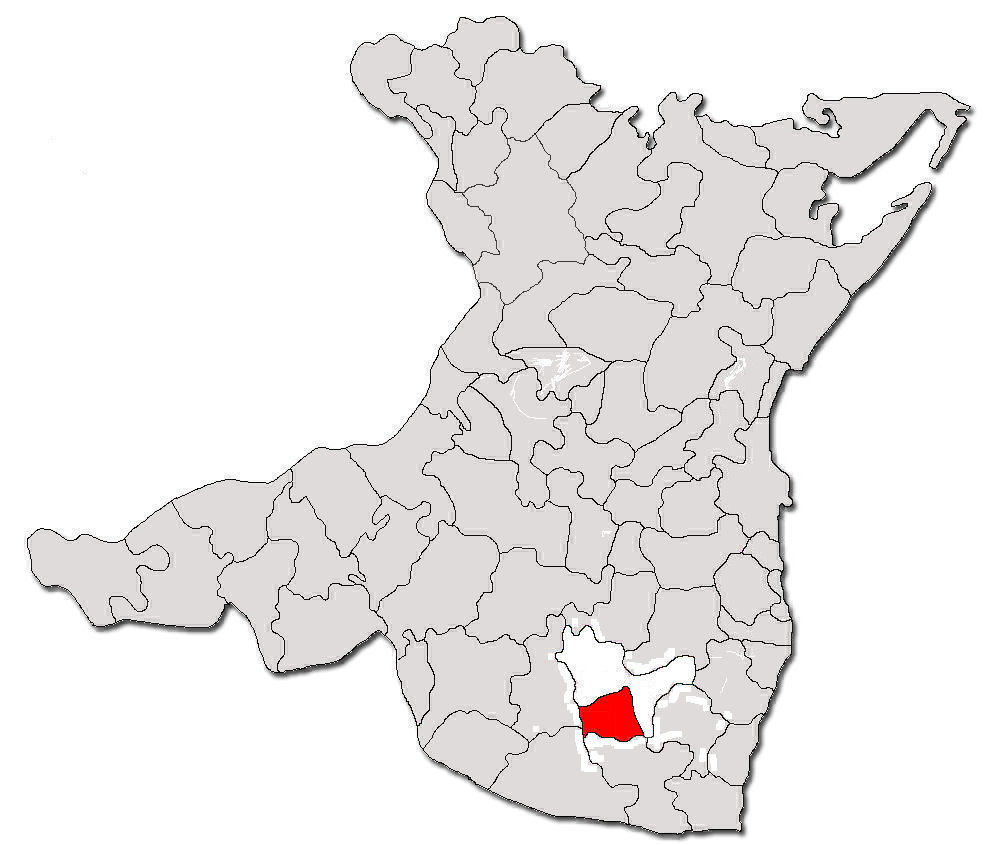
- Location in Constanța County

- Location in Romania
- Coordinates: 43°54′N 28°19′E
- Country: Romania
- County: Constanța
- Subdivisions: Comana, Tătaru, Pelinu

Government
  - Mayor (2020–2024): Ion Adam (PNL)
- Area: 61.46 km^{2} (23.73 sq mi)
- Elevation: 95 m (312 ft)
- Population (2021-12-01): 1,639
  - Density: 26.67/km^{2} (69.07/sq mi)
- Time zone: UTC+02:00 (EET)
  - Summer (DST): UTC+03:00 (EEST)
- Postal code: 907080
- Area code: +(40) x41
- Vehicle reg.: CT
- Website: www.primaria-comana.ro

Comana (Romanian pronunciation: [koˈmana]) is a commune in Constanța County, Northern Dobruja, Romania.

The commune includes three villages:

- Comana (historical name: Mustafa Agi, Turkish: Mustafa Hacı)
- Tătaru (historical name: Azaplar)
- Pelinu (historical name: Carachioi, Turkish: Karaköy)

The former village of Orzari (historical name: Erebiler) was merged with the village of Comana by the 1968 administrative reform.

== Geography ==
The commune is located in the southern part of Constanța County, 45 km (28 mi) southwest on the county seat, Constanța. It is crossed by national road DN38 (part of European route E675), which connects Constanța with the nearby town of Negru Vodă, on the Bulgaria–Romania border.

== Demographics ==
At the 2011 census, Comana had 1,804 inhabitants; of those, 1,543 were Romanians (89.50%), 161 Tatars (9.34%), 17 Turks (0.99%), and 3 others (0.17%). At the 2021 census, the commune had a population of 1,639, of which 84% were Romanians, 6% Tatars, and 1.1% Turks.

== Natives ==
- Şahip Bolat Abdurrahim from Azaplar/Tătaru, Mufti of Constanța County (1933–1937)
- Septar Mehmet Yakub from Azaplar/Tătaru, Mufti of Romania (1947–1990)
