= Emin Bektöre =

Crimean Tatar writer

Emin Bektöre Emin Bektóre
- Born: 1906; Dobrich, Southern Dobruja, Principality of Bulgaria
- Died: 15 April 1995 (aged 88–89); Turkey
- Occupations: Folklorist, ethnographer, lyricist, activist
- Writing career
- Language: Crimean Tatar
- Period: 20th century
- Notable awards: Halk Oyunlari Hizmet Ödülü - 1990 by Galatasaray Eğitim Vakfi, Zirvedekiler 90 by Öner Journal

Emin Bektöre (also transliterated as Bektóre; 1906 – 15 April 1995) was a Dobrujan-born Dobrujan Tatar folklorist, ethnographer, lyricist, and activist for ethnic Dobrujan Tatar causes.

== Biography ==
Emin was born in Dobrich in the region of Dobruja. At the time, the town was part of the Principality of Bulgaria; from 1913 to 1940, it was in Romanian possession and named Bazargic. He received his primary and secondary schooling in Romania, in Bazargic and Bucharest. Since his early youth he was interested in folklore joining Romanian and Bulgarian folk groups. Then he organized several Crimean Tatar folk ensembles and wrote and staged such didactic plays as Şahin Giray Han, Atilla, Bora, Kîrîm, Kök-köz Bayar. In 1930, in Constanta, he joined the group led by Müstecib Ülküsal founding the Crimean Tatar journal Emel.

Bektöre immigrated to Turkey in 1940 and settled in Eskişehir carrying out significant work for Tatars folk culture. There he continued teaching and counseling folklore. He was a forerunner and developer of ethnography and folklore initiatives in Turkey. Thanks to his activities Crimean Tatar folk dance and music have been included in the educational curriculum in the province of Eskişehir.

He campaigned for national Tatar causes. In the sixties he met again, this time in Turkey, Müstecib Ülküsal and other leading Crimean Tatar activists such as Cafer Seydamet Qırımer and Edige Kirimal restarting his contribution to Emel, Turkish series.

He died on 15 April 1995.
