= Şahip Bolat Abdurrahim =

Şahip Bolat Abdurrahim Şaip Bolat Abduraim
- Born: November 29, 1893; Tătaru, Constanța County, Kingdom of Romania
- Died: October 31, 1978 (aged 84); Constanța, Constanța County, Socialist Republic of Romania
- Resting place: Constanța Muslim Central Cemetery; 44.173102°N 28.622218°E
- Occupations: Mufti of Constanța County, Romania
- Years active: 1933–1937
- Predecessor: Resul Nuriy
- Successor: Sadîk Bolat Septar
- Spouse: Fewziye (21 October 1902–7 November 1979)

Şahip Bolat Abdurrahim (known in Romanian as Şaip Bolat Abduraim) (1893-1978) was a Crimean Tatar spiritual leader, Mufti of the Muslim community of Constanța County.

== Biography ==
Şahip was born on 29 November 1893 in Azaplar, situated in the Tatar countryside west of Mangalia, a village known today by its official name Tătaru (part of Comana commune). He was married to Fewziye Bolat Abdurrahim and he served as Mufti of Constanța County between 1933 and 1937. He was preceded by Resul Nuriy and succeeded by Sadîk Bolat Septar.

Şahip died on 31 October 1978 in Constanța. He is resting near his wife in Constanta Muslim Central Cemetery at: 44.173102, 28.622218.

== See also ==
- Islam in Romania
- Crimean Tatars
- List of Crimean Tatars

== Sources ==
- blogspot.ro. "Muftiul buclucas". murat-iusuf.blogspot.ro (in Romanian). blogspot.ro.
