= Mustafa Edige Kirimal =

Crimean politician and Tatar activist (1911-1980)

- Mustafa Edige Qırımal
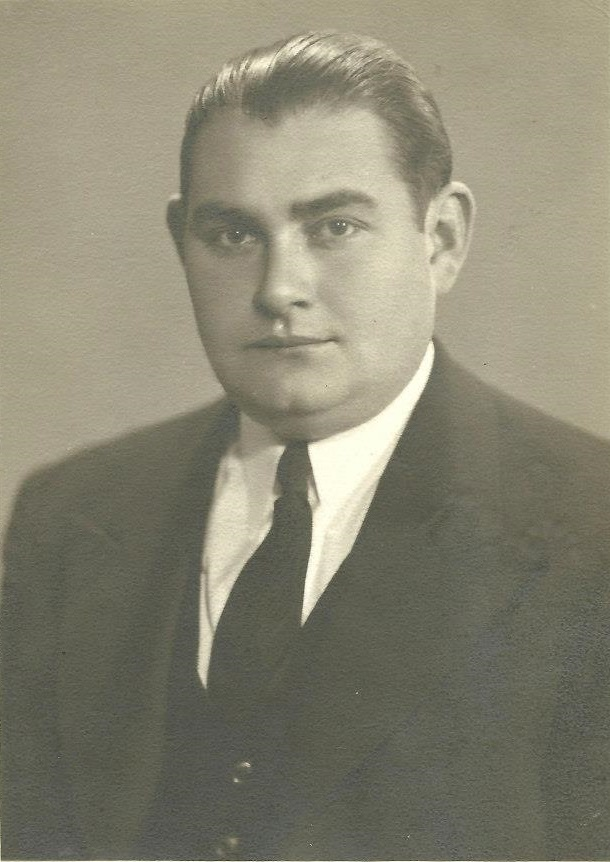

Personal details
- Born: 1911 Bakhchysarai, Russian Empire (now Ukraine)
- Died: June 22, 1980 (aged 68–69) Munich, Germany
- Resting place: Zincirli Madrasa

Mustafa Edige Kirimal (birth name Edige Szynkiewicz; 1911 in Bakhchysarai – 22 April 1980 in Munich) was a Crimean-born Lipka-Tatar politician.

Kirimal is best known for his meticulous research and publications on the history of Crimean Tatars in the first half of the 20th century. He served as the editor of Dergi, one of the publications of the Institute for the Study of the USSR in Munich, and was among the first scholars to explore the fate of ethnic minorities living in the Soviet Union.

== Early life ==
Edige's father Mustafa Shinkievich, who was descended from a Lipka Tatar family, had moved to Crimea before World War I. He was a descendant of soldiers under the command of the Golden Horde Khan Toktamish who had fled to Lithuania in the late 14th century.

Born in Bahçesaray in 1911, Edige received his early education in Dereköy, near Yalta and graduated from the Russian gymnasium in Yalta. He enrolled in the Institute of Pedagogy in Simferopol, now the Crimea State Medical University, but his involvement in Crimean Tatar nationalist activities made it impossible for him to remain in Crimea.

== Exile ==
The Soviet repression, marked by the arrest, execution and deportation of thousands of Tatars, forced Edige to flee to Azerbaijan and then to Iran. He arrived in Istanbul in 1932. Two years later, he joined his uncle Yakup Shinkievich, who was serving in Vilnius, a city then under Polish rule. Edige graduated from the University of Vilnius with a degree in political science in 1939. Following the invasion of Poland by German forces in September 1939, he left for Berlin and then for Istanbul. During the German occupation of Ukraine and Crimea (1941–44), Kirimal was active in Germany, trying to secure rights and protection for the Crimean Tatars, and later helped refugees from Crimea settle in German camps. Gerhard von Mende gave him the title "President of the Crimean Tatar National Central Committee".

== After World War ==
After World War II ended, Kirimal pursued his graduate studies and received his doctorate degree from the University of Münster in Germany. His often quoted monograph, 'Der Nationale Kampf der Krim-türken - The National Struggle of the Crimean Tatars' (Emsdetten/Westfalen, 1952), was based on his dissertation. He joined the staff of the newly founded Institute for the Study of the USSR (Institut zur Erforschung de UdSSR) in Munich in 1954 and became the editor of "Dergi", the Institute's publication in Turkish. Kirimal published numerous articles on the history of Crimean Tatars under Russian and Soviet rule.

He was fluent in Turkish, Polish and German. He retired in 1972 when the Institute closed, and died in 1980 in Munich, where he was living in exile. His body was transported from Munich to Simferopol via Istanbul in 2007, 27 years later.
