= Mende =

Mende may refer to:

== Ethnic group ==
- Mende people
- Mende language
- Seim language, also called Mende language
- Mende syllabary (Kikakui)

== People ==
- Mende (surname)
- Mende Nazer (born c.1982), Sudanese-British author and human rights activist

== Places ==
- various geographic designations in the department of Lozère, France:
  - Arrondissement of Mende
  - Mende, Lozère
  - Roman Catholic Diocese of Mende
- Mende (Chalcidice), a city in ancient Greece
- Mende, Hungary, a village in Pest county
- Mount Mende, Antarctica
