= Mende (surname) =

Mende is a surname. Notable people with the surname include:

- Clara Mende (1869–1947), German politician
- Dirk-Ulrich Mende (born 1957), German politician and Lord Mayor of the town of Celle, Germany
- Erich Mende (1916–1998), German politician
- Erling von Mende (born 1940), German sinologist
- Gerhard von Mende (1904–1963), German academic, administrator under the Nazi regime
- Gunther Mende (born 1952), German record producer
- Hildegard Mende (born 1922), German concentration camp guard during World War II
- Kaoru Mende (born 1950), Japanese lighting designer
- Septi Mende (born 1986), Indonesian tennis player
- Sven Mende (born 1994), German footballer
