= Tepe-Kermen =

Mountain in Ukraine

- Töpe Kermen
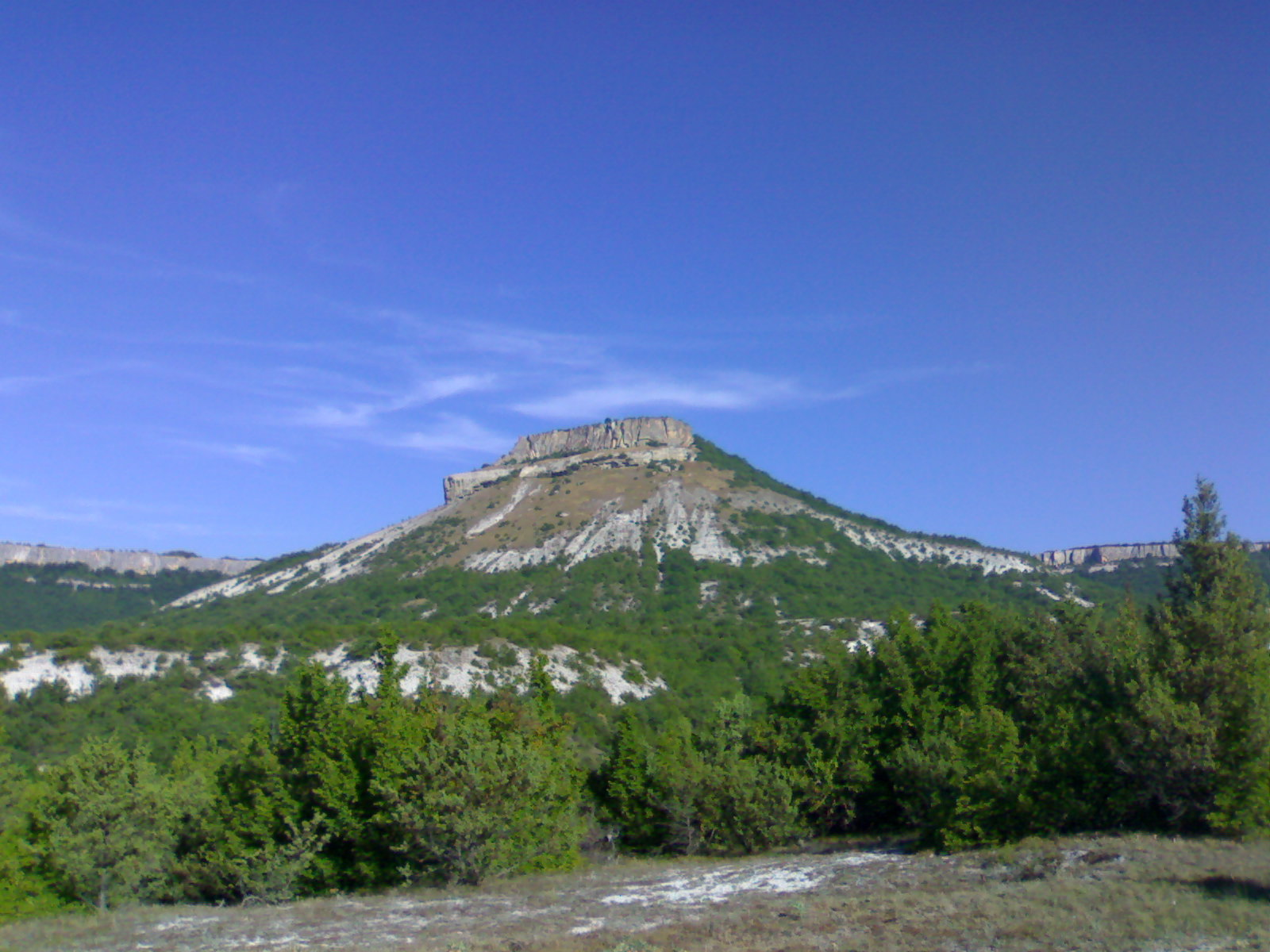
- The highest point

Highest point
- Elevation: 540 m (1,770 ft)
- Coordinates: 44°43′02″N 33°55′48″E

Geography
- Location: Russia/Ukraine
- Parent range: Crimean Mountains

Immovable Monument of National Significance of Ukraine
- Official name: Печерна церква “Тепе-Кермен” (Cave church of Tepe-Kermen)
- Type: Architecture
- Reference no.: 010090

Tepe-Kermen (Crimean Tatar: Töpe Kermen; Ukrainian and Russian: Тепе-Кермен) is a butte and an archeological site of an early medieval fortified settlement in the Bakhchysarai Raion of Crimea. It is located seven km southeast of Bakhchysarai, and two km northeast of the Kyz-Kermen hillfort. Its height is 544 meters. The easiest way to climb the mountain is from the northern slope. There are two paths leading to the top.

== Settlement ==
The name Tepe-Kermen is of Turkic origin: in Crimean Tatar it means "hill-fortress" or "fortress on the top" (töpe - hill, peak, kermen - fortress). The same name is given to the remains of the medieval city-fortress (according to other sources - a monastery) Tepe-Kermen, which covers the upper part of the mountain in several levels. Its area is about one hectare.

In fact, it was not a settlement but a fortified castle, where the local population used to hide from enemy forces. This explains the lack of water sources.

According to some available sources, the unfortified settlement appeared in the 5th-6th century, and the construction of the fortress, based on some indirect signs, probably occurred in the second half of the 5th - early 6th century, or late 6th - early 7th century, under the guidance of the Byzantine administration of Chersonesus. It is believed that from the second half of the 7th century there was the residence of the Archon, who was part of the governing authorities of the Dori region (the administrative center of the Military-Administrative District), and in the 8th-9th century Tepe-Kermen, with its main temple-basilica, was a kind of ecclesiastical center of the district.

In 12th-13th centuries, it reached its greatest prosperity. More than 230 man-made caves were concentrated there. There were traces of foundations among the bushes and grass. The walls have not survived. Some versions attribute the demise of the city to the raid of the Golden Horde Beylerbey Nogai in 1299.

== A baptistery church ==
In the western part of Tepe-Kermen there is a baptistery church inside the cave. In his fundamental work "Byzantine Kherson (second half of 6th - first half of 10th century)" from 2005, S.B. Sorochan, based on the researches of N.E. Gaidukov, believes that, "according to the expressive features of the liturgical structure", the church could have been built in the 6th-7th century.

The local Christians in the 18th century called the described building "the Temple of Saints Constantine and Helen" according to A.L. Berthier-Delagard in the "Collection of Manuscripts of Archbishop Gabriel".

The church is an object of cultural heritage of Russia of federal significance and also an object of cultural heritage of Ukraine.

Its dimensions are relatively large, as for Crimean cave temples of this type. The length is a little more than ten meters, the width is five meters, but it varies slightly due to the curvature of the inner walls. In this trapezoidal temple there was a cross-shaped baptismal font with two steps leading down. There are two tombs in the floor next to it and a bench along the southern wall.

In the main part of the temple in the western wall there was also a tomb with an inscription above it: "This tomb was dug at my request by Polit...om. The extension (was made) by the servant of God, the pious Manuel...".Another tomb is located south of the altar. The altar itself was separated by an altar wall carved into the rock and decorated with relief crosses. There are also three columns with capitals (in ancient times there were six) resting on the altar wall. In the floor of the altar you can see the niche for the throne. In the northern wall there is an altar with a niche in it. The purpose of the columns is to divide the cella into three naves: right (male), middle (clergy) and left (female), which is typical of Byzantine basilica temple art. The columns had only decorative value - there was no need to support the ceiling because it was a cave temple. The graceful ornamentation on the capitals has been preserved.

Next to the church on the plateau's edge, nine tombs and five sepulchres were excavated.

== Gallery ==
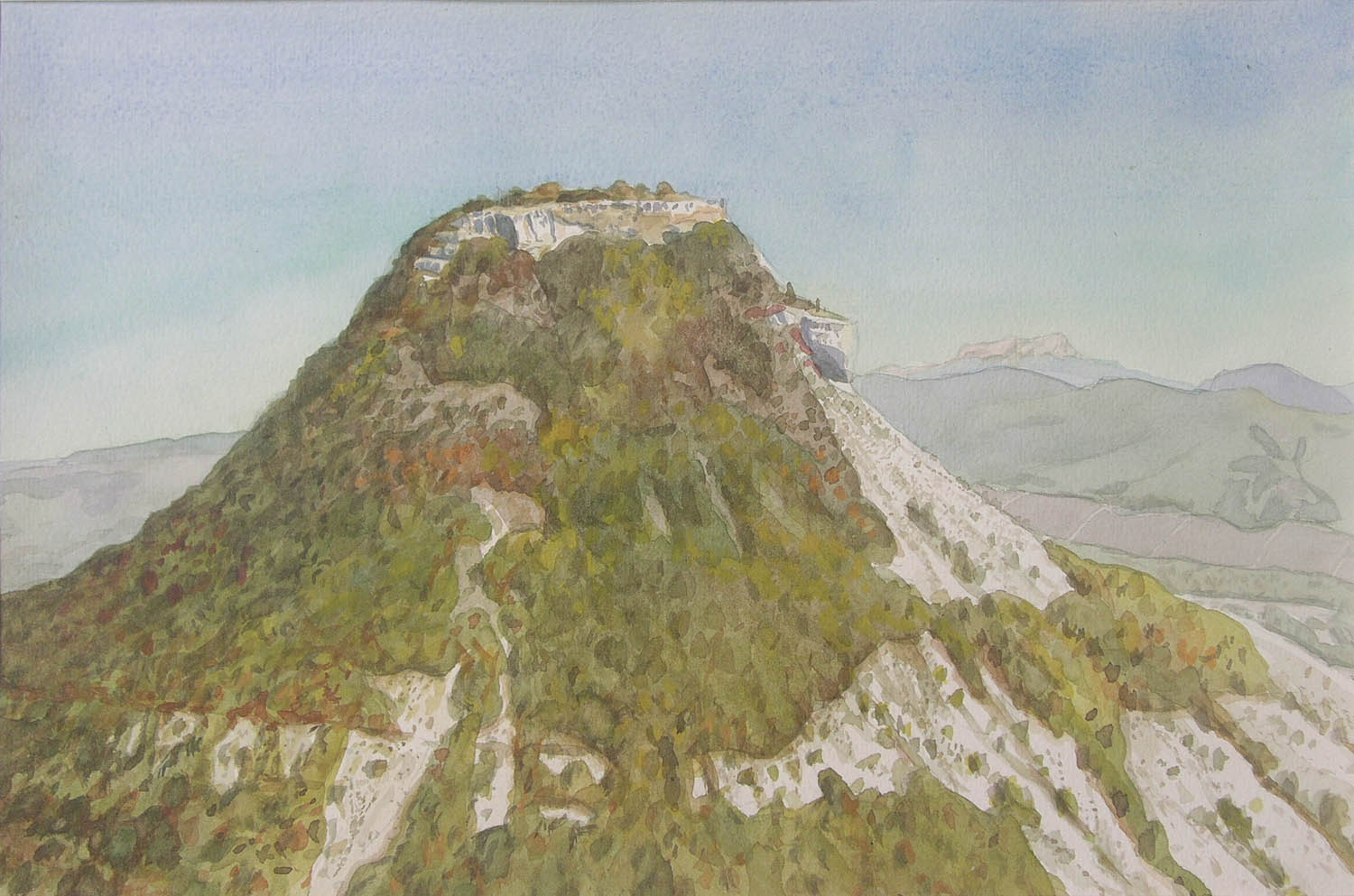
M. Presnyakov. Mesa with the cave settlement of Tepe-Kermen in the upper part (2006)

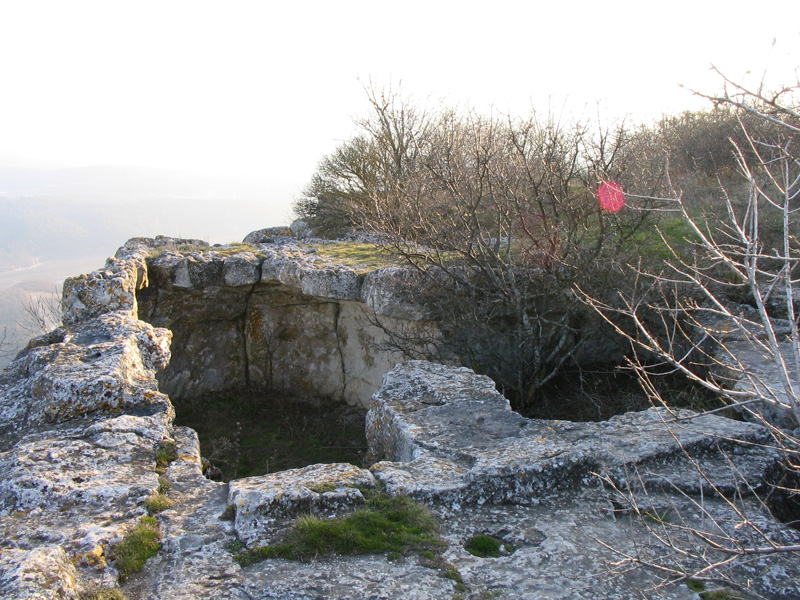
Dwelling remains

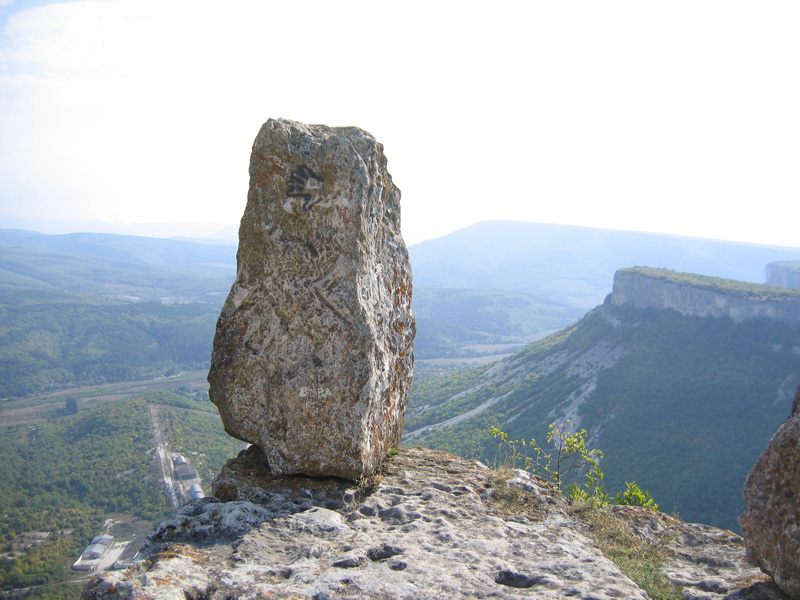
The stone at the south end

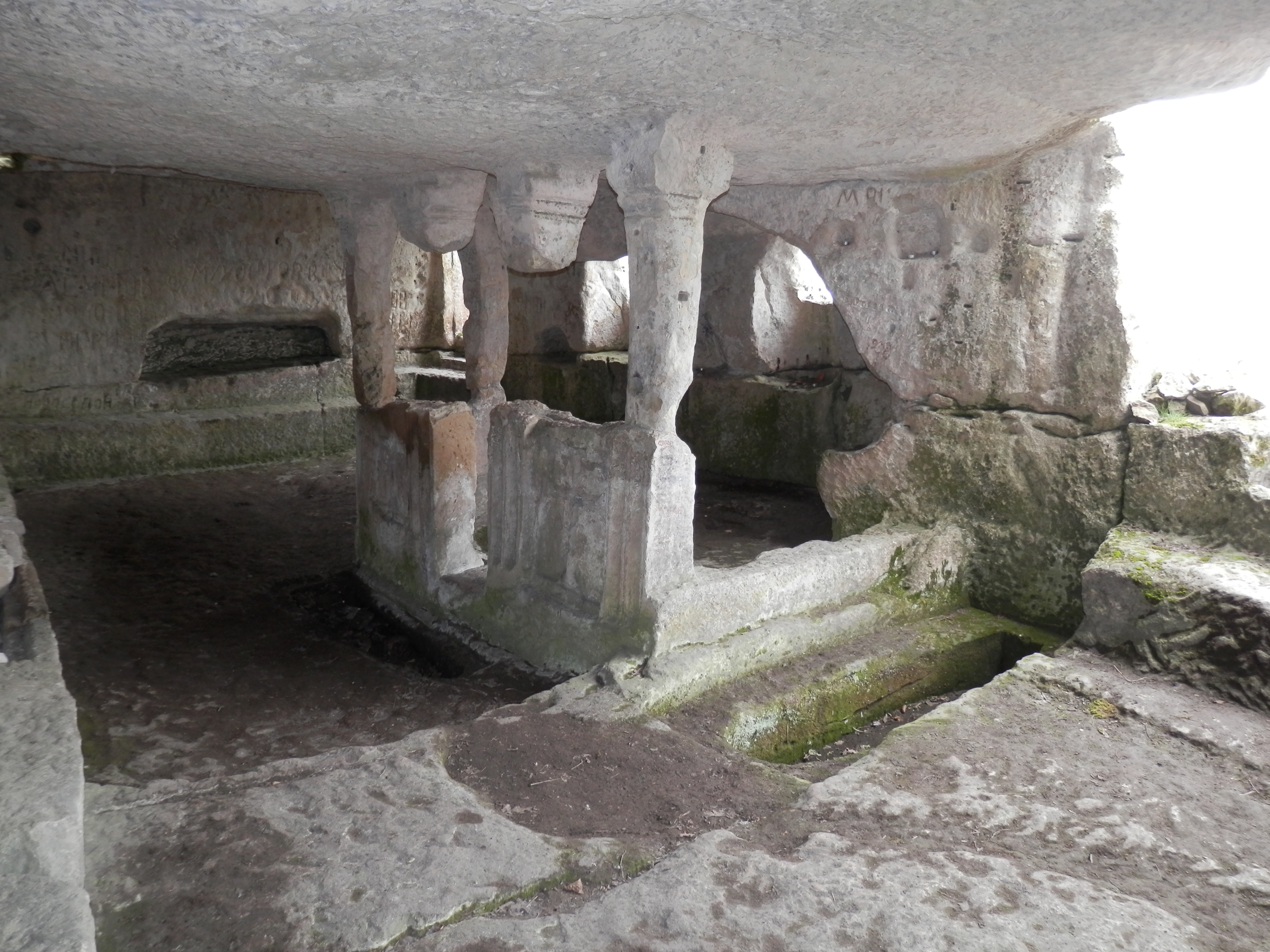
A baptistery church inside the cave

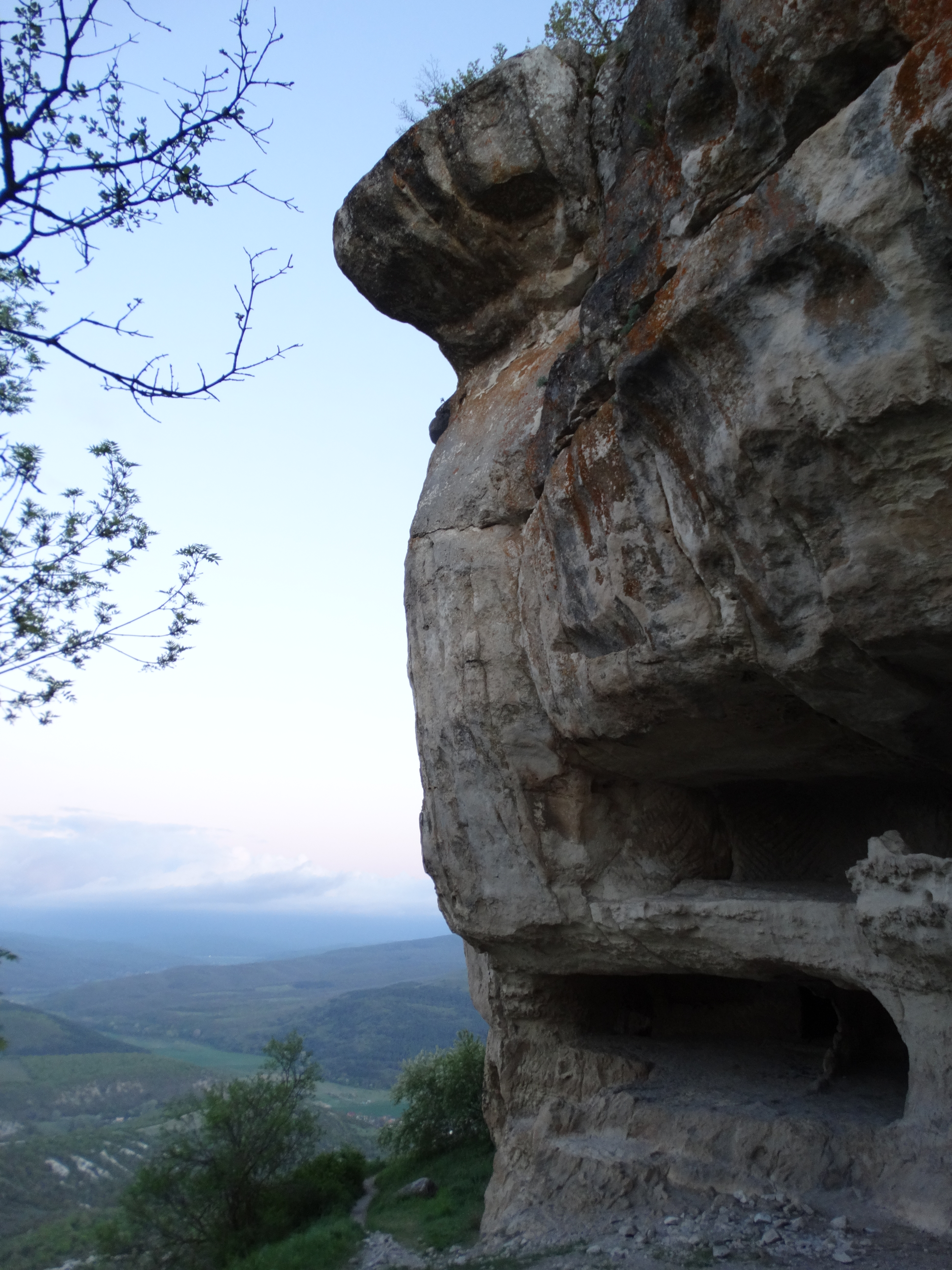
A large corner cave

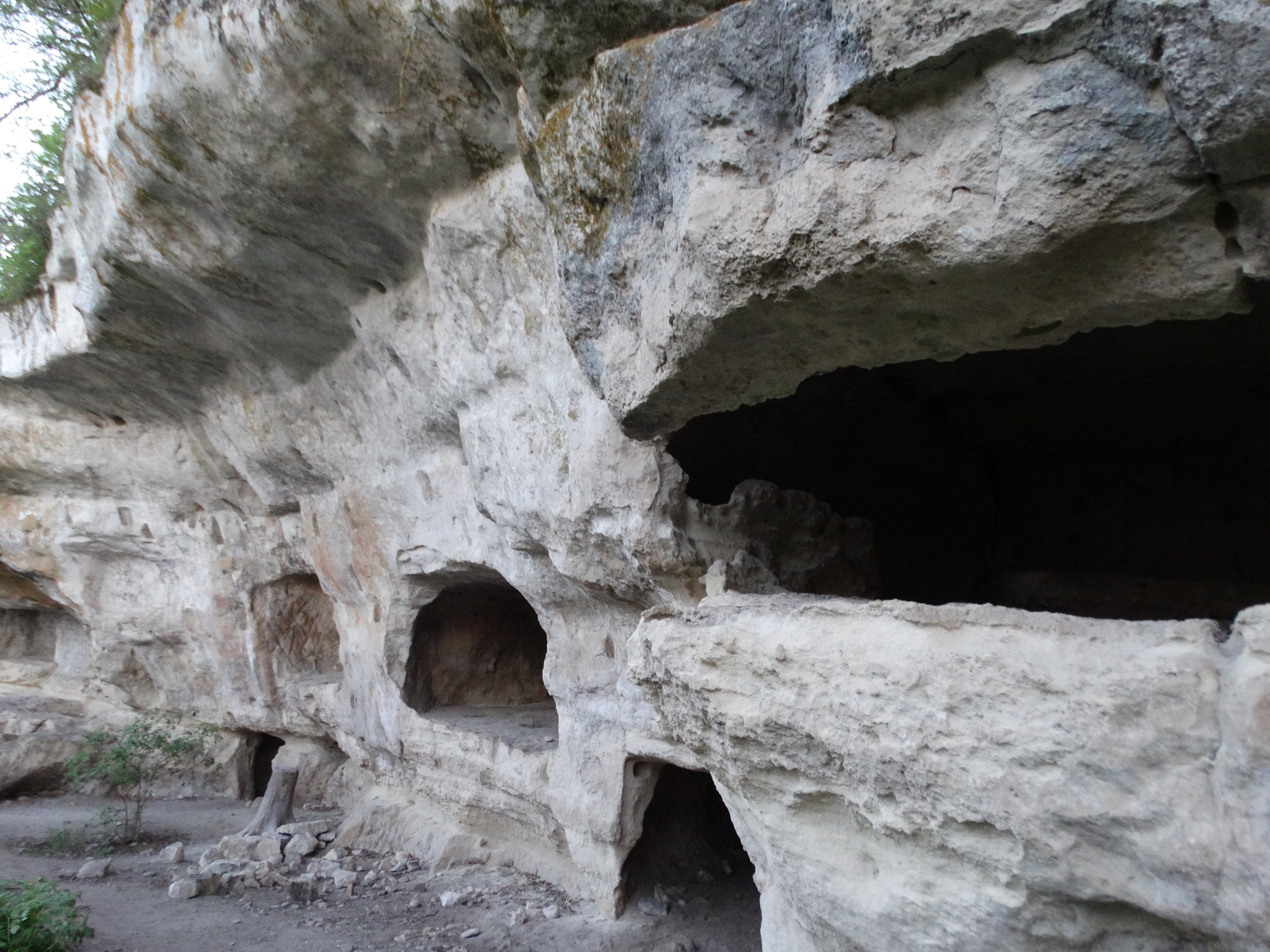
Cave dwellings with several levels

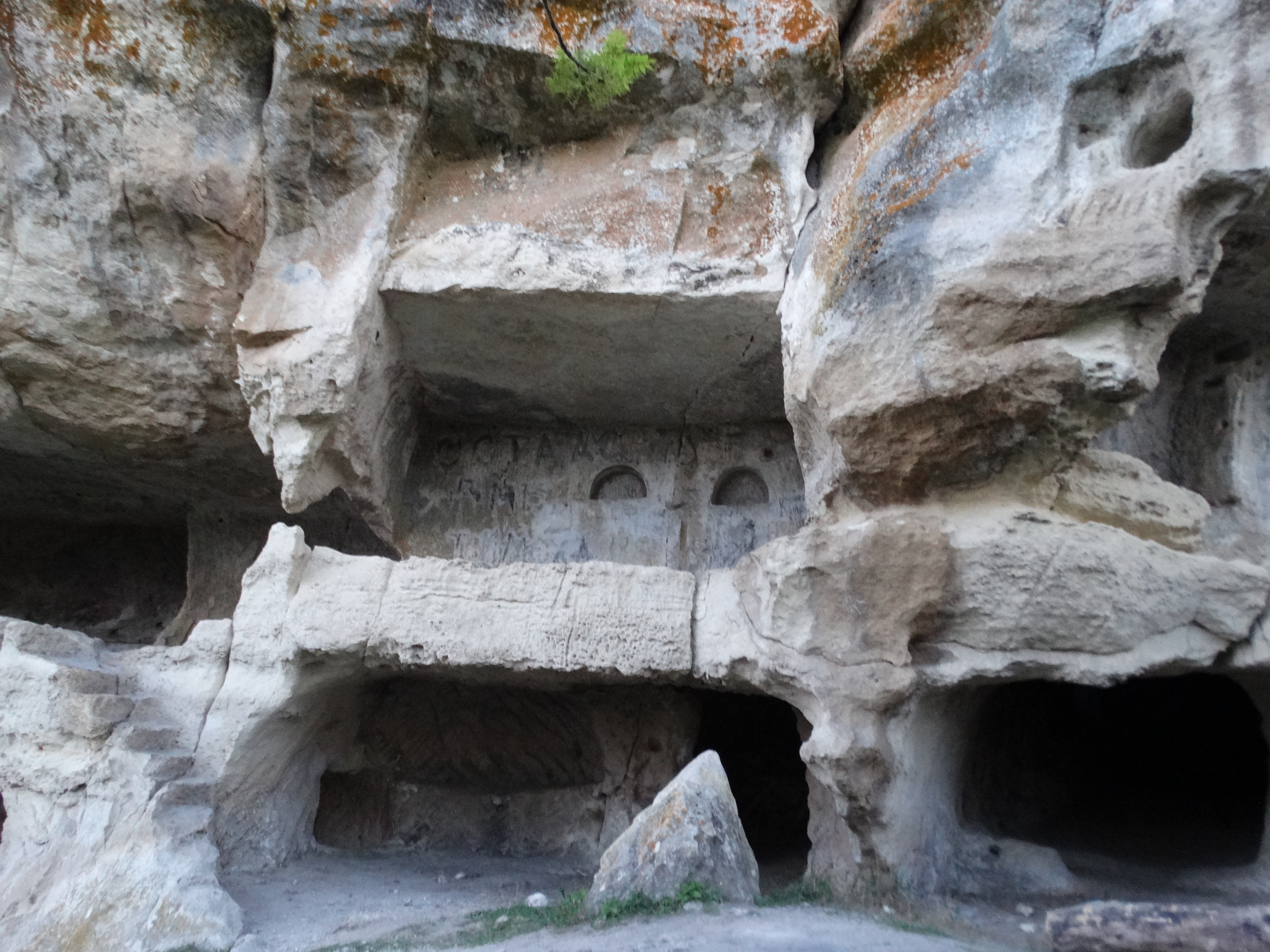
Niches for various household items seen in caves

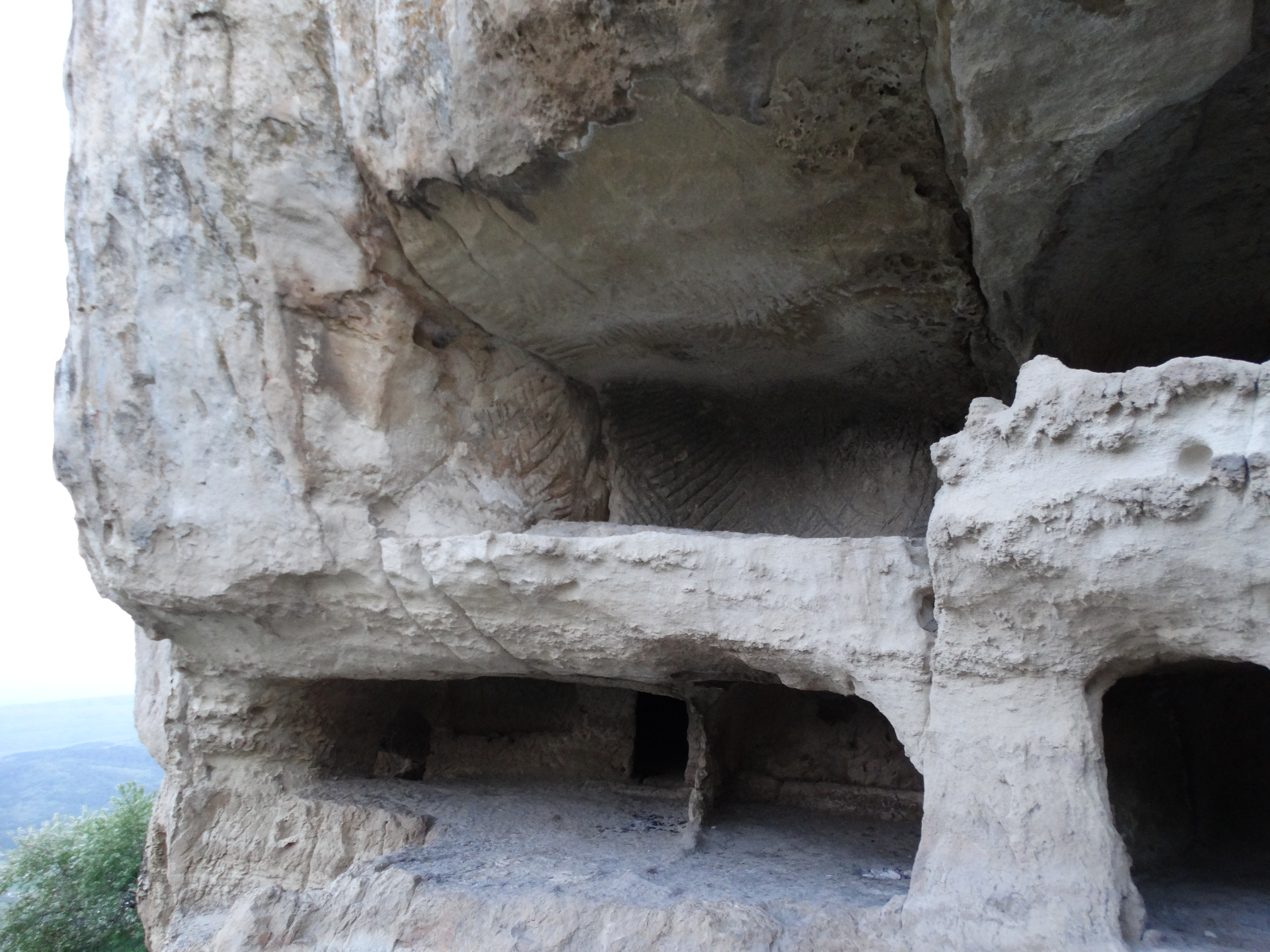
Spacious cave dwellings
