= Eski Yurt =

Former settlement, historical quarter of Bakhchysarai, Crimea

Coordinates: 44°44′56″N 33°50′51″E

Eski Yurt (Crimean Tatar: Eski Yurt; Ukrainian: Ескі-Юрт; Russian: Эски-Юрт) is a historical settlement in South West Crimea, presently a historical quarter in the western part of Bakhchysarai. Its name derives from the Crimean Tatar language terms for "old settlement" or "old headquarter" and "felt tent".

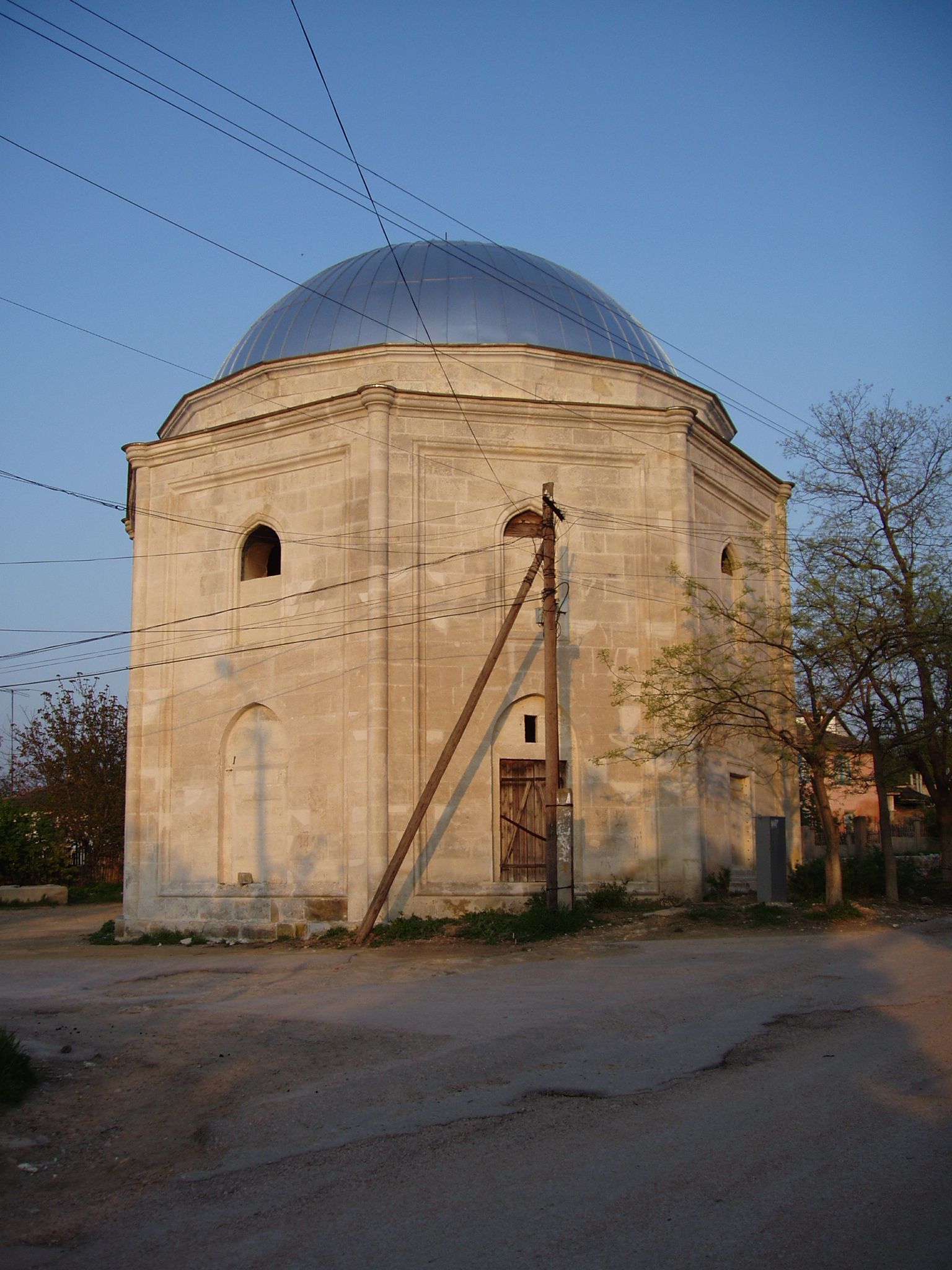
Mausoleum of Mehmed II Giray in Eski Yurt (Photo by Oleksa Haiworonski, 2005)

== History ==
In the times of the Golden Horde Eski Yurt was a large, possibly urban settlement lying on an ancient trade route connecting the seaports of Chersonesus and Kalamita with the interiors of the Crimean Peninsula. The large size of the settlement may be proved by the size of its main cemetery Qırq Azizler (14th–15th centuries; now completely destroyed) which was the oldest and the largest one of all Muslim cemeteries known in the western half of the Crimea. Eski Yurt retained its significance after the rise of the Crimean Khanate, which achieved independence from the Golden Horde in 1441. Along with a fortified mountain stronghold named Qırq Yer and laying a mile to the east Eski Yurt might be used as the main residence of the first Crimean khans after they moved their court from Solkhat in the eastern part of the Crimean Peninsula to the South West, where Eski Yurt is situated. Eventually, after the new Crimean capital Bakhchysarai had been founded in 1532, Eski Yurt lost its economic and administrative status (and apparently received its later name of "Old Settlement"; the original name remains unknown). Nevertheless, up to the beginning of the 20th century Eski Yurt was still considered by the Crimean Tatars as one of the most important Muslim religious centers in the Crimea due to the sanctuary of Malik Ashtar which existed there.

== Aziz of Malik Ashtar in Eski Yurt ==
The Aziz ("sanctuary") of Malik Ashtar was located in the central part of Eski Yurt. It was a large Muslim cemetery whose main object was the "maqam" (symbolical tomb) of Malik al-Ashtar en-Nahai (618–658), a companion of khalif Ali Ibn Abi Talib (618–657), actually buried in Cairo, Egypt. Similar "maqam" attributed to Malik Ashtar is situated also in Diyarbakır, Turkey. The Crimean Tatar tales portray Malik Ashtar as a dragon fighter and the brave warrior, who was the first to spread Islam in Crimea. According to the legends, he was wounded to the death in a battle with giants and died in Eski Yurt. Long time after, the legends say, his grave was discovered in a miraculous way by dervishes of the Nakshbandi (or Mevlevi) order, who established the shrine of his name. The Crimean Tatars believed that those bitten by snakes may obtain healing visiting the Aziz of Malik Ashtar and praying there. The shrine was surrounded by a large Muslim cemetery with hundreds of engravements arranged in common graves, underground stone vaults and in mausoleums. As narrative sources state, the cemetery was a place to bury noble people including some of the Crimean Tatar rulers from the Giray dynasty. The mosque at Aziz, besides being a common prayer house, was also used as a "tekiye" for the dervishes who practiced their mystical rituals and prayer dances inside it.

The Muslim religious center in Eski Yurt attracted a lot of visitors and existed till the 1920s when the Soviet regime closed it along with many other shrines and temples of different faiths.

== Current condition ==
In 1948, after the Deportation of Crimean Tatars, Eski Yurt village (along with practically all other Crimean towns and villages bearing non-Russian names) was renamed to "Podgorodnyeye" (Подгороднее). Eventually Podgorodnyeye was incorporated into the urban area of Bakhchysarai. The area of the old settlement hides underground the ruins of the medieval town, covered with cottages, while the central square of the Aziz shrine was used as a market. After the repatriation of the Crimean Tatars had started in the late 1980s many Crimean Tatar activists and organizations demanded the removal of the market from the holy place. In 2004 a project to establish a museum at the site of Aziz had been worked out by the Bakhchysarai Historical and Cultural Reserve. In 2006 the market had been finally moved to a new place, opening the way to the Bakhchysarai Historical and Cultural Reserve to run their project of creating the new museum.

== Remaining historical buildings ==
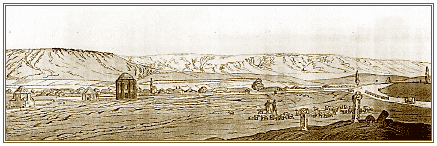
Eski Yurt in 1793 (by P. S. Pallas)

- Mausoleum of Bey Yude Sultan, the mother of Muhammed Şah Bey (14th-15th centuries).
- Mausoleum of Ahmed Bey (a building of the 14th or 15th century, called after the name from a gravestone found by its walls).
- Mausoleum of Mehmed Bey (16th century).
- Mausoleum of Mehmed II Giray - a family shrine of the Crimean Tatar ruling dynasty. According to narrative sources, three Crimean khans were buried inside it: Mehmed II Giray (died 1584), Saadet II Giray (died 1588), Mehmed III Giray (died 1629).
- A smaller minaret, often mistakenly called a minbar (15th-17th centuries).

== Gallery ==
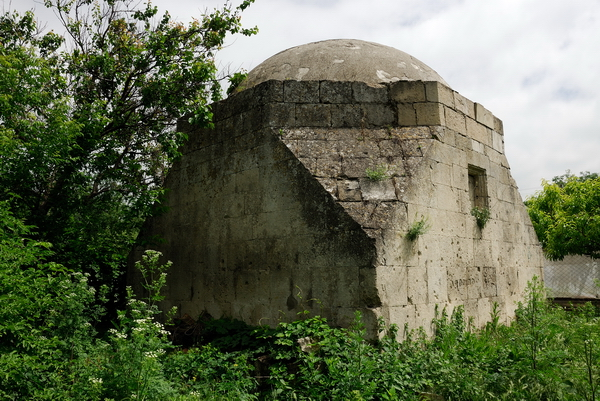
Dürbe of Bey Yude Sultan

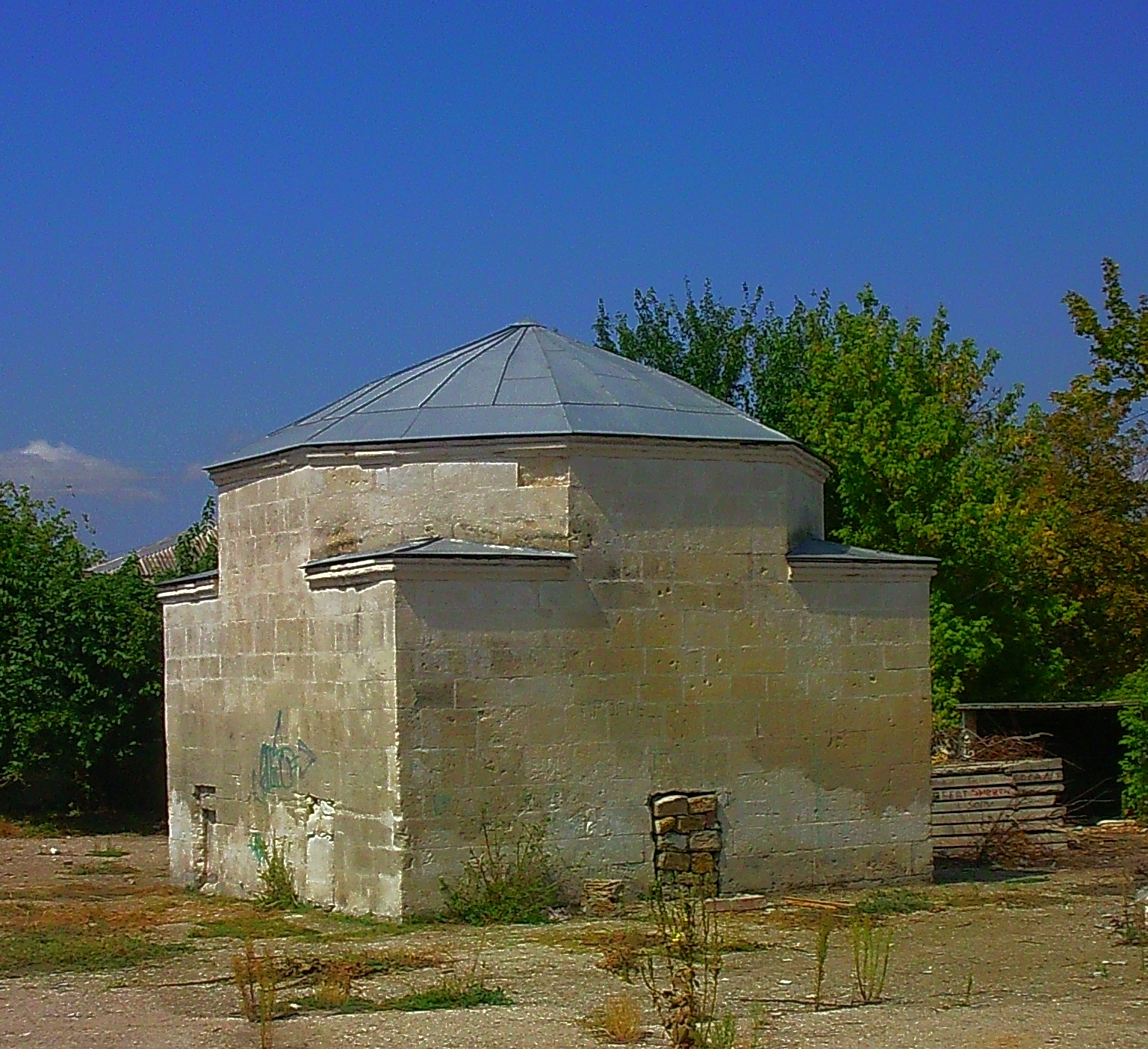
Dürbe of Ahmed Bey

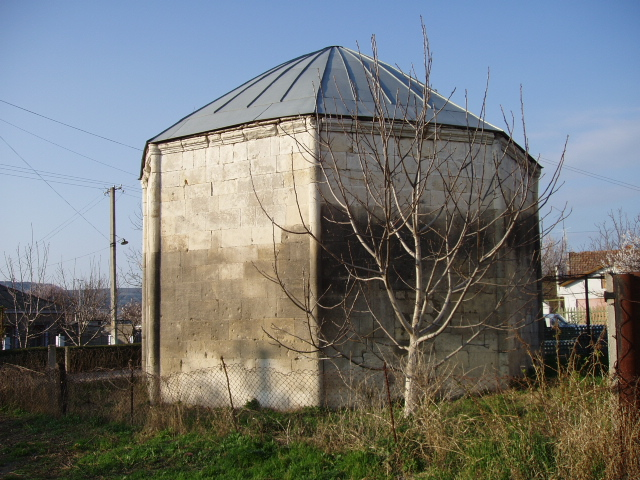
Dürbe of Mehmed Bey

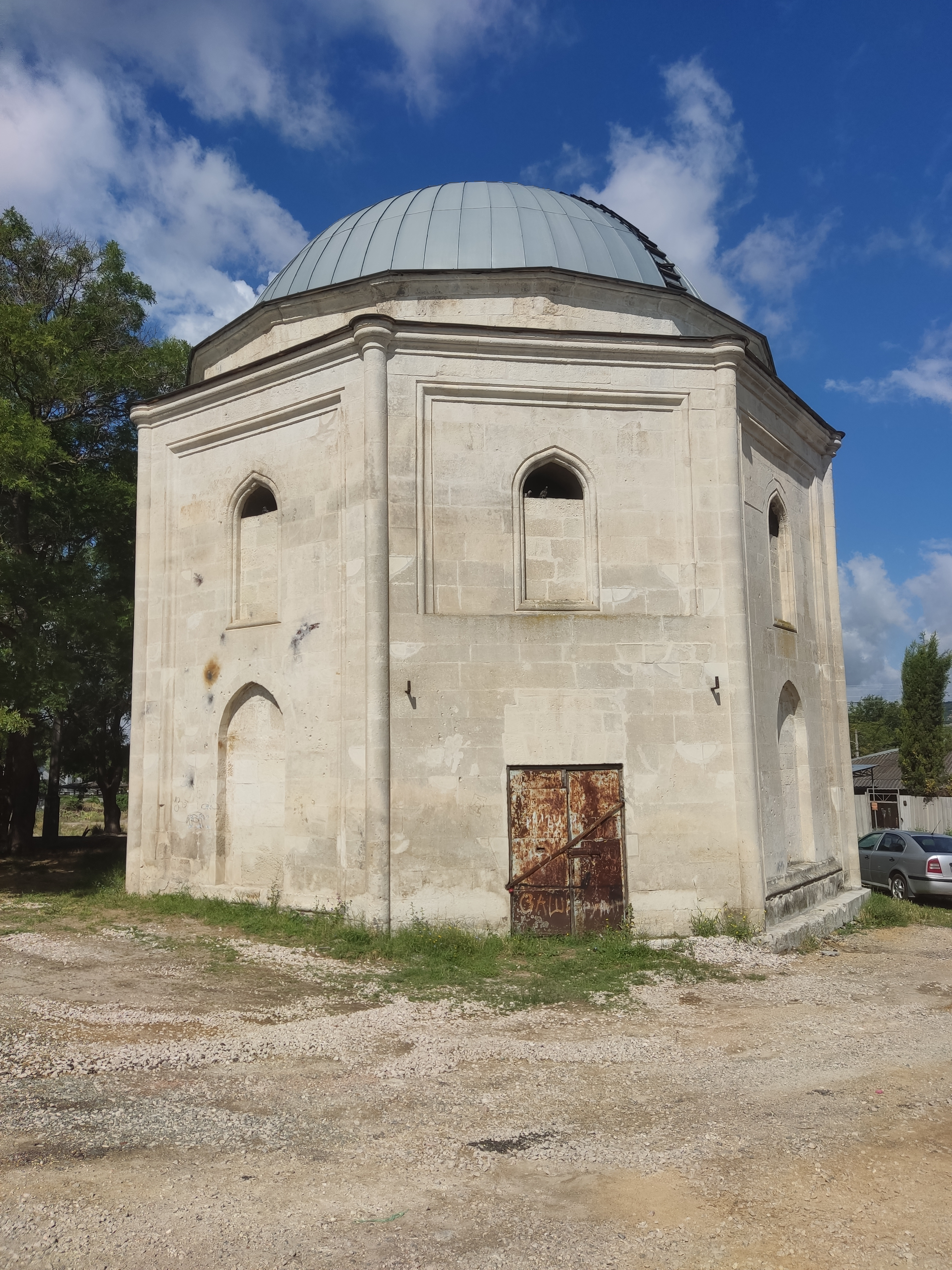
Dürbe of Mehmed II Giray

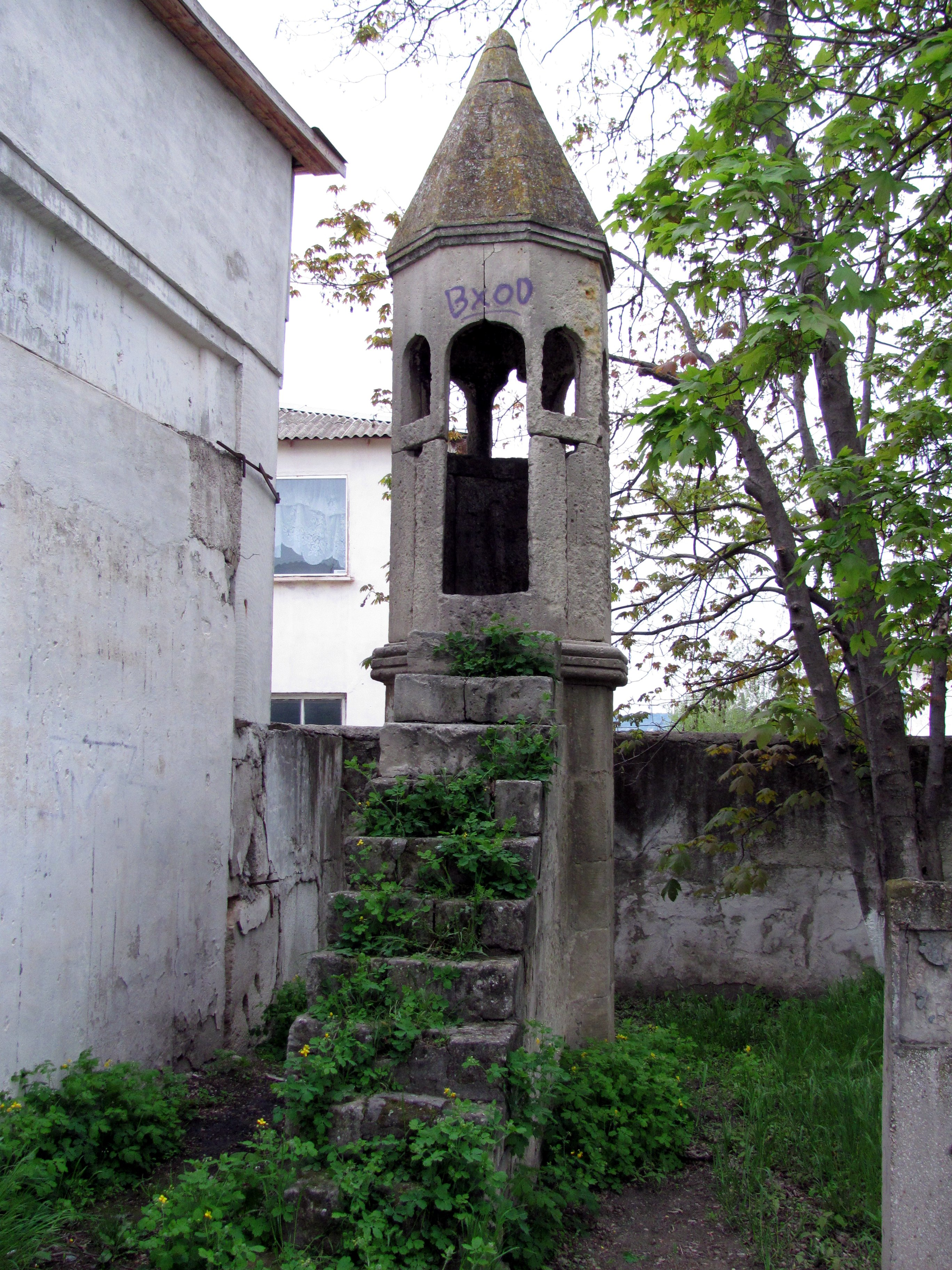
Minaret
