= Eski Dürbe =

- Eski Dürbe (Crimean Tatar); Ескі-Дюрбе (Ukrainian)
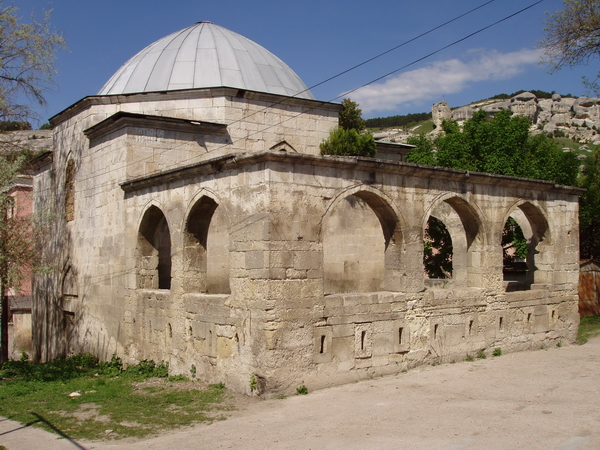

- Location within Crimea
- Interactive map of Eski Dürbe
- 44°44′50″N 33°53′6″E
- Type: Türbe
- Etymology: Crimean Tatar for old tomb
- Location: Zoia Kosmodem'ians'ka Street, Bakhchysarai, Crimea, Ukraine

History
- Built: 14th century (according to some sources, 17th century)
- Built for: Unknown

Immovable Monument of National Significance of Ukraine
- Official name: Гробниця “Ескі Дюрбе” (Eski Dürbe tomb)
- Type: Architecture
- Reference no.: 010078

Eski Dürbe (Crimean Tatar for old tomb) is the oldest türbe in the town of Bakhchysarai, Crimea, Ukraine. According to some sources, Eski Dürbe was built in the 14th century, over 100 years before the Khan's Palace. The tomb is located on the left bank of the river Çürük Suv, 180m south-east of the Khan's Palace.

== History ==
Eski Dürbe, according to some sources, was built during the time of the Golden Horde and is today considered a monument of architectural and historical significance according to the State Register of Immovable (Tangible) Monuments of Ukraine. Despite its historical significance, the tomb has not been significantly investigated, and it is unknown who is buried there. According to Emil Seidaliev, Deputy General Director of Scientific Work at the Bakhchysarai Historical-Cultural and Architectural Open-Air Museum:

There are only folk legends that a certain bey was buried here, who owned the valley before Bakhchysarai was even founded. They call him Dere-bey, the "prince of the valley", but nobody knows who he was or why he found his final resting place here specifically. In any case, not a single written source mentions a persion with such a name.

At one point, Eski Dürbe was surrounded by a cemetery. Tombstones are visible on 19th-century drawings as well as on photographs taken at the start of the 20th century.

In 1927, under the leadership of Üsein Bodaninskiy, then-director of the Bakhchysarai Palace-Museum, restoration works were carried out: the dome was repaired, lost elements of the türbe and courtyard were restored, and iron doors were installed.

Further renovation was carried out in 1965: the lost parts of the courtyard walls were reconstructed and the dome was covered with a cement screed. In the mid-1990s, the dome was further covered with sheets of galvanised iron.

In 2013, an archaeological expedition led by Emil Seidaliev conducted research with the aim of dating the monument. According to the expedition's stratigraphic observations, the monument's construction can be attributed to the 17th century.

== Architecture ==
The tomb is notable for its well-executed stonework and austere appearance, with few decorative elements. Of the 10 türbe surviving to this day, Eski Dürbe is the only one built of local yellow stone, as opposed to white limestone.

The structure of the tomb is asymmetrical, and consists of two parts of differing heights: the türbe itself, and the courtyard adjacent to its southern facade. At one point, the courtyard is believed to have had a fountain. The courtyard can only be accessed from inside the tomb itself, leading archaeologists to conclude that it was conceived as a family cemetery or a place for those who came to pay respects to the deceased.
