= Bakhchysarai =

Bakhchysarai: Bağçasaray (Crimean Tatar); Бахчисарай (Ukrainian); Бахчисарай (Russian)
- City
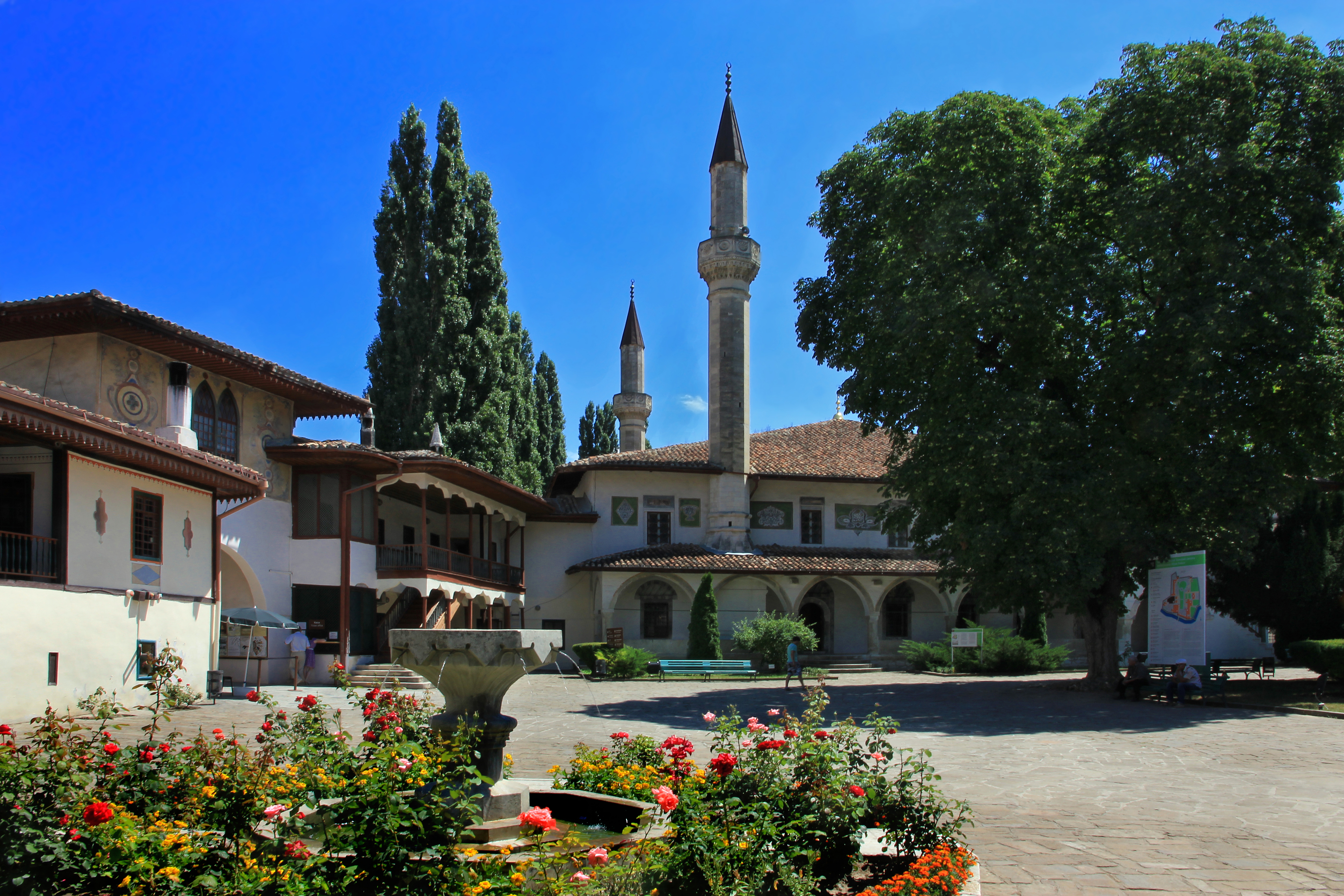
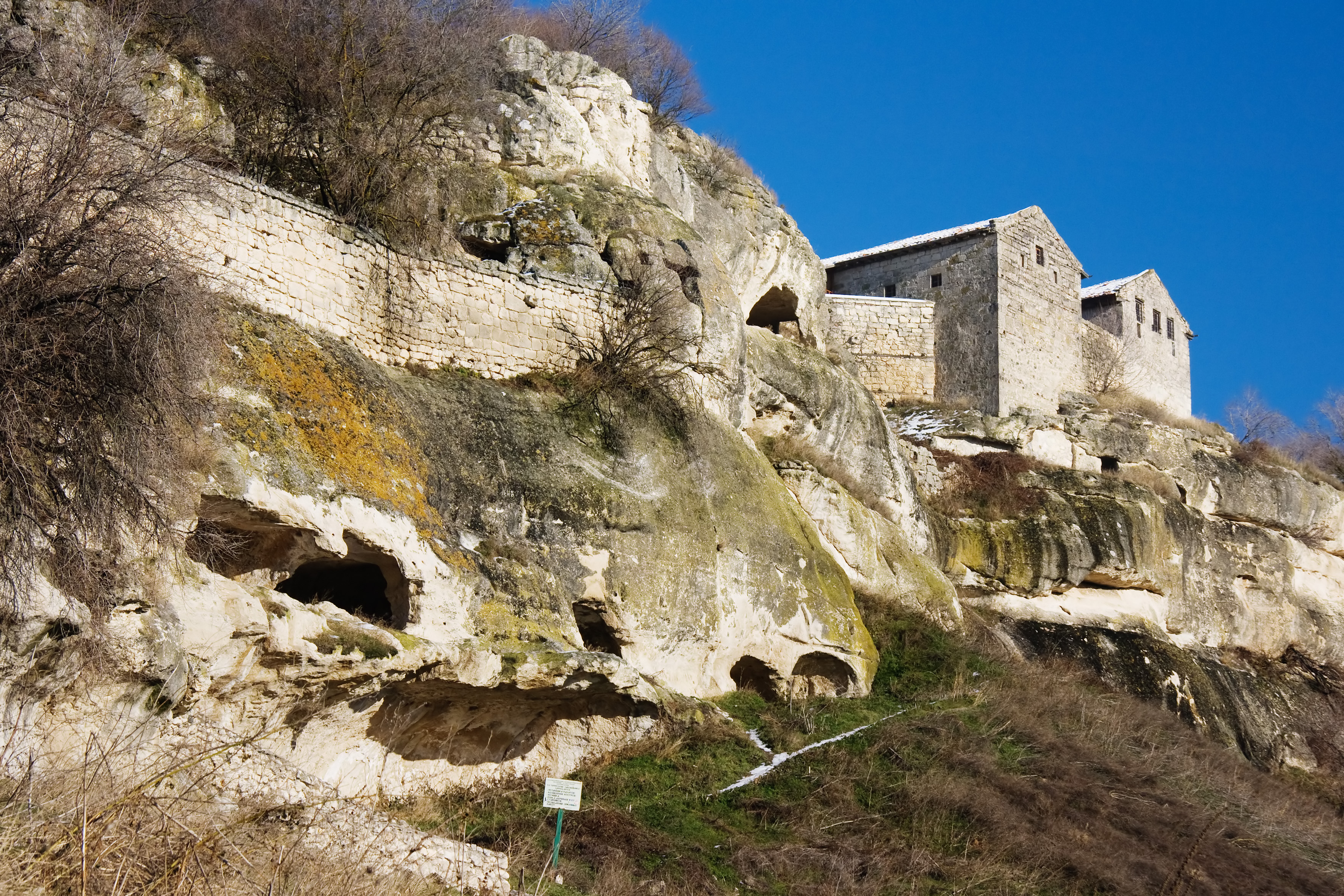
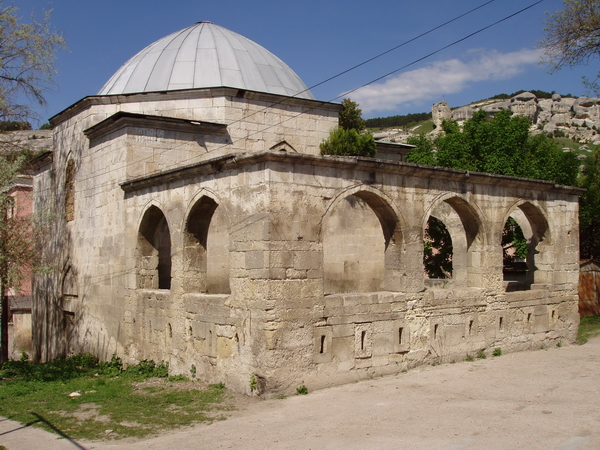
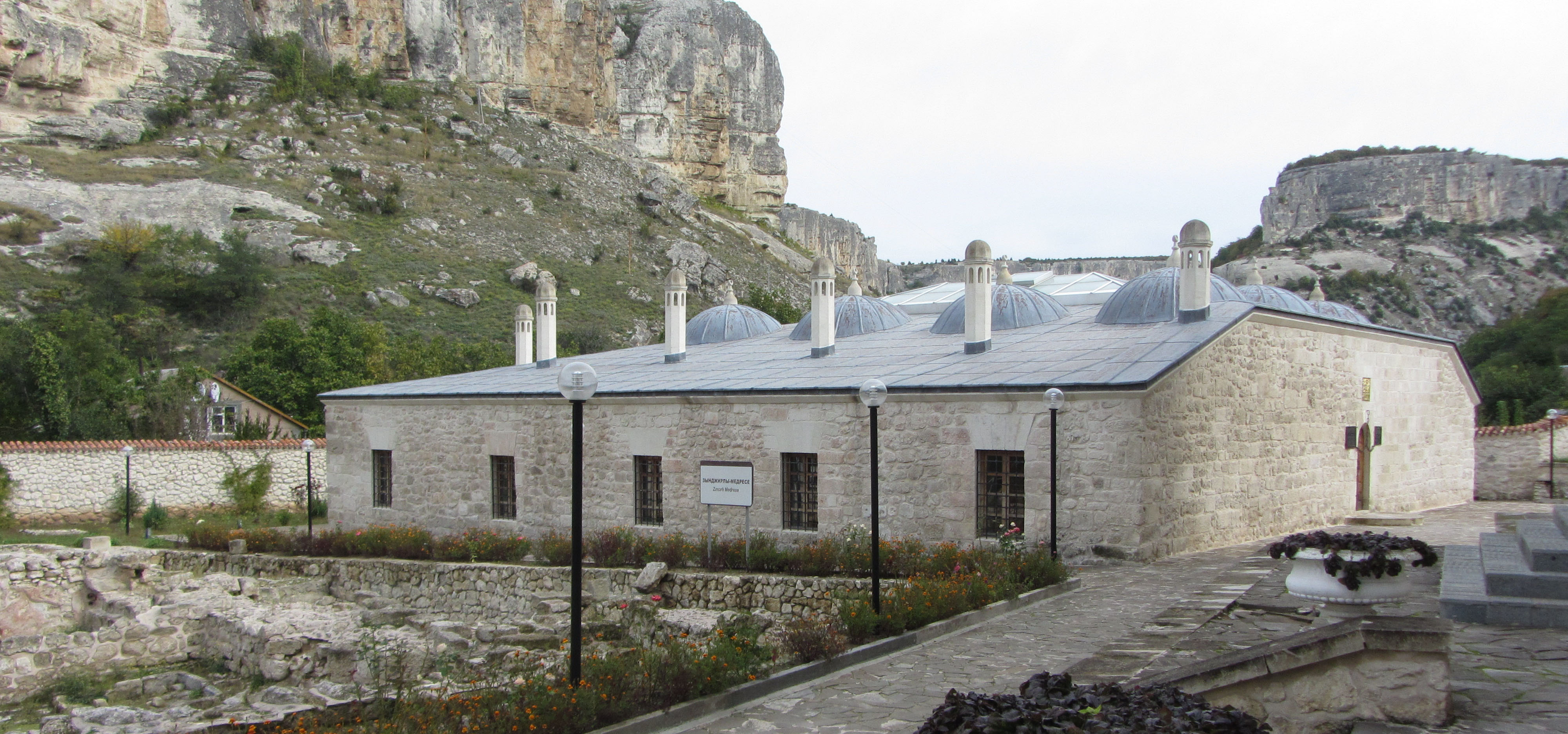
- The Bakhchysarai Palace Chufut-Kale Eski Dürbe Zincirli Madrasa

- Coat of arms
- Interactive map of Bakhchysarai
- Location of Bakhchysarai on a map of Crimea. Bakhchysarai (Ukraine)
- Coordinates: 44°45′10″N 33°51′39″E
- Country: Ukraine (occupied by Russia)
- Autonomous republic: Crimea (de jure)
- Raion: Bakhchysarai Raion (de jure)
- Federal subject: Crimea (de facto)
- Founded: 1532
- Founder: Sahib I Giray
- Elevation: 300 m (980 ft)

Population (2014)
  - Total: 27,448
- Time zone: UTC+3 (MSK)
- Postal code: 298400 — 298408
- Area code: +7-36554
- Climate: Cfa

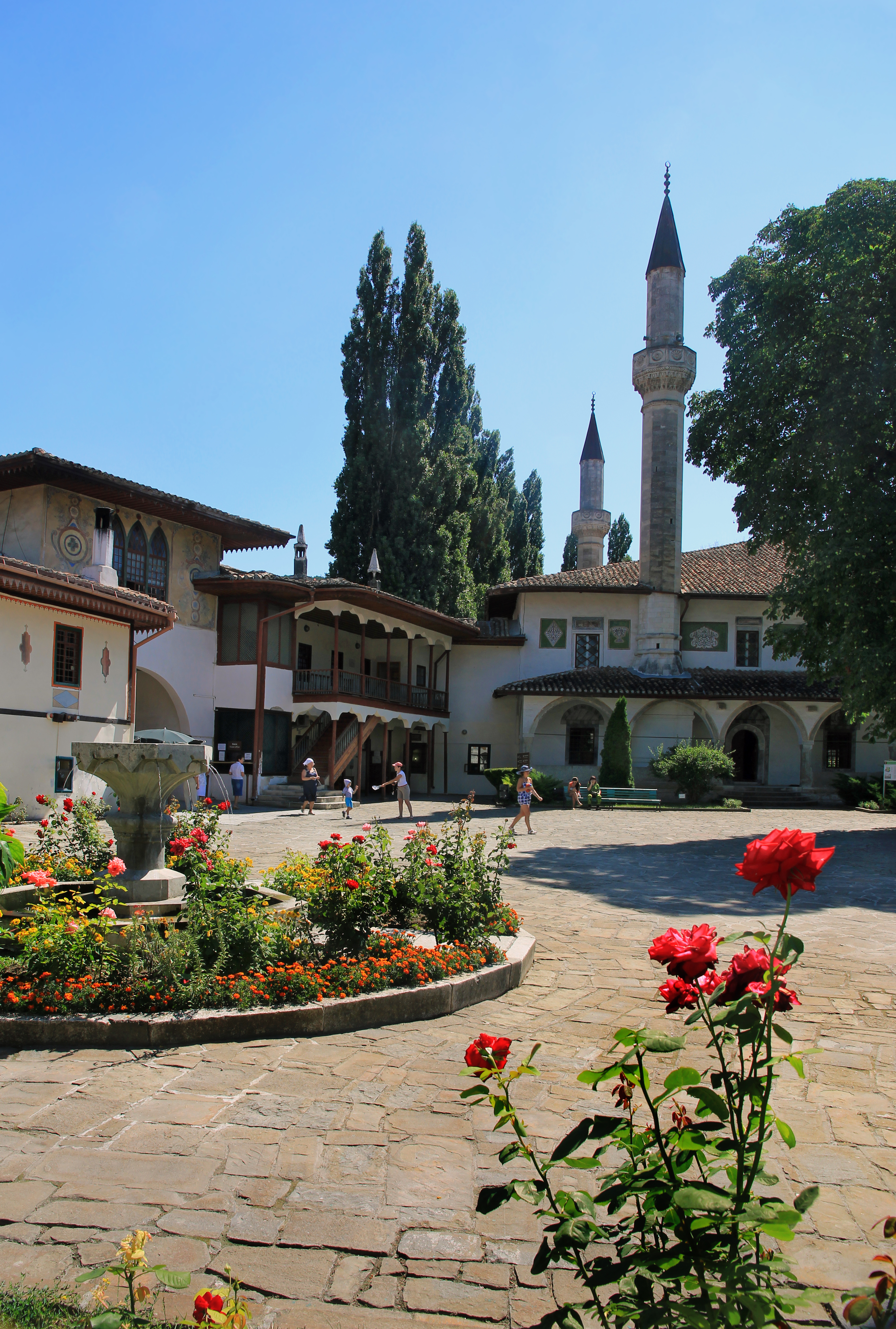
The Bakhchysarai Palace in Bakhchysarai

Bakhchysarai (Note: Ukrainian: Бахчисарай, pronounced [bɐxtʃɪsɐˈrɑj]; Crimean Tatar: Bağçasaray, Багъчасарай; Persian: باغچه سراى, romanized: Bâghcheh Sarây̱; Russian: Бахчисарай, romanized: Bakhchisaray, pronounced [bəxtɕɪsɐˈraj]; Turkish: Bahçesaray, pronounced [bahtʃesaˈɾaj]; lit. 'garden palace'.) is a city in the Autonomous Republic of Crimea, Ukraine. It is the administrative center of the Bakhchysarai Raion (district), as well as the former capital of the Crimean Khanate. Its main landmark is Hansaray, the only extant palace of the Crimean Khans, currently open to tourists as a museum. Population: 27,448 (2014 Census).

Since the beginning of the Russo-Ukrainian War in 2014, it has been occupied by the Russian Federation.

== Geography ==
Bakhchysarai lies in a narrow valley of the Çürük Suv river, about 30 Kilometers south-west of Simferopol.

== History ==
The earliest known man-made objects found in the valley date from the Mesolithic period. Settlements have existed in the valley since Late Antiquity. Before the founding of Bakhchysarai the Qırq Yer fortress (modern Çufut Qale), Salaçıq, and Eski Yurt were built. These have since become incorporated into the urban area of modern Bakhchysarai.

Bakhchysarai first appears in historical documents in 1502. In 1532 Sahib I Giray, Khan of Crimea from 1532 to 1551, established his residence there. From that time it served as the capital of the Crimean Khanate and the center of political and cultural life of the Crimean Tatar people. In 1675 the town was sacked by Cossacks during Ivan Sirko's Crimean Campaign. In 1736 the town was burned during the Russo-Turkish War (1735–1739). Following the annexation of the Crimean Khanate by the Russian Empire in 1783, Bakhchysarai became an ordinary town, having lost administrative significance. However, it remained a cultural center of the Crimean Tatars for several decades afterward, fostered by Ismail Gaspirali (1851-1914) who founded the local newspaper Terciman in 1883.

During the Crimean War of 1853–56, Bakhchysarai essentially became a hospital town as wounded Russian soldiers from the battlefield were brought in to be treated. The Battle of the Alma, one of the earliest battles of the war, took place not far from the city in 1854. But although the city was close to the front line, the Turks and their European allies never took it, as the port city of Sevastopol was their primary wartime objective.

With the collapse of the Russian Empire in 1917 and the unification of several socialist republics that had been part of the Russian Empire, Bakhchysarai became part of the Soviet Union (established 30 December 1922) in 1922.

The Sürgün, the deportation of the Crimean Tatars of 18 May 1944 in Bakhchysarai was prompted by accusations that the Tatars collaborated with the Axis occupiers. Although deportation of some Tatars in Crimea began as early as 1860, under the Russian Empire, the Sürgün delivered the final blow, emptying the city of Tatars. They were not to return to the city until 1989, when Soviet policies relaxed.

Bakhchysarai became a part of newly independent Ukraine in 1991. However, it became a de facto part of the Russian Federation when Russian Armed Forces invaded and annexed the city and the whole of Crimea in 2014.

== Name and associations ==
Spellings of the town's name in different languages include:

- Crimean Tatar: Bağçasaray
- Turkish: Bahçesaray
- Russian: Бахчисарай - Bakhchisaray
- Ukrainian: Бахчисарай - Bakhchysarai

The name comes from Persian باغچه سرای bāghche-sarāy, which means the Garden Palace. In Crimean Tatar, bağça means "garden" and saray means "palace".

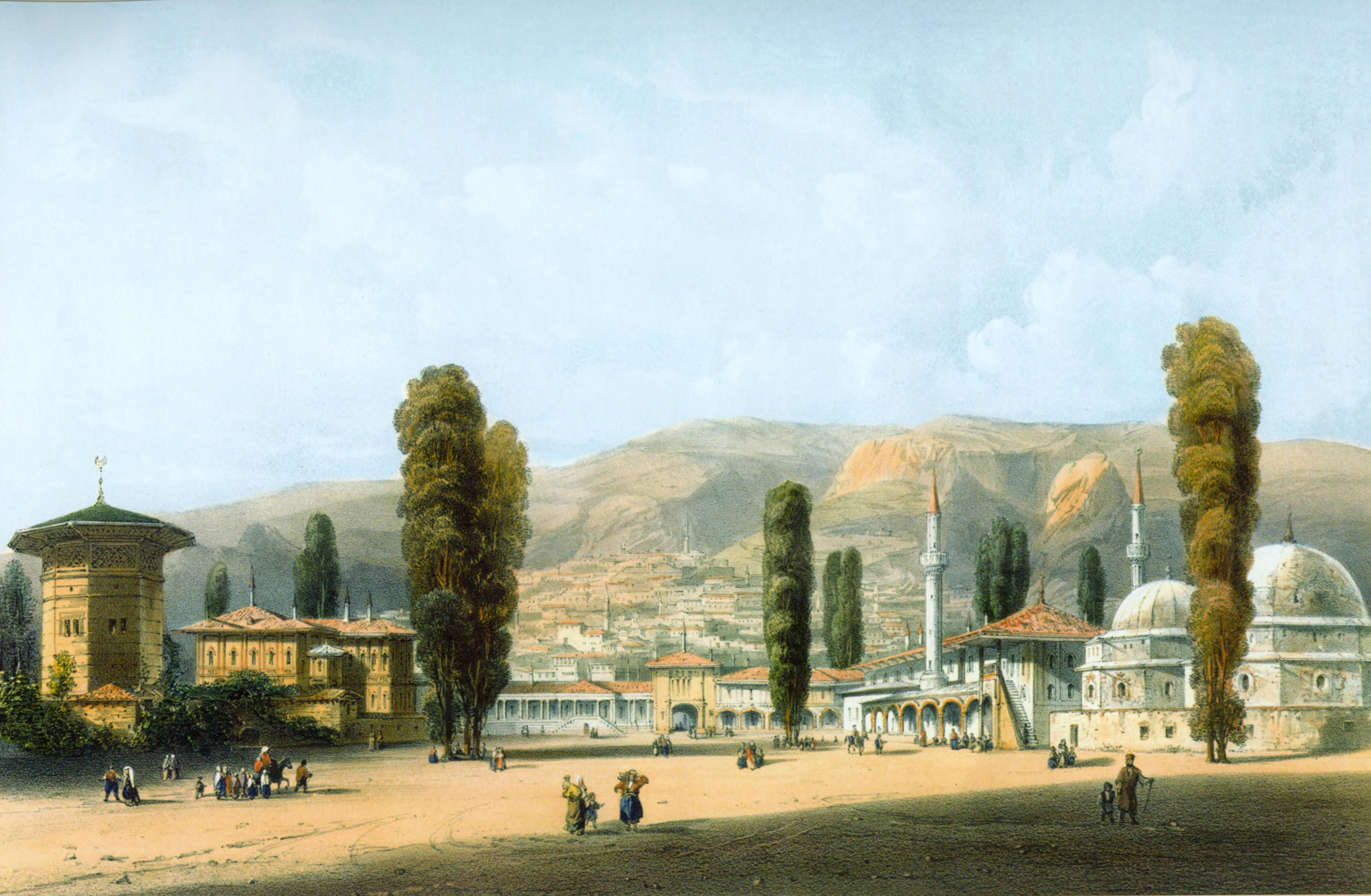
The city in 1856, by Carlo Bossoli.

Russian-speakers associate the town with the Romantic connotations of Alexander Pushkin's poem The Fountain of Bakhchysarai (1822). Adam Mickiewicz devoted some of the finest poems in his Polish-language Crimean Sonnets (1825) to the landmarks of Bakhchysarai (Polish: Bakczysaraj).

An asteroid, 3242 Bakhchisaraj, discovered by Soviet astronomer Nikolai Stepanovich Chernykh in 1979, takes its name after the town.

== Attractions ==
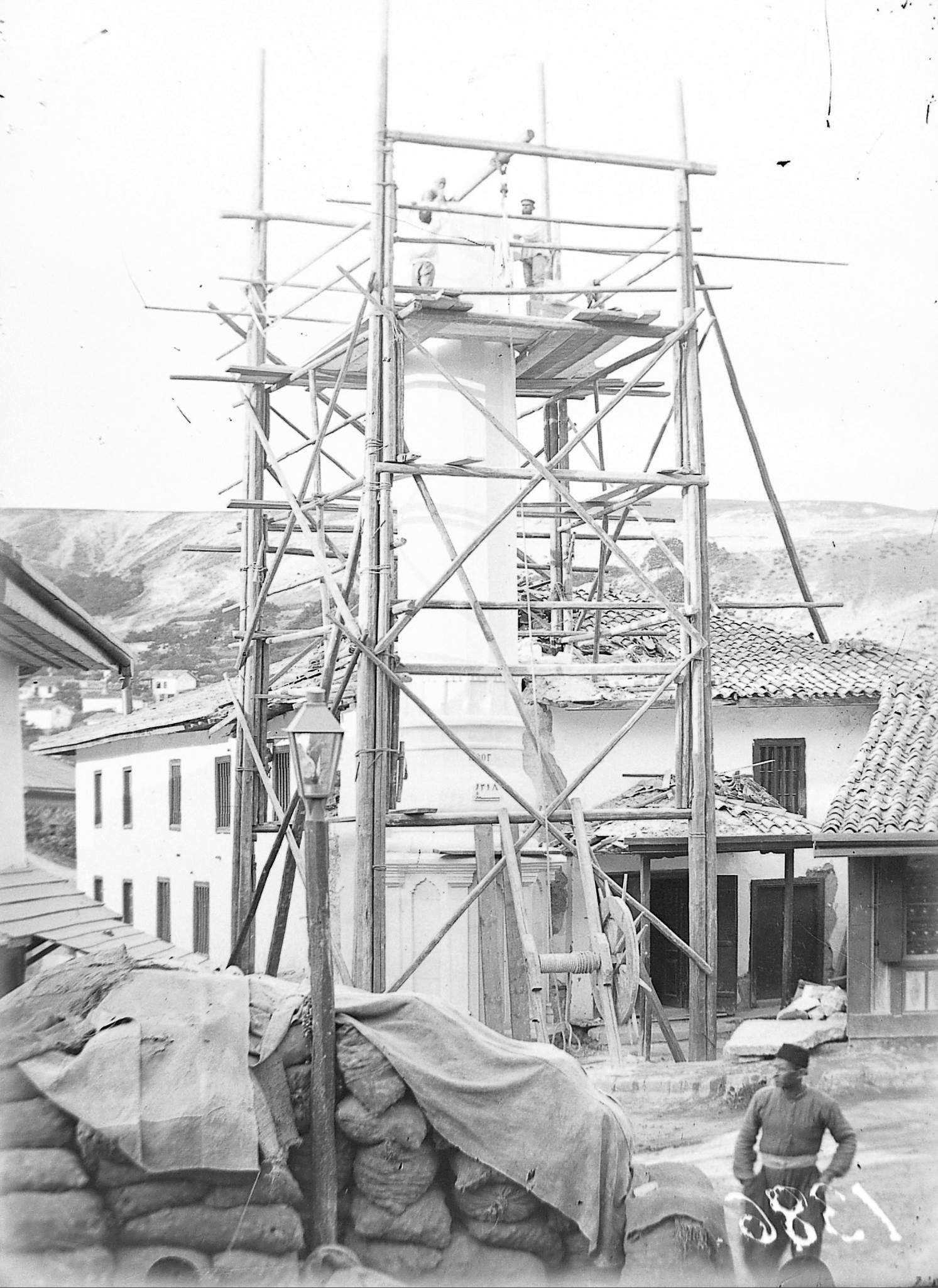
Arslan-Aga Mosque, 1928

Famous attractions within or near Bakhchysarai are:

- Eski Yurt
- Eski Dürbe
- Chufut-Kale
- Khan's Palace
- Orta Cami Mosque
- Tahtali-Jami Mosque
- Cave Monastery
- Zincirli Madrasa
- Tepe-Kermen

There is a network of well marked hiking trails around the town. All the main attractions are connected with red-marked trail.

From 2011, the town's Tourist Information Centre was supported by the Czech Government and USAID. Support was cut off in 2014 following the Russian annexation of Crimea.

== Demographics ==
Historical Populations
Year	Pop.	±%
1897	12,959	—
1930	10,450	−19.4%
1939	10,891	+4.2%
1989	25,363	+132.9%
2006	26,400	+4.1%
2011	26,215	−0.7%

In 1930 the population of the city was 10,450. The ethnic groups represented were 7,420 Crimean Tatars, 1,850 Russians, 315 Jews, 205 Greeks, 185 Ukrainians, 50 Germans, 30 Armenians, 30 Bulgarians, and 365 others.

As of 2001, the town had a population of 26,700 people. Russians make up the majority of the population, while ethnic Ukrainians and Crimean Tatars form significant minorities.

2001 Ukrainian census
	percent
Russians	60.30%
Crimean Tatars	18.70%
Ukrainians	16.95%
Belarusians	1.24%
Tatars	0.58%
Armenians	0.19%
Azerbaijanis	0.14%
Moldovans	0.12%
Poles	0.12%
Jews	0.12%

== Gallery ==
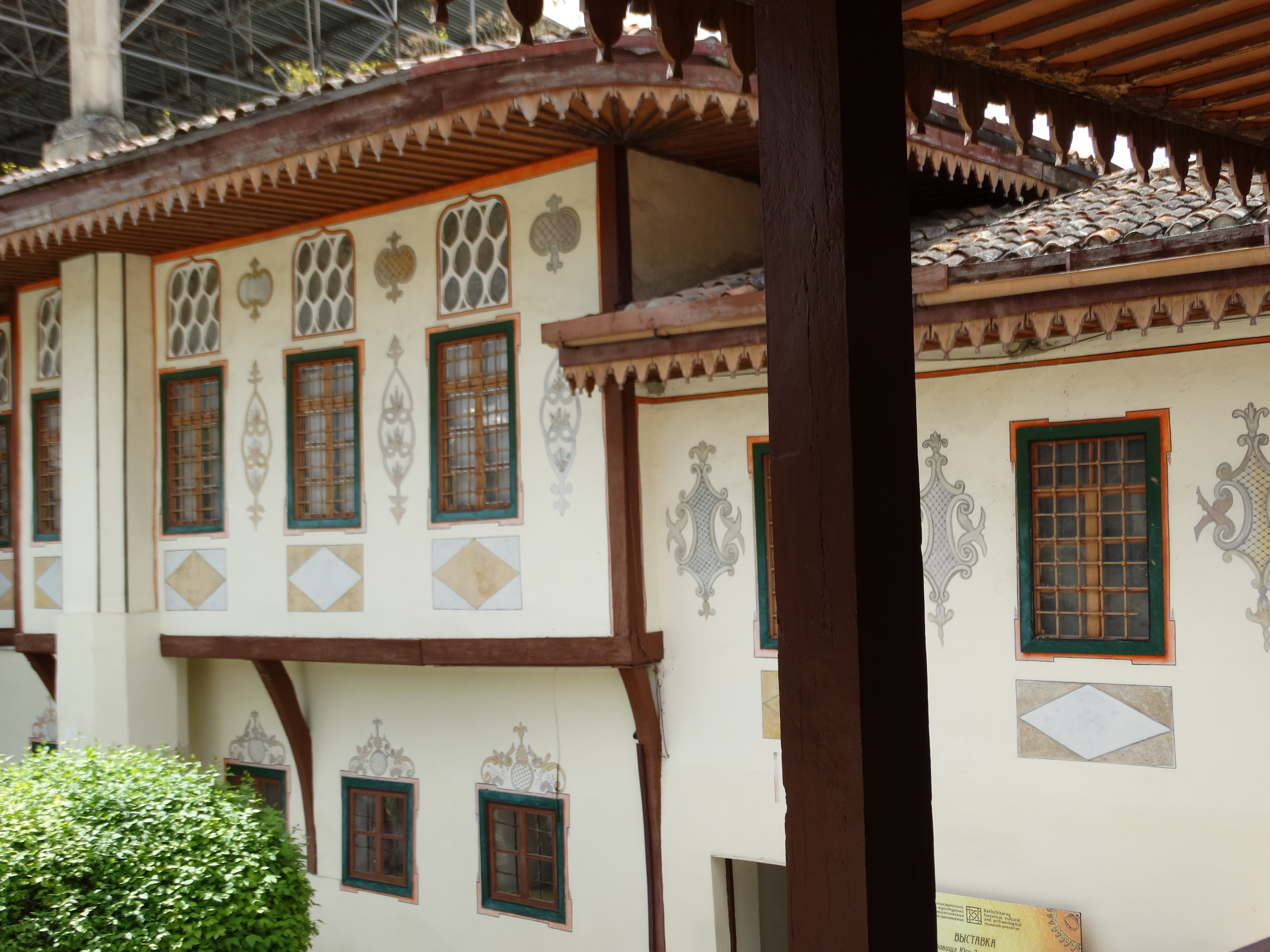

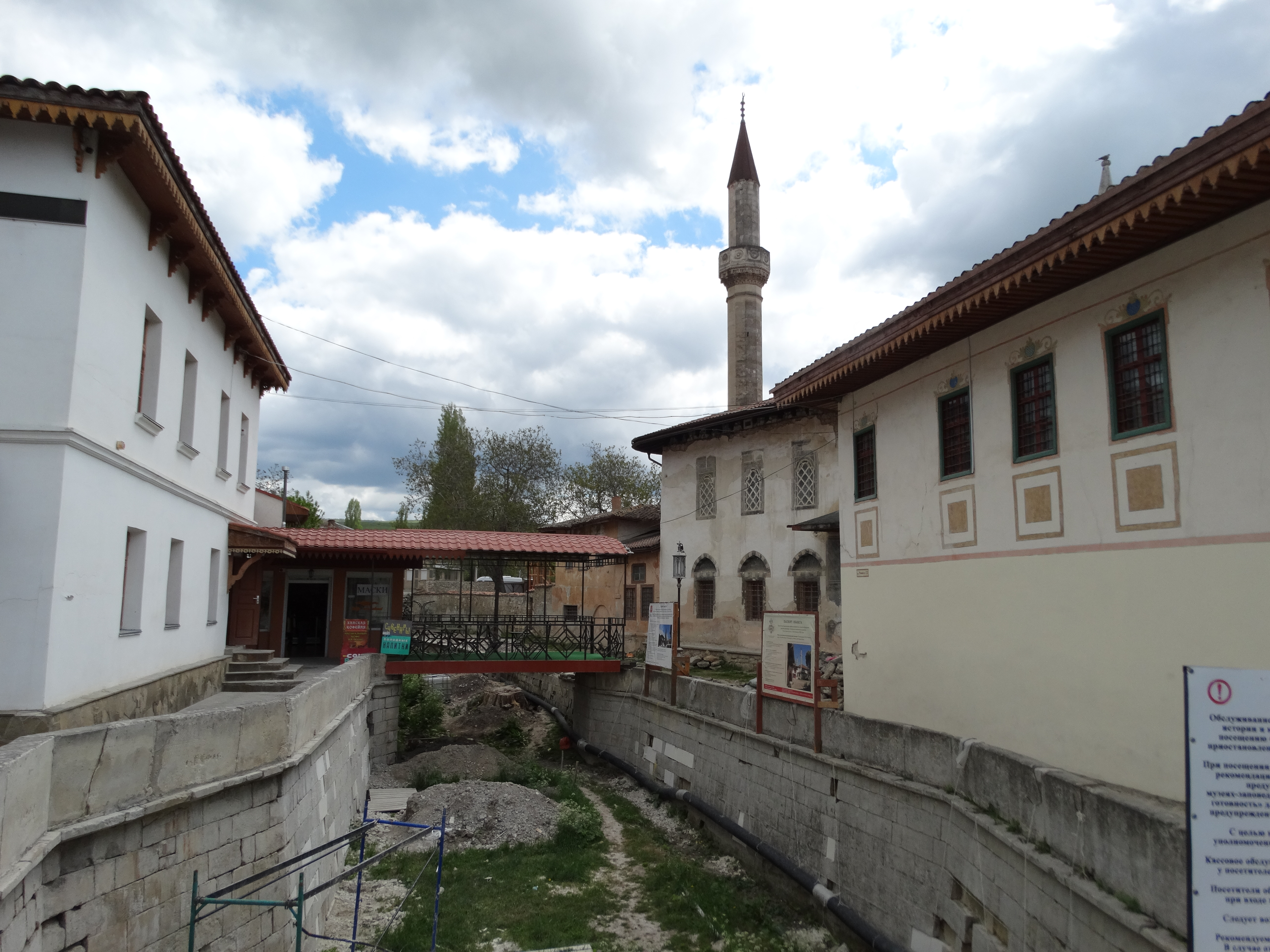

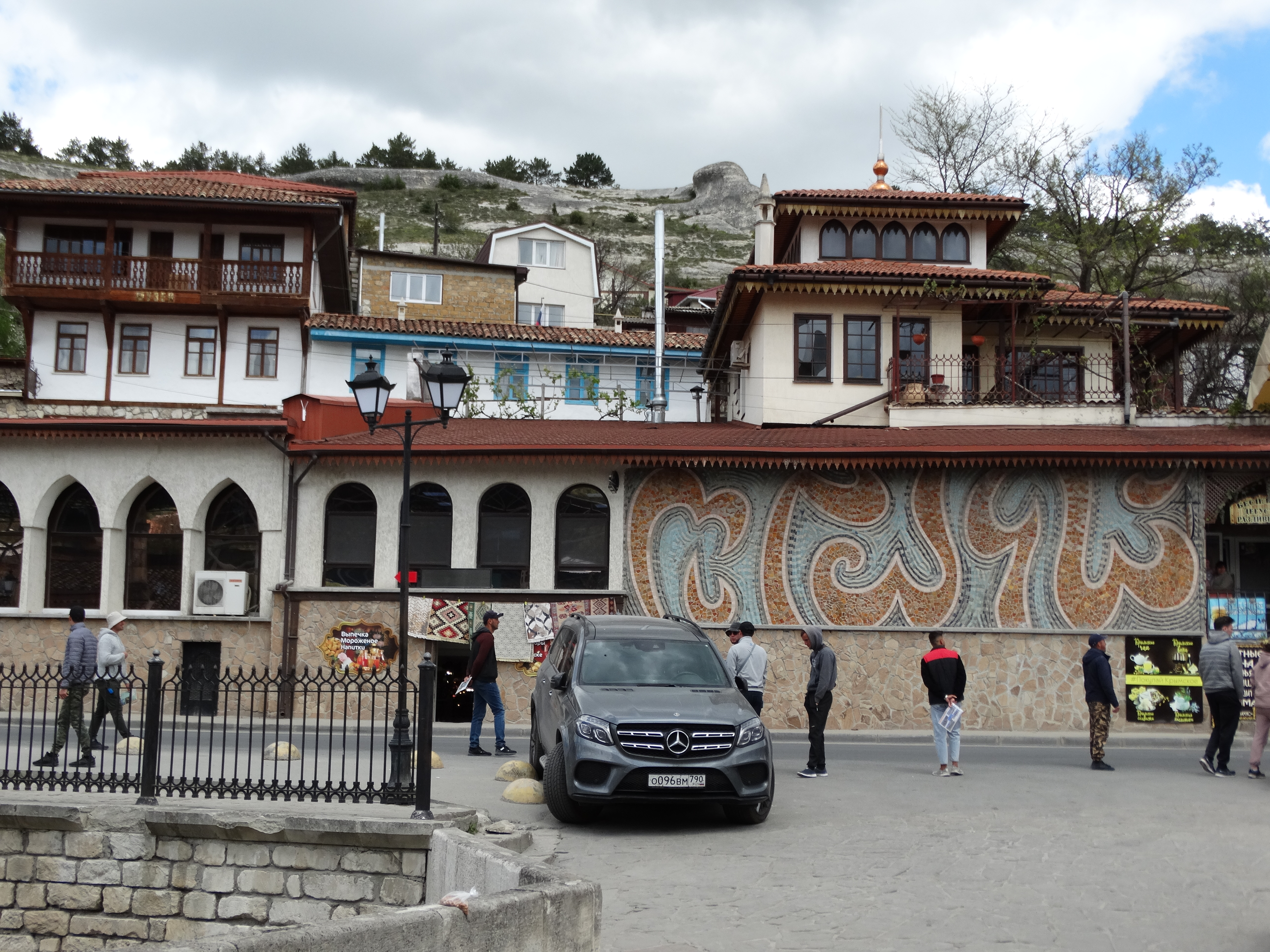

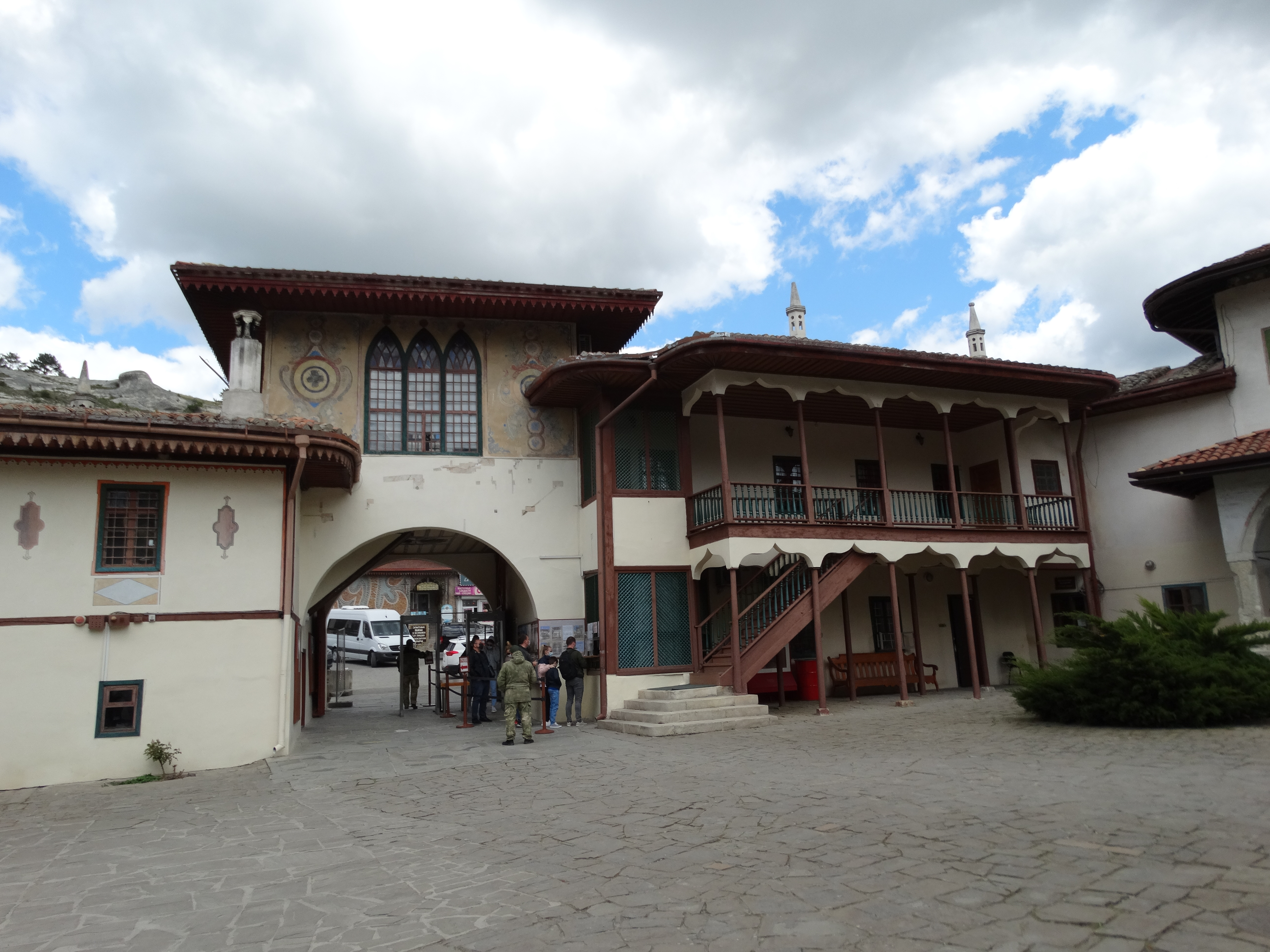

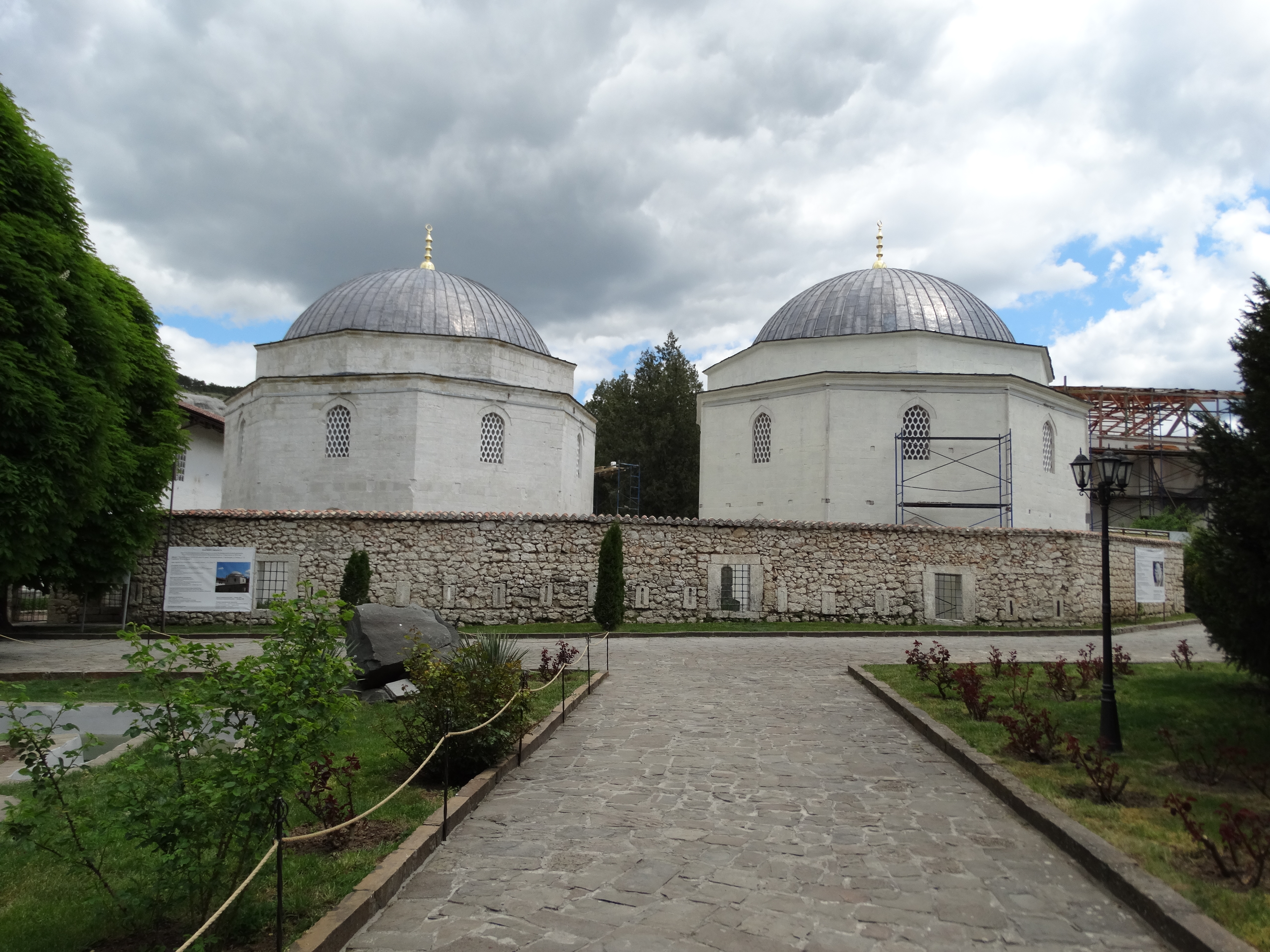

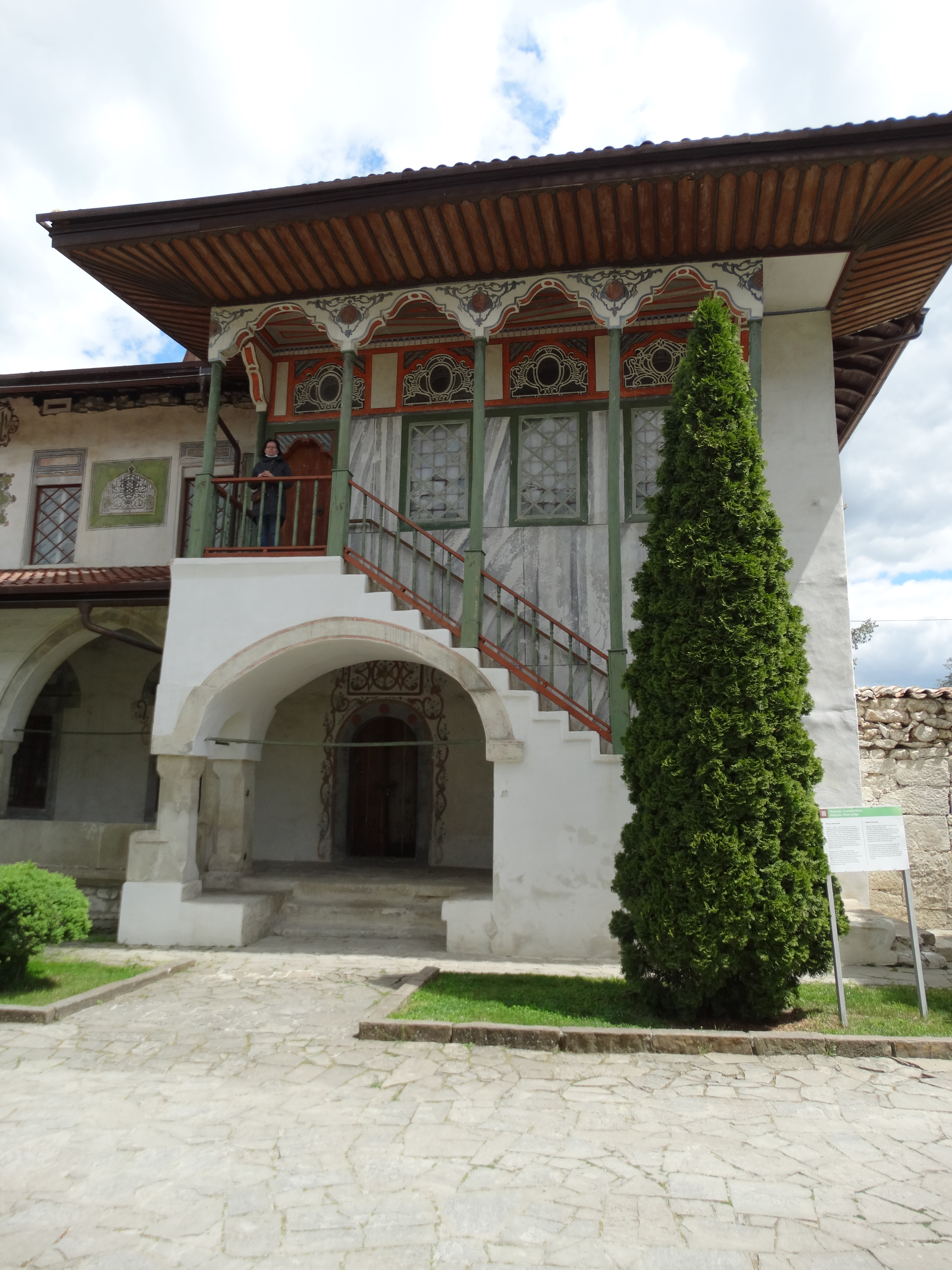

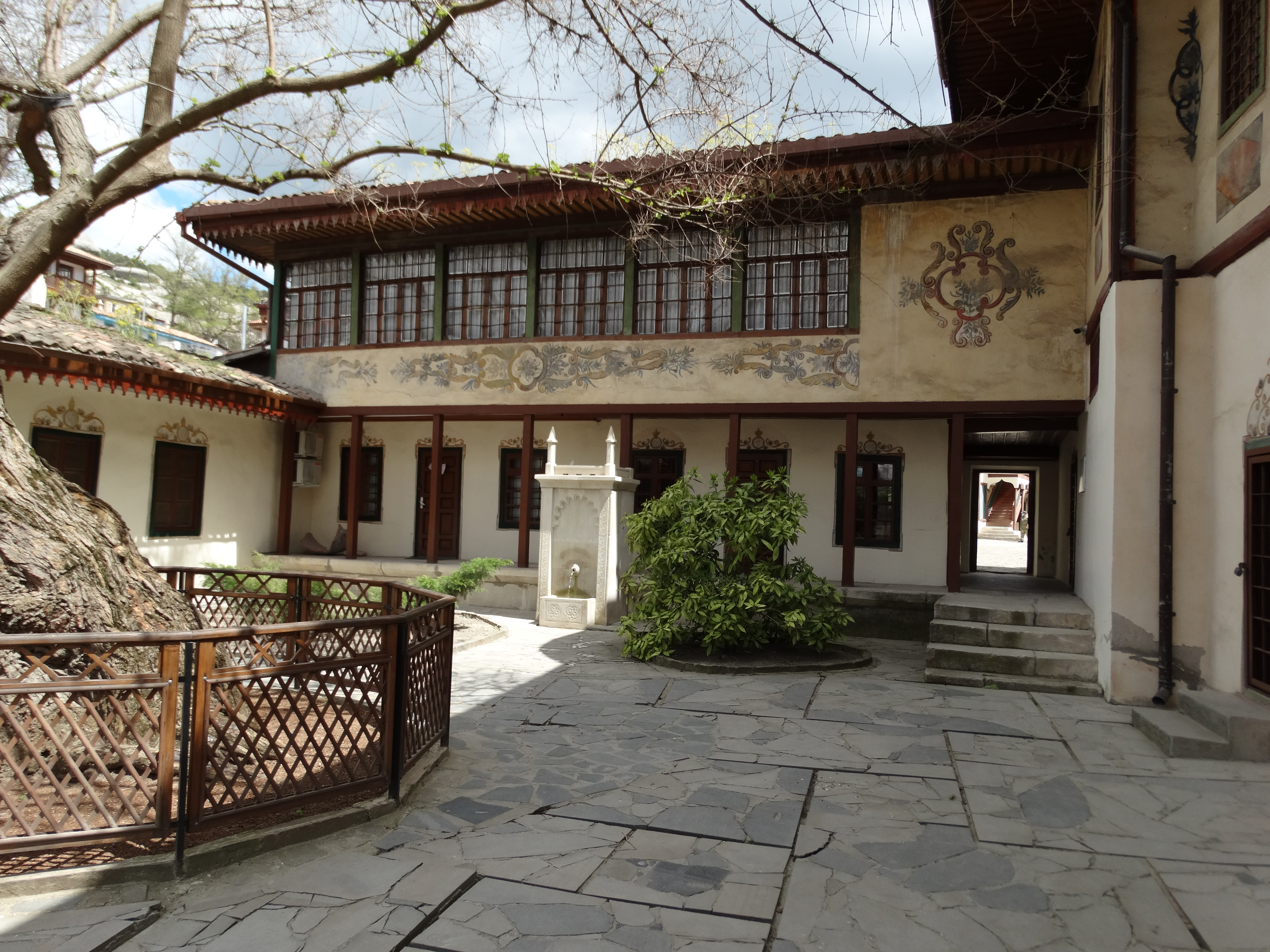

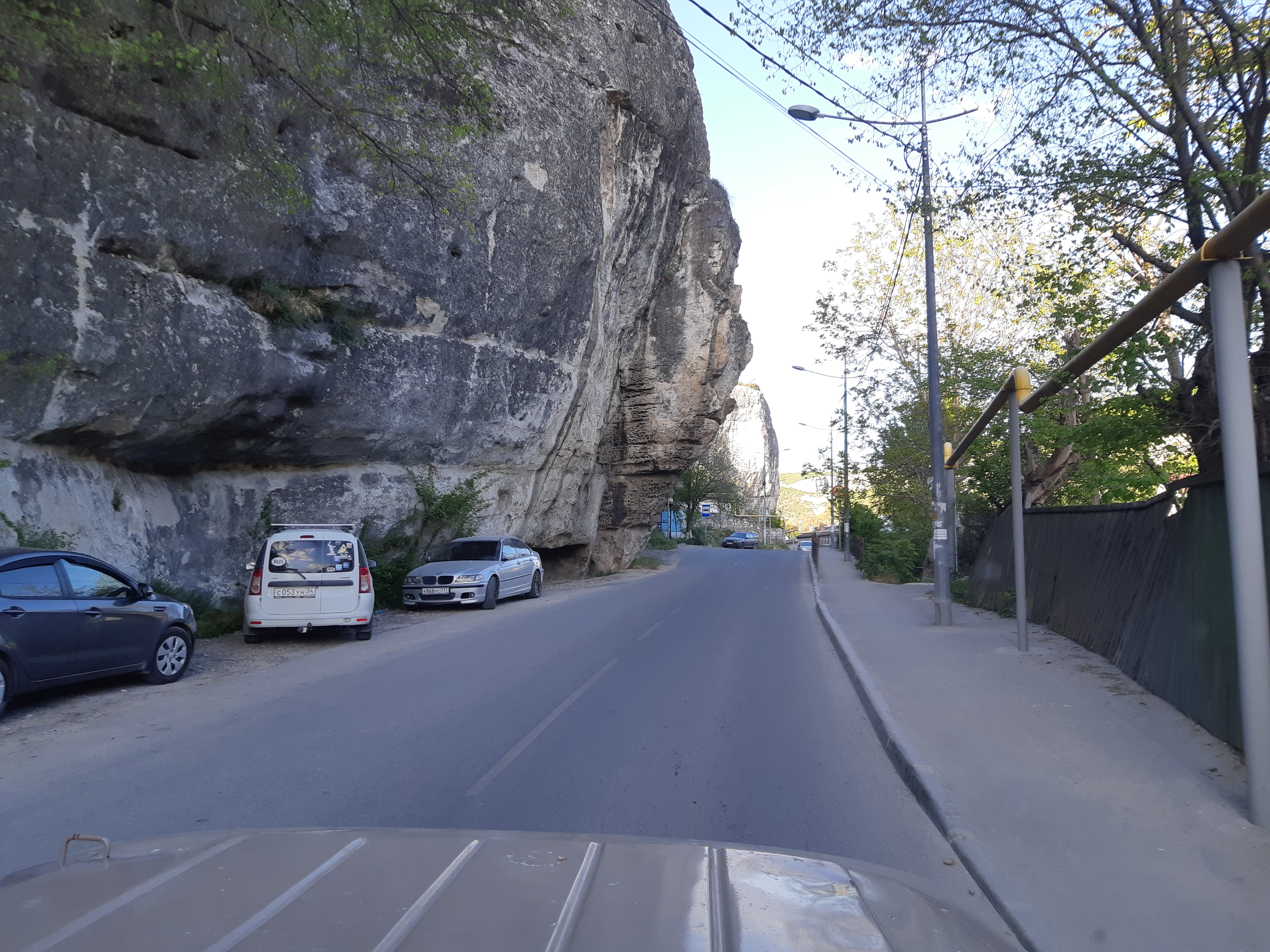

== Education ==
- College of Construction, Architecture and Design (Branch), Crimean Federal University

== International relations ==
=== Twin towns – Sister cities ===
Bakhchysarai is twinned with:

- Bursa, Turkey

== See also ==
- Bakhchysarai Palace
