= Erling von Mende =

German sinologist

Erling von Mende (born October 10, 1940) has been professor of Sinology at the FU Berlin since 1983. He is specialised in the social and economic history of the early Song dynasty to the end of the Qing dynasty.

== Biography ==
In 1969 von Mende gained a PhD in Sinology, economic history, Manchu Studies in Cologne. His 1971 dissertation was entitled Die wirtschaftlichen und konsulären Beziehungen Norwegens zu China von der Mitte des 19. Jhs. bis zum 1. Weltkrieg ("Economic and consular relations between Norway and China from the middle of the 19th century to the First World War").

Von Mende qualified as a university lecturer in 1979 in Cologne, specialising in Sinology and Manchu Studies. In 1982 he wrote a study, China und die Staaten auf der koreanischen Halbinsel bis zum 12. Jh.: Eine Untersuchung zur Entwicklung der Formen zwischenstaatlicher Beziehungen in Ostasien ("China and the states on the Korean peninsula until the 12th century: A study for the development of the forms of intergovernmental relations in Eastern Asia").

His father is Gerhard von Mende.
