= Zıncırlı medrese =

Zincirli Madrasa
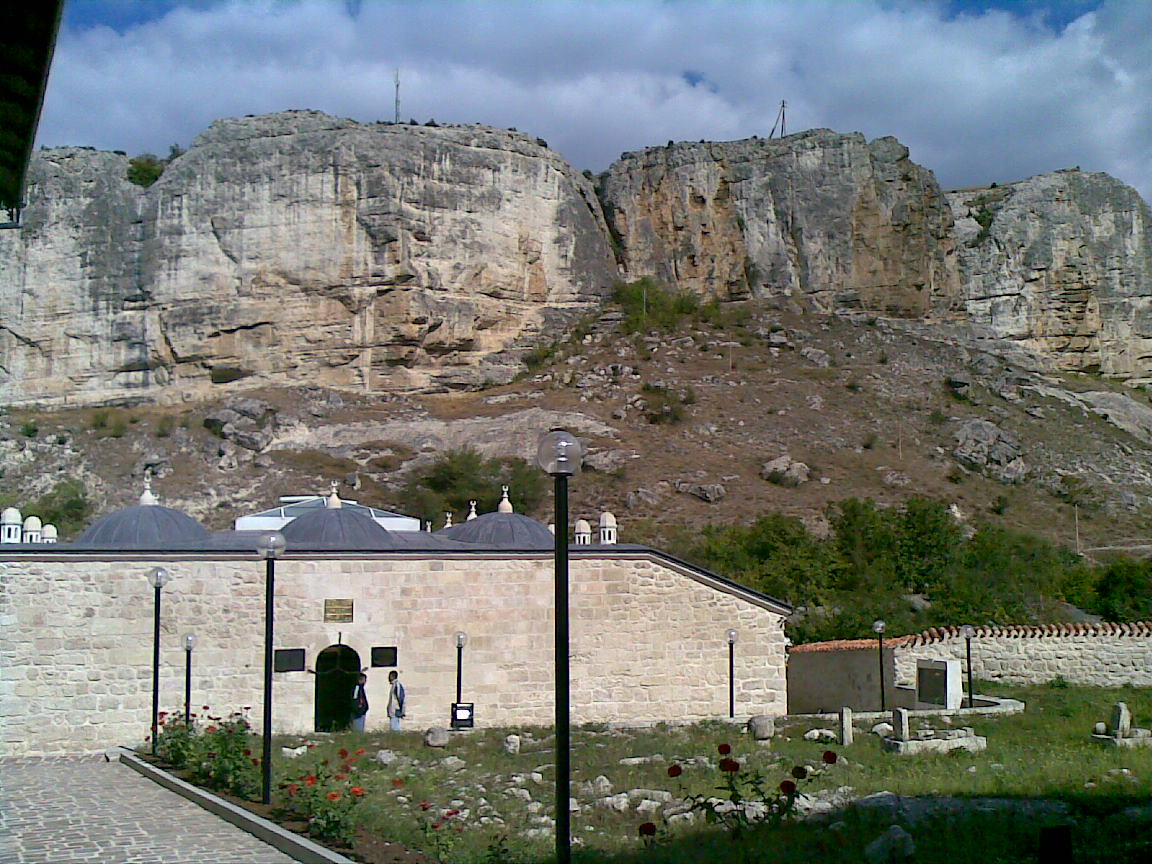

Religion
- Affiliation: Islam
- Region: Bakhchysarai Raion

Location
- Location: Bakhchysarai
- Interactive map of Zincirli Madrasa
- Territory: Crimea
- Coordinates: 44°44′52″N 33°54′28″E

Architecture
- Type: Madrasa
- Founder: Meñli I Giray
- Completed: 1500

Immovable Monument of National Significance of Ukraine
- Official name: Школа “Зинджирли медресе” (Zıncırlı Medrese school)
- Type: Architecture
- Reference no.: 010080

Zincirli Madrasa (Ukrainian: Зинджирли-медресе, Медресе Ланцюгів; Crimean Tatar: Zıncırlı medrese) is a madrasa, built of stone by Meñli I Giray in 1500 near Bakhchysarai, Crimea.

== History ==
Zincirli Madrasa was established in 1500 by Khan Meñli I Giray. It was a traditional Islamic school of higher learning and served generations of students until 1917, when it was turned into a medical school by the Bolshevik authorities. In 1939, the complex of buildings surrounding the Zincirli Madrasa became a mental hospital. After the return to their homeland, Crimean Tatars were able to gain control of the historic madrasa building.

The lost grave of Ismail Bey Gaspirali also lies within the madrasa compound and is represented by a symbolic grave marker. The madrasa takes its name from the large chain (zincir) that hangs over the entrance door.
