= Sürgün =

Ottoman practice of forced migration

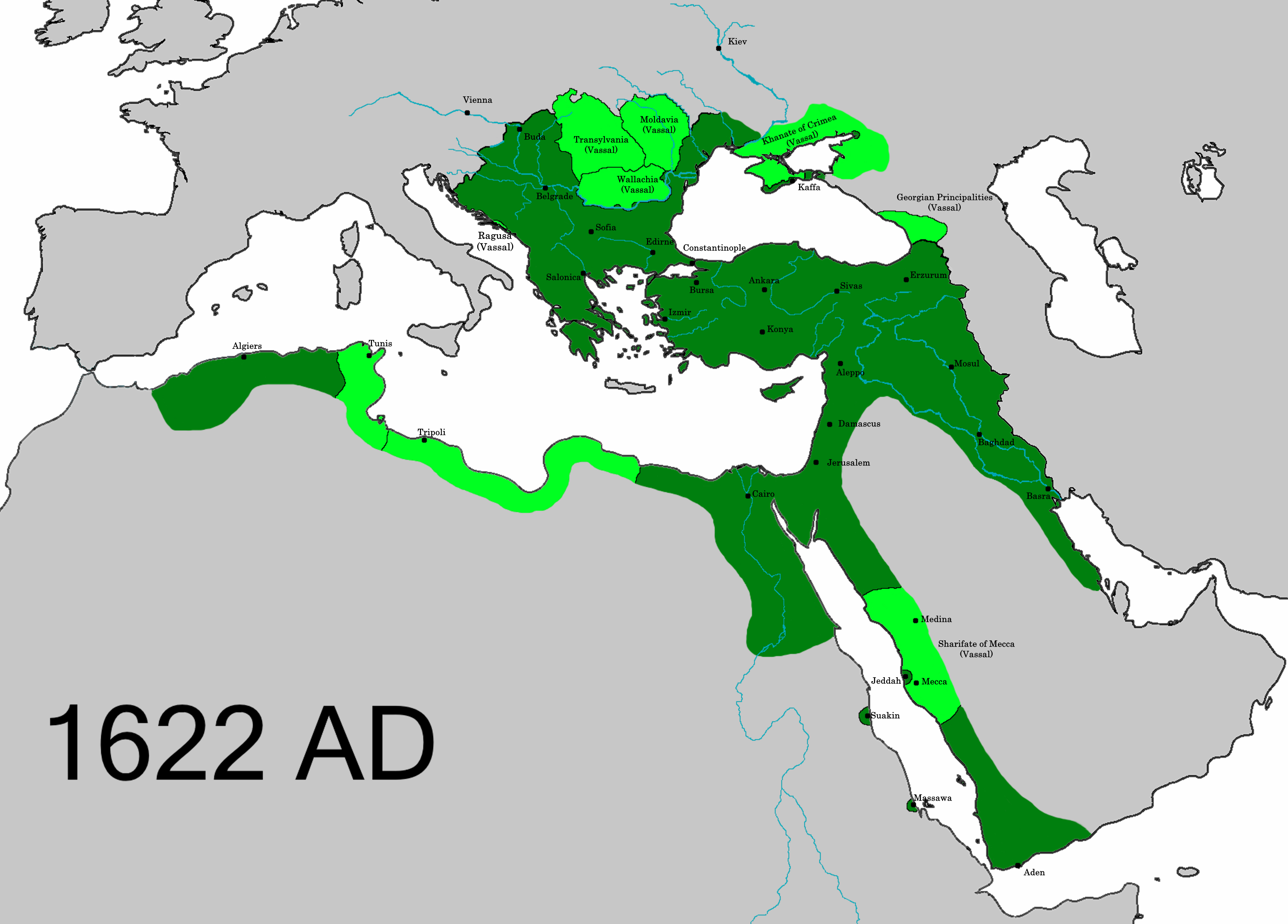
The Ottoman Empire in the early seventeenth century.

Sürgün or verb form sürmek (to displace) was a practice within the Ottoman Empire that entailed the movement of a large group of people from one region to another, often a form of forced migration imposed by state policy or international authority. The practice was also a form of banishment or exile often applied to the elites of Ottoman society, the Pashas. It was most famously used as a method to forcefully displace the native ethnic Armenians by the Young Turk government in 1915, in order to deal with a perceived threat from Armenian partisan groups receiving military support from the Ottoman hostile Russian Empire. These events are listed as one of the methods used to complete the Armenian genocide.

The practice was also used to enforce population exchanges such as the Balkan population exchanges in 1913 and the exchanges between the new Republic of Turkey and Greece in 1923.

== Exile as a tool ==
At its height, the Ottoman Empire spanned over the entirety of Anatolia and ruled over many different cultures and peoples. Mass migrations would often be used as a tool to settle political unrest and to bolster Ottoman presence in areas. During the expansionist reign of Mehmet I forced migration was used as a method of strengthening border regions and exerting influence in newly conquered areas. With Murad's takeover of Constantinople in 1453. Mehmet also brought in a large population from previous outlying Ottoman cities. In 1356 Sultan Orhan displaced a large group of "dark skinned Arab nomadic households" or "kara göçer arap evleri" to the newly subjugated region of Rumeli at the request of his son Suleiman Pasha, in order to better secure a fortress captured in Thrace so he could move forward. Movements like this where commonplace through the expansion of the empire.

== Within the sultanate ==
In the early period (from the 14th through the late 16th centuries), the Ottomans practiced open succession, or what historian Donald Quataert has described as "survival of the fittest, not eldest, son." During their father's lifetime, all of the adult sons of the reigning sultan would hold provincial governorships. Accompanied and mentored by their mothers, they would gather supporters while ostensibly following a Ghazw ethos. Upon the death of their father, the sons would fight among themselves until one emerged triumphant. How remote a province the son governed was of great significance. The closer the region that a particular son was in charge of the better the chances were of that son succeeding, simply because he would be told of the news of his father's death and be able to get to Constantinople first and declare himself Sultan. Thus a father could hint at whom he preferred by giving his favorite son a closer governorship.

== Exile and transfer (1300-1600) ==
Ottoman population transfers through the reign of Mehmet I (d. 1421) shuttled tribal Turkmen and Tatar groups from the state's Asiatic territories to the Balkans (Rumeli). Many of these groups were supported as paramilitary forces along the frontier with Christian Europe. Simultaneously, Christian communities were transported from newly conquered lands in the Balkans into Thrace and Anatolia. While these general flows back and forth across the Dardanelles continued, the reigns of Murad II (d. 1451) and Mehmet II (d. 1481) concentrated on the demographic reorganization of the empire's urban centers. Murad II's conquest of Salonika was followed by its state-enforced settlement by Muslims from Yenice Vardar and Anatolia. Mehmet II's transfers focused on the re-population of the city of Istanbul following its conquest in 1453, transporting Christians, Muslims, and Jews into the new capital from across the empire. To this day, the huge Belgrade Forest, to the north of Istanbul and named after re-settled people from Belgrade, is a reminder of those times.

Beginning in the reign of Bayezid II (d. 1512), the Ottoman state used to manage the difficulty with the heterodox Qizilbash (kizilbas) movement in eastern Anatolia. Forced relocation of the Qizilbash continued until at least the end of the 16th century. Selim I (d. 1520) ordered merchants, artisans, and scholars transported to Istanbul from Tabriz and Cairo. The state mandated Muslim immigration to Rhodes and Cyprus following their conquests in 1522 and 1571, respectively, and resettled Greek Cypriots on the Anatolia coast.

Knowledge on the practice throughout the 17th through the 19th century are vague though it seems that the state did not utilize population transfer as much during this time period as it had earlier.

== Armenian genocide ==
Armenian Genocide Map

The Armenian genocide entailed the forcible relocation of almost all Armenians from Anatolia to the Syrian desert. This relocation was inherently genocidal as those who ordered it did not intend for Armenians to survive; and one of their goals was to ensure in all parts of the empire Armenian population did not exceed 5 to 10 percent (a goal that could not be accomplished without mass extermination). Talat Pasha explained, "They can live in the desert but nowhere else."

In May 1915, Mehmed Talaat Pasha requested that the cabinet and Grand Vizier Said Halim Pasha legalize a measure for the deportation of Armenians to other places due to what Talaat Pasha called "the Armenian riots and massacres, which had arisen in a number of places in the country". However, Talaat Pasha was referring specifically to events in Van and extending the implementation to the regions in which alleged "riots and massacres" would affect the security of the war zone of the Caucasus Campaign. Later, the scope of the deportation was widened in order to include the Armenians in the other provinces. On 29 May 1915, the Central Committee passed the laws known as the Temporary Law of Deportation ("Tehjir Law"). These laws gave the Ottoman government and military authorization to deport anyone it "sensed" as a threat to national security.

The "Tehjir Law" brought with it some measures regarding the property of the deportees, but during September a new law was put forth. According to the new "Abandoned Properties" Law (Law Concerning Property, Dept's and Assets Left Behind Deported Persons, also referred as the "Temporary Law on Expropriation and Confiscation"), the Ottoman government took possession of all "abandoned" Armenian goods and properties. Some Ottoman parliamentary representatives like, Ahmed Riza protested this legislation:

It is unlawful to designate the Armenian assets as "abandoned goods" for the Armenians, the proprietors, did not abandon their properties voluntarily; they were forcibly, compulsorily removed from their domiciles and exiled. Now the government through its efforts is selling their goods ... If we are a constitutional regime functioning in accordance with constitutional law we can't do this. This is atrocious. Grab my arm, eject me from my village, then sell my goods and properties, such a thing can never be permissible. Neither the conscience of the Ottomans nor the law can allow it.

On 13 September 1915, the Ottoman parliament also passed the "Temporary Law of Expropriation and Confiscation", stating that all property, including land, livestock, and homes belonging to Armenians, was to be confiscated by the authorities.

== See also ==
- Ottoman dynasty
- Line of succession to the former Ottoman throne
- Demographic engineering
- Population transfer
- Population exchange between Greece and Turkey
