= Gerhard von Mende =

Nazi German theorist and scholar (1904–1963)

Gerhard von Mende (December 25, 1904 – December 16, 1963) was a Baltic German who was head of the Caucasus division at the Reich Ministry for the Occupied Eastern Territory, or Ostministerium, in Nazi Germany. He was a scholar on Asiatic and Muslim minorities within the Soviet Union and was considered the pioneer of mobilising them as a fifth column against the Communists, while being one of their staunchest advocates within Nazi Germany and post-war West Germany. Following World War II, he established the Research Service Eastern Europe through financing by the West German foreign office, a company which replicated his activities at the Ostministerium, becoming an intelligence asset for the CIA and BND.

== Early life ==
von Mende was born on December 25, 1904, in Riga, Latvia, the son of a banker. Following the invasion by the Soviet Union during the Latvian War of Independence, his father was rounded up with the bourgeoisie and executed. His mother and six siblings would flee to Germany, where he took an interest in studying oppressed minorities in Russia. He studied at Schulpforta from 1920 to 1923, and at the University of Berlin from 1927 to 1932, focusing on Russian, history, and Turkish. von Mende would attend the École Nationale des Langues Orientales Vivantes in Paris, and in 1933 he was awarded a doctorate from the University of Breslau for his writing "Studien zur Kolonization in der Sovietunion." Later he was awarded a doctorate in Slavic studies from the Wirtschaftshochschule Berlin. During this time he had become fluent in Russian, Latvian and French, as well as knowledgeable in Turkish and Arabic.

In 1934 he wrote "Die Völker der Sowjetunion," about the struggles of German minorities in the Soviet Union.

== Academia ==
After traveling through the Balkans following his studies, von Mende became a professor at multiple universities, including the University of Berlin in 1935, University of Posen, and University of Hamburg. During this time he wrote "Der nationale Kampf der Russlandtürken" in 1936, about the oppression of the Turkish minorities under Soviet rule.

== World War II ==
von Mende was an enthusiastic Nazi, who was Alfred Rosenberg's specialist on minorities in the Soviet Union. With the outbreak of World War II and subsequent invasion of the East by the Wehrmacht, von Mende was appointed head of the Caucasus division at the Reich Ministry for the Occupied Eastern Territory, although he kept his university position at the University of Berlin.

=== Creation of Fifth Columnists ===
Prisoners soon began flowing back West from the occupied territories, where up to a million volunteered for committees established by von Mende to integrate them into the Wehrmacht to fight the Soviet Union. These groups included Tatars, Turks, Georgians, Azerbaijanis, Chechens, Kazakhs, Uzbeks, and Armenians, as well as other non-Russian nationalities. Considered their "Lord-Protector", they were frequently invited into his home in Berlin for long dinners, and he worked with Claus Schenk Graf von Stauffenberg to provide them equal status in receiving care, compensation, quarters, and other measures. His work within the General Policy Office of the Reich Ministry for the Occupied Eastern Territory led to him being considered the pioneer of using minorities as a fifth column against the Communists in the Soviet Union. Some authors suggest von Mende was the origin of modern "Jihad" through his work at the Ministry.

== Post-war ==
With the war drawing to a close, von Mende worked through the bureaucracy to ensure that as many of the fifth columnists as possible were moved to the West to avoid capture by the Soviet Union, which would result in execution. Many were left stranded and destitute in Munich, whereby von Mende, faced with little employment prospects of his own with his Nazi past, decided to look after them. He wrote to the British Army explaining his vast intelligence sources on Soviet people, whereby interest was taken initially by them.

=== Research Service Eastern Europe ===
Eventually the West German foreign office would fund his company called the "Research Service Eastern Europe" in Düsseldorf, where von Mende would employee many former Nazis specializing in anti-Communist propaganda along with his fifth columnists. He managed to receive funding for the Muslims helping him through the West German government to help provide care and shelter for them. This operation was essentially a recreation of the Reich Ministry for the Occupied Eastern Territory. The main task of the RSEE was to ensure that the fifth columnist Muslims stayed under the control of the West German government, although during this time von Mende collaborated with the CIA.

=== Fallout with CIA ===
In 1956 von Mende increasingly became hostile toward the CIA following the creation of their front-group which would rival his RSEE, the American Committee for Liberation from Bolshevism. This group employed former Muslim Nazi Ibrahim Gacaoglu, who would also work for Radio Free Europe. von Mende however resented foreign interference with West German residents and believed that Muslims living in West Germany should be aligned with their operations. He brought in former Muslim S.S. officer Nurredin Nakibhodscha Namangani to be established as the Hauptimam of West Germany's Muslims, working on the payroll of the West German government.

In 1958 Namangani introduced an initiative called the Mosque Construction Commission, which eventually led to funding securing a home for the Muslims through the creation of a mosque in Munich.

However, by 1960, the commission in Munich had fallen under control of Said Ramadan, a U.S. asset and associate of Gacaoglu, who weakened the West German government's influence by introducing Munich as a center for European Muslims instead of just West German Muslims. Gacaoglu and the U.S. would use "new" revelations of the Holocaust to further weaken the credibility of von Mende and the RSEE, thus wrestling control of the fifth columnist Muslims from the West Germans in the end.

== Family and death ==
von Mende married Karo Espeseth, a Norwegian author, and had children, including Erling von Mende. von Mende died at his desk in Düsseldorf on December 16, 1963, of a heart attack.

== Bibliography ==
- Mende, Gerhard von (1933). Studien zur Kolonisation in der Sovetunion [Studies on colonisation in the Soviet Union] (in German). Breslau. OCLC 472801856.
- Mende, G. von (1936). Der nationale Kampf der Russlandtürken: ein Beitrag zur nationalen Frage in der Sovetunion [The national struggle of the Turkish population in Russia] (in German). Berlin. OCLC 474984341.
- von Mende, Gerhard (1944). "Sowjet-Föderalismus" [Soviet federalism]. Zeitschrift für Politik (in German). 34 (5–6): 149–156. ISSN 0044-3360. OCLC 7831301044.
- Mende, Gerhard von (1962). Nationalität und Ideologie [Nationality and Ideology] (in German). OCLC 256032126.
