= Provisional Muslim Revolutionary Committee =

Crimean Tatar nationalist organisation during the Russian Revolution

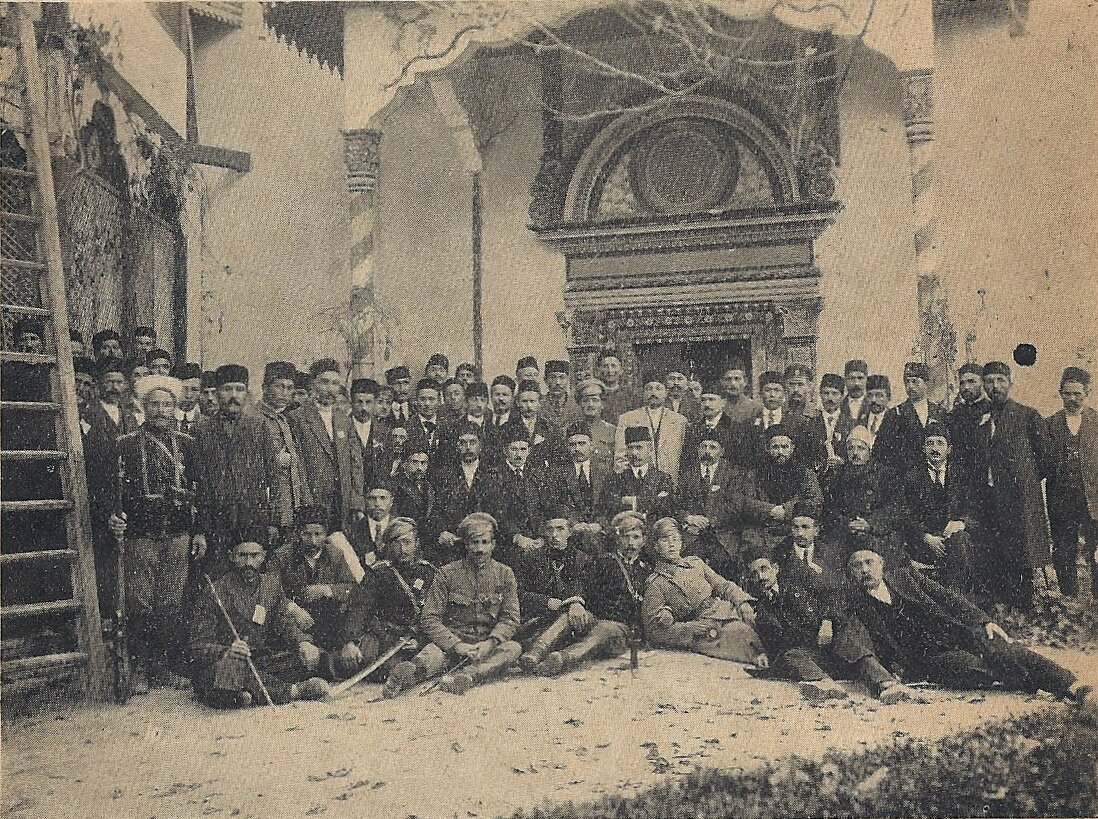
The Crimean People's Kurultai in 1917. The direct successor to the PMRC, the Kurultai shared many of its members, including Noman Çelebicihan and Asan Sabri Ayvazov

The Provisional Muslim Revolutionary Committee (Russian: Временный Крымско-Мусульманский исполком, romanized: Vremennyy Krymsko-Musul'manskiy ispolkom; abbreviated PMRC or Musispolkom) was an organisation in Crimea during the Russian Revolution, comprising Crimean Tatar nationalist figures. Meeting in March 1917, the PMRC, with support from the Russian Provisional Government and several Crimean Tatar intellectuals (among them Noman Çelebicihan, Cafer Seydamet Qırımer, and Asan Sabri Ayvazov, the founders of Milliy Firqa), the PMRC was seen as a first step towards the establishment of the Kurultai of the Crimean People's Republic.

== Background ==
The effects of the February Revolution sent shockwaves throughout the Russian Empire, and Crimea was no exception. Amidst the revolution, a protest of Crimean Tatars was held in the city of Simferopol, where a banner reading "Freedom, equality, fraternity, and justice!" was unfurled by protesters. In the revolution's chaotic aftermath, self-governing bodies emerged throughout the Crimean peninsula, and the Taurida Mohammedan Spiritual Administration was abolished by the Russian Provisional Government with the support of the Crimean Tatar people and intelligentsia. The Spiritual Administration had become unpopular among Crimean Muslims due to popular perception that it had betrayed Muslim values by selling off waqf lands and properties, as well as by its pro-Tsarist political positions.

== History ==
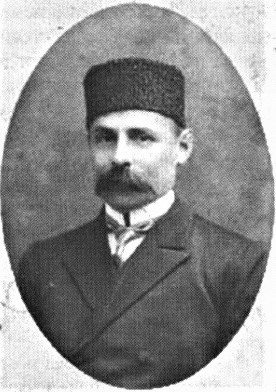
Seitсelil Hattat, organiser and chairman of the PMRC

In March 1917, as a result of the Crimean Tatar self-determination movement, Seitсelil Hattat organised the Provisional Muslim Revolutionary Committee, bringing together representatives of various sectors of Crimean Tatar society in the name of achieving sovereignty for Crimea. Acting with recognition and support from the Russian Provisional Government, the PMRC acted as a form of government in Crimea until the first Crimean People's Kurultai could be convened.

Early into its existence, the PMRC had already begun making significant progress on enacting policy. The primary goals of the committee were the organisation of the peninsula's various disorganised local entities into a singular government and encouraging participation in the upcoming 1917 Russian Constituent Assembly election. Other significant issues at the time included the remains of the Spiritual Administration, administration of waqfs, and educational reform.

The PMRC set forth an ambitious programme, including the right of all peoples to self-determination, the establishment of parliamentary democracy in Crimea, equality between the Russian, Ukrainian, and Crimean Tatar languages, and a referendum on adopting the Basic Law of Crimea in which participation would be mandatory. The PMRC programme also stressed the necessity of improving education, and proposed the creation of free and compulsory primary education in the Crimean Tatar language, which was intended to be apolitical. The efforts of the PMRC in ensuring the rights of Crimean Tatars had backing from the Ministry of Foreign Affairs of the Russian Provisional Government, which allowed Crimean Tatar authorities to seize control of religious, cultural, and educational institutions in the peninsula, including the management of waqfs.

Alongside the introduction of this programme, the PMRC, with the consent of the Simferopol garrison of the Russian Army, formed the Military Revolutionary Committee under the leadership of Memet Yenileyev. Though the original mission of the Military Revolutionary Committee was simply support for Crimean Tatar soldiers within the peninsula, its power quickly grew, and it became the de facto paramilitary wing of the PMRC.

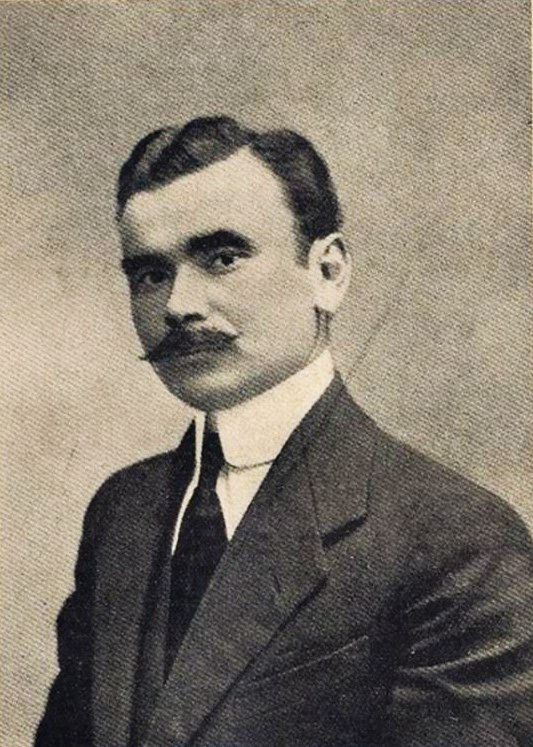
Noman Çelebicihan was active in promoting the PMRC's programme and goals

In May 1917, During a visit by Alexander Kerensky to Crimea, he was met by a delegation of Crimean Tatar politicians headed by Noman Çelebicihan. Among Çelebicihan's requests to Kerensky were the return of the Crimean Cavalry Regiment and organisation of a Crimean Tatar regiment. Following the meeting, Kerensky agreed to fulfil the requests, also promising to issue a memorandum addressing the government. However, only a month later, when a PMRC delegation visited the Provisional Government in Petrograd (now Saint Petersburg) and met with Georgy Lvov, they became convinced that Lvov was too incompetent to handle their issues, and instead elected to visit Kerensky, who was outside the city at the time.

In June 1917, the PMRC also formed two print organs; the Crimean Tatar-language Millet, which was a daily newspaper edited by Asan Sabri Ayvazov, and the Russian-language Tatar Voice, which was a weekly newspaper edited by Ali Bodaninskiy. Only a month later, the activities of the PMRC were significantly disrupted after Çelebicihan was arrested on charges of being an Ottoman agent. It was not until 7 August [O.S. 25 July] 1917 that he would be released.

The PMRC found significant support in the Central Council of Ukraine, and the Crimean Tatar delegation to the Congress of the Enslaved Peoples of Russia was headed by Amet Özenbaşlı, a leading member of the Milliy Firqa party.

Between 1 and 2 October 1917, at a congress of Crimean Tatar revolutionary organisations convened by the PMRC, and it was decided that the future of Crimea should be decided by an elected Kurultai. In the subsequent election held on 20 November 1917, which was boycotted by the Bolsheviks, Crimean Tatar and Ukrainian groups each received three seats compared to only two for the Russian majority. Following the Kurultai's convening on 26 November 1917 at the Bakhchisaray Palace, it took over the powers of the PMRC, and subsequently declared the creation of the Crimean People's Republic on 13 December 1917.

== Members ==
- Seitсelil Hattat – Organiser and chairman of the PMRC. Educator and politician.
- Noman Çelebicihan – Chairman of the Crimean Muslim Executive Committee. Politician, mufti, and writer. Co-founder of Milliy Firqa. Later President of the Crimean People's Republic.
- Cafer Seydamet Qırımer – Politician and ideologue, Co-founder of Milliy Firqa.
- Asan Sabri Ayvazov – Educator, politician, writer, and journalist. Co-founder of Milliy Firqa.
- Ayşe Ishaqova – Leader of the Crimean Tatar feminist movement.
