= Asan Sabri Ayvazov =

Crimean Tatar politician (1878–1938)

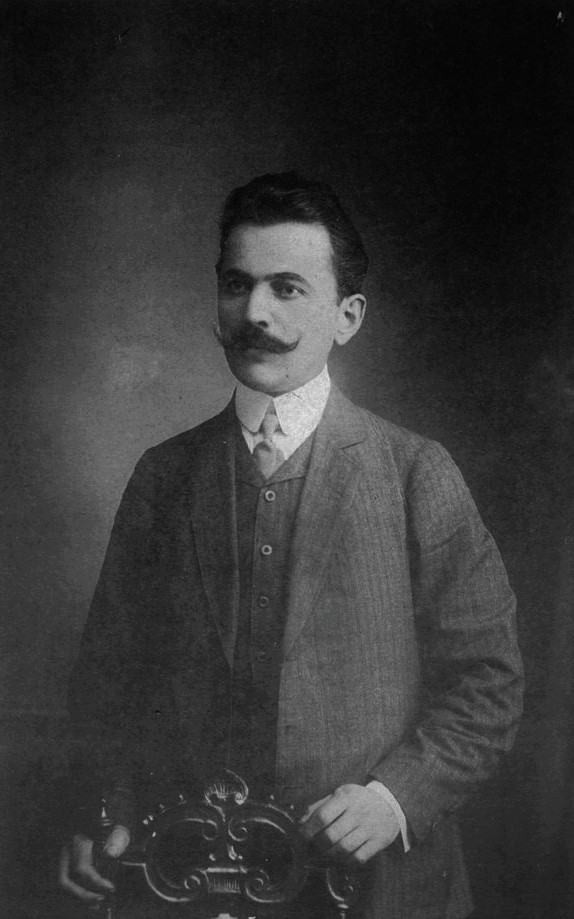
- Ayvazov in 1895.
- Born: 18 May 1878; Alupka, Russian Empire (now Crimea)
- Died: 17 April 1938 (aged 59); Simferopol, Crimean ASSR, Russian SFSR, Soviet Union (now Crimea)
- Years active: 1892–1927
- Political party: Socialist Revolutionary Party (until 1917); Milliy Fırqa (1917–1918)

Asan Sabri Ayvazov (18 May [O.S. 6 May] 1878 – 17 April 1938) was a Crimean Tatar politician, journalist, writer, educator, and pedagogue in the Russian Empire. Active from the early 1890s until the late 1920s, Ayvazov was a preeminent figure among the Crimean Tatar intelligentsia, and one of the leaders of the Crimean Tatar nationalist movement.

== Early life and career ==
Asan Sabri Ayvazov was born on 18 May 1878 into a poor peasant family in the city of Alupka in southern Crimea. In 1889, after graduating from elementary school, he was sent to live in Istanbul with his relatives. Here, he studied at the Istanbul Pedagogical Institute from 1892 to 1896. At this time, he was already active in the Crimean Tatar nationalist movement, publishing articles for Ismail Gasprinsky's Terciman newspaper in Istanbul and Baku.

In 1898, however, Ayvazov was arrested by the Ottoman police. When they discovered he was a citizen of the Russian Empire, he was deported back to Crimea.

== Mektebe-usul-jedid movement ==
Once he arrived in Crimea, Ayvazov opened a new school in his home city of Alupka based on the Jadid principles and the subsequent mektebe-usul-jedid movement of Ismail Gasprinsky. Unlike many other educational institutions in the peninsula at the time, which were based on sharia and other Islamic principles, Ayvazov promoted a secular form of education. Ayvazov's school allowed female students to be educated alongside males, and taught the Crimean Tatar language, arithmetic, geography, and grammar.

The public response to the mektebe-usul-jedid initiative was extremely negative. Ayvazov's "mektebe-usul-jedid" movement was opposed not only by the local Islamic clergy, but also the local elite and other Crimean Tatars. In 1904, he received an anonymous letter, which said, "Atheist! If you wish to die a natural death, then end the school. If you wish to be slain like a dog, continue your teaching."

The Russian police and school inspectors also opposed the mektebe-usul-jedid movement, albeit for different reasons. On one occasion, the district inspector of public schools arrived from Yalta and threatened Ayvazov with closure of his schools, saying, "If you teach other subjects besides the Quran, then we will take drastic measures."

In June 1904, following the death threat on Ayvazov, his home was attacked by unknown persons. A large stone hit his shoulder and the other his head, resulting in scars that remained for the rest of his life. Following this incident, he was forced to close the school and leave teaching. In the aftermath, he also left for Moscow, where he gave private lessons at the Lazarev Institute of Oriental Languages.

== Political activism ==
By the time he left for Moscow, Ayvazov was also chairman of Nejat. Founded in 1898, Nejat was a secret society with the aim of creating an independent and neutral state in Crimea, along the lines of Switzerland, under the auspices of Europe's great powers. Ayvazov served as the founding secretary of the organisation, with Asan Nuri serving as chairman. Following Nuri's death in 1903, Ayvazov became chairman. He would serve in this position until early 1907, when the organisation was cracked down on by the Russian police.

Nejat's press organ, Vatan Khadimi (lit. 'Servant of the Fatherland') was published four times a week in the city of Karasubazar (now Bilohirsk). The main publishers of the newspaper were Ayvazov and Abdureshid Mediyev, both members of the Socialist Revolutionary Party. Vatan Khadimi promoted the expansion of the mektebe-usul-jedid movement's schools, called rushdiye, and several were opened in many of Crimea's cities and large villages. The schools' teachers were primarily teachers from the Ottoman Empire or otherwise Ottoman-educated.

After the crackdown on Nejat, Vatan Khadimi and the rushdiyes were forced to close. Most of those teaching at rushdiyes were blocked from holding educational office, and some were expelled from Crimea, including Ayvazov, who was accused of anti-Tsarist agitation.

In 1907, Ayvazov published his play, Neden bu khale kaldyk? (lit. 'How did we get here?') in the Baku newspaper Feyuzat. Historian Viktor Filonenko later noted that the play was a seminal work of the Jadid movement, but also noted that it was not as progressively-minded as Gasprinsky's works, particularly in regards to the progressive nature of Islam and the status of women.

In early 1908, Ayvazov left Russia for Egypt, where he was treated for asthma, before returning to Moscow. According to Ayvazov himself, he was arrested on three occasions, and in 1911 left for Switzerland, where he by chance met Vladimir Lenin in Basel. Soon, however, he returned to Russia through Istanbul, where he returned to Moscow.

From his several trips between Russia and the Ottoman Empire, Ayvazov met several ideologues of the Pan-Turkist movement, among them Yusuf Akçura, Ali bey Huseynzade, Abdullah Subkhi, and Mehmet Emin Yurdakul. Along with these voices, he worked to create the Türk Dernegi organisation. Türk Dernegi, which later changed its name to Turk Ozhagi, and from there became a large part of the Committee of Union and Progress.

In late 1913, following the Romanov Tercentenary, Ayvazov was granted amnesty, and once again allowed to live in Crimea. Ayvazov moved to Bakhchysarai, where he once again served as an editor of Terciman until the February Revolution.

== February Revolution ==
Following the February Revolution, Ayvazov was elected as a member of the Provisional Muslim Revolutionary Committee, and sent to Petrograd (now Saint Petersburg) in preparation of the All-Russian Muslim Congress. During his absence, the All-Crimean Muslim Congress was held on 25 March 1917 and elected its Central Executive Committee. Ayvazov was elected in absentia as a member of the Central Executive Committee, and returned in April, though by his own account he preferred to "remain in the shadow" of the two men who had by then emerged as leaders of the movement, Noman Çelebicihan and Cafer Seydamet Qırımer.

Ayvazov was instructed by Çelebicihan and Seydamet Qırımer to travel to Simferopol, in central Crimea, and organise a printing house and newspaper to serve as organs of the Crimean nationalist movement. When the printing house was ready, Ayvazov was approved by the Central Executive Committee as its editor, and lent the organisation its name, Millet (lit. 'Nation'). Seydamet Qırımer served as chief editor.

From 10 May to 15 May 1917, Ayvazov, along with Çelebicihan and Seydamet Qırımer, served as one of the Crimean delegates to the All-Russian Muslim Congress (held in Moscow), and he later credited the Congress as "the father of all Turko-Tatar nationalist organisations or parties in Russia." Upon their return, they established the nationalist Milliy Fırqa party in July 1917, and adopted a programme in November 1917 including national cultural autonomy for the Crimean Tartars and envisioning eventual secession of Crimean Tartars and the creation of an independent state under the protection of European powers.

In the Crimean People's Republic, Ayvazov was twice elected chairman of the People's Kurultai, in January and May 1918. At the same time, he served as ambassador of the Crimean People's Republic to the Ottoman Empire.

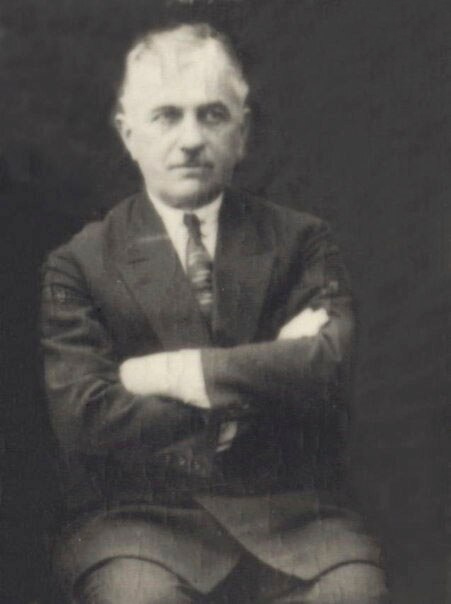
Ayvazov in his later years.

== Later life and death ==
After the Soviets took control of Crimea, Ayvazov returned to educational pursuits, working at V. I. Vernadsky Taurida National University as a senior assistant and the Crimean Tatar Pedagogical Institute, where he taught the Arabic and Turkish languages. He remained a significant figure among Crimean Tatars, and was a strong supporter of latinisation in the Soviet Union, particularly of the Crimean Tatar alphabet. In 1925, he was also elected as a member of the Taurida Society of History, Archaeology and Ethnography.

In 1930, Ayvazov was arrested. Two months later, however, he was released and sent to Kislovodsk, where he received medical treatment. Under duress, he agreed to cooperate with the Joint State Political Directorate in detailing information about the Crimean national movement to the Soviet government. Following his release, he moved to Simferopol, where he again became a teacher.

Ayvazov illegally sent several letters to Cafer Seydamet Qırımer, who was in exile in Turkey, in the years prior to his death. According to these letters, he was very fearful of future events, and pleaded for assistance in fleeing the country:

My situation is extremely difficult. To stay here a little longer is to die or be killed. I'm not afraid of death - I'm afraid of being secretly killed like a dog. If I was afraid of death or torment, I would have left here long ago, in those days when it was easy to leave the country. But I, left alone, began to fulfil my task 35 years ago. And now, there is no way to stay here. I'm in danger. For the first time in my life, I'm asking for help. Get me out of here quickly. Don't kill me by leaving me here in a desperate position. Prove that you are my brother and friend.

— June 1934 letter to Seydamet Qırımer

=== Death ===
On 5 April 1937, Ayvazov was arrested in his apartment in Simferopol. He was accused of espionage, with the prosecutor's office accusing him of being recruited by the French Deuxième Bureau and Turkish National Security Service and pursuing counter-revolutionary activities. On 17 April 1938, he was found guilty and sentenced to execution by firing squad and confiscation of all personal property. He was executed the same day. Twenty two years later, on 21 January 1960, amidst the Khrushchev Thaw, Ayvazov was found innocent on all charges and rehabilitated.
