= Nimchenko =

Nimchenko is a surname. Notable people with the surname include:

- Ihor Nimchenko (born 1998), Ukrainian para swimmer
- Yury Nimchenko (born 1980), Ukrainian-born Russian military officer and politician
