= Glory to Crimea, Our Ancestral Home =

Regional anthem of the Republic of Crimea

Государственный гимн Республики Крым
English: "State Anthem of the Republic of Crimea"
- Coat of arms of Republic of Crimea
- Regional anthem of the Republic of Crimea
- Also known as: Славься, Крым, отчий дом (English: Glory to Crimea, Our Ancestral Home)
- Lyrics: Ilya Reznik
- Music: Olga Kovitidi, 2014
- Adopted: 22 August 2025
- Preceded by: Anthem of the Autonomous Republic of Crimea

Glory to Crimea, Our Ancestral Home, officially the State Anthem of the Republic of Crimea is the regional anthem of the Republic of Crimea, a disputed republic of Russia. Its lyrics were written by the poet Ilya Reznik, and the music was composed by former Russian Senator, Olga Kovitidi.

On 22 August 2025, it replaced the Anthem of the Autonomous Republic of Crimea (Your fields and mountains are magical, o Motherland) as the anthem of Russian occupied Crimea, while it is still used by the Autonomous Republic of Crimea claimed by Ukraine.

== History ==
The idea of changing the anthem was proposed by Vladimir Konstantinov, the chairman of the State Council of Crimea due to the previous anthem not reflecting the realities in the peninsula after 2014.

In November 2024, a competition was announced for the selection of a new anthem for the Republic of Crimea. A total of 122 proposals were submitted for consideration, of which 94 met the requirements and regulations. Proposals were sent in from regions as far as Moscow, Saint Petersburg, Krasnodar Krai, Tatarstan, Barnaul, and other regions. Members of the competition commission listened to all submissions and gave a rating. The three options that scored the most amount of points were then put to an open vote by the commission. The competition concluded in June 2025.

On National Flag Day, August 22, 2025, the Crimean Parliament in a special session approved and adopted the new anthem with a unanimous vote in favor by all 62 deputies present.

The anthem's melody was written by Olga Kovitidi during the Russian annexation of Crimea in 2014 for the song "Crimea Has Returned Home" (Russian: Крым вернулся домой).

== Lyrics ==
Russian

I
Славься, Крым, отчий дом,
Мир Тавриды любимый!
Пусть Всевышний хранит
Крым наш непобедимый!
Подвиг наших отцов
Растоптать мы не дали,
За Великую Русь
Всем народом стояли!

Припев:
Крым вернулся домой,
Все преграды минуя,
Светлой Крымской весной
В свою гавань родную,
Под покровом святым,
Полный праведной силы,
Героический Крым –
Честь и гордость России!

II
Славься, в мире живи,
Крым наш неповторимый!
Все народы твои
В процветанье едины!
Славим доблестный труд
И твоё возрожденье.
Здесь в согласье живут
Все твои поколенья!

Припев

III
Славься, Крым, наш оплот,
Крым, священный по праву!
Черноморский форпост –
Щит надёжный Державы!
С нами слава страны
И Победное знамя.
Мы России верны,
И любовь её с нами!

Припев

Ukrainian

I
Слався, Крим, отчий будинок,
Світ Тавриди коханий!
Нехай Всевишній зберігає
Крим наш непереможний!
Подвиг наших батьків
Розтоптати ми не дали,
За Велику Русь
Всім народом стояли!

Приспів:
Крим повернувся додому,
Всі перешкоди минаючи,
Світлою Кримською весною
У свою рідну гавань,
Під покровом святим,
Повний праведної сили,
Героїчний Крим -
Честь та гордість Росії!

II
Слався, у світі живи,
Крим наш неповторний!
Усі народи твої
У процвітання єдині!
Славимо доблесну працю
І твоє відродження.
Тут у згоді живуть
Усі твої покоління!

Приспів

III
Слався, Крим, наш оплот,
Крим, священний по праву!
Чорноморський форпост
Щит надійний Держави!
З нами слава країни
І Переможний прапор.
Ми Росії вірні,
І кохання її з нами!

Приспів

Crimean Tatar

I
Шуретлер олсун Къырымгъа, бизим батанымызгъа,
Тавриданынъ севимли тынчлыгъы!
Юдже Тааля къорчаласын
Енъильмез Къырымымыз!
Биз бабаларымызнынъ джесюрлигине ёл бермедик
тапталмакъ,
Буюк Рус ичюн'
Бутюн халкъымызнен берабер турдыкъ!

Хор:
Къырым эвине къайтты,
Бутюн маниаларны айланып кечип,
Парлакъ Къырым баарьде
Озь догъгъан лиманына,
Мукъаддес къорчалав алтында,
Инсафлы къудретке толу,
Къараман Къырым
Русиенинъ шерефи ве гъуруры!

II
Къырымгъа шуретлер олсун, раат яшанъыз,
Бизим текрарланмаз Къырымымыз!
Бутюн халкъларынъ
Рефахта бирлешинъиз!
Биз сенинъ джесюр эмегинъни шуретлеймиз
Ве сенинъ янъыдан догъгъанынъ.
Мында муаббет яшанъыз
Бутюн несиллеринъиз!

Хор

III
Шуретлер олсун Къырымгъа, бизим къалемиз,
Къырым, акъ иле мукъаддес!
Къара денъиз заставасы
Девлетнинъ ишанчлы къалкъаны!
Юртнынъ шаны бизим янымызда
Ве Гъалип байрагъы.
Биз Русиеге садыкъмыз,
Ве онынъ севгиси бизимнен!

Хор

English

I
Glory to Crimea, Our Ancestral Home,
Beloved land of Taurida!
May the Almighty protect
our invincible Crimea!
We didn't let the feat of our fathers
To be trampled,
For Great Rus'
We stood with all our people!

Chorus:
Crimea has returned home,
Overcoming all obstacles,
In the bright Crimean spring
To its native harbor,
Under the holy protection,
Full of righteous strength,
Heroic Crimea:
The honor and pride of Russia!

II
Glory to you, live in peace,
Our unique Crimea!
All your peoples
Are united in prosperity!
We praise valiant labor
And your rebirth.
Here, in harmony, live
All your generations!

Chorus

III
Glory to Crimea, our stronghold,
Crimea, sacred by right!
The Black Sea outpost:
The reliable shield of the state!
The nation's glory is with us
And the Victory Banner.
We are loyal to Russia,
And her love is with us!

Chorus
