= State Anthem of Crimea =

Regional anthem of Crimea

- Sheet music
- Rregional anthem of the Autonomous Republic of Crimea
- Also known as: «Нивы и горы твои волшебны, Родина» (English: Magical Are Thy Fields and Mountains, Motherland)
- Lyrics: Olga Golubeva
- Music: Alemdar Karamanov
- Adopted: 2000

Audio sample
- "Hymn of Crimea": file; help

The State Anthem of Crimea is the regional anthem of Autonomous Republic of Crimea, a de jure administrative division of Ukraine. Its Russian-language text was written by Olga Golubeva, and the music was composed by Alemdar Karamanov. The anthem was selected in a contest held by the Verkhovna Rada of Crimea on 26 February 1992, and it was officially adopted on 18 October 2000.

Crimea was unilaterally annexed by Russia in 2014 and is administered as the Republic of Crimea. The Republic of Crimea continued to use the State Anthem of Crimea until 2025 when it was relinquished and replaced by a new anthem titled "Glory to Crimea, Our Ancestral Home".

== Lyrics ==
The Russian, Ukrainian, and Crimean Tatar languages are recognized by both governments as official languages of Crimea.

Russian lyrics

Нивы и горы твои волшебны, Родина,
Солнце и море твои целебны, Родина.
Эту землю мы сохраним
И внукам оставим цветущий, как сад, Крым,
Цветущий, как сад, Крым!

Зори свободы тебя согрели, Родина,
Братья-народы тебя воспели, Родина.
Эту землю мы сохраним
И вместе, крымчане, прославим в веках Крым,
Прославим в веках Крым!

Славься, Крым!

Romanization

Nivy i gory tvoi volšebny, Rodina,
Solnce i more tvoi celebny, Rodina.
Etu zemlju my sohranim
I vnukam ostavim cvetuščij, kak sad, Krym,
Cvetuščij, kak sad, Krym!

Zori svobody tebja sogreli, Rodina,
Bratia-narody tebja vospeli, Rodina.
Etu zemlju my sohranim
I vmeste, krymčane, proslavim v vekah Krym,
Proslavim v vekah Krym!

Slavsja, Krym!

Ukrainian lyrics

Ниви і гори твої чарівні, Батьківщино,
Сонце і море твої цілющі, Батьківщино.
Цю землю ми збережімо
І онукам залишімо квітучий, як сад, Крим,
Квітучий, як сад, Крим!

Зорі волі тебе зігріли, Батьківщино,
Брати-народи тебе оспівали, Батьківщино.
Цю землю ми збережімо
І разом, кримчани, прославімо в століттях Крим,
Прославімо в століттях Крим!

Слався, Криме!

Romanization

Nyvy i hory tvoi čarivni, Baťkivščyno,
Sonce i more tvoi ciliušči, Baťkivščyno.
Ciu zemliu my zberežimo
I onukam zalyšimo kvitučyj, jak sad, Krym,
Kvitučyj, jak sad, Krym!

Zori voli tebe zihrily, Baťkivščyno,
Braty-narody tebe ospivaly, Baťkivščyno.
Ciu zemliu my zberežimo
I razom, krymčany, proslavimo v stolittiach Krym,
Proslavimo v stolittiach Krym!

Slavsia, Kryme!

Crimean Tatar version

Сенинъ тарлаларынъ ве дагъларынъ тюркюлидир, Ватан,
Сенинъ кюнешинъ ве денъизинъ шифалыдыр, Ватан.
Бу топракъны биз тутарыз
Ве торунларгъа джыярыз багъча киби чичек ачгъан Къырымы,
Багъча киби чичек ачгъан Къырымы!

Азатлыкъ тирлери сени иситты, Ватан,
Къардаш халкълар сени дедилер, Ватан.
Бу топракъны биз тутарыз
Ве бир йерде, къырымлылар, сени макътарыз юзйылларда, Къырым,
Макътарыз юзйылларда Къырымы!

Мешур ол, Къырым!

Romanization

Seniñ tarlalarıñ ve dağlarıñ türkülidir, Vatan,
Seniñ küneşiñ ve deñiziñ şifalıdır, Vatan.
Bu topraqnı biz tutarız
Ve torunlarğa cıyarız bağça kibi çiçek açğan Qırımı,
Bağça kibi çiçek açğan Qırımı!

Azatlıq tirleri seni isittı, Vatan,
Qardaş halqlar seni dediler, Vatan.
Bu topraqnı biz tutarız
Ve bir yerde, qırımlılar, seni maqtarız yüzyıllarda, Qırım,
Maqtarız yüzyıllarda Qırımı!

Meşur ol, Qırım!

=== English translation ===
Magical are thy fields and mountains, Motherland,
Healful are thy sun and sea, Motherland.
We shall preserve this land
And pass down Crimea, like a garden blooming, to our descendants –
Like a garden blooming, Crimea!

The dawns of freedom warmed thee, Motherland,
Brotherly nations glorified thee, Motherland.
We shall preserve this land
And together, Crimeans, we shall glorify Crimea for centuries –
We shall glorify Crimea for centuries!

Glory to Crimea!

== See also ==
- "Ant etkenmen", the anthem of the Crimean Tatars
- "Ey Güzel Qırım", a popular Crimean folk song
- Flag of Crimea
- Coat of arms of Crimea
