= Cafer Seydahmet Kırımer =

Crimean Tatar politician and writer

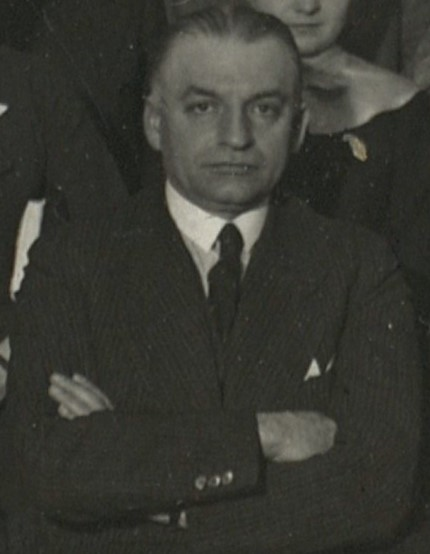
- Cafer Seydahmet Kırımer in 1936

Prime Minister of the Crimean People's Republic
- In office 13 December 1917 – 28 January 1918
- President: Noman Çelebicihan
- Preceded by: Position established
- Succeeded by: Position abolished (Maciej Sulkiewicz as Prime Minister of the Crimean Regional Government)

Director of Foreign and Military Affairs of the Crimean People's Republic
- In office 13 December 1917 – 28 January 1918
- President: Noman Çelebicihan
- Prime Minister: Himself
- Preceded by: Position established
- Succeeded by: Position abolished (Himself as Minister of Foreign Affairs of the Crimean Regional Government)

Minister of Foreign Affairs of the Crimean Regional Government
- In office 25 June 1918 – 25 November 1918
- Prime Minister: Maciej Sulkiewicz
- Preceded by: Position established (Himself as Director of Foreign and Military Affairs of the Crimean People's Republic)
- Succeeded by: Maxim Vinaver

Personal details
- Born: Cafer Seydamet; 1 September 1889 Qızıltaş, Taurida Governorate, Russian Empire (now Krasnokamianka, Crimea)
- Died: 3 April 1960 (aged 70) Istanbul, Turkey
- Party: Milliy Firqa

Cafer Seydahmet (1 September 1889 – 3 April 1960), also known by his adopted surname Kırımer was a Crimean Tatar politician and writer who was one of the founders and leaders of Milliy Firqa and Crimean People's Republic. He served as Prime Minister and Director of Foreign and Military Affairs in the Crimean People's Republic, and maintained the latter role within the Crimean Regional Government.

== Biography ==
Cafer Seydahmet was born into a family of wealthy peasants on 1 September 1889. After receiving primary education in Crimea, he travelled to Istanbul, then part of the Ottoman Empire, to achieve higher education at the Istanbul University Faculty of Law. In Istanbul, he met Noman Çelebicihan, then also a student, and in 1908 founded the Crimean Tatar Students' Association along with Çelebicihan and multiple other Crimean Tatar students.

In 1911, Seydahmet published an essay, titled The Oppressed Crimean Tatar Nation in the 20th Century. Following the publishing of this essay, the government of the Russian Empire began to seek Seydahmet's extradition. To avoid arrest, he travelled to Paris and enrolled at the University of Paris. There, he studied social sciences, journalism, and law. In 1914, following the completion of his studies in Paris, he returned to Russia and enrolled at the Saint Petersburg State University, where he again met Çelebicihan.

Following the outbreak of World War I, Seydahmet returned to Crimea, and began to establish cells to plot the independence of Crimea from Russian rule. However, following his conscription into the Imperial Russian Army, these plans were halted. Seydahmet was sent to a cadet school, and later deployed to a reserve regiment in Izmail.

Throughout the process leading up to the declaration of the Crimean People's Republic on 13 December 1917, Seydahmet was extensively active in Crimean Tatar political affairs. He was a leading member of the Provisional Muslim Revolutionary Committee, and helped to edit the newspaper Millet, and served as a member of the Directory. In September 1917, together with Amet Özenbaşlı, he was part of a Crimean Tatar delegation to the Congress of the Enslaved Peoples of Russia. Following the declaration of the Crimean People's Republic, Seydahmet was appointed as Director of Foreign and Military Affairs.

Following the Crimean declaration of independence, there was only one Crimean regiment, the Crimean Cavalry Regiment. According to the memoirs of Pyotr Wrangel, he was offered control over the nascent Crimean military forces by Seydahmet, but refused the offer:

Following the example of the Don and Ukraine, in the face of the impending red wave, the Crimean Tatars also decided to organize themselves in the figure of a Kurultay [...] Democratic politics prevailed, the prime representative of which was the Prime Minister and Minister of War Seydahmet, following the example of Mr. Kerensky, also from lawyers. Seydahmet, in addition to democratic elements, was also nominated by the Turkophile group. The government also had a handful of armed forces at its disposal - the Crimean Dragoon Regiment, staffed by Crimean Tatars, several officer companies, it seems, two field batteries [...] Politics turned out to be coloured by typical Kerenskyism [...] From the very first words of my meeting with Seydahmet, I was convinced that there was no way.

— Pyotr Wrangel, Notes, Book I, chapter I

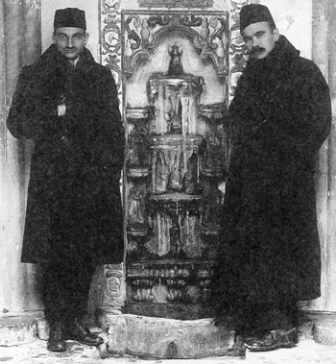
Cafer Seydahmet, on left, with Noman Çelebicihan at the Bakhchisaray Palace, 1918

Following clashes in January 1918, the Crimean People's Republic was overtaken by the forces of the Taurida Soviet Socialist Republic. Çelebicihan was killed, and Seydahmet fled north to Kyiv. However, only shortly after the destruction of the Crimean People's Republic, German forces invaded Crimea and established the Crimean Regional Government under the leadership of Maciej Sulkiewicz. Seydahmet returned to the peninsula and was appointed Minister of Foreign Affairs in the new government. During his time as Minister of Foreign Affairs, Seydahmet was involved in attempts to negotiate a deal with Pavlo Skoropadskyi for recognition of the Crimean Regional Government's independence. Following the German withdrawal from Crimea, however, Sulkiewicz's government fell, and Seydahmet fled Crimea for Istanbul.

In Istanbul, Seydahmet was an early supporter of Mustafa Kemal Atatürk, and founded a newspaper, named Emel. He also participated in the transfer of several historical items belonging to Crimean Tatars. However, this stay in Turkey would be short-lived - he was deported in 1920 by Ottoman authorities. From Istanbul, he moved to Lausanne, Switzerland. In October of the same year, he met with Józef Piłsudski, with whom he discussed Prometheism. Seydahmet later became an active supporter of Prometheism.

In April 1922, Seydahmet returned to Turkey, hoping to use his good relations with Atatürk's government (which had close relations with the Soviets) in order to assist Crimean Tatars suffering from the 1921–1923 famine in Ukraine. Seydahmet's return to Istanbul drew attention, as the city was then under occupation by the Western Allies, and Turkey was in the midst of a war against Greece. As a result of his efforts, in addition to those of a delegation from Soviet Crimea, the Turkish Red Crescent sent 1,000 bags of flour to Crimea to help alleviate the famine.

Following the conclusion of the Russian Civil War, Seydahmet remained active in promoting Crimean Tatar nationalism. At a meeting of the Prometheist movement in January 1930 in Warsaw, he drew comparisons between the Soviet Union and the Russian Empire, accusing them of using the same tactics in attempting to harm the Crimean Tatar people. In 1934, a group of his supporters organised a celebration of his 25 years of political activity in Dobruja. The same year, Seydahmet adopted the descriptive surname Qırımer (Turkish: Kırımer, lit. 'Crimean Man') following the adoption of the Surname Law.

In 1941, Seydahmet, in addition to Mustafa Szynkiewicz and Müstecib Ülküsal, travelled to Nazi Germany in an unsuccessful attempt to achieve German support in establishing an independent Crimean Tatar state. In spite of these attempts, Seydahmet remained opposed to Nazism, and maintained close ties to the Polish government-in-exile in London.

Cafer Seydahmet Kırımer died in Istanbul on 3 April 1960.

== Citations ==
- T. Bykova, Seydamet Cafer // Encyclopedia of the History of Ukraine: in 10 volumes / Editor: V. A. Smoliy (head) and others; Institute of the History of Ukraine of the National Academy of Sciences of Ukraine . — K.: Naukova Dumka, 2012 — Vol. 9: Add. — S. — S. 506. — 944 pages — ISBN 978-966-00-1290-5
- V. Golovchenko, Seydamet Cafer // Ukrainian Diplomatic Encyclopaedia: In 2 vols. / Editor: L. V. Huberskyi (head) and others. — K.: Knowledge of Ukraine, 2004 — Volume 2 — 812 pages — ISBN 966-316-045-4
- T. Bykova, Seydamet Cafer // Political Encyclopaedia. / Editor: Yu. Levenets (head), Yu. Shapoval (deputy head) and others. — K.: Parliamentary publishing house, 2011 — 658 pages — ISBN 978-966-611-818-2
- Akhmatovich, A. Tragedy of the Crimean Tatars // Kasevet — 1991 — No. 1 (21) — pages 15–16
- Bekirova, G. A national democrat, a loyal son of the people // Crimea — 2009 — St. 9 — page 2
- Zarubin, A. G. Crimea: the beginning of the twentieth century - February 1917 // Historical Heritage of Crimea — Simferopol, 2005 — No. 11. — pages 120-164
- Zarubin V. G., Zarubina A. A. Cafer Seydamet: Strokes of a Portrait // Historical Heritage of Crimea — 2006 — No. 12-13 — pages 44–57
- Zarubin, A. G. The Second Regional Government: Towards "United and Indivisible" / V. G. Zarubin // Historical Heritage of Crimea — 2007 — No. 20 — pages 107-146
- Zarubin, A. G. The Crimean Tatar National Movement in 1917 and early 1918 / V. G. Zarubin // History and Archaeology of southwestern Crimea: Sat. scientific works — Simferopol, 1993 — pages 202-211
- Karahan, S. Pages from the History of the Dobrujans with the Crimean Right (Longing) // Bakhchisaray — 2009 — № 55-56 — pages 8–12
- Kerim, I. Two words about Cafer Seydamet and his story "Islam Aka" // Yildiz — 2005 — No. 4 — pages 5–11
- Little Crimea's Big Marriage // Emel — Istanbul, 1971 — № 63 — page 17; № 65 — pages 21–45
- Kurshutov, T. Literary Activity of Cafer Seydamet Qırımer // Yildiz — 2005 — No. 6 — pages 76–84
- Okay, A. C. Cafer Seydamet Qırımer and Idealism // Emel — 1967 — № 57 — pages 5–8
- Ozcan, Zonguldak In the Diary of O. Cafer Seydamet Qırımer // Our Emel is Crimea — 2006 — № 54 — pages 4–13
- Otar, I. In the Service of the People // Voice of Crimea — 31 March 1995 — page 3
- The Light that Illuminated our Lives / Prepared. I. Abdullaev // Voice of Crimea — 3 September 1999 — page 1
- Seydametova, V. They were martyred to protect the Crimean state // Crimea — 20 February 2008 — page 7
- Seitbekirov, E. "The Bolsheviks are a destructive force" // Voice of Crimea — 15 January 1994 — page 1
- Soysal, A. Z. Cafer Qırımer, in Commemoration // Emel — 1967 — № 57 — pages 24–26
- Tabakova, D. 120 Years Since the Birth of Crimean Tatar activist C. Seydamet // Avdet — 7 September 2009 — page 8
- Taran, P. Ye. Autonomist Ideas in the Political and Legal Thought of the Crimean Tatar people (1783-1918): diss... candidate. law Sciences: 12.00.01 / NAS of Ukraine; V. M. Koretskyi Institute of State and Law — K, 2004
- Uralgiray, Y. Izindeyiz! // Email — 1967 — № 57 — pages 18–23
- Ulkusal, M. Cafer Seydamet Qırımer: on the occasion of the 10th anniversary of his death / Mustecip Ulkusal // Emel — 1967 — № 57 — pages 1–4
- Ulkusal, M. Cafer Seyitahmet Qırımer and Kirim case // Emel — 1973 — № 75 — pages 1–12
- Is there a certain state leader of our people: J. On the occasion of Seydamet Krymer's 110th birthday // Crimea — 1999 — St. 11 — page 2
- Çelebicihan's Comrade: 110 years since the birth of Cafer Seydamet // Yildiz — 1999 — No. 5 — pages 144-145
- Shemi-zade, A. Cafer Seydamet Appreciated His Great Friend // Peninsula — 11–17 April 2008 — page 7
- Shemi-Zade, A. The Crimean Tatar Revolution of 1917 (Chronicle and Comments) // Avdet — 3 December 2007 — pages 8–9
- Shemi-Zade, A. The Resignation of Çelebicihan and the Crisis of the Crimean Tatar Revolution // Crimea — 12 December 2007 — pages 6–7
- Yurter, F. Letters of Mr. Cafer... // Yildiz — 1994 — No. 5 — pages 180-195
- Patriotic V. Eternal Leader of Crimean Turks // Emel — 1967 — № 57 — pages 14–17
