= 48th Assault Battalion (Ukraine) =

48th Separate Assault Battalion
- 48 Окремий штурмовий батальйон
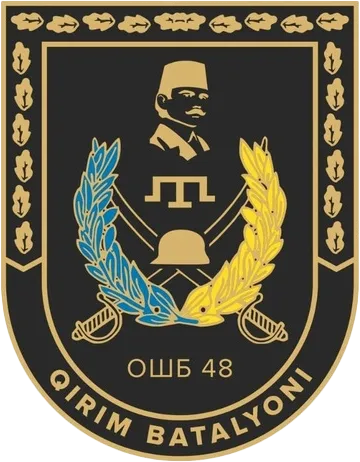
- Shoulder sleeve insignia
- Founded: September 18, 2016 – Today
- Country: Ukraine
- Branch: Ukrainian Ground Forces
- Patron: Noman Çelebicihan
- Motto: Our mission is to bring home back!
- Engagements: Russo-Ukrainian War
- Website: https://48bat.army/

Commanders
- Current commander: Maj. Vladyslav Tyupa

Insignia
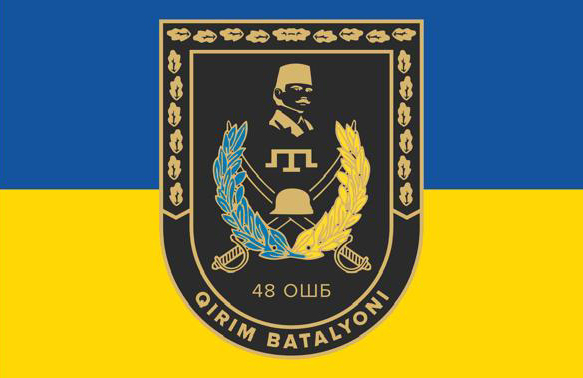
- Flag

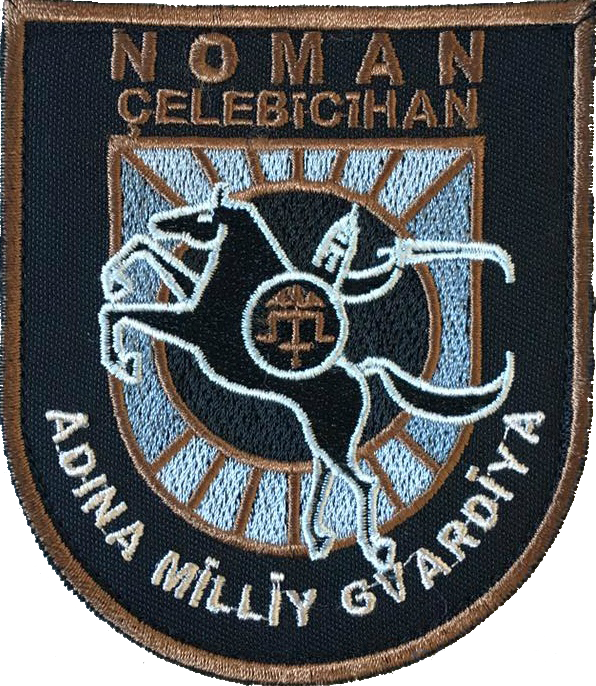
- Former insignia

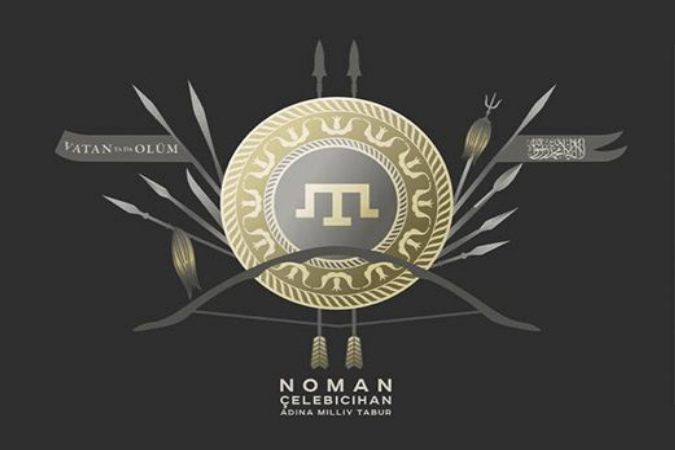
- Former flag

48th Separate Assault Battalion named after "Noman Chelebijihan", also known as the Noman Çelebicihan Battalion, is a battalion of the Ukrainian Ground Forces.

== History ==
The 48th Assault Battalion, formally part of the 123rd Territorial Defense Brigade, has a storied history rooted in resistance against Russian aggression. Initially formed in 2016 by Crimean Tatar volunteers opposing Russia's annexation of Crimea, the unit was short-lived and disbanded later that same year. However, many of its former soldiers returned to military service following Russia’s full-scale invasion of Ukraine in February 2022. The battalion was reconstituted from elements of the 251st Territorial Defense Battalion and named after Noman Çelebicihan, a revered Crimean Tatar political figure.

While many of the battalion’s officers and enlisted personnel are Crimean Tatars, it is not an ethnically homogeneous unit; any Ukrainian citizen can join. Most recruits hail from southern Ukraine and Russian-occupied Crimea, with roots tracing back to participants in the 2015 activist-led blockade of Crimea, which halted Ukrainian cargo shipments to the peninsula. When reformed, the battalion aimed for a strength of approximately 560 members.

In its early days in 2016, the battalion reportedly received support from Turkish volunteers shortly after its founding. During this period, it assisted the State Border Guard Service of Ukraine along the border with Crimea. By the end of 2016, however, the battalion had largely dissolved, with many of its volunteers joining other units or enlisting in the Ukrainian Armed Forces.

The battalion was re-established on February 24, 2022, in response to Russia's renewed invasion of Ukraine, as reported by the Crimean News Agency (Qırım Haber Ajansı). In June 2022, the Supreme Court of Russia controversially designated the Noman Çelebicihan Battalion as a terrorist organization—an accusation widely seen as politically motivated.

At the start of December, it successfully expelled Russian forces from the village of Novyi Komar, thwarting their attempts to encircle the nearby town of Velyka Novosilka. Earlier in the year, on January 8, the battalion had been deployed to Pokrovsk. Within weeks, tensions arose when servicemen released an open appeal to Oleksandr Syrskyi, Commander-in-Chief of Ukraine’s Armed Forces. They expressed concerns over the sudden replacement of their commander and the lack of adequate intelligence following their redeployment.

== Structure ==
As of 2025 the regiments's structure is as follows:

48th Separate Assault Battalion:

- Regiment's Headquarters
- 1st Assault Company
- 2nd Assault Company
- 3rd Assault Company
- Shkval Company (Penal company consisting of convicts mobilized for military service)
