= Amet Özenbaşlı =

Crimean Tatar politician and writer

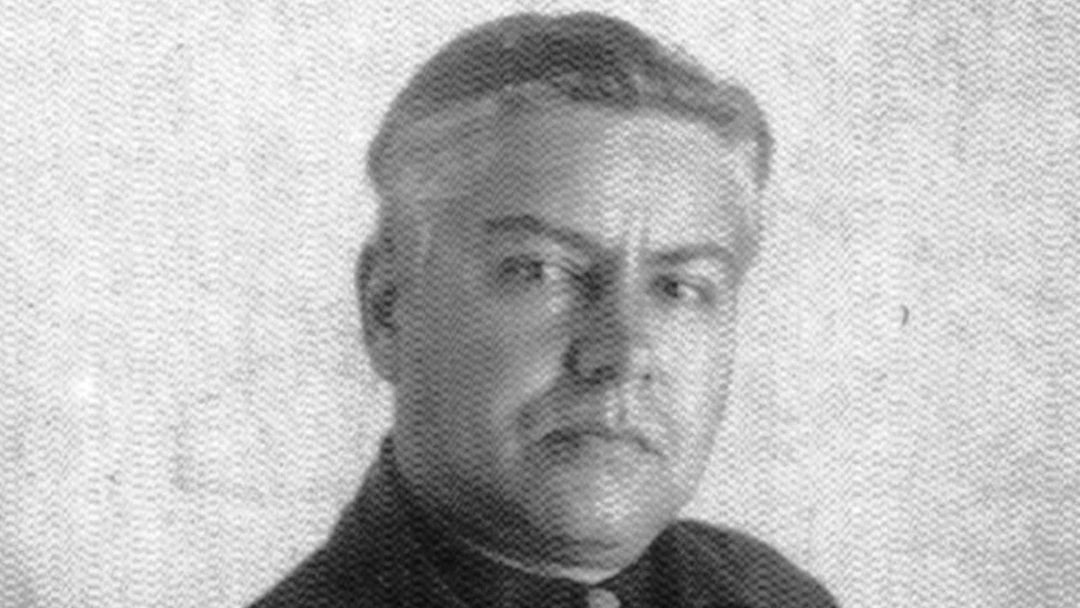
- Born: 10 February 1893; Bakhchysarai, Russian Empire (now Crimea)
- Died: 4 December 1958 (aged 65); Leninabad, Tajik SSR, Soviet Union (now Khujand, Tajikistan)

Amet Seid Abdulla oğlu Özenbaşlı (10 February 1893 – 4 December 1958) was a Crimean Tatar politician and writer. A leading member of the Crimean Tatar nationalist movement and a minister in the Crimean People's Republic, he was later involved in the Crimean Tatar community in the Soviet Union. After supporting Crimean Tatar collaboration with Nazi Germany during World War II, he was sentenced to 25 years in prison, but was released in 1955. Following his prison service, he lived in Tajikistan until his death.

== Biography ==
Amet Özenbaşlı was born on 10 February 1893 in Bakhchysarai. His father was Seid Abdulla Özenbaşlı, a prominent Crimean Tatar writer and musician. In 1914, he graduated from the M. A. Voloshenko men's gymnasium in Simferopol. For some time, he worked in the publishing house of Ismail Gasprinsky, working in Arabic calligraphy and graphic design. From 1915 to 1917, he studied at the medical faculty of the Imperial University of Novorossiya in Odessa.

In 1917, amidst the Russian Revolution, Özenbaşlı was a member of the Executive Committee of the Provisional Muslim Revolutionary Committee, the Council of People's Representatives, and a delegate to the Qurultay of the Crimean Tatar People. Though a socialist, he was also a Crimean Tatar nationalist, and was the delegate of Crimean Tatars to the Congress of the Enslaved Peoples of Russia. He was a leading member of the Milliy Firqa, and, during the Crimean People's Republic, served as minister of education.

In 1918, Özenbaşlı participated in the Crimean Regional Government, and, alongside Maciej Sulkiewicz, was a participant in negotiations with the Ukrainian State in Kyiv. During the Russian Civil War, he was targeted by the White movement and, after the Red Army occupied Crimea, he joined Bolshevik authorities. In 1920, he founded the Şirket agricultural cooperative, which had branches throughout Crimea and included several former members of the Milliy Firqa.

From 1922 to 1924, Özenbaşlı served as a psychology teacher, and head of the psychology department at the Crimean Tatar Pedagogical Institute. In 1922, he graduated from the medical faculty of the Tavrida National V.I. Vernadsky University, receiving a diploma in neuropathology. He was a leading member of the Koç Yardim (lit. 'Help for Settlers') programme, which aimed to facilitate the return of Crimean Tatars from Turkey and Bulgaria.

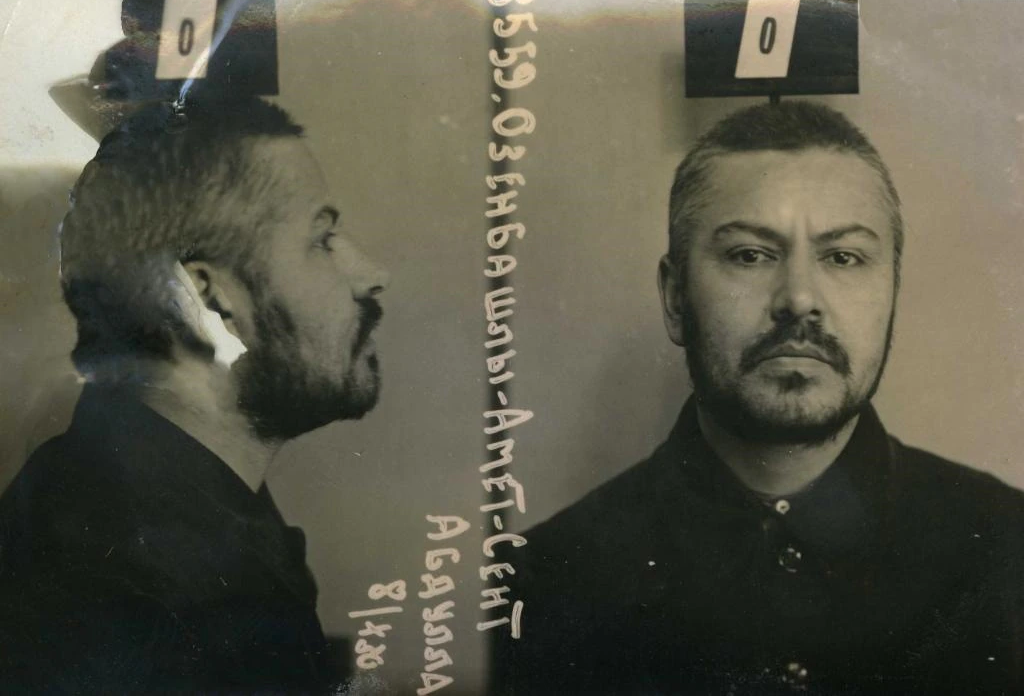
Özenbaşlı's mugshot following his arrest by Soviet authorities

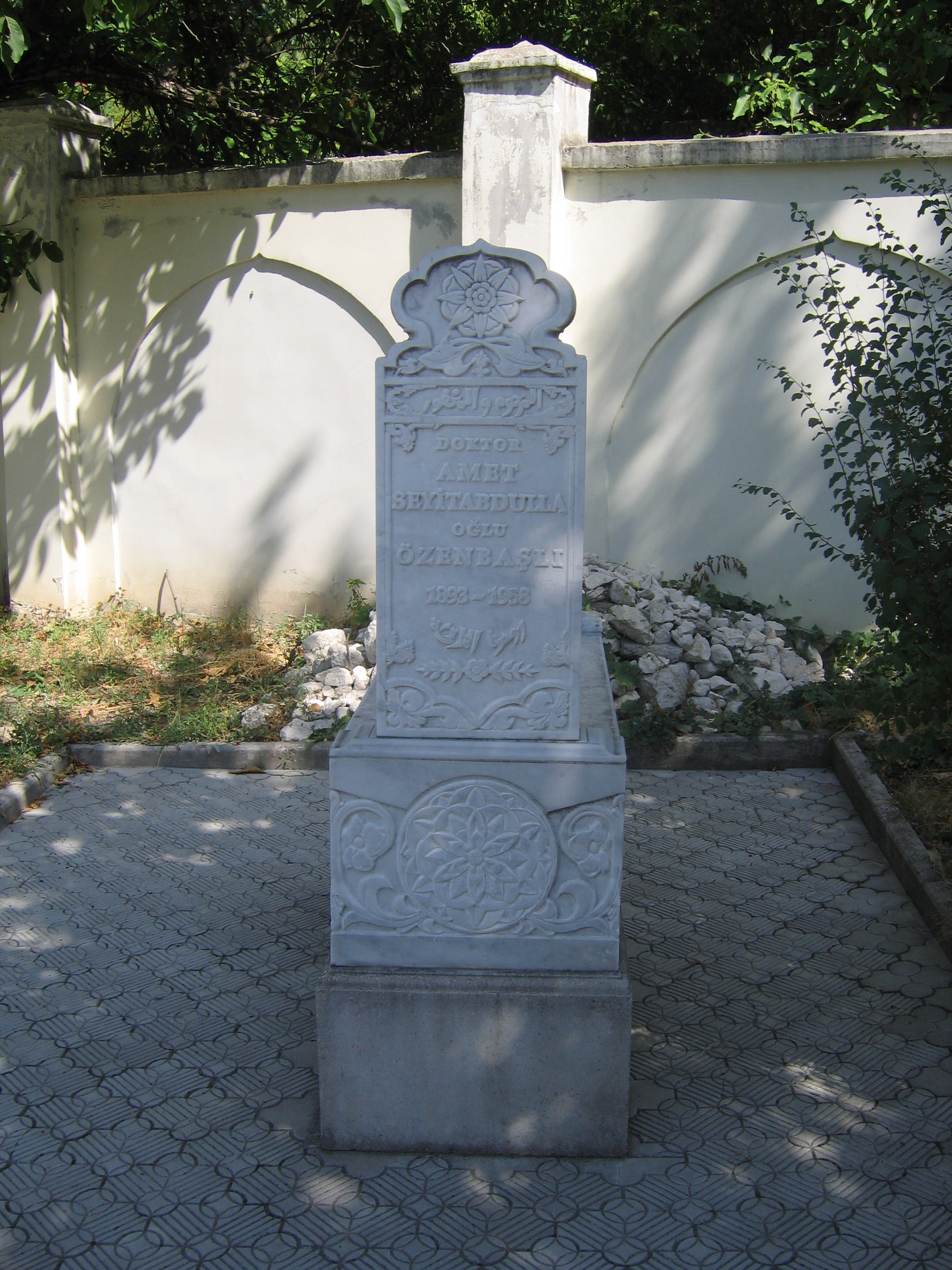
Özenbaşlı's tomb in Bakhchysarai

From 1924 to 1927, he served as Deputy People's Commissar of Finance of the Crimean Autonomous Soviet Socialist Republic. Afterwards, he worked as a neuropathologist at the third polyclinic of Simferopol. However, this work would not last long; in April 1928, he was arrested in connection with his work as a member of the Milliy Firqa, and sentenced to death in December 1928. This sentence, however, was soon overturned by ten years of hard labour in the Transbaikal region. From 1931 to 1934, he worked in the construction of the White Sea–Baltic Canal as a doctor for prisoners. In 1934, he was released, and subsequently worked in Novosibirsk and Pavlohrad as a doctor.

Amidst World War II, Özenbaşlı returned to Crimea. He collaborated with Nazi forces, and called on Crimean Tatars to join the Nazis to expel the Soviets and create an independent Crimea under German tutelage. As the Germans retreated, he fled to Romania, where he was captured and sent back to Moscow. In 1947, he was sentenced to 25 years' imprisonment. In 1955, however, he was released early, and moved to Leninabad, in the Tajik Soviet Socialist Republic (now Khujand in independent Tajikistan). He lived in Leninabad until his death on 4 December 1958.

On 8 August 1993, his ashes were reburied in the Zincirli Madrasa in Bakhchysarai, next to Ismail Gasprinsky, according to his will.
