= Ant etkenmen =

Crimean Tatar folk song

English: 'I've Promised'
- Former national anthem of the Crimean People's Republic
- Lyrics: Noman Çelebicihan, 1917
- Adopted: 1917 (by the CPR); 1991
- Relinquished: 1918 (by the CPR)

"Ant etkenmen" (pronounced [ˌɑnt‿ɛtkɛnˈmɛn]; lit. 'I've Promised') is the ethnic anthem of the Crimean Tatars. The lyrics were written in 1917 by Crimean Tatar politician and writer Noman Çelebicihan, who served as President of the short-lived Crimean People's Republic from 1917 to 1918.

== Lyrics ==
Latin script (1992–present)	Cyrillic script (since 1938)	IPA transcription (Note: See Help:IPA/Crimean Tatar and Crimean Tatar phonology.) (Bağçasaray standard)
𝄆 Ant etkenmen, milletimniñ yarasını sarmağa 𝄇 𝄆 Nasıl olsun bu zavallı qardaşlarım çürüsin? 𝄇 𝄆 Onlar içün ökünmesem, qayğırmasam, yaşasam 𝄇 𝄆 Yüregimde qara qanlar qaynamasın, qurusın. 𝄇 𝄆 Ant etkenmen, şu qaranğı yurtqa şavle sepmege 𝄇 𝄆 Nasıl olsun eki qardaş bir-birini körmesin? 𝄇 𝄆 Bunı körip buvsanmasam, muğaymasam, yanmasam 𝄇 𝄆 Közlerimden aqqan yaşlar derya-deñiz qan olsun. 𝄇 𝄆 Ant etkenmen, söz bergenmen millet içün ölmege 𝄇 𝄆 Bilip, körip milletimniñ köz yaşını silmege. 𝄇 𝄆 Bilmey, körmey biñ yaşasam, Qurultaylı han olsam 𝄇 𝄆 Kene bir kün mezarcılar kelir meni kömmege. 𝄇	𝄆 Ант эткенмен, миллетимнинъ ярасыны сармагъа 𝄇 𝄆 Насыл олсун бу заваллы къардашларым чюрюсин? 𝄇 𝄆 Онлар ичюн окюнмесем, къайгъырмасам, яшасам 𝄇 𝄆 Юрегимде къара къанлар къайнамасын, къурусын. 𝄇 𝄆 Ант эткенмен, шу къарангъы юрткъа шавле сепмеге 𝄇 𝄆 Насыл олсун эки къардаш бир-бирини кёрмесин? 𝄇 𝄆 Буны кёрип бувсанмасам, мугъаймасам, янмасам 𝄇 𝄆 Кёзлеримден акъкъан яшлар дерья-денъиз къан олсун. 𝄇 𝄆 Ант эткенмен, сёз бергенмен миллет ичюн олмеге 𝄇 𝄆 Билип, кёрип миллетимнинъ кёз яшыны силмеге. 𝄇 𝄆 Билмей, кёрмей бинъ яшасам, Къурултайлы хан олсам 𝄇 𝄆 Кене бир кюн мезарджылар келир мени кёммеге. 𝄇	𝄆 [ˌɑnt‿ɛt.kɛnˈmɛn mɪlˌlɛ.tɪmˈnɪŋ jɑˌɾɑ.sɯˈnɯ sɑɾ.mɑˈʁɑ |] 𝄇 𝄆 [nɑˈsɯɫ ɔɫˈsʊn bʊ zɑ.ʋɑɫˈɫɯ qɑɾˌdɑʃ.ɫɑˈɾɯm tʃʏ.ɾʏˈsɪn ‖] 𝄇 𝄆 [ɔnˈɫɑɾ ɪˈtʃʏn œˌkʏn.mɛˈsɛm qɑjˌʁɯɾ.mɑˈsɑm jɑ.ʃɑˈsɑm |] 𝄇 𝄆 [jʏˌɾɛ.ɣɪmˈdɛ qɑˈɾɑ qɑnˈɫɑɾ qɑjˌnɑ.mɑˈsɯn qʊ.ɾʊˈsɯn ‖] 𝄇 𝄆 [ˌɑnt‿ɛt.kɛnˈmɛn ʃʊ qɑ.ɾɑɴˈʁɯ jʊɾtˈqɑ ʃɑʋˈlɛ sɛp.mɛˈɣɛ |] 𝄇 𝄆 [nɑˈsɯɫ ɔɫˈsʊn ɛˈkɪ qɑɾˈdɑʃ ˌbɪɾ‿bɪ.ɾɪˈnɪ kœɾ.mɛˈsɪn ‖] 𝄇 𝄆 [bʊˈnɯ kœˈɾɪp bʊʋˌsɑn.mɑˈsɑm mʊˌʁɑj.mɑˈsɑm jɑn.mɑˈsɑm |] 𝄇 𝄆 [kœzˌlɛ.ɾɪmˈdɛn ɑqˈqɑn jɑʃˈɫɑɾ dɛɾˌjɑ‿dɛŋˈɪz qɑn ɔɫˈsʊn ‖] 𝄇 𝄆 [ˌɑnt‿ɛt.kɛnˈmɛn sœz bɛɾ.gɛnˈmɛn mɪlˈlɛt ɪˈtʃʏn œl.mɛˈɣɛ |] 𝄇 𝄆 [bɪˈlɪp kœˈɾɪp mɪlˌlɛ.tɪmˈnɪŋ kɶz jɑ.ʃɯˈnɯ sɪl.mɛˈɣɛ ‖] 𝄇 𝄆 [bɪlˈmɛj kœɾˈmɛj bɪŋ jɑ.ʃɑˈsɑm qʊˌɾʊɫ.tɑjˈɫɯ χɑn ɔɫˈsɑm |] 𝄇 𝄆 [kɛˈnɛ bɪɾ kʏn mɛˌzɑɾ.dʒɯˈɫɑɾ kɛˈlɪɾ mɛˈnɪ kœm.mɛˈɣɛ ‖] 𝄇
Arabic script (original orthography)	Yañalif (1928–38)	English translation
𝄆 ،آند اتكەنمەن، ملتمنڭ ياراسنی صارماغا 𝄇 𝄆 ناصل اولسون بو زاواللی قارداشلارم چوروسون؟ 𝄇 𝄆 ،اونلار ایچون اوكونمەسەم، قايغورماسام، ياشاسام 𝄇 𝄆 .يورەگیمدە قارا قانلار قايناماسين، قوروسون 𝄇 𝄆 ،آند اتكەنمەن، شو قارانغی يورتقا شاوله سەپمەگە 𝄇 𝄆 ناصل اولسون ايكی قارداش بیر-بیرینی كورمەسين؟ 𝄇 𝄆 ،بونی كوروب بوصانماسام، مغايماسام، جانماسام 𝄇 𝄆 .كوزلەريمدەن آقان ياشلار دريا-دەڭیز قان اولسون 𝄇 𝄆 ،آند اتكەنمەن، سوز بەرگەمەن ملت ایچون اولمگه 𝄇 𝄆 .بیلوب، كوروب ملتمنڭ كوز ياشنى سيلمەكە 𝄇 𝄆 ،بيلمى، كورمى بيڭ ياشاسام، قورولتايلى خان اولسام 𝄇 𝄆 .كنە بیر كون مزارجيلار كلیر منى كومەگە 𝄇	𝄆 Ant etkenmen, milletimiᶇ jarasьnь sarmaƣa 𝄇 𝄆 Nasьl olsun ʙu zavallь qardaşlarьm cyrysin? 𝄇 𝄆 Onlar icyn ɵkynmesem, qajƣьrmasam, jaşasam 𝄇 𝄆 Jyregimde qara qanlar qajnamasьn, qurusьn. 𝄇 𝄆 Ant etkenmen, şu qaranƣь jurtqa şavle sepmege 𝄇 𝄆 Nasьl olsun eki qardaş ʙir-ʙirini kɵrmesin? 𝄇 𝄆 Bunь kɵrip ʙuvsanmasam, muƣajmasam, janmasam 𝄇 𝄆 Kɵzlerimden aqqan jaşlar derja-deᶇiz qan olsun. 𝄇 𝄆 Ant etkenmen, sɵz ʙergenmen millet icyn ɵlmege 𝄇 𝄆 Bilip, kɵrip milletimiᶇ kɵz jaşьnь silmege. 𝄇 𝄆 Bilmej, kɵrmej biᶇ jaşasam, Qurultajlь xan olsam 𝄇 𝄆 Kene ʙir kyn mezarçьlar kelir meni kɵmmege. 𝄇	𝄆 I've promised to heal the wounds of my nation, 𝄇 𝄆 How come my unfortunate brothers rot away? 𝄇 𝄆 If I don't regret for them, grieve for them, so then I'll live 𝄇 𝄆 Let the dark streams of blood in my heart go dry. 𝄇 𝄆 I've promised to spread light to that darkened country 𝄇 𝄆 How come two brothers do not see one another? 𝄇 𝄆 When I see this, if I don't get distressed, hurt or seared 𝄇 𝄆 Let the tears that flow from my eyes become a sea of blood. 𝄇 𝄆 I've promised to pledge to die for the nation, 𝄇 𝄆 Knowing and seeing it, to wipe away the teardrops of my nation. 𝄇 𝄆 Without seeing and knowing it, even if I live a thousand years and am a crowned king, 𝄇 𝄆 One day the gravediggers will still come to bury me. 𝄇

== Original poem ==
Latin script (1992–present)	Cyrillic script (since 1938)	IPA transcription
Ant etkenmen, tatarlarnıñ yarasını sarmağa, Nasıl bolsun bu zavallı qardaşlarım çürüsin? Onlar içün ökünmesem, qayğurmasam, yaşasam, Yüregimde qara qanlar qaynamasın, qurusın! Ant etkenmen, şu qaranğı yurtqa şavle serpmege, Nasıl bolsun iki qardaş bir-birini körmesin? Bunı körip buvsanmasam, muğaymasam, yanmasam, Közlerimden aqqan yaşlar derya-deñiz qan bolsun! Ant etkenmen, söz bergenmen bilmek içün ölmege, Bilip, körip milletimniñ közyaşını silmege. Bilmiy, körmiy biñ yaşasam, Qurultaylı han bolsam, Yine bir kün mezarcılar kelir meni kömmege.	Ант эткенмен, татарларнынъ ярасыны сармагъа, Насыл болсун бу заваллы къардашларым чюрюсин? Онлар ичюн окюнмесем, къайгъурмасам, яшасам, Юрегимде къара къанлар къайнамасын, къурусын! Ант эткенмен, шу къарангъы юрткъа шавле серпмеге, Насыл болсун ики къардаш бир-бирини кёрмесин? Буны кёрип бувсанмасам, мугъаймасам, янмасам, Кёзлеримден акъкъан яшлар дерья-денъиз къан болсун! Ант эткенмен, сёз бергенмен билмек ичюн олмеге, Билип, кёрип миллетимнинъ кёзьяшыны силмеге. Билмий, кёрмий бинъ яшасам, Къурултайлы хан болсам, Йине бир кюн мезарджылар келир мени кёммеге.	𝄆 [ˌɑ̝̃n̪t̪‿e̞t̪.kẽ̞n̪ˈmẽ̞n̪ t̪ɑ̝ˌt̪ɑ̝ɾ.ɫ̪ɑ̝ɾˈn̪ɯ̞̃ɴ jɑ̝ˌɾɑ̝.s̪ɯ̞̃ˈn̪ɯ̞ s̪ɑ̝ɾ.mɑ̝ˈʁɑ̝ |] 𝄇 𝄆 [n̪ɑ̝ˈs̪ɯ̞ɫ̪ bo̞ɫ̪ˈs̪ũ̞n̪ bu̞ z̪ɑ̝.ʋɑ̝ɫ̪ˈɫ̪ɯ̞ qɑ̝ɾˌd̪ɑ̝ʃ.ɫ̪ɑ̝ˈɾɯ̞̃m tʃy̞.ɾy̞ˈs̪ĩ̞n̪ ‖] 𝄇 𝄆 [õ̞n̪ˈɫ̪ɑ̝ɾ i̞ˈtʃỹ̞n̪ ø̞ˌkỹ̞n̪.me̞ˈs̪ẽ̞m qɑ̝jˌʁɯ̞ɾ.mɑ̝ˈsɑ̝̃m jɑ̝.ʃɑ̝ˈs̪ɑ̝̃m |] 𝄇 𝄆 [jy̞ˌɾe̞.ɣĩ̞mˈd̪e̞ qɑ̝ˈɾɑ̝ qɑ̝̃n̪ˈɫ̪ɑ̝ɾ qɑ̝jˌn̪ɑ̝̃.mɑ̝ˈs̪ɯ̞̃n̪ qu̞.ɾu̞ˈs̪ɯ̞̃n̪ ‖] 𝄇 𝄆 [ˌɑ̝̃n̪t̪‿e̞t̪.kẽ̞n̪ˈmẽ̞n̪ ʃu̞ qɑ̝.ɾɑ̝̃ɴˈʁɯ̞ ju̞ɾt̪ˈqɑ̝ ʃɑ̝ʋˈl̪e̞ s̪e̞ɾp.me̞ˈɣe̞ |] 𝄇 𝄆 [nɑ̝ˈs̪ɯ̞ɫ̪ bo̞ɫ̪ˈs̪ũ̞n̪ i̞ˈki̞ qɑ̝ɾˈd̪ɑ̝ʃ ˌbi̞ɾ‿bi̞.ɾĩ̞ˈn̪i̞ kø̞ɾ.me̞ˈs̪ĩ̞n̪ ‖] 𝄇 𝄆 [bũ̞ˈn̪ɯ̞ kø̞ˈɾi̞p bu̞ʋˌs̪ɑ̝̃n̪.mɑ̝ˈs̪ɑ̝̃m mu̞ˌʁɑ̝j.mɑ̝ˈs̪ɑ̝̃m jɑ̝̃n̪.mɑ̝ˈs̪ɑ̝̃m |] 𝄇 𝄆 [kø̞z̪ˌl̪e̞.ɾĩ̞mˈd̪ẽ̞n̪ ɑ̝qˈqɑ̝̃n̪ jɑ̝ʃˈɫ̪ɑ̝ɾ d̪e̞ɾˌjɑ̝‿d̪ẽ̞ŋˈi̞z̪ qɑ̝̃n̪ o̞ɫ̪ˈs̪ũ̞n̪ ‖] 𝄇 𝄆 [ˌɑ̝̃n̪t̪‿e̞t̪.kẽ̞n̪ˈmẽ̞n̪ s̪ø̞z̪ be̞ɾ.gẽ̞n̪ˈmẽ̞n̪ bi̞l̪ˈme̞k i̞ˈtʃy̞n̪ ø̞l̪.me̞ˈɣe̞ |] 𝄇 𝄆 [bi̞ˈli̞p kø̞ˈɾi̞p mi̞l̪ˌl̪e̞.t̪ĩ̞mˈn̪ĩ̞ŋ kø̞z̪ˌjɑ̝.ʃɯ̞ˈn̪ɯ̞ s̪i̞l̪.me̞ˈɣe̞ ‖] 𝄇 𝄆 [bi̞l̪ˈmi̞j kø̞ɾˈmi̞j bĩ̞ŋ jɑ̝.ʃɑ̝ˈs̪ɑ̝m qu̞ˌɾu̞ɫ.t̪ɑ̝jˈɫ̪ɯ̞ χɑ̝n̪ bo̞ɫ̪ˈsɑ̝̃m |] 𝄇 𝄆 [ji̞ˈn̪e̞ bi̞ɾ ky̞n̪ me̞ˌz̪ɑ̝ɾ.dʒɯ̞ˈɫ̪ɑ̝ɾ ke̞ˈl̪i̞ɾ mẽ̞ˈn̪i̞ kø̞̃m.me̞ˈɣe̞ ‖] 𝄇
Arabic script (original orthography)	Yañalif (1928–38)	English translation
،آند اتكەنمەن، تاتارلارنڭ ياراسنى صارماغا ناصل بولسون بو زواللى قارداشلارم چوروسون؛.اونلار ايچون اوكونمەسەم، قايغوماسام، ياشاسام !يورەكيمدە قارا قانلار قايناماسين، قوروسون ،آند اتكەنمەن، شو قارانغى يورتقا شاولە سەرپمەگە ناصل بولسون ايكى قارداش بير-بيرينى كورمەسين؟ ،بونى كوروب بوصانماسام، مغايماسام، جانماسام !كوزلەريمدەن آقان ياشلار دريا-دەڭيز قان بولسون ،آند اتكەنمەن، سوز بەرگەمەن بيلمەك ايچون اولمەگە.بيلوب، كوروب ملتمنڭ كوزياشنى سيلمەگە ،بيلمى، كورمى بيڭ ياشاسام، قورولتايلى خان بولسام !يينە بير كون مزارجيلار كلير بنى كومەگە	Ant etkenmen, tatarlarnьᶇ jarasьnь sarmaƣa, Nasьl ʙolsun ʙu zavallь qardaşlarьm cyrysin? Onlar icyn ɵkynmesem, qajƣurmasam, jaşasam, Jyregimde qara qanlar qajnamasьn, qurusьn! Ant etkenmen, şu qaranƣь jurtqa şavle serpmege, Nasьl ʙolsun iki qardaş ʙir-ʙirini kɵrmesin? Bunь kɵrip ʙuvsanmasam, muƣajmasam, janmasam, Kɵzlerimden aqqan jaşlar derya-deᶇiz qan ʙolsun! Ant etkenmen, sɵz ʙergenmen ʙilmek icyn ɵlmege, Bilip, kɵrip milletimniᶇ kɵzjaşьnь silmege. Bilmij, kɵrmij ʙiᶇ jaşasam, Qurultajlь han ʙolsam, Jine ʙir kyn mezarçьlar kelir meni kɵmmege.	I've promised to heal the wounds of my Tatar nation, How come my unfortunate brothers rot away? If I don't regret for them, grieve for them; live for them. Let the dark streams of blood in my heart go dry. I've promised to spread light to that darkened country How come two brothers do not see one another? When I see this, if I don't get distressed, hurt, seared Let the tears that flow from my eyes become a sea of blood. I've promised to pledge to die for the nation, Knowing and seeing it, to wipe away the teardrops of my nation. Without seeing and knowing, even if I live a thousand years and am a crowned king, One day the gravediggers will still come to bury me.

== See also ==
- "Ey Güzel Kırım" – a popular Crimean folk song
- Hymn of Crimea – the former regional anthem of Crimea
