= Olga Kovitidi =

Russian politician (born 1962)

- Ольга Ковитиди
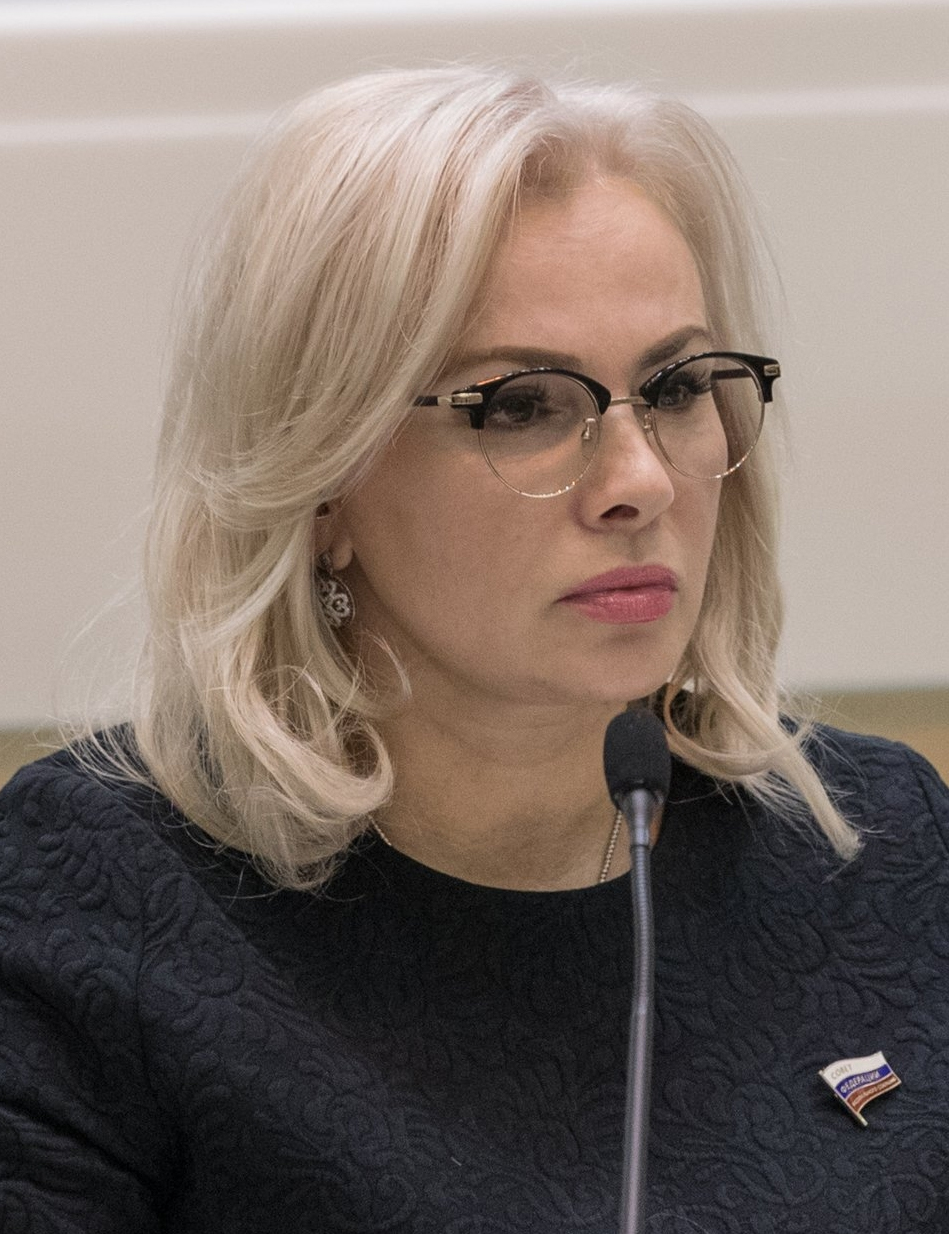

Russian Federation Senator from Crimea
- In office 15 April 2014 – 12 September 2024 Serving with Sergei Tsekov
- Preceded by: Seat established
- Succeeded by: Yury Nimchenko

Deputy Chairman of the Council of Ministers of Crimea^{α}
- In office 27 February 2014 – 26 March 2014

Member of the Crimean Supreme Council
- In office 26 March 2006 – 17 March 2014

Personal details
- Born: Olha Fedorivna Kovditidi; 7 May 1962 (age 64) Simferopol, Ukrainian SSR, Soviet Union (now disputed)
- Party: United Russia (since 2014); Party of Regions (2010 to 2014)

Olga Fyodorovna Kovitidi (Ukrainian: Ольга Федорівна Ковітіді; Russian: Ольга Фёдоровна Ковитиди; born on 7 May 1962), is a Russian and former Ukrainian politician, who currently serves as Russian Federation Senator from Crimea since 2014. Kovitidi was previously a member of the Verkhovna Rada of Crimea from 2006 until 2014, when it was dissolved amidst the generally internationally unrecognised Russian annexation of Crimea, which she supported. During her tenure in the Rada, she briefly served as her peninsula's Deputy Prime Minister in 2014.

A longtime pro-Russian politician, she has generated controversy for expressing anti-Ukrainian sentiment on TV.

== Biography ==
Kovitidi was born on 7 May 1962 in Simferopol. She was educated as Candidate in Law.

Kovitidi taught law as an assistant professor. She went on to become Chair of the Union of Lawyers of the Crimea and Deputy Chair of the Union of Lawyers of Ukraine. She was a member of the World Association of Lawyers, the World Congress of Lawyers of Ukrainian origin and the Council of the World Greek Interparliamentary Union.

In 2010, she joined the then-ruling party of Ukraine, the Party of Regions, which was the main pro-Russian party in the country.

From 2013 to 2014, she was an assistant to the Minister of Justice of Ukraine.

In early 2014, she became the Deputy Prime Minister of the Autonomous Republic of Crimea. Along with most other members of the state legislature, she refused to recognise the new government that came to power after the 2014 Ukrainian Revolution, and instead backed Crimea's incorporation into Russia. The move was condemned by the United Nations and she was placed on the sanctions list of the United Kingdom and the European Union, as well as the wanted list of Ukraine for what it considered to be high treason.

On 26 March 2014, the State Council of the Republic of Crimea nominated Kovitidi to represent Crimea at the Federation Council. She was confirmed on 15 April 2014.

As a Senator, she serves on the Committee on Defense and Security.

In February 2015, at the winter session held on February 18–20 in Vienna, the OSCE Parliamentary Assembly refused to recognise the credentials of Kovitidi as a member of the Russian delegation. She was initially included in its composition as “the first member of the Federation Council of the Federal Assembly of the Russian Federation from the executive power of the Republic of Crimea”. The decision to not recognise her was made on 18 February at a meeting of the Credentials Committee, because "a parliamentarian nominated to work in the PA must represent the country that makes the presentation - and not the authority that was established on foreign soil by methods that most OSCE countries recognise as illegal."

In 2021, she was accused of Ukrainophobia after stating: "I remembered what Alexander Zakharchenko said now. When we discussed everything that is happening now in Donbas, he said: "You know, we have never seen such atrocities. They are inhumans." And he gave an example of the fact that there are many such cases, which are just scary to talk about today. An eight-year-old girl was raped and foam concrete was poured into her vagina. There were cases when four girls, literally from 18 to 25 years old, had "Separatist's godfather", "Separatist's wife", "Separatist's daughter" cut out on their foreheads. With their breasts cut, they were put back to back, tied with wire and sent to their relatives." Her statement was aired live on the Russian program "Time will tell" on Channel One.

== Notes ==
^α The political entity being the Autonomous Republic of Crimea until 17 March 2014, after which it became the Republic of Crimea.
