= Alemdar Karamanov =

Ukrainian composer and pianist (1934-2007)

Alemdar Karamanov Алемдар Караманов Shevchenko National Prize laureate

Background information
- Born: September 10, 1934; Simferopol, Crimean ASSR, Russian SFSR, Soviet Union
- Died: May 3, 2007 (aged 72) Simferopol, Ukraine
- Genres: Classical
- Occupation: Composer

Alemdar Sabitovich Karamanov (Note: Russian: Алемдар Сабитович Караманов, romanized: Alemdar Sabitovich Karamanov; Ukrainian: Алемдар Сабітович Караманов, romanized: Alemdar Sabitovych Karamanov; Turkish: Alemdar Sabit oğlu Karamanov) (10 September 1934 – 3 May 2007) was a composer.

== Biography ==
Karamanov was born on September 10, 1934, in Simferopol, Ukrainian SSR, Soviet Union. His father, Sabit Temel Kağırman, of Turkish origin, left Turkey and emigrated to Crimea. His mother, Paulina Sergeyevna, was a Russian singer and librarian and taught him music. Karamanov would begin writing music when he was six years old, and would enroll into the musical elementary school and eventually the college at Simferopol.

After World War II his father, due to his non-Russian background, was exiled to Kemerovo and never returned. In 1958 Karamanov graduated from the Moscow Conservatory, where he studied with Semyon Bogatyrev (composition), Vladimir A. Natanson (piano). In graduate school (1958–1963), he was listed with D. B. Kabalevsky, but actually studied with Tikhon Khrennikov, who appreciated Karamanov's talent highly. He continued his graduate studies with Tikhon Khrennikov and Dmitry Kabalevsky.

Karamanov is above all a composer of symphonies. During his student days, he wrote 10 symphonies, followed by 14 or 15 more. However, he did not find success in Russia for many years: his compositions were rarely performed or mentioned in the media due to their unpopular unconventional style.

In 1992, he composed the anthem of the Autonomous Republic of Crimea.

Karamanov died on 3 May 2007, in Simferopol.

== Honours ==
The minor planet 4274 Karamanov, discovered in 1980 by Nikolai Chernykh, is named in his honour.
