= Yury Nimchenko =

Russian military officer and politician

- Юрий Нимченко
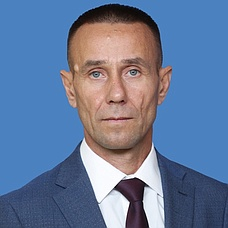

Russian Federation Senator from the Republic of Crimea
- Incumbent
- Assumed office 12 September 2024
- Preceded by: Olga Kovitidi

Personal details
- Born: Yury Petrovich Nimchenko; 4 June 1980 (age 45) Bukvarka, Kirovohrad Oblast, Ukrainian SSR, USSR
- Occupation: Military officer
- Awards: Hero of the Russian Federation; Order of Courage; Medal of the Order "For Merit to the Fatherland"

Military service
- Allegiance: Ukraine (2005–2014); Russia (2014–2024)
- Branch/service: Ukrainian Ground Forces (2005–14); Russian Naval Infantry (2014–2024)
- Years of service: 2005–2024
- Rank: Senior sergeant
- Battles/wars: Russian invasion of Ukraine

Yury Petrovich Nimchenko (Russian: Юрий Петрович Нимченко, Ukrainian: Юрій Петрович Німченко, romanized: Yurii Petrovych Nimchenko; born 4 June 1980) is a Ukrainian-born Russian military officer and politician serving as the senator from Crimea since 12 September 2024. A veteran of the Russian invasion of Ukraine, he was awarded the Hero of the Russian Federation title in 2022.

== Early life and military career ==
Nimchenko was born on 4 June 1980 in Bukvarka, Kirovohrad Oblast, Ukrainian SSR, USSR.

He completed his mandatory military service in the Armed Forces of Ukraine as a tank driver mechanic. After finishing his mandatory military service in 2005, he switched to contract service and was deployed to Crimea.

Following the Russian annexation of Crimea in 2014, Nimchenko defected and joined the Russian Armed Forces. He fought in the Russian invasion of Ukraine as a tank driver and was awarded the Hero of the Russian Federation title in 2022 by President Vladimir Putin. In addition, he was awarded the Order of Courage and the Medal of the Order "For Merit to the Fatherland".

== Political career ==
In the 2024 Russian presidential election, Nimchenko endorsed Vladimir Putin and participated in his campaign. On 12 September 2024, the head of the Republic of Crimea Sergey Aksyonov appointed Nimchenko the senator from Crimea. On 25 September, he was included in the Federation Council Committee on Defense and Security.
