= Crimean People's Republic =

1917–1918 self-declared state in Crimea

Coordinates: 44.7528°N 33.8608°E

Crimean People's Republic Qırım Halq Cumhuriyeti (Crimean Tatar) قريم خلق جمهوريتى Кримська Народна Республіка (Ukrainian) Krymska Narodna Respublika Крымская Народная Республика (Russian) Krymskaya Narodnaya Respublika
- 1917–1918
- The official flag adopted by the Republic in 1917 Emblem
- Anthem: "Ant etkenmen" (Crimean Tatar) ('I've pledged')
- Map of the Crimean People's Republic
- Status: Self-proclaimed autonomy of the Russian Republic
- Capital: Bakhchysarai
- Common languages: Crimean Tatar; Russian; Ukrainian
- Government: Republic
- President
  - 1917–1918: Noman Çelebicihan
- Legislature: Qurultay
- Historical era: World War I
  - Proclaimed: 13 December 1917
  - Soviet takeover: January 1918
  - Crimean Offensive: 13–25 April 1918
Preceded by	Succeeded by
Russian Republic; Taurida Governorate	Crimean Regional Government; Taurida SSR
- Today part of: Russia (disputed); Ukraine; (Note: Since the 2014 Russian annexation of Crimea the status of the Crimea and of the city of Sevastopol is under dispute between Russia and Ukraine; Ukraine and the majority of the international community considers the Crimea and Sevastopol an integral part of Ukraine, while Russia, on the other hand, considers (and administrators) the Crimea and Sevastopol an integral part of Russia.)

The Crimean People's Republic (Note: Crimean Tatar: Къырым Халкъ Джумхуриети, romanized: Qırım Halq Cumhuriyeti; Ukrainian: Кримська народна республіка, romanized: Krymśka narodna respublika; Russian: Крымская народная республика, romanized: Krymskaja narodnaja respublika) or Crimean Democratic Republic was a self-declared state that existed from December 1917 to January 1918 in the Crimean Peninsula. The Republic was one of many short-lived states that declared independence after the 1917 Russian Revolution caused the collapse of the Russian Republic.

== Brief history ==
=== Establishment ===
The Crimean People's Republic was declared by the initiative of the Kurultai of Crimean Tatars, which stipulated the equality of all ethnicities within the peninsula; the largest proportion of people living in the Crimea at the time were Russian (then comprising 42% of the population of the Crimea) or Ukrainian (11%). However, Crimean Tatars were for a while the dominant political and cultural force on the peninsula. Noman Çelebicihan was chosen as the first President of the nascent Republic.

The Qurultay consisted of 76 delegates, four of whom were female (Şefiqa Gaspıralı, Anife Bоdaninskaya, Ilhan Tohtar, Hatice Avcı). The delegates were chosen from five counties: Yalta (24), Akmescit (19), Kefe (16), Kezlev (11), and Orkapy (6). Asan Sabri Ayvazov, long-time Crimean independence leader, journalist, and educator, was elected Chairman of the Kurultai.

The Kurultai, in opposition to the Bolsheviks, published a "Crimean Tatar Basic Law", which convened an All-Crimean Constitutional Assembly, established a board of directors as a provisional government, and erected a Council of National Representatives as a provisional parliament. The board of directors and the Central Council of Ukraine mutually recognized each other.

=== Bolshevik coup d'état ===
This attempt to build a new nation was quickly defeated by the Bolshevik dominated Black Sea Fleet. Already on 16 December 1917, the Bolsheviks captured Sevastopol, where the headquarters of the Black Sea Fleet was located, and dissolved the local council of deputies. Power in the city was transferred to the local revkom. The Bolsheviks were supported by some ships of the Black Sea Fleet. To defend itself, the Crimean government created a United Crimean Headquarters on 19 December 1917, which had at its disposal two cavalry and one infantry regiment of Crimean Tatars, as well as some Ukrainian and Russian formations that amounted to some thousand people. Several armed incidents took place during January 1918. On 14 January 1918, the Bolsheviks captured Simferopol, where they managed to arrest former President of Crimea (Head of Directorate) Noman Çelebicihan, who had just resigned on 4 January 1918. He was transferred back to Sevastopol and interned until 23 February 1918, when he was executed without trial. The body of Çelebicihan was thrown into the sea.

On the initiative of Çelebicihan on 10 January 1918, the Kurultai created a special commission that conducted talks with the Bolsheviks to stop the armed conflict in Crimea.

By the end of January 1918, the Bolsheviks had captured the whole of Crimea and dissolved both the Kurultai as well as the Council of National Representatives. The Red Terror engulfed the peninsula. With Çelebicihan in the Reds' custody, another leader of the Crimean Tatars, Cafer Seydamet Qırımer, managed to escape to the Caucasus across continental Ukraine. Many Crimean military formations retreated to the mountains. The government of Ukraine blockaded Crimea while trying to re-establish control over the Black Sea Fleet and the city of Sevastopol. Any Muslim supporting military formations on the way to Crimea was stopped. This in turn triggered a protest from the All-Russian Muslim military council. By the end of January 1918, the Ukrainian government itself was forced to declare war on the Russian SFSR due to the advancement of the Red Guard forces of Moscow and Petrograd into Ukraine without explicit notification.

The Bolsheviks briefly established the Taurida Soviet Socialist Republic on Crimean territory in early 1918 before the area was overrun by forces of the Ukrainian People's Republic and the German Empire. Some officials of the national government, such as Seydamet Qırımer, who managed to escape the Bolsheviks' terror sought political asylum in Kyiv and petitioned for military help from the advancing Ukrainian Army as well as the Central Powers.

== Government ==
On 28 December the Kurultai had established a republican government (Ükümet).

- Minister of Justice – Noman Çelebicihan (chairman)
- Minister of Defense – Cafer Seydamet Qırımer (also Minister of Foreign Affairs)
- Minister of Education – Amet Özenbaşlı
- Minister of Finance – Seyitcelil Hattat (also Minister of Foundation)
- Minister of Religion – Ahmet Şükrü

== See also ==
- Russian Civil War
- Ukrainian–Soviet War
