= Congress of the Enslaved Peoples of Russia =

The Congress of the Enslaved Peoples of Russia was a congress of representatives of different nationalities to discuss their political situation in the Russian Empire. It was held on 21–28 September [O.S. 8–15 September] 1917 in Kyiv, Ukraine.

== History ==
World War I and the February Revolution brought hopes that the various minorities in the Russian Empire could attain some freedoms. The congress was organized by the Ukrainian Central Rada to discuss these political aspirations and better coordinate their efforts. In total, there were 93 representatives of 20 nations, including Belarusians, Buryats, Georgians, Estonians, Jews, Lithuanians, Latvians, Crimean Tatars, Moldavians, Don Cossacks, and Cossacks. Polish and Finnish representatives did not participate as they had already proclaimed independence. The Russian Provisional Government was represented by Maksym Slavinsky, member of the Constitutional Democratic Party (Kadets). Latvians had ten representatives, including future Prime Minister Zigfrīds Anna Meierovics. Estonians were represented by future Minister of Foreign Affairs Ants Piip.

The congress resolved the Russia should be organized as a federation of nations that would grant autonomy to the various nations. Only Lithuanians, represented by nine men, including Augustinas Voldemaras, Antanas Tumėnas, and Juozas Tumas-Vaižgantas, demanded full independence. The congress elected the Council of the Peoples of Russia, chaired by Mykhailo Hrushevsky, and established journal Svobodnyi soiuz (Свободный союз, Free Union). However, due to the October Revolution, the council and the journal were short-lived.

== See also ==
- American Committee for the Liberation of the Peoples of Russia
- Anti-Bolshevik Bloc of Nations
- Free Nations of Post-Russia Forum
