= Milliy Firqa =

Political party in Crimea

Milliy Fırqa ملی فرقا
- Leader: Noman Çelebicihan
- Founder: Noman Çelebicihan; Asan Sabri Ayvazov; Cafer Seydamet Qırımer
- Split from: Socialist Revolutionary Party
- Ideology: Crimean Tatar nationalism; Pan-Turkism; Jadidism; Constitutionalism; Social liberalism; Federalism; Galievism

Party flag

Milliy Firqa (Crimean Tatar: ملی فرقا, romanized: Milliy Fırqa, cyrillized: Миллий фыркъа, pronounced [mɪlˈlij fɯɾˈqɑ]; lit. 'National Party') was a Muslim political group in Crimea, which transferred en masse to the Bolsheviks during the Russian Civil War. Noman Çelebicihan, Asan Sabri Ayvazov, and Cafer Seydamet Qırımer established the group in 1917. At the time, they eventually seized control of the state in an attempt to foster a Crimean Tatar identity. Soviet authorities banned the party in 1921.
