= Noman Chelebidjikhan =

Crimean Tatar politician and mufti (1885-1918)

Mufti Noman Çelebicihan
- نعمان چلبى جهان
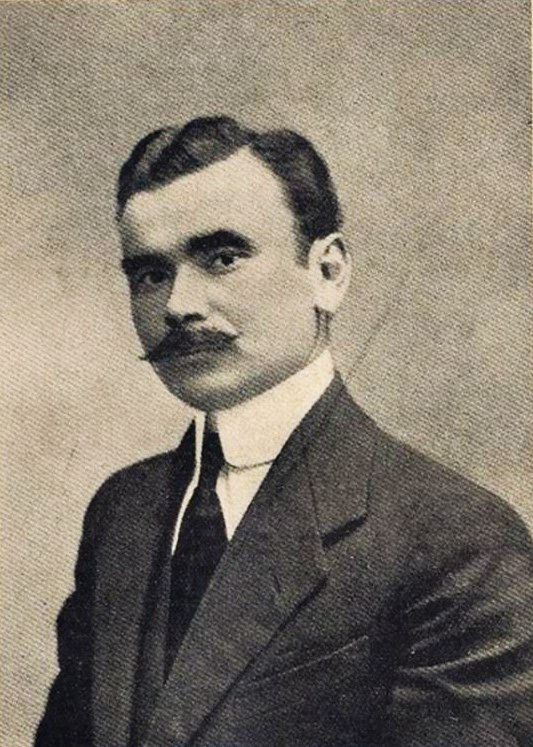
- Noman Çelebicihan

President of the Crimean People's Republic
- In office 9 December 1917 – 4 January 1918
- Preceded by: Office established
- Succeeded by: Position abolished

Personal details
- Born: c. 1885 Büyük Sonaq, Perekopsky Uyezd, Taurida Governorate, Russian Empire
- Died: 23 February 1918 Sevastopol, Taurida Soviet Socialist Republic
- Cause of death: Execution by firing squad
- Party: Milliy Firqa
- Education: Istanbul University Faculty of Law
- Occupation: Politician, lawyer, writer and poet

Religious life
- Religion: Islam
- Denomination: Sunni
- Jurisprudence: Hanafi
- Creed: Maturidi
- Profession: Mufti

Muslim leader
- Based in: Crimea
- Post: Mufti of Crimean Muslims
- Period in office: 1917–1918

Noman Çelebicihan (Crimean Tatar: نعمان چلبى جهان; 1885 – 23 February 1918) was a Crimean Tatar politician, lawyer, writer, and mufti of Crimean Muslims. He was the President of the short-lived independent Crimean People's Republic, established on November 26 (December 9 under the Gregorian Calendar), 1917. He is best known for his authorship of the poem "Ant etkenmen" (lit. 'I've Promised'), which became the Crimean Tatar national anthem. His early death at the hands of Bolshevik forces during the Russian Civil War is still commemorated in the Crimean Tatar nation.

== Biography ==
Noman Çelebicihan was born in 1885, in the village of Büyük Sonaq, in Chonhar region of Crimea near the present-day city of Dzhankoy. Today the village does not exist and in 1948–68 was known as Chirik village within the Zavet Lenin rural council.

His father's name was İbraim Çelebi, a member of a well-to-do Crimean Tatar family. His mother also was from a well-to-do family, daughter of Cihanşah Çelebi. He received his early education in his village. Afterwards, due to lack of opportunity, Çelebicihan was sent to Gülümbey Medrese, one of the well known madrassas of that time, with the help of his uncles. Later on he was sent to Constantinople to further his education.

Noman Çelebicihan arrived in Istanbul, Ottoman Empire in 1908. He attended Vefa Lisesi (High School) and later Law School. He resided in Karagümrük section of Constantinople where a small group of Crimean Tatar students lived. One of the first organizations he founded, while a student in Constantinople, was "Yaş Tatar Yazıcılar Cıyını" (Young Tatar Writers' Association). He founded this association with his friend Abibulla Temircan in 1910 and published his first literary works such as Qarılğaçlar Duası (Swallows' Prayer), Altın Yarıq (Golden Light) and Şiirler Cönkü (Collection of Poems). He was one of the original founders of "Crimean Tatar Student Association" and also "Vatan" (Homeland), which became the seed for the political organization Milliy Fırqa (National Party) to carry on the independent movement in Crimea during the most turbulent period in its history.

After graduating from Law School, Çelebicihan returned to Crimea to get involved in the independence movement, and was elected to represent the Or region of Crimea in the Crimean Tatar Qurultay. He was one of the most popular delegates because of his young age and education he received in Istanbul. In 1917 he founded the Milliy Fırqa and later that year, during the opening of the Qurultay on 26 November 1917, Noman Çelebicihan was elected the first president of the young Crimean Republic.

Çelebicihan was not only the president of the independent Crimean People's Republic and Mufti of Crimea, Lithuania and Poland. He was also a poet and writer. In addition to his aforementioned works, his poems such as Ant Etkenmen (I've Pledged), Bastırıq (Prison), Ay gidi... (Oh for...), Savlıqman Qal Tatarlıq! (Farewell Tatarness!), Yolcu Ğarip (Poor Traveler), and Tilkiden Selâm (Greetings from the Fox) are his most popular poems. Ant Etkenmen became the lyrics of the Crimean Tatar national anthem. His most memorable poem, however, is Savlıqman Qal Tatarlıq!, which he scribbled on the walls of Simferopol train station on his way to report to military service during World War I.

In January 1918, barely two months after he was elected to lead his nation at the Qurultay of the Crimean Tatar people, the Bolshevik forces invaded Crimea. He was arrested and imprisoned in Sevastopol. On 23 February, a firing squad of the Black Sea Fleet executed him and unceremoniously threw his body into the sea without affording him a proper Islamic burial.

He is still remembered today as a hero among Crimean Tatars. The Noman Çelebicihan Battalion is named after him.

== See also ==
- Crimean Tatars
- Crimean Tatar language
- List of Crimean Tatars
- Noman Çelebicihan Battalion
