= Ishig =

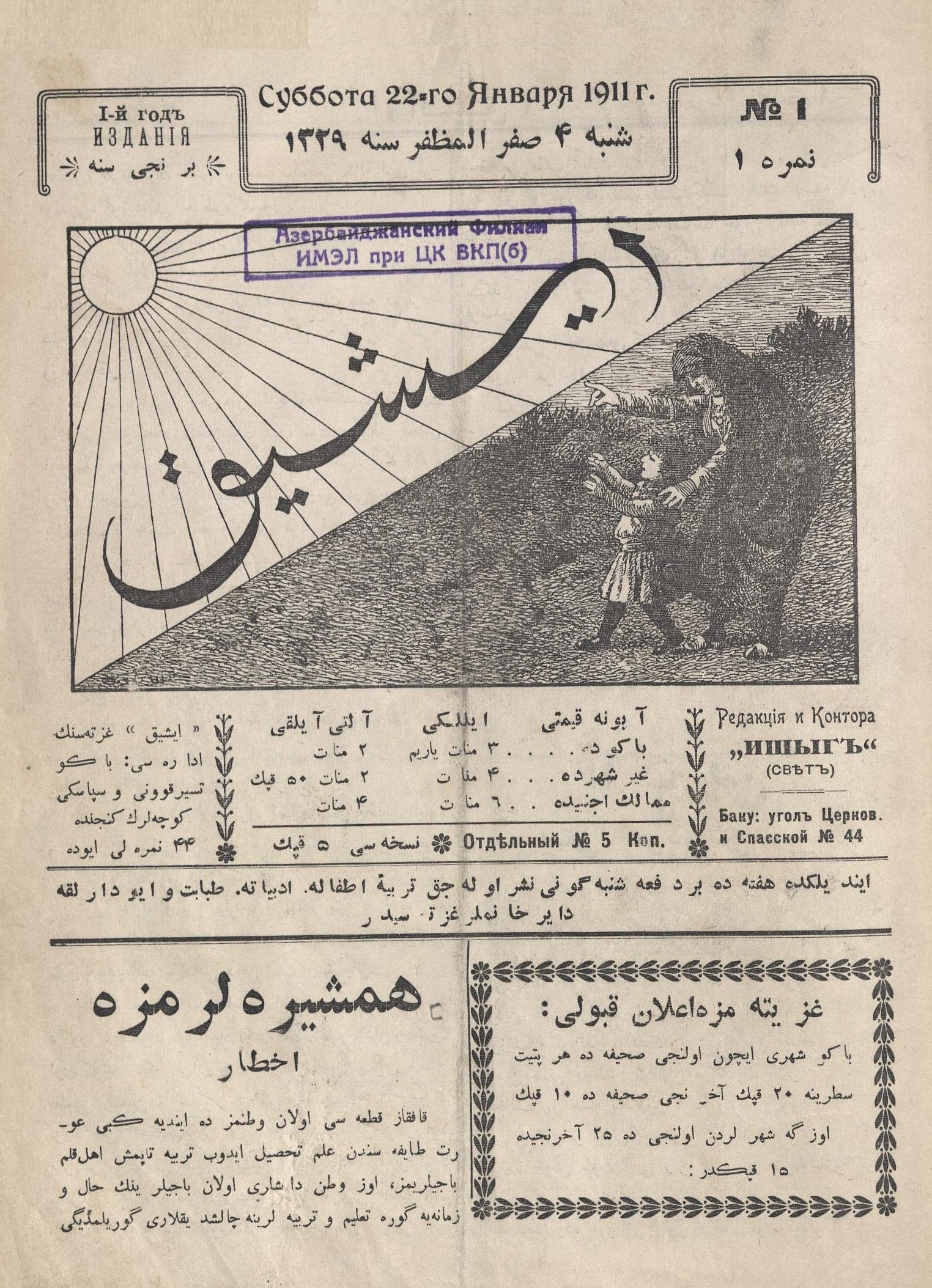
- Type: Weekly
- Publisher: Mustafa Bey Alibeyov
- Editor-in-chief: Khadija Alibeyova
- Founded: 22 January 1911
- Language: azerbaijani
- Country: Russian Empire

Ishig was the first Azerbaijani-language women's publication. The first issue of the newspaper was published on January 22, 1911, and its publication continued until the end of 1912, during which 68 issues were released.

== Background ==
Although the first women's publication in Russia Empire was the magazine Nevinnoye uprajneniya (Russian: Невинное упражнение - "Innocent Exercises"), edited by Princess Dashkova in the 18th century, the advocacy magazine for women's rights, Soyuz jenshin (Russian: Союз женщин - Women's Union), was published between 1907 and 1909. In the social life of Russian Turks, the first women's magazine was Alem-i-nisvan. It was edited by Şefiqa Gaspıralı, the daughter of Ismail bey Gasprinski, the editor of the Terciman newspaper. Meanwhile, in the Ottoman Empire, there were two publications for women - the weekly illustrated magazines Kadinlar Gazetesi and Nisvan.

In the early years following Azerbaijan's Sovietization, the magazine Sharg gadini (Oriental woman) was published in Baku. Although presented as the country's first women's publication, prior to this, there was another publication in the same vein: the newspaper Ishig. However, due to its characterization as "bourgeois press" during the Soviet era, it has been overlooked in research.

== History ==
The first issue of the magazine was published on January 22, 1911. Financial support for the newspaper was provided by Zeynalabdin Taghiyev. The publisher of the newspaper was the publicist and lawyer Mustafa bey Alibeyov, and its editor was his wife, Khadija Alibekova. From the annotations found on the final pages of the 1911 issues, it is apparent that these issues were printed at Hashim bey Vazirov's "Seda" printing press. The issues for the year 1912, however, were printed at the printing press of the Baku City Police Department.

Ishig was published once a week, on Saturdays, covering scientific-pedagogical, literary, medical, and household topics. Alongside child rearing, literature, medicine, and homemaking, it also featured various sections related to law, culture, religious rules, and world news. On the cover of the magazine, there was an image of a young woman wearing a head covering, holding a child's hand and pointing to the rising sun, which emitted light (a reference to the newspaper's title: in Azerbaijani, "işıq" means "light").

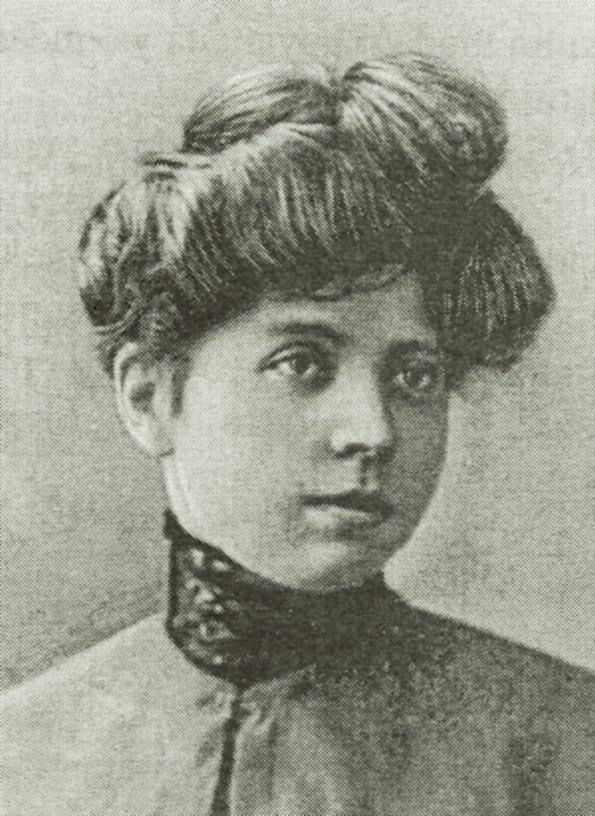
Khadija Alibeyova, the editor of the Ishig newspaper.

The main mission of the newspaper was to educate women and advocate for their rights. Women frequently submitted articles and poems to the newspaper, addressing criticisms of the unjust lives of women. Prominent Azerbaijani figures such as Mahammad Hadi, Yusif Vazir Chamanzaminli and Behboud Shahtahtinsky wrote congratulatory letters on the occasion of the establishment of the first women's press.

The newspaper was popular among Muslims throughout Russia empire. This is evidenced by the fact that about 200 copies of the newspaper were sent to subscribers outside the Caucasus. Russia State Library possesses a set of the newspaper Ishig for the year 1911, presented to Empress Alexandra Feodorovna. According to reports, anticipating the closure of the newspaper, Khadija Alibeyova had sent the 1st to 34th issues of Ishig to Empress.

As a result of pressure from religious conservatives, the newspaper began to face financial difficulties. Authors, cautious of clerics and religious conservatives, stopped sending letters, articles, and poems to the newspaper, while readers stopped subscribing. The scarcity of material and subscribers was not the only problem for the Ishig newspaper; In January 1912, after the assassination of Molla Ruhulla Mehmedzadeh, who protected the newspaper from radical clerics, the newspaper lost its "backbone" and was forced to cease its publication three months later. Thus, the Ishig newspaper ended its activity with its last issue on April 21, 1912.

According to Amaliya Qasimova, one of the main researchers of the Ishig newspaper, during the Soviet rule, the newspaper failed to establish its place in history as a pioneer of women's press in Azerbaijan, because, the newspaper was considered "bourgeois press" and remained outside of research and the magazine Şərq qadını (Azərbaycan qadını) heralded as the first women's press in the country.

== Content ==
The newspaper was structured into various sections, including: Təlimi-nisvan (Education for Women), Vəzayefe-beytiyyə (Household Affairs), Hüquqi-müslümə (Rights of Muslim Women) or Bacılarıma bir neçə söz (A Few Words to My Sisters), Təbabətə dair (About Medicine), Ədəbiyyat (Literature), Evdarlıq (Housekeeping), Xəbərlər (News) and Elanlar (Announcements). In the articles of the "Təlimi-nisvan" section of the Ishig newspaper, it was emphasized that a child's upbringing is closely tied to the upbringing of the parents, and the authors attempted to prove that education, knowledge, and learning are not only necessary for men, but perhaps even more so for women.

Editor Alibeyova wrote articles on family and household matters under the heading "Vəzayefe-beytiyyə" in the newspaper. She also frequently contributed to the "Təbabətə dair" section along with Amina Batrishina.

In the articles titled "Our Rights," Khadija Alibeyova discussed a variety of topics, including gender equality, women's participation in education, culture, and social life, the establishment of women's clubs and vocational courses, child rearing, household responsibilities, and health issues.

Women complained about their rights and demanded education and schooling in the letters they sent to the editorial office.

== Criticisms ==
On one hand, the newspaper discussed the importance of cultural advancement and education, while on the other hand, it promoted the significance of wearing the veil and prioritized religious matters and emphasizes Islamic values. Khadija Alibeyova defended the rights of Muslim women to freedom and education in her articles, while also acknowledging the secondary role of women in the family.

Unlike other intellectuals, the publisher and editor of the Ishig newspaper made efforts to continue publishing without inciting the anger and hatred of the majority of the population, who were religiously conservative. They tried not to antagonize religious leaders, often dedicating a significant portion of their articles to Sharia issues, emphasizing the superiority of men over women, and attempting to gain the support of religious leaders, which they could achieve to some extent. One of them was the religious leader Molla Ruhulla Mahammadzade, who defended the newspaper against radical religious figures.

Such an approach to the issue contributed to the stern criticism from other intellectuals, educators, and most notably, the contributors of "Molla Nasreddin", who advocated for the complete freedom of women, the abolition of the veil, and equal rights for women in all areas. The Molla Nasreddin and Ishig newspapers frequently published harsh articles against each other. Contributors of Molla Nasreddin condemned the editor and publisher of the Ishig newspaper for hypocrisy, criticizing Khadija Alibeyova for emphasizing the necessity of adhering to Sharia in her articles and expressing positive views on women's modest dress, despite their strong objections. Prominent figures of the time, such as Jalil Mammadguluzadeh, Omar Faig Nemanzadeh, and Aligulu Gamgusar, also criticized the hesitant stance of Ishig regarding important issues like women's liberation.

Thus, the first women's newspaper in Azerbaijan had to withstand attacks from all sides - both from progressive intellectuals for its liberalism and from religious leaders and radical religious figures for its courage in demanding women's rights.

== Legacy ==
All issues of the Ishig newspaper was transculturally translated by the Political Documents Archive of the Presidential Administration of the Republic of Azerbaijan in 2020 and published in book format, consisting of 580 pages. Here are the compiled 47 issues of the newspaper, published between January 22, 1911, and April 21, 1912, (comprising 34 issues in 1911 and 13 issues in 1912).

On March 4, 2011, the 100th anniversary of the Ishig newspaper was celebrated at the Azerbaijan Press Council with the participation of members of the Press Council's management, female journalists, and representatives of media.

On September 12, 2014, as part of the project of the Azerbaijan Press Council, a presentation of the documentary film dedicated to the Ishig newspaper, Angle of incidence of light, (Azerbaijani: İşığın düşmə bucağı) written by screenwriter Baxtiar Garaca, took place.
