= Zöhrä Aqçurina =

Tatar journalist (1862–1903)

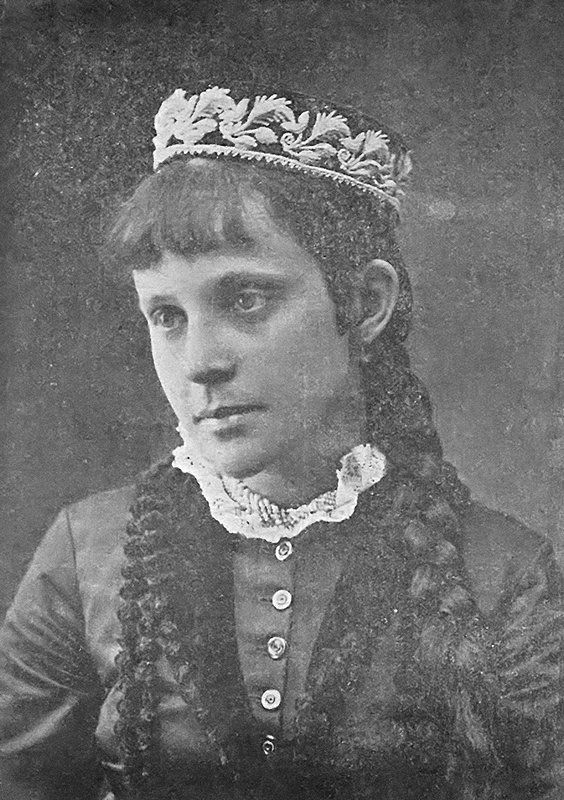
- Zöhrä Aqçurina, year unknown
- Born: 1862; Sviyazhsk, Russia
- Died: April 13, 1903 (aged 40–41); Bakhchysarai, Crimea
- Occupation: Journalist

Zöhrä Aqçurina (Tatar: Зөһрә Акчурина; Russian: Зухра Акчурина; 1862 – 13 April 1903) was a Russian journalist of Tatar origin. She was born in Sviyazhsk in 1862. Unlike most Tatar woman at the time, she received a secular education. She moved to Crimea in 1880. Here she met Ismail Gasprinsky, who hired her to work as a writer and translator for his magazine, Terciman. She died in Bakhchysarai on 13 April 1903.
