= Hidayat Charitable Society =

Azerbaijani NGO

- Hidayət xeyriyyə cəmiyyəti
- Formation: 1904; 122 years ago
- Type: NGO
- Legal status: charity
- Purpose: humanitarian
- Headquarters: Baku
- Location: Azerbaijan
- Key people: Haji Zeynalabdin Taghiyev, Isa-bey Hajinsky, Mirmuhammed Kerim Bakuvi, Molla Ruhulla Mammadzade, Ahmed-bey Aghaoglu, Mustafa-bey Alibeyov

The Hidayat Charitable Society is a society whose main goal was to fight robbers and murderers, to resist religious fanaticism in Azerbaijan. The board of the society, established in 1904, included Haji Zeynalabdin Taghiyev, Isa-bey Hajinsky, Mirmuhammed Kerim Bakuvi, Molla Ruhulla Mammadzade, Ahmed-bey Aghaoglu, Mustafa-bey Alibeyov and others. The members of the society were constantly persecuted by criminals and religious radicals for their views and actions.

== History ==
The charitable society "Hidayat" was founded in 1904 in Baku. The founders of the society were representatives of the clergy and intelligentsia. Their main goal was to fight the robbers who disturb the residents of Baku and the murderers, as well as the suppression of religious fanaticism. Members of the society identified people who harmed society and insulted women on the streets, and their names were presented to the governor-general for punitive measures to be taken against them. The charitable society "Hidayat" consisted of ten members among them were Haji Zeynalabdin Taghiyev, Isa-bey Hajinsky, Mirmuhammed Kerim Bakuvi, Molla Ruhulla Mammadzade, Ahmed-bey Aghaoglu, Mustafa-bey Alibeyov and others. The charter of the society was written by Ahmed-bey Aghaoglu.

With the assistance of the society, on 17 November 1906, measures were taken against several robbers and hooligans. One of them was Meshadi Haji oglu, who lived in Novkhani. Years later, on 16 January 1912, he took revenge on a member of the society, Molla Ruhulla Mammadzade, by killing him in his own house. The secretary of the society, Mustafa-bey Alibeyov, participated in the trial on the murder case, which took place in 1913.

The Hidayat society opposed religious fanaticism, the “shahsey-vakhsey” rite, which imitates the suffering and death of Imam Hussein and is accompanied by self-flagellation, and other similar rituals. Society appealed to people with a call to abandon these rituals, since they only bring harm to them. And the secretary of the society, Mustafa-bek Alibeyov, wrote an article about this in the Irshad newspaper. This treatment of anger is taken up by the city's religious fanatics. Some even demand the beheading of Mirmuhammed Kerim Bakuvi and Mustafa-bey Alibekov, members of the society. Later, they set in fire the door of Mirmuhammed Kerim's house. Mustafa-bey Alibeyov does not leave his house for some time so as not to be persecuted.

The secretary of the society, Mustafa-bey Alibeyov, takes the initiative to create an oil company "Hidayati-Islamiya" under the society in order to get rid the Baku oil from the monopoly of foreign capital and use it for the benefit of the people. To this end, he develops the charter of the company, consisting of 27 points.
