= Alem-i Nisvan =

Crimean Tatar magazine (1906-1912)

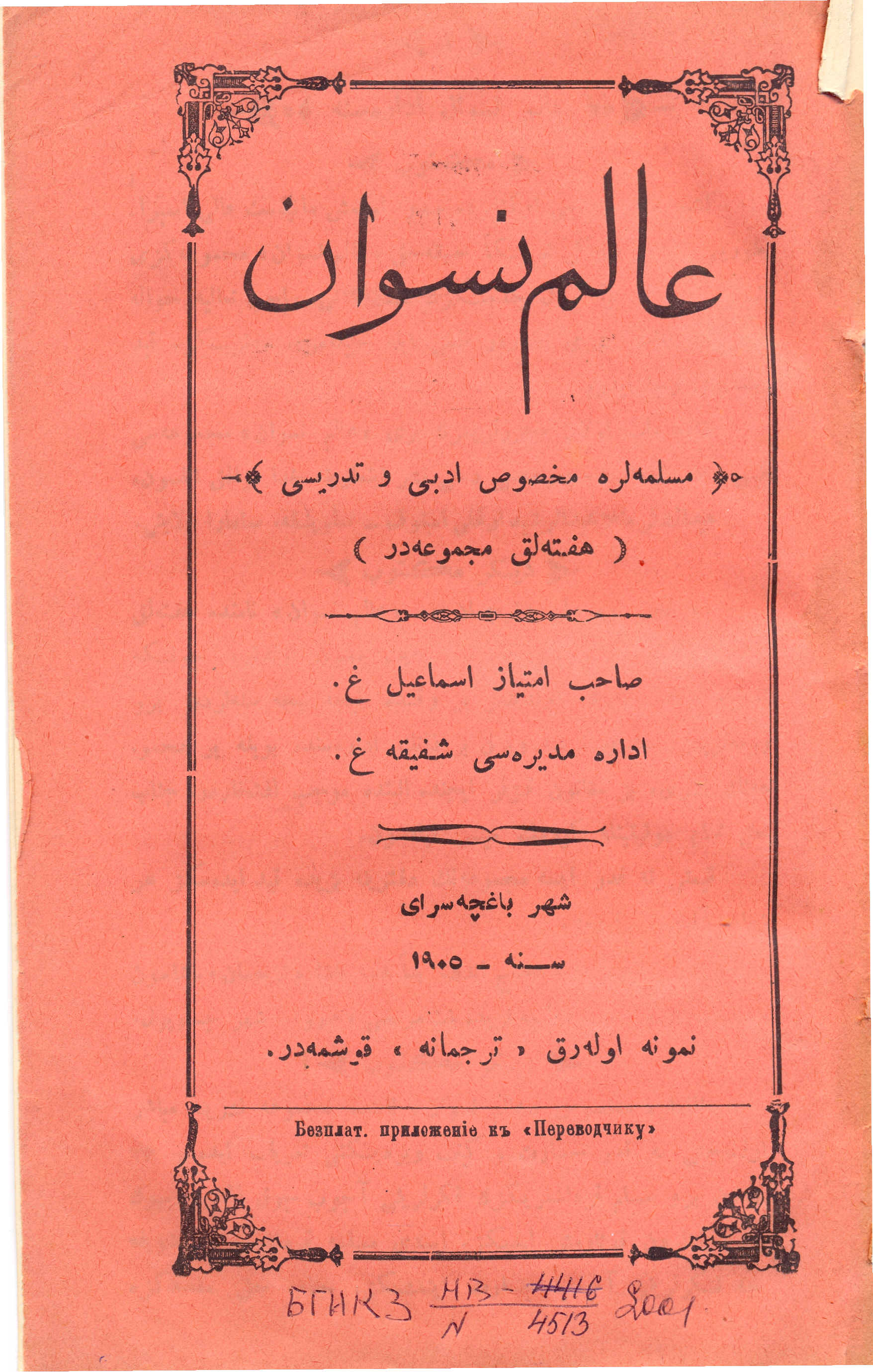
- Editor: Şefiqa Gaspıralı
- Founder: Ismail Gasprinsky
- First issue: 3 March 1906
- Final issue: 1911
- Based in: Bakhchysarai
- Language: Crimean Tatar (Arabic script)

Alem-i Nisvan (Crimean Tatar: عالم نسوان, lit. 'Women's World') was a Crimean Tatar magazine oriented towards women and published from 1906 to 1911. Founded by leading Crimean Tatar intellectual and journalist Ismail Gasprinsky, it was under the editorship of his daughter Şefiqa Gaspıralı throughout its entire existence.

== History ==
The concept of a Crimean Tatar magazine for women was promoted by leading intellectual and journalist leader Ismail Gasprinsky. Though issues corresponding to the women's community were occasionally brought up in Gasprinsky's popular Terciman, Gasprinsky felt that a magazine devoted specifically to women was necessary. As a result, Alem-i Nisvan was created, with Gasprinsky's daughter, Şefiqa Gaspıralı, serving as editor, and Gasprinsky serving as publisher.

Another significant person in the creation of Alem-i Nisvan was Gasprinsky's wife, Zehra Akçurina-Gaspıralı. Akçurina-Gaspıralı had previously attempted unsuccessfully to establish a female-oriented Crimean Tatar publication, called Terbiye, in 1887. Gasprinsky also sought to supplement the newspaper Kadın (lit. 'Woman') on a bimonthly basis, but the authorities of the Russian Empire were opposed to these endeavours until the aftermath of the 1905 Russian Revolution, when subsequent political reforms allowed for such a magazine to be published.

The purpose of the magazine was to educate Crimean Tatar women, who generally lacked education due to the social conservatism guiding Crimean Tatar society at the time. The elimination of illiteracy, growth of Crimean Tatar culture, and education of sharia were primary goals. It published both information on the status of women under sharia and secular instructions on hygiene, housework, and sewing. There was also a section devoted to science and literature. Included in the pages of Alem-i Nisvan were biographies of famous women, stories from foreign countries, and fiction.

From its 1906 founding until 1908, Alem-i Nisvan functioned as a free weekly supplement to Terciman. From 1908 to 1909, it operated as an independent newspaper, before returning to Terciman in 1910. The last issue of Alem-i Nisvan was published in 1911. In 1905, after the liberalization of legislation, the new magazine received the right to live.

== Legacy ==
In 2011, a conference dedicated to the 105th anniversary of Alem-i Nisvan's founding was held at the Crimean Engineering and Pedagogical University. The modern Crimean Tatar women's magazine Arzı (lit. 'Dream') considers itself to be a direct descendant of Alem-i Nisvan.
