= Khadija Alibeyova =

Azerbaijani educator, publicist

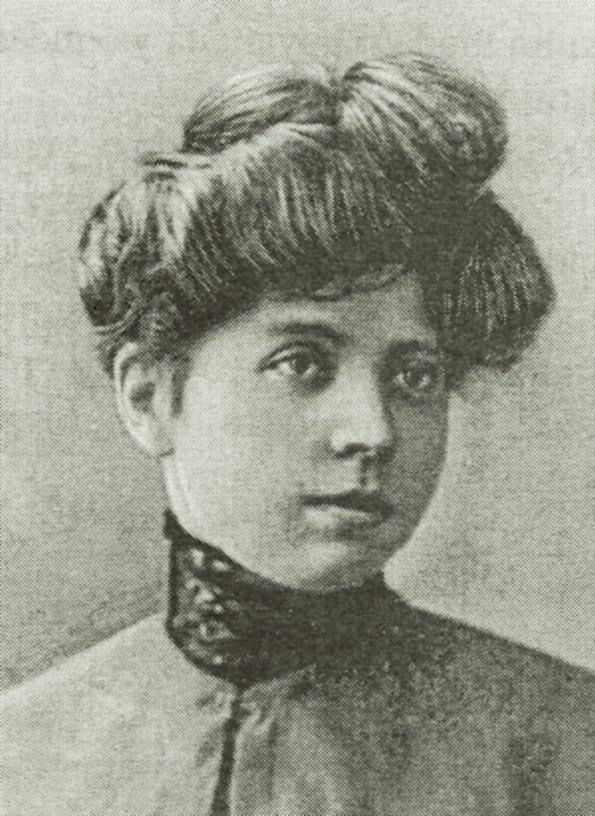
- Born: 1884; Tbilisi, Tiflis Governorate, Russian Empire
- Died: 1961 (aged 76–77); Baku, Azerbaijan Soviet Socialist Republic, USSR
- Occupations: contributing editor, physician
- Known for: Being the first Azerbaijani female editor
- Spouse: Mustafa Bey Alibeyov

Khadija Alibeyova (Azerbaijani: Xədicə Əlibəyova, 1884 – 1961) was the first female editor in Azerbaijan, and also an educator, publicist and publisher. She is also credited as the first female gynecologist physician in Azerbaijan in some sources.

== Personal life and family ==
Khadija Subhangulova was born in 1884 in Tbilisi. Her father, Aladdin Subhanguliyev, was a respected intellectual in Tbilisi and was deeply committed to educating his daughter.

After graduating from the Tbilisi Girls Gymnasium, Khadija studied medicine at the Transcaucasian Olginski Institute of Obstetrics and Gynecology. She was married to the famous Azerbaijani lawyer and publicist Mustafa Bey Alibeyov in 1907. They had six children and one of them died at a young age. All five remaining children received higher education. Their daughter, Aruziyya Alibeyova, was the first economics doctor in Azerbaijan.

== Career ==
After her marriage to Alibeyov, she became more actively involved in social and cultural life. Khadija Alibeyova became a member of the Charitable Society of Baku Muslim Women. She was deeply involved in the social life of Azerbaijani women and in the work of women's aid organizations. On January 22, 1911, in Baku, the first women's press organ, "Ishig" newspaper, was established with Khadija Alibeyova as the editor and Mustafa bey Alibeyov as the publisher. The newspaper's editors and writers were mainly women. As stated by Alibeyova in the first issue of the newspaper, "the main purpose is to contribute to the general development through the education of women."

Alibeyova contributed a series of articles titled "Our Rights" in the "Ishig" newspaper. The main themes of her journalistic articles revolved around women's rights equality, encouraging their participation in education and culture, in public life, advocating for the opening of women's clubs and health issues. She also used to provide articles under the title "Vazayefe-beytiyye" ("Household Matters"), which were published in most issues of the newspaper. Additionally, Khadija and Amina Batrishina often wrote materials for the "Regarding Medicine" section.

Researcher Ragiba Mammadova writes in her study that the editor, Alibeyova, who felt the threat of the newspaper's closure, wrote a letter of request to send the single-issue to Empress Alexandra Fyodorovna, the wife of Tsar Nicholas II, and sought her permission. The Empress graciously granted her request.

In January 1912, following the assassination of Axund Molla Ruhulla Mahammadzade, who had been protecting the "Ishig" newspaper from radical believers, the newspaper lost its protector and had to cease publication three months later. Thus, on April 21, 1912, the first Azerbaijani women's newspaper, "Ishig", released its final issue.

In 1912, Alibeyova moved to Shaki and worked as a gynecologist from 1920 to 1946. In Shaki, she also involved in organizing literacy classes and a women's club. At the joint meeting of the former Baku City Executive Committee and the City Council in April 1925, with the initiative of Khadija Alibeyova and the participation of People's Commissar of Health, the opening of a women's consultation center in the city was deemed appropriate. Alibeyova also played a significant role in the opening of the medical college in Shaki, the organization of the maternity ward there, and the recruitment and training of Azerbaijani girls from the city and villages for this ward.

Towards the end of her life, she returned to Baku. She died in Baku in 1961.
