= Şefiqa Gaspıralı =

Crimean Tatar feminist leader

Şefiqa Gaspiralı
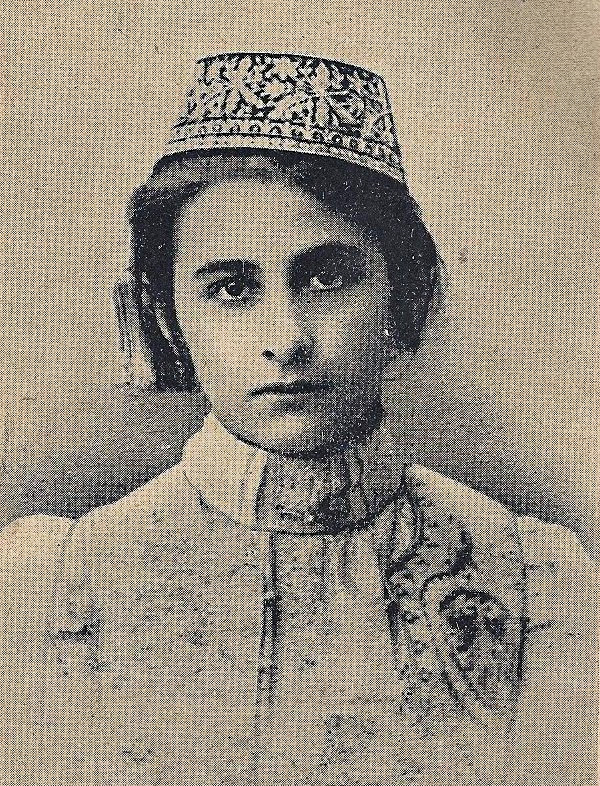
- Gaspiralı in 1901
- Born: 14 October 1886; Bakhchysarai, Taurida Governorate, Russian Empire (now Crimea)
- Died: 31 August 1975 (aged 88); Istanbul, Turkey
- Burial place: Zincirlikuyu Cemetery
- Occupations: Journalist; educator; politician; women's rights activist
- Spouse: Nasib bey Yusifbeyli

Şefiqa Gaspıralı (Russian: Шефика Исмаиловна Гаспринская, romanized: Shefika Ismailovna Gasprinskaya; (Note: In this name that follows East Slavic naming customs, the patronymic is Ismailovna and the family name is Gasprinskaya.) 14 October 1886 – 31 August 1975) was a Crimean Tatar feminist leader who was editor-in-chief and publisher of the first women's magazine, a member of the Presidency Council of the Kurultai, and a deputy for two terms in the Crimean People's Republic. She was also a kindergarten teacher.

== Early years ==
Şefiqa Gaspıralı was born to Ismail Gasprinsky (1851–1914), a Crimean Tatar thinker, publisher, educator, politician and reformer, one of the leaders of the Turkish cultural and political awakening in the early 20th century, in Bakhchysarai, Crimea (Taurida Governorate, Russian Empire) on 14 October 1886. Her mother was Zühre Gaspıralı, a member of the Akçora dynasty. Şefiqa had seven siblings, four brothers, Refat, Danyal, Mansur, Haydar and three sisters Behiye, Leyla, Nigar.

Gaspıralı learned to read and write from her father. She then continued his education at her father's "Usûl-ü Cedit" (New Method) School in Crimea. Her father chose and raised her among his siblings, gave special importance to her education. Her mother died when she was 17 years old. She took on the responsibility of the house.

== Journalist career ==
In spite of her domestic duties, she became her father's most important assistant in the management of the publications of the newspaper Terciman ("The Translator"), the correspondence and translation from Russian language, as well as the postal and distribution affairs. In 1903, she wrote her first article in Terciman.

During this time, she met Nasib bey Yusifbeyli of Ganja, a young Azerbaijani man, who often visited her father. Her correspondence on political issues with Yusifbeyli turned into intimacy, and they married in 1906.

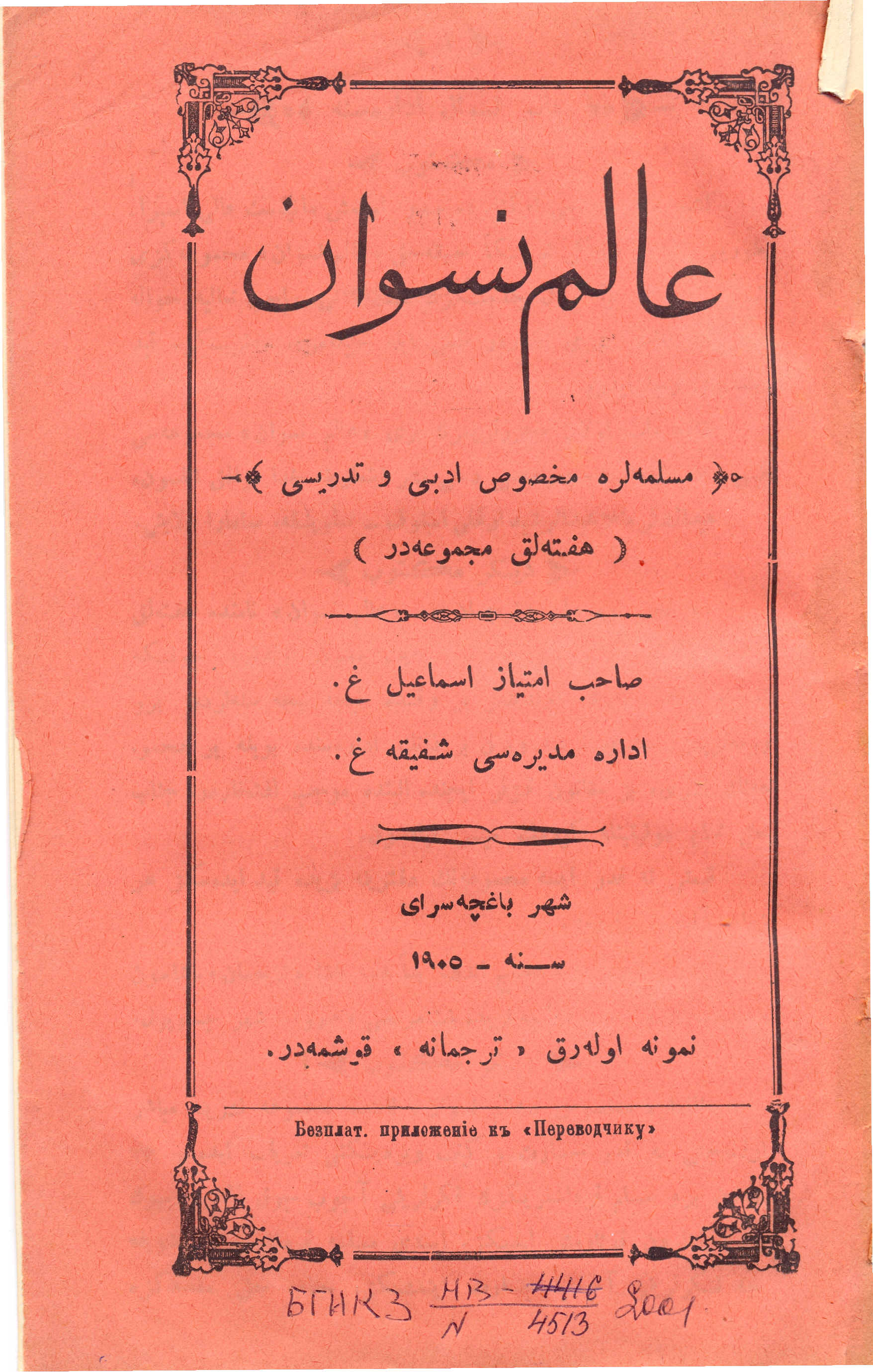
Cover of the magazine Alem-i Nisvan ("Women's World") (1906–1912)

İsmail Gaspıralı founded the magazine Alem-i Nisvan ("Women's World") in 1906 after realizing that Terciman was inadequate in matters of improving the low social status of women in Russia, women's education and employment. Şefiqa was appointed head of the magazine. Published articles informed, directed, encouraged and organized Turkic women, giving detailed information on women and women's movements in the Turkish and Islamic world.

In 1908, she gave birth to a daughter Zöhre, and a year later to a son Niyazi. During this period, she, together with her husband Nesip and her older brother Rıfat, assumed the entire burden of Terciman.

In 1912, Şefiqa and her husband Yusifbeyli moved to Ganja, Azerbaijan and settled there after the magazine Alem-i Nisvan was closed. At the end of that year, she returned home as no one could be found to deal with the newspaper Terciman. Her father İsmail Gaspıralı died on 11 September 1914.

== Women's rights activist and politician ==
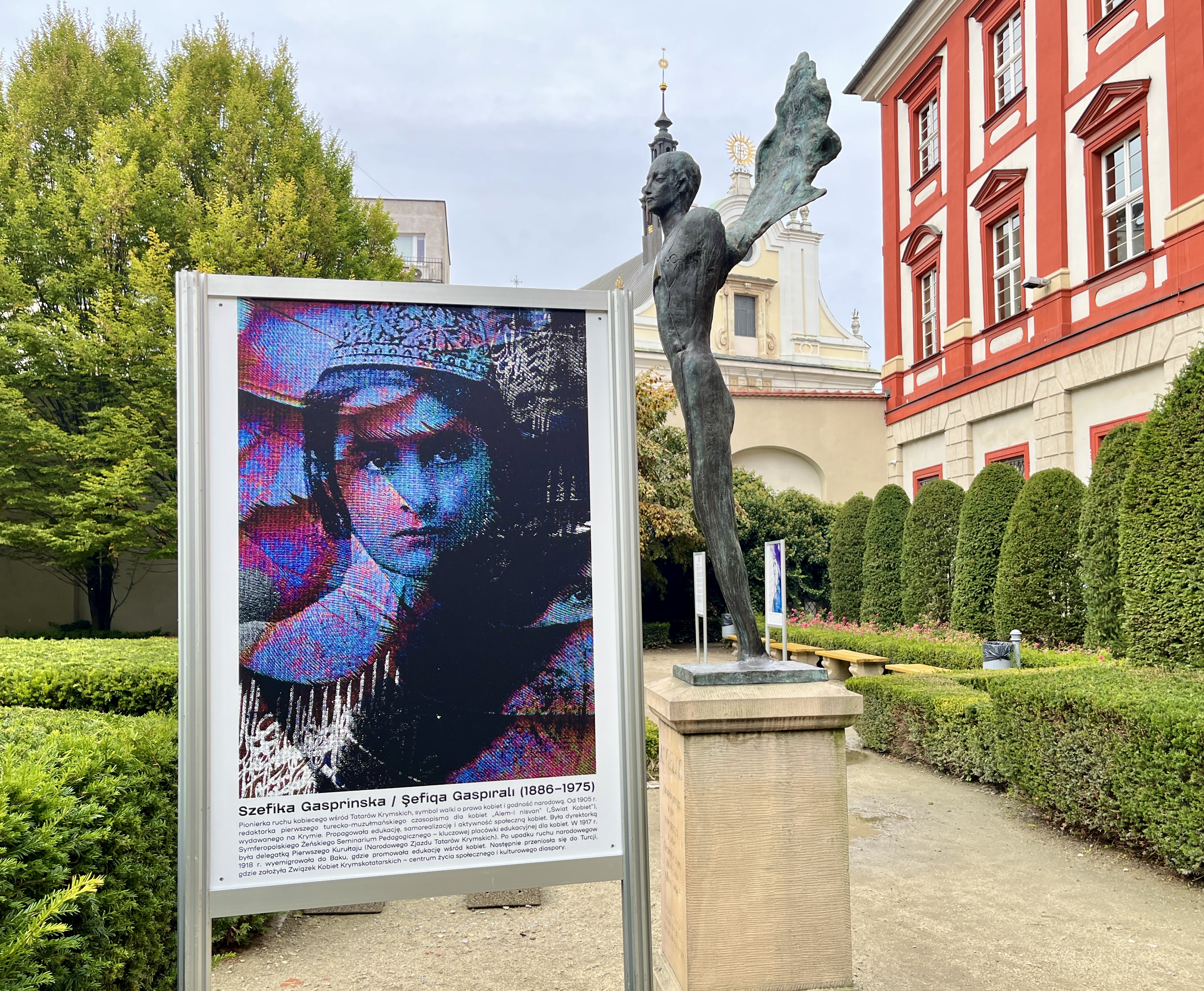
The stand dedicated to Şefiqa Gaspıralı at the exhibition «She is Crimea, She is World» by the Krymski Dom Foundation in Wrocław (Poland), October 2025

Turkic women living in the Russian Empire were excluded from social, political, cultural and economic life, neglected and deprived of education. Şefiqa was one of the pioneers to start a women's movement under these adverse conditions. All her life, Şefiqa Gaspıralı struggled with her schools, organizations and political participation efforts for the awakening of Turkic women, about which not many people cared.

Şefiqa became one of the first deputies of the short-lived First Crimean Congress of the Crimean People's Republic in 1917, with her recognition during her term as the editor-in-chief of themagazine Alem-i Nisvan. She also participated in the All-Muslims of Russia Congress within the Crimean delegation convened in Moscow.

Şefiqa Gaspıralı aimed to make Turkic women equal legally, socially and culturally in a male-dominated understanding of administration and society in all respects.

Crimea had two advantages over other regions for the socio-cultural and political development of Turkic women: First, it was the birthplace of the innovation and modernization movement initiated by İsmail Gaspıralı. Secondly, compared to the Caucasus and Turkestan, Crimean women suffered less from polygamy and veiling. However, when the 1917 Revolution began, due to the absence of a unifying female leader, there was no other women's organization other than the Taze Hayat Cemiyet ("Fresh Life Society") in Yalta. İsmail Gaspıralı's efforts against the narrow-minded people, who were against the full and equal participation of women in social and political life, yielded results, albeit slowly, but to achieve real success with the support of the society, he needed a female leader, even leaders, who could influence the masses in the way of "women's organization" was needed.

Intellectual women and teachers were working in the central organization of women's committees. Şefiqa Gaspıralı was the chief among them. She was trying to encourage women to increase their activities by making contacts. In addition to her, especially İlhamiye Toktar, Ayşe İshak and Hatice Avcı were the names working on this path. Bakhchysarai and Akmescit (Simferopol) branches of these committees were personally led by Şefiqa Gaspıralı. Another duty of Gaspıralı was her membership in the City Council of Bakhchysarai, she was elected.. During this period, she was nominated for the mayor of Bakhchysarai, but he rejected the candidacy due to the intensity of her work.

== Leaving Crimea for Azerbaijan ==
In 1919, Şefiqa Gaspıralı fled under the threat of death from Crimea to Azerbaijan with her two young children. Two years later, the Azerbaijan Democratic Republic was occupied by the Red Army. Her husband, Prime Minister of Azerbaijan Nasib bey Yusifbeyli (in office: 14 April 1919 – 1 April 1920) was shot dead on 31 May 1920. Memduh Şevket (Esendal), the Baku representative of the Grand National Assembly of Turkey, extends a helping hand to Şefiqa Gaspıralı, who has to escape death for the second time.

== Emigration to Turkey ==
With fake Ottoman identity documents and passport prepared, she emigrated for the last time with her two children on the train, which was also provided by Memduh Şevket, carrying the captive Turkish soldiers and aid ammunition to Turkey. Besides, newspapers and magazines published in Turkish such as Tercüman (The Translatoré), Vakit ("The Time"), Kazan Muhbiri ("The Reporter of Kazan"), Burhan-ı Terakki ("The Witness of Progress"), Ülfet ("Familliarity") published in Russia between 1883 and 1920, and in Russian such as Kaspi, Golos Tatar, original letters, leader staff-level political correspondence, congress and meeting minutes, resolutions, conference texts, important clippings, bylaws, regulations, road permits, hotel invoices corresponding to the dates of the congress, declarations, photographs, books, political documents submitted to official authorities. Petitions with content, Duma (Russian Parliament) documents, candidate lists for elections, delegate cards, parliamentary mandates, bills, brochures, invitations, delegate badges, official correspondence of organizations such as the "Muslim Alliance", "Society of Auspice", "Women's Committees", National Council" etc. She also brought a large archive of documents.

She lived for 54 years in Turkey, where she came when she was 35, and expanded her archive by enriching the documents she brought with her. To earn a living in Turkey, Şefiqa Gaspıralı first sold a few jewellery heirlooms from her mother. Then, she got a short-term job at a hospital. When she left there, she sewed for a while and took typing lessons. She worked as a director in "Daru'l-eytam" ("Orphanage"; Child Protection Institution). After the closure of the orphanage, she became unemployed again. She even sold her wristwatch due to poverty. Finally, she found a temporary job with a monthly salary of 40 liras. Gaspıralı's three siblings were also in Istanbul. Her brother Cevdet Mansur, a student at "Darülfünun1 (Istanbul University) stayed in a student dormitory not to be a burden to his sister. Her other brother Haydar Ali, a student at the Medical School, stayed with Şefiqa until his graduation. Her youngest siblings included her sister Nigar, who was married to Süleyman, who was a steward. Her older brother Rifat died in December 1925 in Crimea. Şefiqa Gaspıralı was helpless for his daughter and son-in-law.

Şefiqa Gaspıralı continued her social and cultural activities in Turkey. After working as the director of the orphanage and taking an active role in the Crimean Tatar diaspora, she founded and chaired the "Kırım Tatar Kadınlar Birliği" ("Crimean Tatar Women's Union") in 1930. Gaspıralı also served in the Red Crescent ("Kızılay") for many years. She also wrote articles for the Crimea Magazine and Emel magazine. With her own life, Gaspıralı aimed to publish the Turkish Women's Movement in Russia as a book.

Şefiqa Gaspıralı died in Istanbul on 31 August 1975. She was buried at Zincirlikuyu Cemetery following the religious service held at Şişli Mosque.
