= Mustafa Bey Alibeyov =

Azerbaijani opinion journalist

- Azerbaijani: Mustafa bəy Əlibəyov
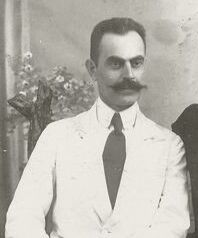

Mustafa Bey Alibeyov (1872, Nukha - 1945) was a publicist, writer, playwright, and lawyer.

He was the publisher of Ishig newspaper, a member of "Nijat" charity society, "Help to the needy" society, secretary of "Hidayat" charity society, and a member of Ahrar party.

== Life and education ==
Mustafa Bey Alibeyov was born in 1872 in the city of Sheki in Azerbaijan. In his first years of education, he learned the Arabic-Persian languages perfectly. He studied at the Russian-Tatar school in Sheki. He graduated from Tiflis gymnasium in 1892. During these years, he studied Russian and French.

== Career and social activity ==
In 1892, he started working as a translator of the chief investigator in the district court of Baku governorate. He was a member of "Nijat" charitable society. In addition to being famous as a lawyer, he was also known as a literary critic. He worked as a publicist, writer-playwright. He wrote his articles under the pseudonym "Yukharibashlı". This was due to the fact that he lived in the Yukharibash quarter of Sheki.

In 1905, he wrote the article "Absheron Oil Island", and in 1914, he wrote the play "Our bloody tears shed at the doors of the courts" and the libretto "The Executioner's Victim". The six-act play "Our Bloody Tears Shed at the Doors of the Courts" describes the arbitrariness and procrastination that took place in the tsar's courts and divans, the arbitrariness of Armenian officials and their insulting views of the people. He wrote the libretto "The Executioner's Victim" in Russian. The libretto also told about the tragedy of Ms. Gulbahar Akhriyeva, who was the head of H.Z. Taghiyev's Gymnasium for Girls.

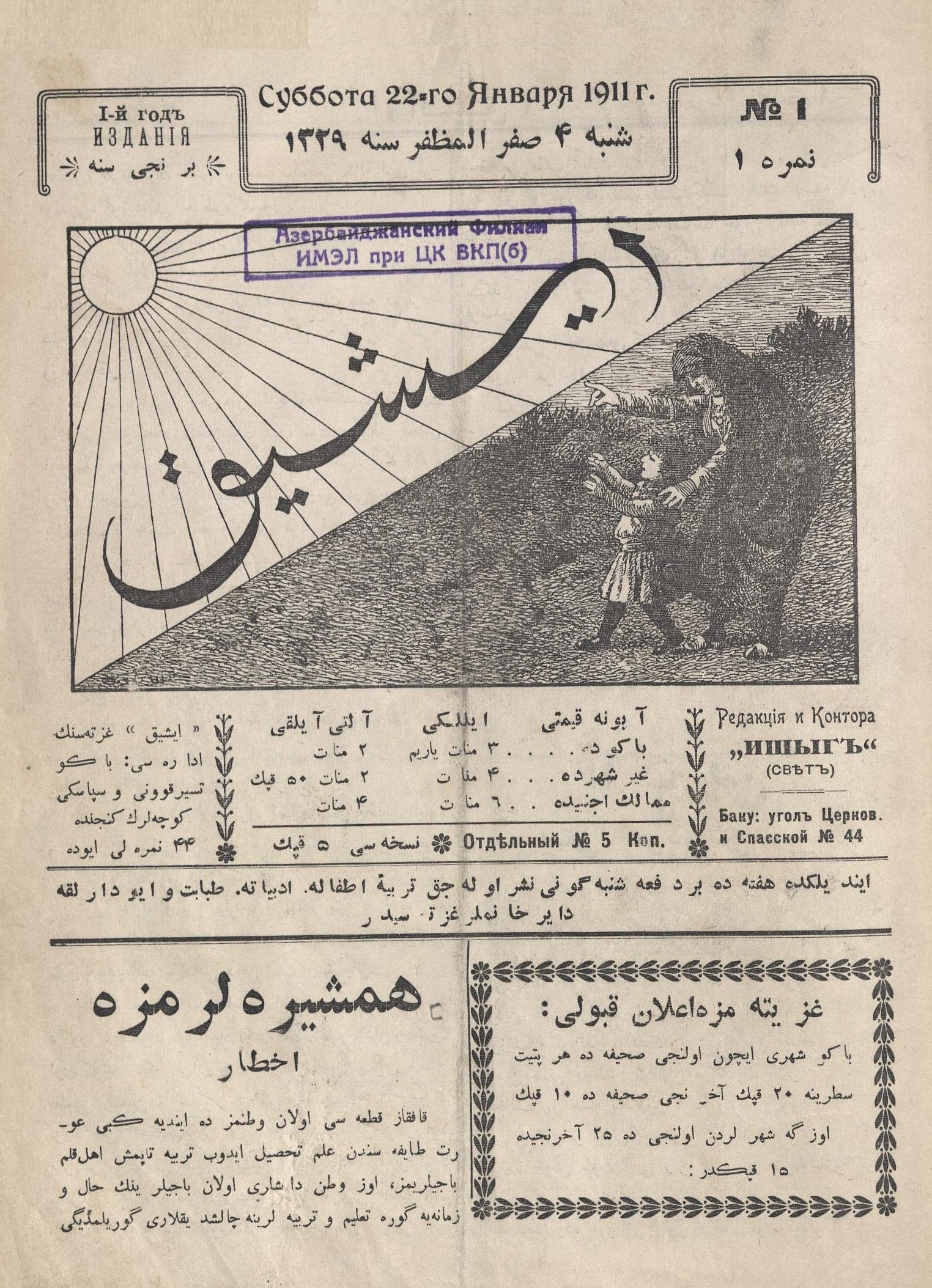
The cover of the first published issue of Ishig newspaper

In 1905, he was the secretary of the "Hidayat" charity society founded under the chairmanship of Haji Zeynalabdin Taghiyev. In order to save Baku oil from the monopoly of foreign capital and use it for the welfare of the people, he took the initiative to create the "Hidayati-Islamiyya" oil company under the society. For this purpose, he drafted the company's charter consisting of 27 points. The "Hidayat" society opposed religious fanaticism. The society appeals to the people that these customs and ceremonies only harm people. The secretary of the society, Mustafa Bey Alibeyov, wrote an article about this in "Irshad" newspaper. This appeal led to anger by the religious fanatics of the city. Some even demanded the beheading of some members of the community – Gazi Mir Muhammad Karim and Mustafa Bey Alibeyov. Later, they set Muhammad Karim's house door on fire. Mustafa Bey Alibeyov does not leave his house for some time to escape persecution.

On January 12, 1911, the first women's publication of Azerbaijan, "Ishig", whose editor was his wife Khadija Alibeyova, started publishing. The newspaper was published with the financial support of Haji Zeynalabdin Taghiyev. Since some of the articles in the newspaper were written in Russian, they were read outside of Baku in Tbilisi, Moscow, Yerevan, and Kyiv. The publication of the newspaper continued until the end of 1912, during which time 68 issues were issued. At different times, he appeared in the press with open and secret signatures. He was one of the main authors of “Basirat” newspaper published from April 1914 to 1920.

In 1913, he participated in the trial of Molla Ruhulla Mammadzadeh's murder.

He was among those who donated to the "Nuxa-Hürriyeti-Maarif Society", which started its activity in 1917.

After the February revolution, he started political activity and joined the "Ahrar" party. As a member of the "Help the Needy" society, opposed the acquisition of the weapons of the soldiers of the Wild Division and demanded the return of their weapons from the Baku Commissariat. He participated in the transfer of the Turkish military captives to the Ottoman state.

After the establishment of the Azerbaijani Democratic Republic, he became a member of the "Green pen" Union of Writers. Helped the population with food and clothes through the "Help to the Needy" organization.

In 1920, after the April invasion, he moved to Sheki, became a people's judge for significant cases, head of the law office, and a member of the "mudafiun team" in Ganja.

== Death ==
In 1937, he was subjected to repression. He was exiled to Siberia and sentenced to 8 years in prison. He died in 1945. The location of his grave is unknown.

== Family ==
Mustafa Bey Alibeyov's father was a scribe in the palace of Sheki Khan.

Mustafa Bey Alibeyov married Khadija Subhanguliyeva. She was born in Tbilisi in 1884. Here, after studying at the Russian-girl gymnasium, she graduated from the Transcaucasia Olginskaya Midwifery Institute. In 1908, together with 14 ladies, she participated in the opening of the women's department of the Salvation Society. He was the editor of the first women's publication of Azerbaijan, "Ishig". 5 children were born from this marriage.
