= Isa Bey Hajinski =

Azerbaijani businessman (1861–1919)

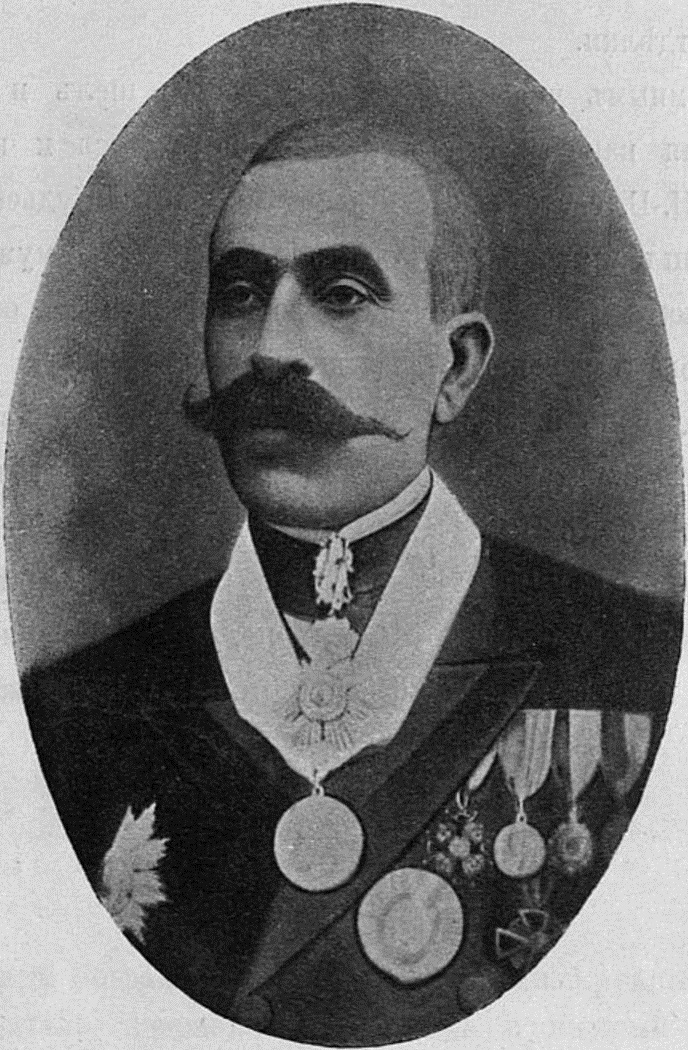
- Born: 1861; Baku, Russian Empire
- Died: January 22, 1919 (aged 57–58); Baku, Azerbaijan Democratic Republic
- Education: Home-educated
- Spouse: Kheyransa khanim Khanlarova
- Children: Sadikh bey, Ahmad bey, Ali bey and Zibeyda
- Parent: Abdulsalam Bey Hajinski
- Awards: Order of Saint Stanislaus

Isa Bey Hajinski (1861–1919) was an Azerbaijani wealthy landowner, industrial magnate, philanthropist, and owner of kerosene fabric in Black City district of Baku.

== Early life ==
Isa Bey Hajinski was born in Baku, Russian Empire (modern-day Azerbaijan) in 1861. He undertook his study at home and spoke several languages. Isa Bey was the hereditary owner of large landholdings from his father. He discovered vast deposits of oil in those lands, due to which he developed rapid entrepreneurial activities in the oil industry.

== Charitable activities ==
Isa Bey Hajinski, the honorable benefactor of the Alexander High School, increased his contribution from 800 to 1000 roubles per year and also, in 1913 he spent 1000 roubles for buying a cinematograph for the school. This was a rare phenomenon for schools of that time. He was also the first automobile owner in Baku. In November of the same year, Hajinski bought a summer house in Mineralnye Vody. Thus, students with weak health could spend their holidays and get treatment. Isa Bey Hajinski was also an honorable protector of Baku Gymnasium for Men. The education was paid at Gymnasium, but children of a poor family had a free education there. For the charitable activities of Isa Bey Hajinski, he was awarded two orders of Saint Stanislaus (of the third and fourth degree).

== Later life ==
After the death of Isa Bey Hajinski on January 22, 1919 for just over a year, his sons emigrated to France. The fate of Sadikh bey and Ahmad bey is unknown, except Ali Bey. The youngest son returned to Baku after World War II and then arrested. 15-year-old Zibeyda khanim and her mother, Kheyransa khanim lived in poverty after the death of Isa Bey.
