= Crimean Tatar language =

Kipchak Turkic language

Crimean Tatar
- Crimean
- qırımtatar tili, къырымтатар тили, قریم تاتار تلی qırım tili, къырым тили, قریم تلی
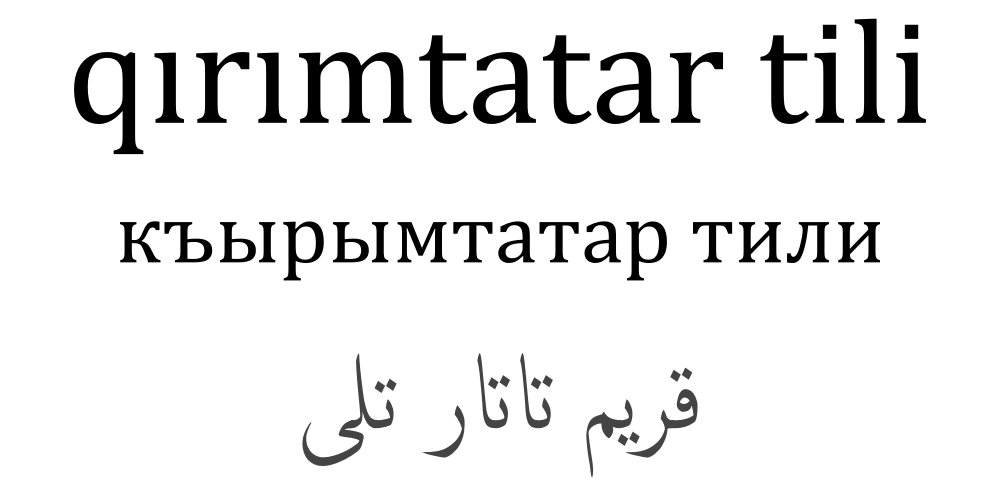
- Crimean Tatar in Latin, Cyrillic, and Perso-Arabic scripts.
- Native to: Ukraine, Romania, Bulgaria, Turkey, Uzbekistan, Russia, Kyrgyzstan
- Region: Eastern Europe and Southeastern Europe
- Ethnicity: Crimean Tatars
- Native speakers: (580,000 cited 2001)
- Language family: Turkic: Common Turkic; Kipchak; Kipchak–Cuman; Crimean Tatar
- Early form: Cuman
- Standard forms: Crimean Tatar; Crimean Tatar (Romania)
- Dialects: Northern; Central; †Southern; † Northeastern
- Writing system: Crimean Tatar alphabet (Latin and Cyrillic; previously Arabic)

Official status
- Official language in: Republic of Crimea (Russia) (Note: The status of Crimea and of the city of Sevastopol is since March 2014 under dispute between Russia and Ukraine; Ukraine and the majority of the international community consider Crimea to be an autonomous republic of Ukraine and Sevastopol to be one of Ukraine's cities with special status, whereas Russia considers Crimea to be a federal subject of Russia and Sevastopol to be one of Russia's three federal cities like Russians cities Moscow and Saint Petersburg.); Autonomous Republic of Crimea (Ukraine)
- Recognised minority language in: Romania; Ukraine

Language codes
- ISO 639-2: crh
- ISO 639-3: crh
- Glottolog: crim1257
- ELP: Crimean Tatar
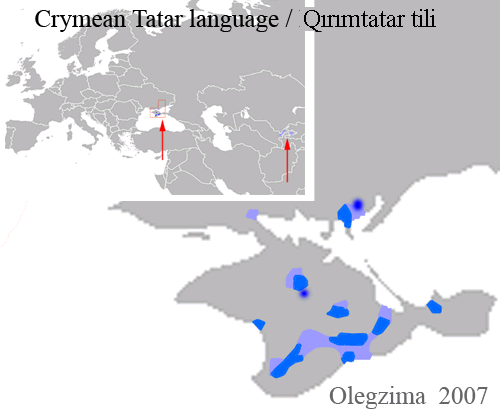
- Crimean Tatar-speaking world

- Crimean Tatar is classified as Severely Endangered by the UNESCO Atlas of the World's Languages in Danger.

Text in Crimean Tatar

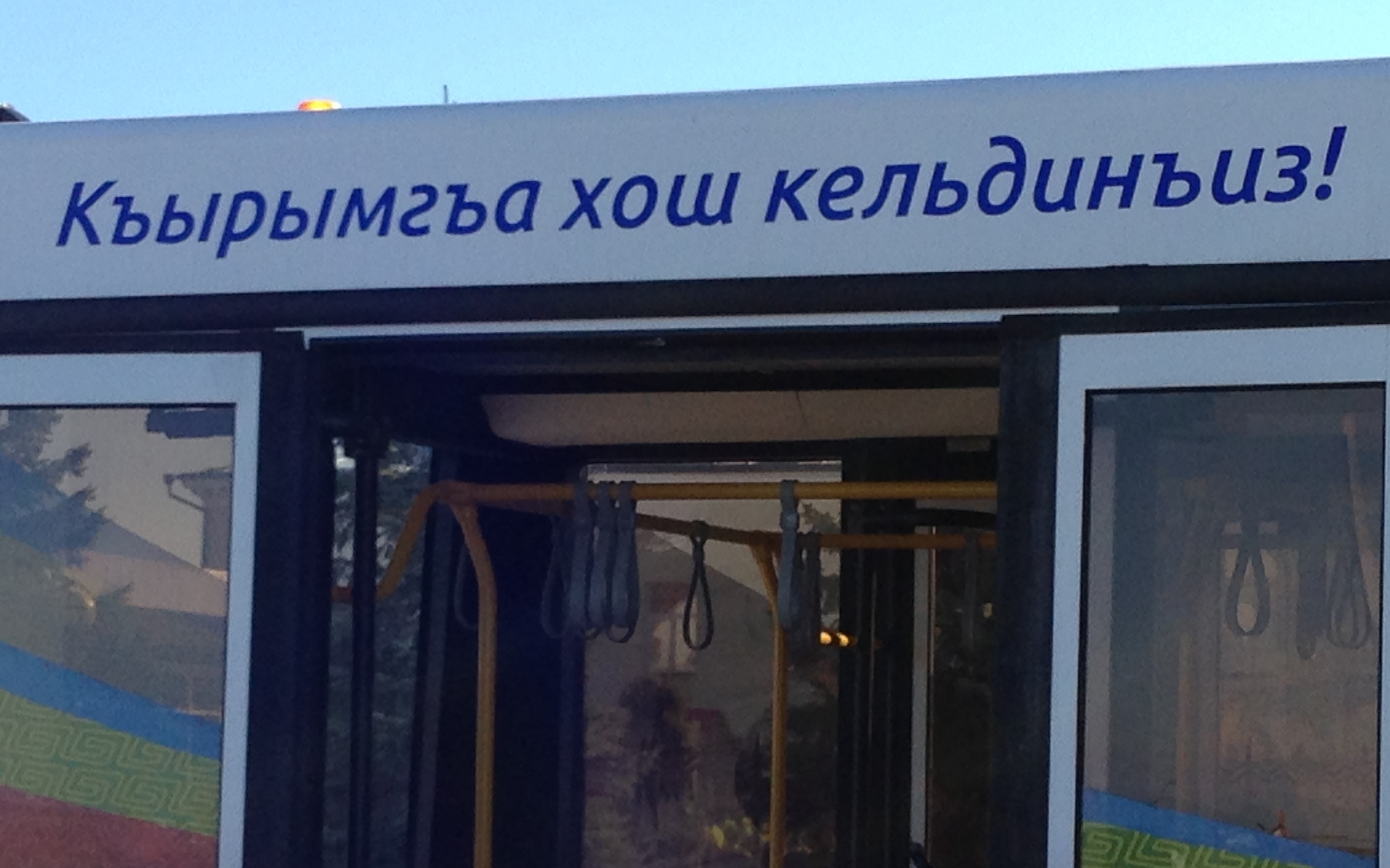
"Welcome to Crimea" (Qırımğa hoş keldiñiz!) written in Crimean Tatar Cyrillic, airport bus, Simferopol International Airport

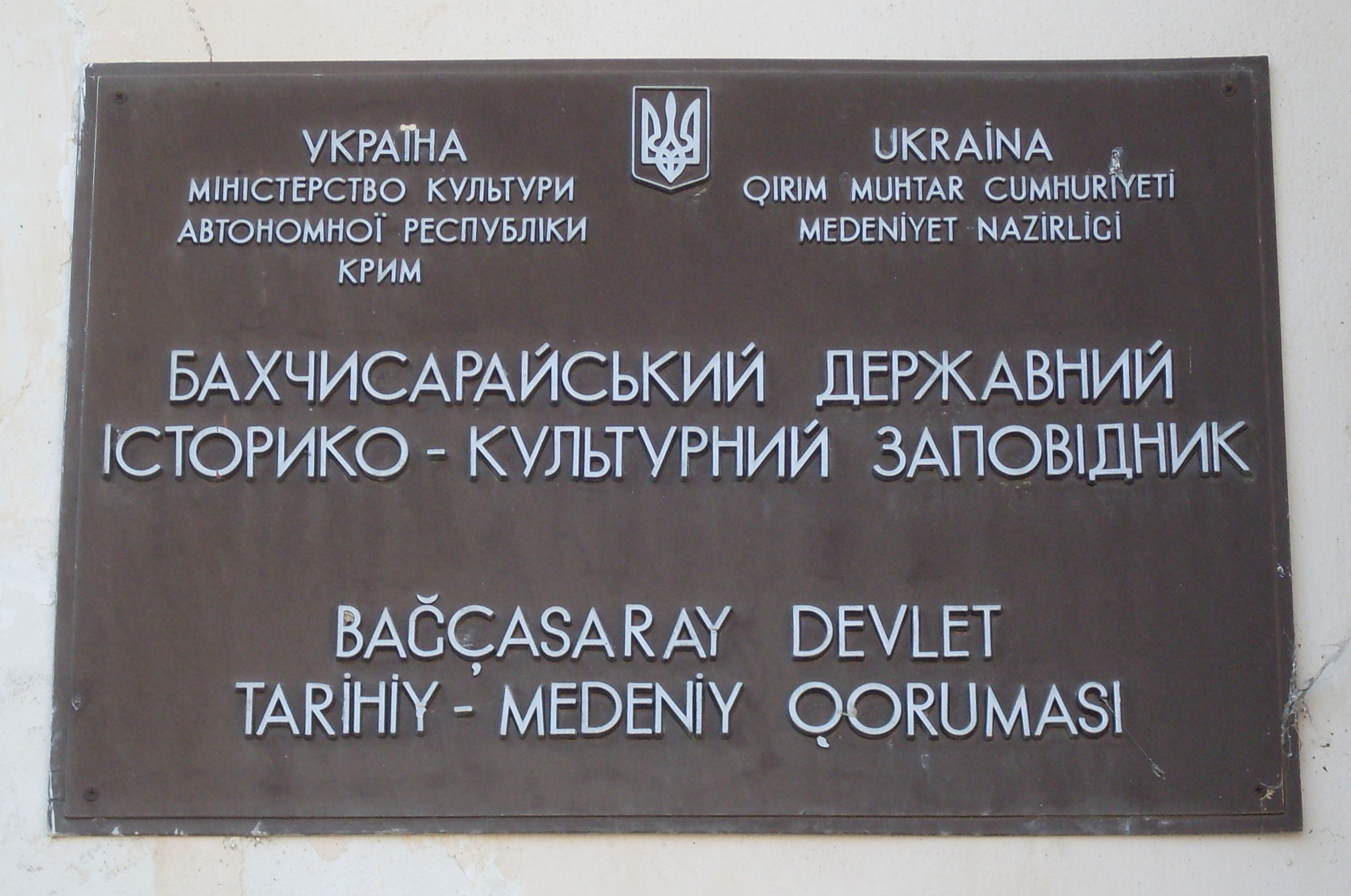
Crimean Tatar Latin script on a plate in Bakhchysarai in 2009, along with Ukrainian

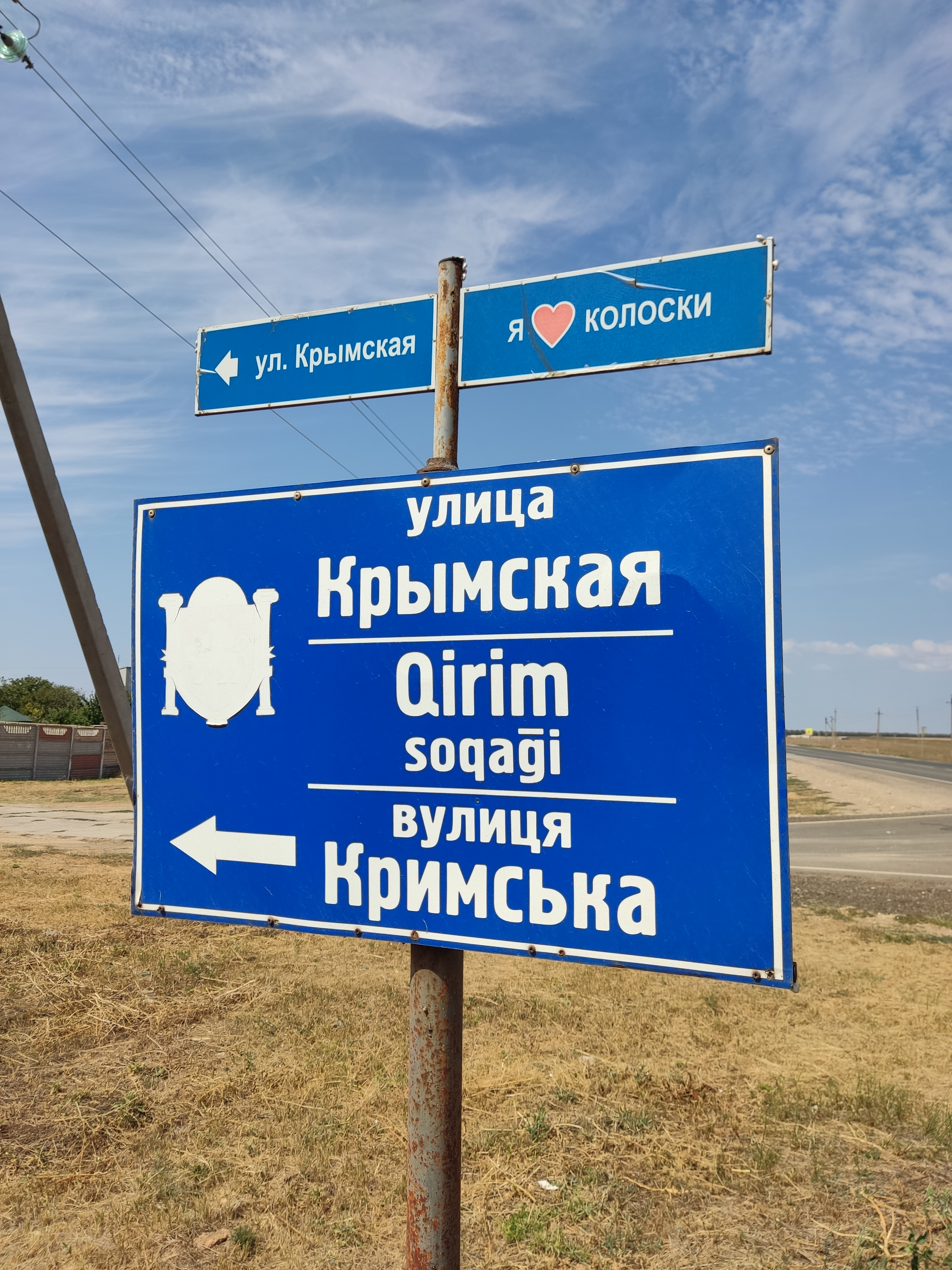
Crimean Tatar Latin script sign in Saky Raion in 2021, along with Russian and Ukrainian

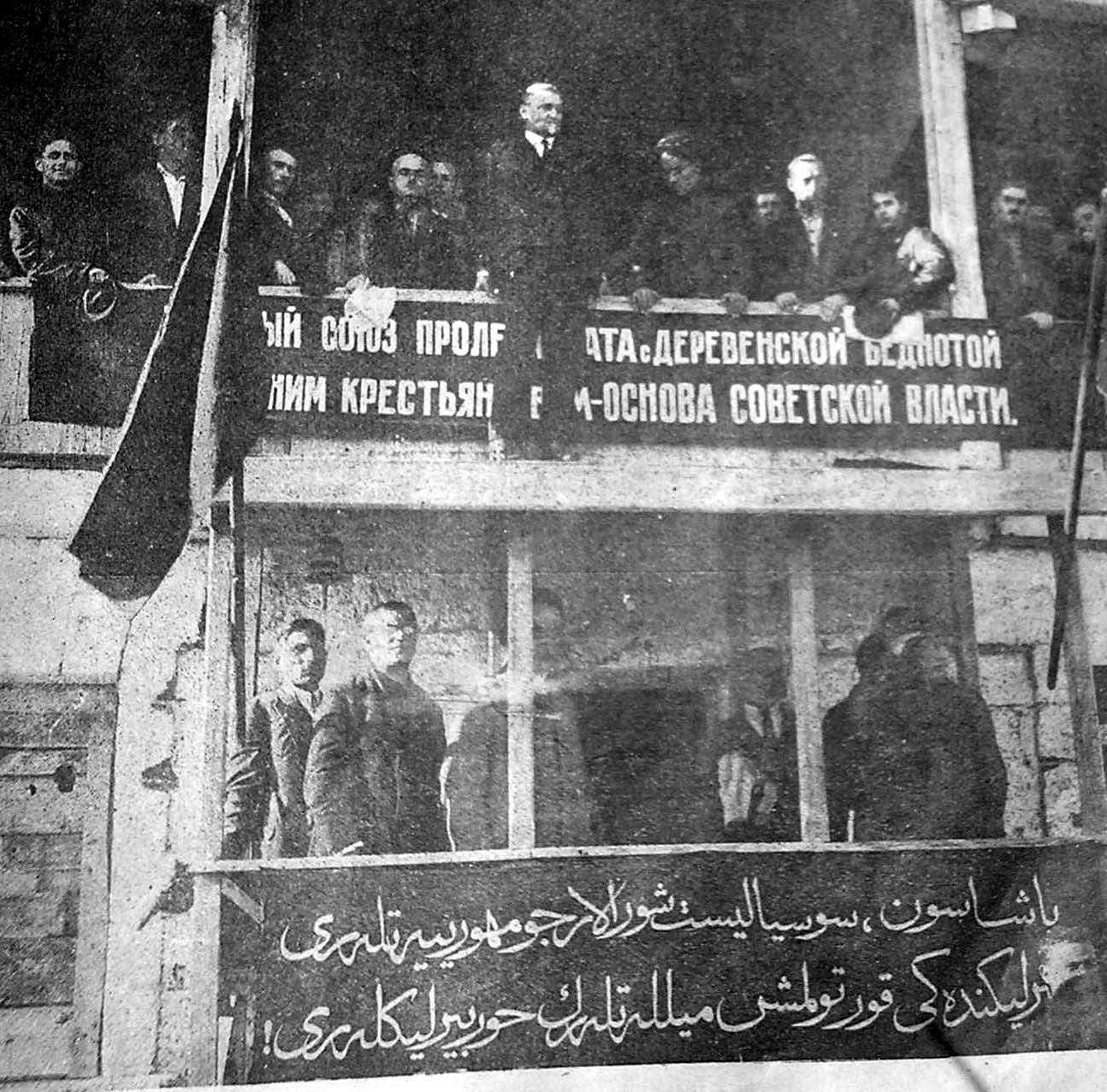
An example of Crimean Tatar Arabic script. The text reads in Modern Latin alphabet: "Yaşasın, Sotsialist Şuralar Cumhuriyetleri Birligindegi Qurtulış milletlerniñ hür birlikleri!" In Cyrillic: "Йашасын, Социалист Шуралар Джумхурийетлери Бирлигиндеги Къуртулыш миллетлернинъ хюр бирликлери!"

Crimean Tatar musician Negeadin Abit plays the song "Ay tek şatır", recorded in Romania.

Crimean Tatar (qırımtatar tili, къырымтатар тили, قریم تاتار تلی), also called Crimean (qırım tili, къырым тили, قریم تلی), is a Turkic language spoken in Crimea and the Crimean Tatar diasporas of Uzbekistan, Romania, Turkey and Bulgaria, as well as small communities in the United States and Canada. It should not be confused with Tatar, spoken in Tatarstan and adjacent regions in Russia; Crimean Tatar has been extensively influenced by nearby Oghuz languages and is mutually intelligible with them to varying degrees.

UNESCO ranks the Crimean Tatar language among the languages under serious threat of extinction (severely endangered). However, according to the Institute of Oriental Studies, due to negative situations, the real degree of the threat has elevated to critically endangered in recent years, which are highly likely to face extinction in the coming generations.

Crimean language is one of the official languages of the Autonomous Republic of Crimea (Ukraine), along with Ukrainian and Russian. It is also one of the state languages of the Republic of Crimea (Russian occupation, considered "temporarily occupied territories" by the Ukrainian government), the other ones being Ukrainian and Russian. In Romania, the Crimean Tatar language is officially recognised as a minority language.

== Number of speakers ==
Today, more than 260,000 Crimean Tatars live in Crimea. Approximately 120,000 reside in Central Asia (mainly in Uzbekistan), where their ancestors had been deported in 1944 during World War II by the Soviet Union. However, of all these people, mostly the older generations are the only ones still speaking Crimean Tatar. In 2013, the language was estimated to be on the brink of extinction, being taught in only around 15 schools in Crimea.

Turkey has contributed funds to enhancing and modernizing native-language education for Crimean Tatar youth within Ukraine. Turkey is home to an estimated 5 million people of Crimean Tatar descent, whose ancestors emigrated there during the 19th and early 20th centuries. Smaller Crimean Tatar communities—such as Dobrujan Tatars—are found in Romania (22,000) and Bulgaria (1,400).

Crimean Tatar is one of the most seriously endangered languages in Europe. Almost all Crimean Tatars are bilingual or multilingual, using the dominant languages of their respective home countries, such as Russian, Turkish, Romanian, Uzbek, Bulgarian or Ukrainian.

== Classification and dialects ==
The Crimean Tatar language consists of three dialects:

- Coastal or Southern dialect: spoken in the coastal regions of Crimea (Yalta, Alushta). Closely related to Turkish and genetically belongs to the Oghuz subgroup of Turkic languages.
- Orta (Middle or Central) dialect: spoken in the central regions of Crimea (Bakhchysarai, Karasubazar, Simferopol). Belongs to the Kipchak subgroup. Modern literary Crimean Tatar is based on the middle dialect.
- Steppe or Nogai dialect: spoken in the northern steppe regions of Crimea. Also belongs to the Kipchak subgroup.

=== Turkmen ===
There is a Turkmen variant spoken by the Turkmens (Turkoman), who are known as Tayfa/Dayfa in Crimea and Davulcu in Dobruja (their language is also known as Tayfaca [the language of Tayfa] or Davulcuca [the language of Davulcu]). They migrated once from Anatolia to Crimea, some of them settled to Dobruja at the end of 19th century with other Tatars.

The variant itself is seen as Oghuz with Kipchak continuum, but different from the Southern dialect of Crimean Tatar (which is a Kipchak variant with Oghuz continuum). TDK noticed some examples of the variant, as a part of Anatolian Turkish under the name "Kırım Türkmenleri" (Crimean Turkmens).

=== Romania and Bulgaria ===
There is also a variety of the Crimean Tatar language spoken in and near Romania (Dobrujan Tatar). It includes Crimean Tatar and Nogai dialects, but today there is no longer a sharp distinction between the dialects. (Note: Tatar language spoken in Romania today has resulted from the recent fusion of two dialects: the Northern Nogai spoken north of Constanta since the first part of the second millennium and the Southern Crimean, which was spoken south of the city to Bulgarian Dobruja, likely since the annexation of Crimea by the Russian Empire. Today there is no longer a sharp distinction between these dialects.) This language belongs to the Kipchak Turkic languages, specifically to the Kipchak-Nogai group.

==== Literary Tatar ====
Tatar spoken in Romania has two distinct facets existing, interweaving and forming together the literary Tatar language "edebiy Tatarğa". One of these aspects is the authentic Tatar called "ğalpî Tatarğa" or "ğalpak Tatarğa" and the other is the academic Tatar language called "muwallímatça".

- Academic Tatar language, means writing and pronouncing Arabic and Persian neologisms - occurring mostly in science, religion, literature, arts or politics - in their original form.
- Authentic Tatar language, means writing and pronouncing words, including those of Arabic and Persian origin, by strictly adapting them to the own phonetic system.

==== Dialects ====
The grammar book by University of Bucharest identifies the following dialects:

- Keríş
- Şoñgar
- Tat
- Ğemboylîk
- Ğedísan
- Ğetíşkul

Some sources define the dialects according to their level of influence by Oghuz languages.

1. The language with moderate Oghuz influence is spoken by about 70% of Tatars. It is spoken mainly in the south and center of Constanța.
2. The language with little Oghuz influence is spoken by about 20% Tatars. It is spoken in Tulcea, near and far north of Constanța, and is the most conservative in preserving Kipchak elements.
3. The language with high Oghuz influence is spoken by about 10% of Tatars. It is spoken around the city of Hacıoğlu Pazarcık (Dobrich) and is the closest to Oghuz languages.

== History ==
The formation period of the Crimean Tatar spoken dialects began with the first Turkic invasions of Crimea by Cumans and Pechenegs and ended during the period of the Crimean Khanate. However, the official written languages of the Crimean Khanate were Chagatai and Ottoman Turkish. After Islamization, Crimean Tatars wrote with an Arabic script.

In 1876, the different Turkic Crimean dialects were made into a uniform written language by Ismail Gasprinski. A preference was given to the Oghuz dialect of the Yalıboylus, in order to not break the link between the Crimeans and the Turks of the Ottoman Empire. In 1928, the language was reoriented to the middle dialect spoken by the majority of the people.

In 1928, the alphabet was replaced with the Uniform Turkic Alphabet based on the Latin script. The Uniform Turkic Alphabet was replaced in 1938 by a Cyrillic alphabet. During the 1990s and 2000s, the government of the Autonomous Republic of Crimea under Ukraine encouraged replacing the script with a Latin version again, but the Cyrillic has still been widely used (mainly in published literature, newspapers and education). The current Latin-based Crimean Tatar alphabet is the same as the Turkish alphabet, with two additional characters: Ñ ñ and Q q. In the Russian-annexed "Republic of Crimea" all official communications and education in Crimean Tatar are conducted exclusively in the Cyrillic alphabet.

As part of efforts by Soviet authorities to destroy Crimean Tatar identity, Crimean Tatar books were destroyed and education was banned in the language by Soviet authorities following the Sürgünlik. Similarly, following the Russian annexation of Crimea, access to education and media in Crimean Tatar has been suppressed by Russian authorities.

== Phonology ==
=== Vowels ===
| | Front | | Back | |
| | unrounded | rounded | unrounded | rounded |
|---|---|---|---|---|
| Close | i | y | ɯ | u |
| Mid/Open | e | ø | ɑ | o |

The vowel system of Crimean Tatar is similar to some other Turkic languages. Because high vowels in Crimean Tatar are short and reduced, /i/ and /ɯ/ are realized close to [ɪ], even though they are phonologically distinct.

=== Consonants ===
| | Labial | | Dental/ Alveolar | | Post- alveolar | | Velar | | Uvular |
|---|---|---|---|---|---|---|---|---|---|
| Nasal | | m | | n | | | | ŋ | |
| Stop | p | b | t | d | t͡ʃ | d͡ʒ | k | ɡ | q |
| Fricative | f | v | s | z | ʃ | | x | ɣ | |
| Trill | | | | r | | | | | |
| Approximants | | | | l | | j | | | |

In addition to these phonemes, Crimean also displays marginal phonemes that occur in borrowed words, especially palatalized consonants.

The southern (coastal) dialect substitutes /x/ for /q/, e.g. standard qara 'black', southern xara. At the same time the southern and some central dialects preserve glottal /h/ which is pronounced /x/ in the standard language. The northern dialect on the contrary lacks /x/ and /f/, substituting /q/ for /x/ and /p/ for /f/. The northern /v/ is usually [w], often in the place of /ɣ/, compare standard dağ and northern taw 'mountain' (also in other Oghuz and Kipchak languages, such as Azerbaijani: dağ and Kazakh: taw).

/k/ and /ɡ/ are usually fronted, close to [c] and [ɟ].

== Grammar ==
The grammar of Crimean Tatar, like all Turkic languages, is agglutinating, with the exclusive use of suffixing to express grammatical categories. Generally, suffixes are attached to the ends of word stems, although derivational morphology makes uses of compounding as well. Overall, the grammatical structure of the language is similar to that of other West Kipchak varieties. Crimean Tatar is a pro-drop language with a generally SOV word order.

=== Morphophonology ===
Crimean Tatar, like most Turkic languages, features pervasive vowel harmony, which results in sound changes when suffixes are added to verb or noun stems. Essentially, the vowel in a suffix undergoes assimilation to agree in certain categories with the vowel in the stem. The two main types of assimilation that characterize this agreement in Crimean Tatar morphophonology are backness harmony and rounding harmony.

Using the transliteration system in Kavitskaya (2010), non-high vowels undergoing backness harmony vary between [a] and [e], and are represented as A. High vowels that undergo both backness and rounding harmony alternate between [i], [y], [ɪ] and [u] and are represented as I. High vowels in suffixes that are never rounded and alternate between [i] and [ɪ] are represented as Y, whereas high vowels in suffixes that are always round and alternate between [u] and [y] are represented as U.

Some consonants undergo similar harmonizing changes depending on whether the preceding segment is voiced or voiceless, or whether the segment demonstrates backness harmony. Consonants that alternate between [k], [q], [g] and [ɣ] are represented as K, alternating [k] and [g] as G, alternating [t] and [d] by D, and alternating [tʃ] and [dʒ] as Ç.

Thus, the suffix -şAr could be rendered as "şar" or "şer" depending on the vowel in the morpheme preceding it.

=== Verbs ===
Crimean Tatar verbal morphology is fairly complex, inflecting for tense, number, person, aspect, mood and voice. Verbs are conjugated according to the following paradigm:

[STEM] + [reflexive] + [causative] + [passive] + [negation] + [tense/aspect/mood] + [person/number]

It is possible, albeit rare, for a single verb to contain all of these possible components, as in:

Мен ювундырылмадым.
Men yuvundırılmadım.
I wash-REFL-CAUS-PASS-NEG-PAST-1SG
"I was not forced to wash myself."

For the most part, each type of suffix would only appear once in any given word, although it is possible in some circumstances for causative suffixes to double up.

Infinitive verbs take the -mAK suffix and can be negated by the addition of the suffix -mA between the verb stem and the infinitive suffix, creating verb constructions that do not easily mirror English.

яшамакъ
yaşamaq
"to live"

яшамамакъ
yaşamamaq
"not to live"

Verb derivation

Novel verb stems are derived chiefly by applying a verbalizing suffix to a noun or adjective, as demonstrated in the following examples:

тишле
tişle
tooth-VB
"bite"

къарар
qarar
black-VB
"become black"

кечик
keçik
late-VB
"be late"

Bare verb stems can also be compounded with noun stems to create new verbs, as in:

чекеле
çekele
pull-carry-VB
"to overhaul"

Person markers

There are two types of person markers for finite verbs, pronominal and possessive. Depending on tense and mood, verbs will take one or the other set of endings.

Pronominal
| | Singular | Plural |
|---|---|---|
| 1st Person | -(I)m | -mIz |
| 2nd Person | -sIñ | -sI(ñI)z |
| 3rd Person | -∅ | (-lAr) |

Possessive
| | Singular | Plural |
|---|---|---|
| 1st Person | -m | -K |
| 2nd Person | -ñ | -ñIz |
| 3rd Person | -∅ | (-lAr) |

Grammatical person is not marked in third person singular, and the marker is optional in third person plural. As shown above, these markers come as the last element in the broader verb complex.

Tense and aspect markers

Grammatical tense and aspect are expressed in combination by the addition of various markers to the verb stem. Some of these markers match with pronominal person markers, while others take possessive person markers. Each tense/aspect has an associated negation marker; most of these are -mA but there is some variation.

| | Marker | Negation | Person Marker | Example |
|---|---|---|---|---|
| General Present | -A/y (Note: The former is used for consonant-final endings, the latter for vowel-final.) | -mA | pronominal | alam ("I take") |
| Progressive Present | -mAKtA | -mA | pronominal | yazmaqtamız ("We are writing.") |
| Future/Present | -Ar/(I)r | -mAz | pronominal | bağırırım ("I will yell.") |
| Categorical Future | -AcAK/ycAK | -mA | pronominal | alacağım ("I will [probably] take") |
| General Past | -DY | -mA | possessive | Qırımğa keldik ("We returned to Crimea.") |
| Evidential Past | -KAn | -mA | pronominal | bergenler ("they [apparently] gave") |
| Conditional | -sA | -mA | possessive | alsam ("if I take") |

A separate set of compound tenses are formed by adding the past tense copula edi- to the derived forms listed above.

| | Formed With | Negation | Example |
|---|---|---|---|
| Habitual Past | Future/Present | -mAz | alır edim ("I often used to take") |
| Compound Past | General Present | -mA | ala edik ("we were taking") |
| Pluperfect | Evidential Past | -mA | alğan edim ("I had taken") |
| Counterfactual Past | Categorical Future | -mA | yazacaq edim ("I would have written") |
| Progressive Past | Progressive Present | -mA | Ketmekte edim. ("I kept going.") |
| Past Conditional | Conditional | -mA | alsa edim ("if I had taken") |

Mood

The imperative is formed using a specific set of person markers, and negated using -mA. In second person imperatives, only the bare verb stem is used. A first person imperative expresses an "I/we should do X" sentiment, whereas third person expresses "let him/her do X," as shown below with unut ("to forget"):

| | Singular | Plural |
|---|---|---|
| 1st Person | -(A)yIm | -(A)yIK |
| 2nd Person | Ø | -IñIz |
| 3rd Person | -sIn | -sInlAr |

Унутайым.
Unutayım
"I should have to forget."

Унут!
Unut!
"Forget!"

Унутсын.
Unutsın.
"Let him/her forget."

Other moods are constructed similarly to tense/aspect forms.

| | Marker | Negation | Person Marker | Example |
|---|---|---|---|---|
| Optative | -KAy(dI) | -mAy | pronominal | Aytqaydım ("I wish I had spoken.") |
| Obligative | -mAlY | -mA | possessive | Aytmalım ("I have to speak.") |

Voice

Grammatical voice is expressed by the addition of suffixes which come in sequence before negation, tense, aspect, mood and person markers. There are several causative suffixes which vary depending on the ending of the verb stem.

Voice
| | Marker | Example |
|---|---|---|
| Passive | -(I)l | aşal ("to be eaten") |
| Reflexive | -(I)n | yuvun ("to bathe oneself") |
| Reciprocal | -(I)ş | tapış ("to find each other") |

Causative
| Marker | Added To | Example |
|---|---|---|
| -t | polysyllabic stems ending in vowel | işlet ("force to work") |
| -It | stems ending in -rk, -lk, -k | qorqut ("to scare [someone]") |
| -Ir | monosyllabic stems ending in -t, -ç, -ş | uçur ("allow to fly away") |
| -Ar | monosyllabic stems | qopar ("break off [something]") |
| -DIrm | most remaining stems | töktür ("force to spill") |

Participles

Past, future and present participles are formed by the addition of suffixes and are negated in the same way as other verbs.

| | Marker | Negation |
|---|---|---|
| Past | -KAn | -mA |
| Future | -cAK | -mAy |
| Present | -r | -mAz |

язылгъан мектюп
yazılğan mektüp
write-PTCP.PAST letter
"written letter"

сынаджакъ араба
sınacaq araba
break-PTCP.FUT cart
"cart that will break"

янар дагъ
yanar dağ
burn-PTCP.PRES mountain
"burning mountain"

Copula

The copula ol ("to be, become, exist") is generally expressed as a predicate suffix in the present tense, closely resembling the pronominal person endings, as displayed below. The third person endings are frequently deleted in colloquial speech. The copula's past tense form, edi, is suppletive. Future tense copular forms are constructed by the addition of the categorical future suffix -cAK.

| | Singular | Plural |
|---|---|---|
| 1st Person | -(I)m | -mIz |
| 2nd Person | -sIñ | -sI(ñI)z |
| 3rd Perso | (-dır) | (-dır) |

Мен оджам.
Men ocam.
I teacher-COP.1SG
"I am a teacher."

Мен оджа эдим.
Men oca edim.
I teacher COP.PAST.1SG
"I was a teacher."

Мен оджа oладжагъым.
Men oca olacağım.
I teacher COP.FUT.1SG
"I will be a teacher."

Converbs

Converbs, a characteristic of many Turkic languages, express sequential or dependent action. Present tense converbs are formed by the addition of the suffixes -A (used after consonants) and -y (used after vowels). In past tense, converbs take the suffix -Ip. Thus:

Acaн эвгe кeлип эвни темизледи.
Asan evge kelip evni temizledi.
Asan house-DAT come-CVB.PAST house-ACC clean-VB-PAST
"Asan came home and cleaned the house."

=== Nouns ===
Crimean Tatar noun stems take suffixes which express grammatical number, case and possession. As in all other Turkic languages, there is no grammatical gender in Crimean Tatar. Nouns are declined according to the following paradigm:

[STEM] + [number] + [possession] + [case]

Noun derivation

Noun stems are derived in a number of ways. Most commonly, a bare noun stem can take a denominal suffix which alters its basic meaning. Similarly, a bare verb stem can take a deverbal suffix that converts it into a noun. There are many such denominal and deverbal suffixes in Crimean Tatar; some common suffixes are shown below:

Denominal
| Marker | Meaning | Example | Gloss |
|---|---|---|---|
| -dAş | belonging to group | yaşdaş ("of same age") | age-SUF |
| -kir | association/inclination | işkir ("hard worker") | work-SUF |
| -lIK | abstraction | dostluq ("friendship") | friend-SUF |
| -şınas | performer of act | tilşınas ("linguist") | tongue-SUF |
| -ÇI | performer of act | lisaniyatçı ("linguist") | linguistics-SUF |
| -çYK | diminutive | buzçıq ("piece of ice") | ice-SUF |

Deverbal
| Marker | Meaning | Example | Gloss |
|---|---|---|---|
| -mA | result of action | aşıqma ("a hurry") | hurry-SUF |
| -KI | instrument of action | bilgi ("knowledge") | know-SUF |
| -KIç | utility of action | tutquç ("holder, handle") | hold-SUF |
| -I | general noun formation | ölü ("dead man") | die-SUF |
| -(I)k | general noun formation | kürek ("shovel") | scoop-SUF |
| -(U)v | general noun formation | quruv ("building") | build-SUF |

Noun stems can also be reduplicated, which lends a more generalized meaning. The last method of noun derivation is through the compounding of two noun stems. Thus:

къартоп-мaртоп
qartop-martop
potato-REDUP
"potatoes and the like"

aнa-бaбa
ana-baba
mother-father
"parents"

Number

Nouns are pluralized by the addition of the suffix -lAr to the noun stem. The vowel in this plural suffix agrees phonetically with the final vowel in the stem.

aрaбалар
arabalar
car-PL
"cars"

Use of the plural can also express respect, as in:

Oсмановлар кельди.
Osmanovlar keldi.
"Osmanov came."

Possession

Possession is expressed through person-specific suffixing. As with the plural suffix, possession suffixes harmonize with the preceding vowel in regular ways.

| | Singular | Plural |
|---|---|---|
| 1st Person | -(I)m | -(I)mIz |
| 2nd Person | -(I)ñ | -(I)ñIz |
| 3rd Person | -(s)I | -(lar)-(s)I |

балам
balam
child-1SG.POSS-NOM
"my child"

баланъ
balañ
child-2SG.POSS-NOM
"your child"

баласы
balası
child-3SG.POSS-NOM
"his/her child"

Case

Crimean Tatar has six grammatical cases. The nominative case is unmarked, and the remaining cases are expressed through suffixing. These suffixes come last in a fully declined noun.

| | Suffix | Example with bala ("child") |
|---|---|---|
| Nominative | ∅ | bala ("the child" [subject]) |
| Accusative | -nY | balanı ("the child" [direct object]) |
| Genitive | -nYñ | balanıñ ("of the child") |
| Dative | -KA | balağa ("to the child") |
| Locative | -DA | balada ("at the child") |
| Ablative | -DAn | baladan ("away from the child") |

=== Pronouns ===
Like nouns, pronouns are inflected for number, person and case but not for gender.

| | Singular | | | Plural | | |
| | 1st | 2nd | 3rd | 1st | 2nd | 3rd |
|---|---|---|---|---|---|---|
| Nominative | men | sen | o | biz | siz | olar |
| Accusative | meni | seni | onı | bizni | sizni | olarnı |
| Genitive | menim | seniñ | onıñ | bizim | siziñ | olarnıñ |
| Dative | maña | saña | oña | bizge | sizge | olarǧa |
| Locative | mende | sende | onda | bizde | sizde | olarda |
| Ablative | menden | senden | ondan | bizden | sizden | olardan |

The second person plural pronoun can be used to denote formality or respect, even if its referent is a single person.

There are two roots, öz- and kendi-, that express reflexivity. Of the two, kendi- is more common in the southern dialect, but both are used throughout the entire area in which Crimean Tatar is spoken.

Possessive pronouns are formed by adding the suffix -ki to the genitive form of a personal pronoun, as in:

| | Singular | Plural |
|---|---|---|
| 1st Person | menimki | bizimki |
| 2nd Person | seniñki | siziñki |
| 3rd Person | onıñki | olarnıñki |

=== Adjectives ===
Adjectives in Crimean Tatar precede the nouns they modify. They do not show agreement, and as such do not take any of the case, person or possession suffixes.

Adjectives can be derived by the addition of certain suffixes to a noun or verb stem.

кескин
keskin
cut-SUF
"sharp"

куньдеки
kündeki
day-SUF
"daily"

Къырымлы
Qırımlı
Crimea-SUF
"Crimean"

The comparative and superlative forms of adjectives are expressed, respectively, by the suffix -ÇA and the particle eñ, as in the following examples:

узунджур
uzuncur
"hotter"

энъ балабан
eñ balaban
"biggest"

An idiomatic superlative form using episi ("all") in the ablative case is also possible.

О эписинден татлы бакълава пишире.
O episinden tatlı baqlava pişire.
she all-POSS-ABL sweet baklava boil-CAUS-PRES
"She cooks the sweetest baklava."

=== Numerals ===
Crimean Tatar uses a standard decimal system with individual lexical terms for cardinal numbers 0-10, multiples of 10 up to 100, and large numbers, where Crimean follows the long scale system. Other numerals are formed by combining numerals without inflection, such as 15 'on beş' (lit. ten five) or 287 'eki jüz seksen jedi' (lit. two hundred eighty seven).

For inflection of numerals, suffixes are added only to the rightmost member of the complex number. Inflection of numerals does not differ from that of nouns. Inflection within a complex numeral is used to form fractions with cardinal numbers, with the denominator first in ablative case and numerator second in the case required by the sentence, e.g. 2/3 'üçten eki'.

Non-Derived Numerals
| | Cardinal | Ordinal |
|---|---|---|
| 0 | sıfır | sıfırıncı |
| 1 | bir | birinci |
| 2 | eki | ekinci |
| 3 | üç | üçünci |
| 4 | dört | dörtünci |
| 5 | beş | beşinci |
| 6 | altı | altıncı |
| 7 | yedi | yedinci |
| 8 | sekiz | sekizinci |
| 9 | doquz | doquzuncı |
| 10 | on | onuncı |
| 20 | yigirmi | yigirminci |
| 30 | otuz | otuzuncı |
| 40 | qırq | qırqıncı |
| 50 | elli | ellinci |
| 60 | altmış | altmışıncı |
| 70 | yetmiş | yetmişinci |
| 80 | seksen | sekseninci |
| 90 | doqsan | doqsanıncı |
| 100 | yüz | yüzünci |
| 1000 | biñ | biñinci |
| 10^{6} | million | millionıncı |
| 10^{9} | milliard | milliardıncı |
| 10^{12} | trillion | trillionıncı |

Numeral Types
| | Suffix | Example |
|---|---|---|
| Ordinal | -(I)ncY | on birinci ("eleventh") |
| Distributive | -(ş)Ar | ekişer ("two each") |
| Approximative | -lAr | onlar ("tens", "around ten") |

=== Postpositions ===
Crimean Tatar uses postpositions. Each postposition governs a specific case, either dative, genitive or ablative. Some common postpositions are shown below:

| Postposition | English | Case' |
|---|---|---|
| qadar | until | DAT |
| taba | towards | DAT |
| zarfında | during | GEN |
| ile | with | GEN |
| içün | for | GEN |
| soñ | after | ABL |
| sebep | due to | ABL |

== Writing systems ==
Crimean Tatar is written in either the Cyrillic or Latin alphabets, both modified to the specific needs of Crimean Tatar, and either used respective to where the language is used.

Historically, the Arabic script was used from the sixteenth century. In the Soviet Union, it was replaced by a Latin alphabet based on Yañalif in 1928, and by a Cyrillic alphabet in 1938.

After Russia's annexation of Crimea in 2014, Cyrillic became the sole script allowed in Russian occupied Crimea because according to the Constitutional Court of Russia decision made in 2004, all languages of Russia must use Cyrillic. However there are some contradictions to the decision: virtually all Finnic languages, including distantly-related Skolt Sámi, spoken in Russia, currently use the Latin script as their sister languages Finnish and Estonian do, despite the historical existence of Karelian Cyrillic alphabet.

In 1992, a Latin alphabet based on Common Turkic Alphabet was adopted by the decision of the Qurultay of the Crimean Tatar People, which was formally supported by the Supreme Council of Crimea in 1997 but never implemented officially on practical level. However, in 2021, the Ministry of Reintegration of Temporarily Occupied Territories of Ukraine has announced it begins the implementation of the decision, with vice premier Oleksii Reznikov supporting the transition by stating that Latin corresponds better to Turkic phonetics. The ministry revealed it plans to finish the transition to Latin by 2025, which was supported by the Mejlis of the Crimean Tatar People. The alphabet is co-developed by A. Yu. Krymskyi Institute of Oriental Studies, Potebnia Institute of Linguistics, Institute of Philology of Taras Shevchenko National University of Kyiv and Tavrida National V.I. Vernadsky University.

The Crimean Tatar language in Romania did get a Latin alphabet in 1956, it was established as a section in University of Bucharest the Faculty of Foreign Languages and Literatures in 1957 and also in 1977 it was disbanded. Most of the teachers who taught at the Tatar language department graduated from the Faculty of History and Philology of Kazan State University (located in Tatarstan, Russia), specializing in Tatar language and literature. In the communist period, Tatar books were brought from the USSR to teach the Tatar language in Romania, but it failed. Nowadays the Tatar language is taught in some Romanian schools using their own Tatar language books.

=== Arabic alphabet ===
Crimean Tatars used Arabic script from the 16th century to 1928.

| Contextual forms | | | | Name | Modern Latin form |
| Isolated | Final | Medial | Initial | Name | Modern Latin form |
|---|---|---|---|---|---|
| ﺍ | ﺎ | — | | elif | a, â |
| ﺀ | — | | | hemze | - |
| ﺏ | ﺐ | ﺒ | ﺑ | be | b, p (word-ending) |
| ﭖ | ﭗ | ﭙ | ﭘ | pe | p |
| ﺕ | ﺖ | ﺘ | ﺗ | te | t |
| ﺙ | ﺚ | ﺜ | ﺛ | se | s |
| ﺝ | ﺞ | ﺠ | ﺟ | cim | c |
| ﭺ | ﭻ | ﭽ | ﭼ | çim | ç |
| ﺡ | ﺢ | ﺤ | ﺣ | ha | - |
| ﺥ | ﺦ | ﺨ | ﺧ | hı | h |
| ﺩ | ﺪ | — | | dal | d |
| ﺫ | ﺬ | — | | zel | z |
| ﺭ | ﺮ | — | | re | r |
| ﺯ | ﺰ | — | | ze | z |
| ﮊ | ﮋ | — | | je | j |
| ﺱ | ﺲ | ﺴ | ﺳ | sin | s |
| ﺵ | ﺶ | ﺸ | ﺷ | şin | ş |
| ﺹ | ﺺ | ﺼ | ﺻ | sad | s |
| ﺽ | ﺾ | ﻀ | ﺿ | dad | d, z |
| ﻁ | ﻂ | ﻄ | ﻃ | tı | t |
| ﻅ | ﻆ | ﻈ | ﻇ | zı | z |
| ﻉ | ﻊ | ﻌ | ﻋ | ayn | - |
| ﻍ | ﻎ | ﻐ | ﻏ | ğayn | ğ |
| ﻑ | ﻒ | ﻔ | ﻓ | fe | f |
| ﻕ | ﻖ | ﻘ | ﻗ | qaf | q |
| ﻙ | ﻚ | ﻜ | ﻛ | kef (kef-i arabiy) | k (g, ñ) ^{1} |
| ﮒ | ﮓ | ﮕ | ﮔ | gef (kef-i farsiy) | g |
| ﯓ | ﯔ | ﯖ | ﯕ | nef (kef-i nuniy, sağır kef) | ñ |
| ﻝ | ﻞ | ﻠ | ﻟ | lâm | l |
| ﻡ | ﻢ | ﻤ | ﻣ | mim | m |
| ﻥ | ﻦ | ﻨ | ﻧ | nun | n |
| ﻭ | ﻮ | — | | vav | v, o, ö, u, ü |
| ﻩ | ﻪ | ﻬ | ﻫ | he | -, e, a |
| ﻻ | ﻼ | — | | lâm-elif | la, lâ |
| ﻯ | ﻰ | ﻴ | ﻳ | ye | y, ı, i |

Note:

1. The letter ﻙ (kef) is often used in place of ﮒ and ﯓ.

=== Latin alphabet ===
Â â is not considered to be a separate letter. Usually it represents the near-open front unrounded vowel, /æ/.

| a | b | c | ç | d | e | f | g | ğ | h | ı | i (ĭ) | j | k | l | m | n | ñ | o | ö | p | q | r | s | ş | t | u | ü | v (w) | y | z |
| [a] | [b] | [dʒ] | [tʃ] | [d] | [e] | [f] | [ɡ] | [ɣ] | [x] | [ɯ] | [i], [ɪ] | [ʒ] | [k] | [l] | [m] | [n] | [ŋ] | [o] | [ø] | [p] | [q] | [r] | [s] | [ʃ] | [t] | [u] | [y] | [v], [w] | [j] | [z] |

=== Latin alphabet in Romania ===
In Romania, the Crimean Tatar language uses a different orthography. There is a total of 10 letters used to represent determinant sounds of which 9 mark authentic determinant sounds: a, e, i, î, í, o, ó, u, ú while the letter á is used for an academic vowel. The writing system registers authentic consonants with 17 letters: b, ç, d, g, ğ, j, k, l, m, n, ñ, p, r, s, ş, t, z and has three signs standing for the academic consonants: f, h, v. There are also two authentic semivowels: y, w. An old authentic Turkic consonant, the sound /ç/ represented by the letter ⟨Ç⟩ is rarely heard because authentic speakers of Tatar spoken in Dobruja spell it /ş/ as letter ⟨Ş⟩. As the written language most often follows the spoken language shifting ⟨Ç⟩ to ⟨Ş⟩, the result is that in Tatar spoken in Romania letter ⟨Ç⟩ and sound /ç/ are often treated as academic.

=== Cyrillic alphabet ===
| а | б | в | г | гъ | д | е | ё | ж | з | и | й | к | къ | л | м | н | нъ | о | п | р | с | т | у | ф | х | ц | ч | дж | ш | щ | ъ | ы | ь | э | ю | я |
| [a] | [b] | [v], [w] | [ɡ] | [ɣ] | [d] | [ɛ], [jɛ] | [ø], [jø], [jo], [ʲo] | [ʒ] | [z] | [i], [ɪ] | [j] | [k] | [q] | [l], [ɫ] | [m] | [n] | [ŋ] | [o], [ø] | [p] | [r] | [s] | [t] | [u], [y] | [f] | [x] | [ts] | [tʃ] | [dʒ] | [ʃ] | [ʃtʃ] | [(.j)] | [ɯ] | [ʲ] | [ɛ] | [y], [jy], [ju], [ʲu] | [ʲa], [ja] |

The digraphs гъ, къ, нъ and дж are separate letters.

== Sample text ==
Article 1 of the Universal Declaration of Human Rights in Crimean Tatar Latin alphabet:

Bütün insanlar serbestlik, menlik ve uquqlarda musaviy olıp dünyağa keleler. Olar aqıl ve vicdan saibidirler ve biri-birilerinen qardaşçasına munasebette bulunmalıdırlar.

Article 1 of the Universal Declaration of Human Rights in English:

All human beings are born free and equal in dignity and rights. They are endowed with reason and conscience and should act towards one another in a spirit of brotherhood.

== Legal status ==
The Crimean peninsula is internationally recognized as territory of Ukraine, but since the 2014 Russian annexation of Crimea is de facto administered as part of the Russian Federation.

According to Russian law, by the April 2014 constitution of the Republic of Crimea and the 2017 Crimean language law, the Crimean Tatar language is a state language in Crimea alongside Russian and Ukrainian, while Russian is the state language of the Russian Federation, the language of interethnic communication, and required in public postings in the conduct of elections and referendums.

In Ukrainian law, according to the constitution of the Autonomous Republic of Crimea, as published in Russian by its Verkhovna Rada, Russian and Crimean Tatar languages enjoy a "protected" (Russian: обеспечивается ... защита) status; every citizen is entitled, at his request (ходатайство), to receive government documents, such as "passport, birth certificate and others" in Crimean Tatar; but Russian is the language of interethnic communication and to be used in public life. According to the constitution of Ukraine, Ukrainian is the state language. Recognition of Russian and Crimean Tatar was a matter of political and legal debate.

Before the Sürgünlik, the 18 May 1944 deportation by the Soviet Union of Crimean Tatars to internal exile in Uzbek SSR, Crimean Tatar had an official language status in the Crimean Autonomous Soviet Socialist Republic.

Crimean Tatars are an officially recognized minority community in Romania. The Fifth of May is the official Tatar Language Day in Romania.

== Media ==
The first Crimean Tatar newspaper was Terciman published in 1883-1918 by Ismail Gasprinsky. Some other Crimean Tatar media include: ATR, Qırım Aqiqat, Qırım, Meydan, Qırım Alemi, Avdet, Yañı Dünya, Yıldız.

There are some Tatar magazines in Romania, as well as novels, dictionaries, poetry books, school books and science books. Some of the dictionaries are printed by the help of UDTTMR. Tatar learning rubrics called "Tatarşa üyrenemĭz" (Romanian: Învățăm tătărește; "We learn Tatar") and the TV show "Romanya'dan Tatarlar" (Romanian: Tătarii din România; "Tatars from Romania") were also broadcast on Romanian television. However, this version of the language is not supported in language keyboards or in machine translation. But there is a project trying to collect text data for Crimean Tatar (Romania). The project is titled as Crimean Tatar (Romania) Language Corpus, "this focuses on collecting text sources specifically for the Dobrujan Tatar dialect, adhering to a particular orthography and linguistic norm established by Taner Murat and the Tatar language section of the Faculty of Foreign Languages and Literatures at the University of Bucharest."

== Bibliography ==
- Berta, Árpád (1998). "West Kipchak Languages". In Johanson, Lars; Csató, Éva Ágnes (eds.). The Turkic Languages. Routledge. pp. 301–317. ISBN 978-0-415-08200-6.
- Johanson, Lars (1995). "On Turkic Converb Clauses". In Haspelmath, Martin; König, Ekkehard (eds.). Converbs in Cross-Linguistic Perspective. Berlin: Mouton de Gruyter. pp. 313–347.
- Kavitskaya, Darya (2010). Crimean Tatar. Munich: Lincom Europa.
- Изидинова, С. Р. (1997). "Крымскотатарский язык" [Crimean Tatar language]. Языки мира. Тюркские языки [Languages of the world. Turkic languages] (in Russian).
