= Ismail Gasprinsky =

Crimean Tatar intellectual, educator, publisher, and politician

Ismail Gasprinski
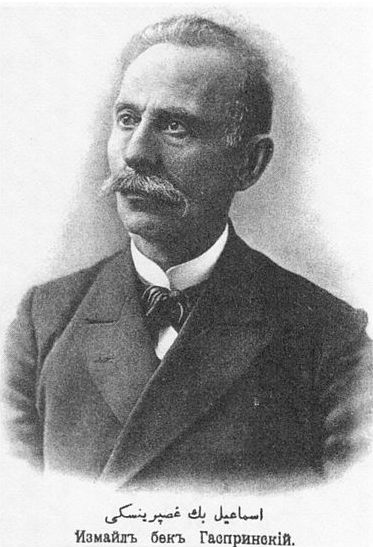
- Born: 20 March [O.S. 8 March] 1851; Ulu-Sala, Yaltinsky Uyezd, Taurida Governorate, Russian Empire (now Synapne, Bakhchysarai Raion, AR Crimea, Ukraine)
- Died: 24 September [O.S. 11 September] 1914 (aged 63)
- Occupations: intellectual, educator, publisher and politician

Ismail bey Gasprinsky (also written as Gaspirali and Gasprinski; Crimean Tatar: اسماعیل بك غصپرالى, İsmail bey Gaspıralı; Russian: Исмаи́л Гаспри́нский Ismail Gasprinskii; 20 March [O.S. 8 March] 1851 – 24 September [O.S. 11 September] 1914) was a Crimean Tatar intellectual, educator, publisher and Pan-Turkist politician who inspired the Jadidist movement in Central Asia. He was one of the first Muslim intellectuals in the Russian Empire, who realized the need for education and cultural reform and modernization of the Turkic and Islamic communities. His last name comes from the town of Gaspra in Crimea.

== Biography ==
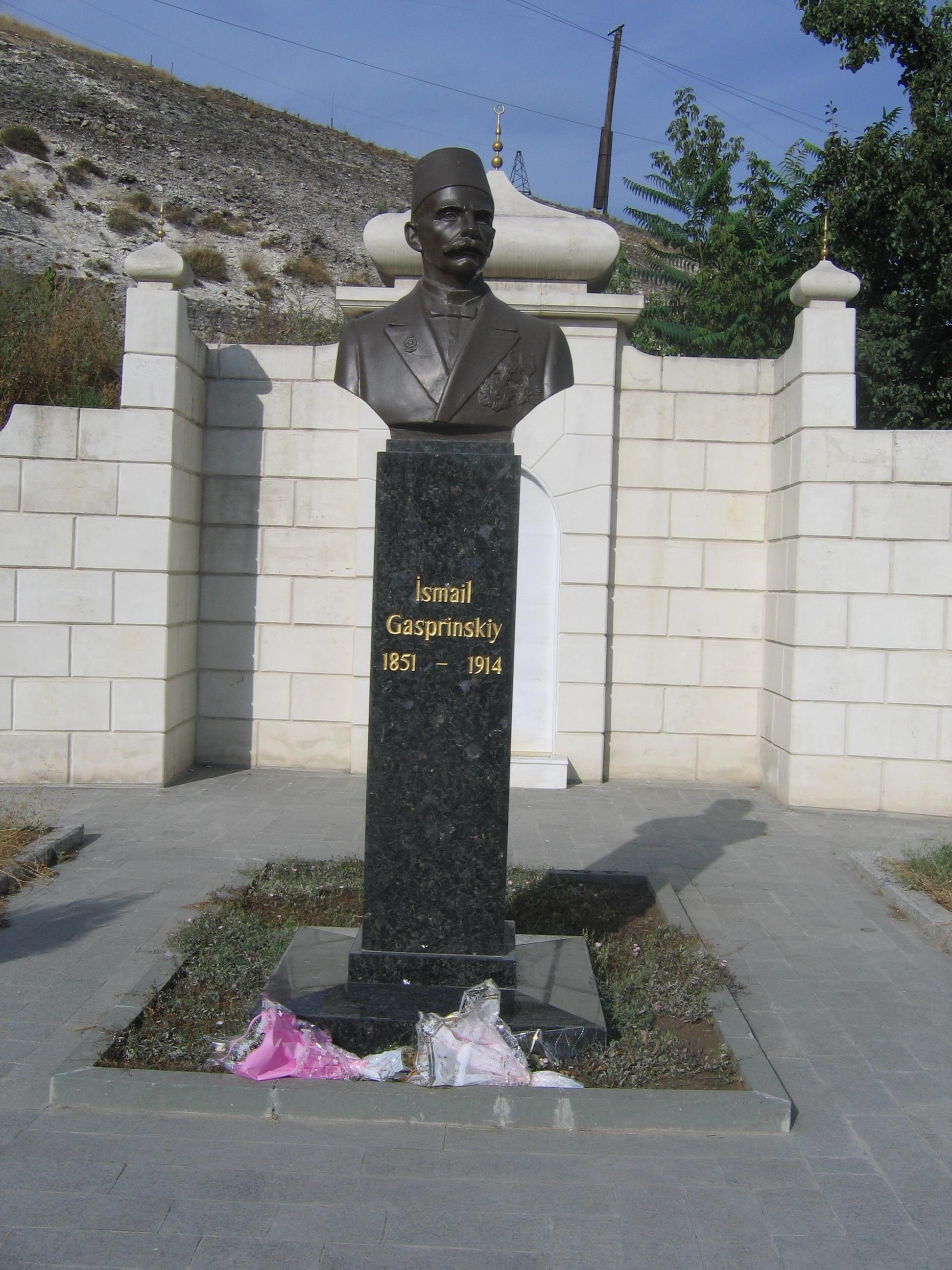
Gasprinski monument in Bakhchisaray.

Ismail communicated his ideas mainly through the newspaper Terciman he founded in 1883, which existed till 1918. In his publications he called for unity and solidarity among the Turkic peoples and advocated their modernization through Europeanization. Ismail believed that the only way for modernization was through education. He widely advocated for the introduction of an education reform, and criticized the traditional education system in Muslim schools focusing much on religion and devised a new method of teaching children how to read effectively in their mother tongue and introduced curricular reforms.

He supported the creation of a common literary language and therefore developed a "pan-Turkic" language, a simplified form of Turkish omitting words imported from Arabic and Persian, which was intended to be understood by "the boatman of the Bosphorus and by the camel driver of Kashgar." The Tercümen had subscribers in the Caucasus, amongst Muslims in the Russian Empire, Egypt and Iran.

In his 1881 book Russian Muslims he wrote:

"Our ignorance is the main reason for our backward condition. We have no access at all to what has been discovered and to what is going on in Europe. We must be able to read in order to overcome our isolation; we must learn European ideas from European sources. We must introduce into our primary and secondary schools subjects that will permit our pupils to have such access".

Ismail also initiated a new journal for women, Alem-i Nisvan (Women's World), edited by his daughter Şefiqa, as well as a publication for children, Alem-i Subyan (World of Children). Ismail was one of the founders of Union of Muslims (İttifaq-i Müslimin), created in Saint Petersburg in January 1906 and uniting members of intelligentsia from various Muslim Turkic peoples of the Russian Empire. He was also one of the main organizers of the first All-Russian Muslim congresses, aimed at introducing social and religious reforms among the Muslim peoples of Russia.

He inspired the movement known as Jadidism. In 1912, Gasprinski visited British India.

== Legacy ==
Ismail Gasprinskyi street exists in Kyiv.

== Awards ==
- Order of the Medjidie, 4th Class (Ottoman Empire)
- Order of the Lion and the Sun, 3rd and 4th Class (Persia)
- Order of the Noble Bukhara in Gold, 3rd Class (Bukhara Emirate)
- Medal of the Russian Technical Society of St. Petersburg in Bronze

== See also ==
- Crimean Tatars
- List of Crimean Tatars
- Jadids
- Şefiqa Gaspıralı

== Sources ==
- Kirimli, H. (1993). The "Young Tatar" Movement in the Crimea, 1905-1909. Cahiers Du Monde Russe Et Soviétique, 34(4), 529-560.
- Kuttner, Thomas (1975). "Russian Jadīdism and the Islamic world: Ismail Gasprinskii in Cairo, 1908. A call to the Arabs for the rejuvenation of the Islamic world". Cahiers du Monde Russe et Soviétique. 16 (3): 383–424. doi:10.3406/cmr.1975.1247.
