= Terciman =

Crimean Tatar newspaper (1883–1918)

- Editor: Ismail Gasprinsky; Asan Sabri Ayvazov
- Founder: Ismail Gasprinsky
- First issue: 10 April 1883
- Final issue: February 1918
- Based in: Bakhchysarai, Crimea
- Language: Crimean Tatar (Arabic script), Russian

Terciman or Tercüman (Crimean Tatar: ترجمان, Russian: Переводчикъ, means "The Translator") was a Pan-Turkist weekly newspaper published between 1883 and 1918 by Crimean Tatar intellectual and educator Ismail Gasprinsky in Bakhchysarai. It was the first Crimean Tatar periodical, and the main publication of Turkic peoples in the Russian Empire.

In 1906–1911, Gasprinskiy also published a Crimean Tatar magazine Alem-i Nisvan oriented towards women.

In the aftermath of the Russian February Revolution Terciman supported Crimean Tatar political movement. The weekly was closed soon after Crimean People's Republic was occupied by the Red Army in February 1918.
