= Crimean Tatar literature =

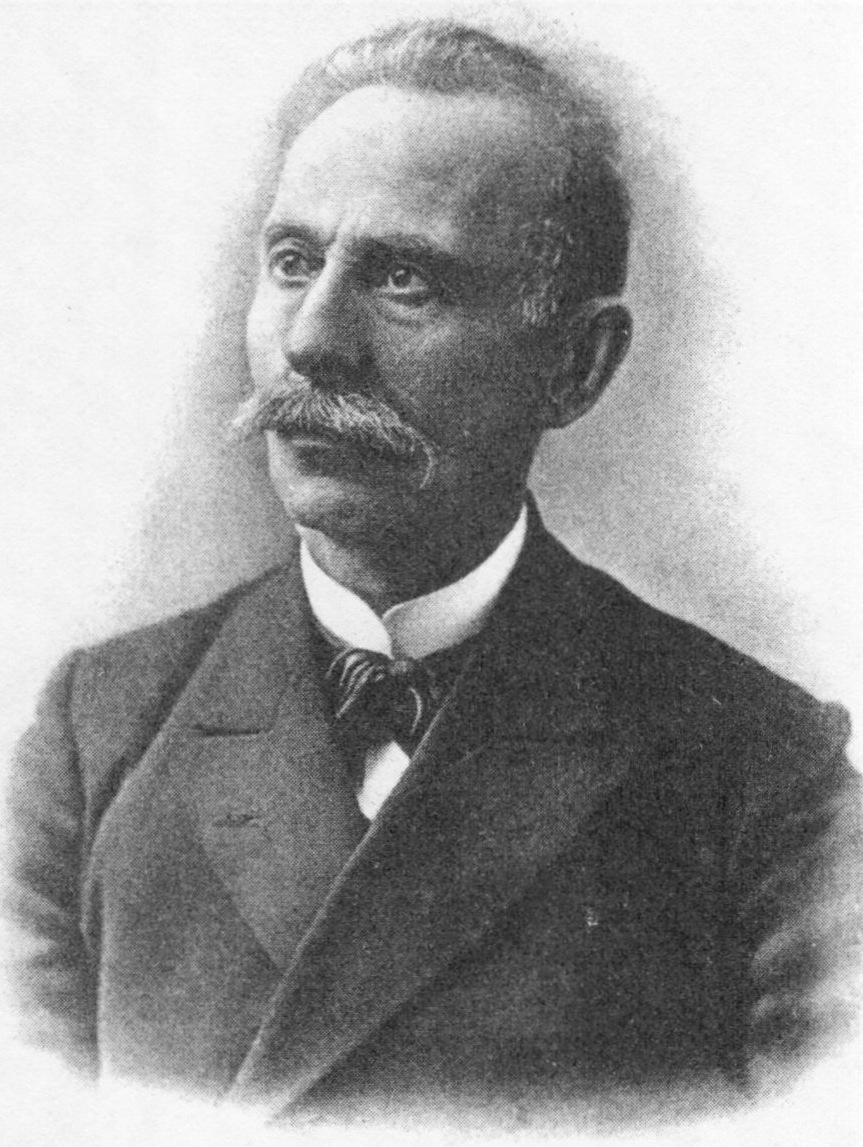
Photo of Ismail Gaspirali

The earliest examples of Crimean Tatar literature (Crimean Tatar: Къырымтатар эдебияты, romanized: Qırımtatar edebiyatı) date back to the times of the Golden Horde (13th-15th centuries), while its golden era took place in the times of Crimean Khanate (15th-18th centuries).

== History ==
=== Middle Ages ===
"The poem about Yusuf and Zuleykha" by Mahmud Qırımlı from 13th century is regarded as the oldest work in Crimean Tatar. Among other prominent authors of that time were Ali (d. 1232), Mahmud (13-14 c.), Mevlana Receb bin Ibrahim (d. 1386), Mevlana Şerefeddin bin Kemal (d. 1438) and Kemal Ummi (d. 1475).

=== Classical period ===
During the Golden Horde period after Crimean Tatars adopted Islam, Divan poetry or Palace poetry (Crimean: saray edebiyatı) started to form. Its authors were khans and aristocrats. Famous poets of that time were Abdul-Mecid Efendi, Usein Kefeviy, Meñli I Giray, Ğazı II Giray, Ramel Hoca, Aşıq Ümer, Mustafa Cevheriy, Leyla Bikeç, Aşıq Arif, Canmuhammed, and Edip Efendi. Ğazı II Giray in particular was known for his poetry, love of literature and works on music. The Bahadır I Giray's wife Han-zade-hanum was also known as a poet. In the 15th-17th centuries anthologies of Crimean poetry appeared.

All literary works of that period were written in Arabic script. The language of poetry was influenced by Arabic and Persian as it used long and short vowels rhymes while Turkic language didn't differentiate vowels this way. At the same time, a more colloquial language with few borrowings was used in folklore (e.g. "Çorabatır", "Kör oğlu", "Tair ve Zore").

Other works include writings about historic events and multiple yarlıqs.

After the Annexation of Crimea by the Russian Empire in 1783, Crimean Tatar literature was frozen as the principal patrons of its development were Crimean khans.

=== New period ===
Crimean literature revival is closely related to Ismail Gasprinsky who laid the foundations of the story and the novel in Crimean Tatar literature. In his newspaper "Terciman", Gasprinsky was publishing works of new Crimean Tatar writers. Among prominent poets of early 20th century were Eşref Şemi-zade, Bekir Çoban-zade, Abdulla Dermenci, Şevqiy Bektöre, Abdulla Latif-zade, Amdi Giraybay. In 1901, Abdulla Özenbaşlı published the first Crimean Tatar drama "Olcağa çare almaz".

Crimean Tatar literary process was interrupted by the Soviet Deportation of the Crimean Tatars in 1944. Since that time and until the 1970s in the Soviet Union Crimean Tatar literature has been suppressed.

Some of the modern authors include Şamil Aladin, Cengiz Dağcı, Ümer İpçi, Yusuf Bolat, Ayder Osman, Ervin Ümerov, Rustem Müyedin, Şakir Selim, Yunus Qandım, Seyran Suleyman, Nuzet Ümerov.

== See also ==
- Ottoman literature
- Tatar literature
- Bashkir literature
