= Qaytarma =

Crimean Tatar dance

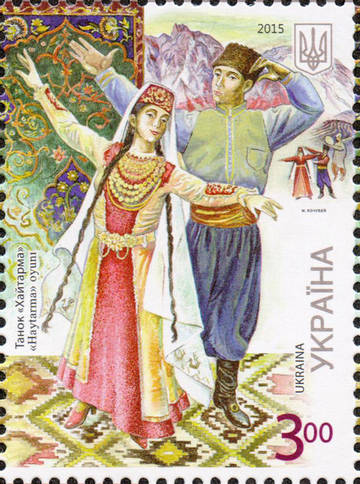
- Qaytarma as depicted on a 2015 stamp of Ukraine
- Genre: Folk dance
- Inventor: Crimean Tatars or Sephardic Jews
- Year: Before 1793
- Origin: Sufi whirling (Possibly; see History)

Qaytarma (lit. 'Returning'; also written as Haytarma) is a form of Crimean Tatar folk dance and folk music characterised by cyclical motion. It is most commonly performed at weddings and on holidays.

== Description ==
During Qaytarma, a male dancer holds his arms apart and forms fists, making short, provocative movements with small jumps. His dancing partner, usually a woman, acts without sharp movements. Instead, she performs exact movements of her legs and shoulders, making smooth, rotational hand movements. According to other studies, among them those conducted by Yaya Şerfedinov, only women should participate in Qaytarma, or, if men participate, they should do so separately from women.

In addition to Crimean Tatars, Krymchaks, Crimean Karaites, Urums, and Ukrainian Greeks also dance Qaytarma. According to researcher Serhiy Zaichenko, Qaytarma music is typically in 9/8 or 7/8 time, which is common of Turkic music.

== History ==
The exact origins of Qaytarma remain uncertain, but two theories are dominant. The first, proposed by Anatolii Bohorod, suggests that it originates from Sufi whirling. The second theory claims that the dance originated with the arrival of Sephardic Jews in Crimea following their expulsion from the Iberian Peninsula through the Crimean Roma. Qaytarma was first mentioned in 1793.

In a 1925 archaeological and ethnographic expedition of Crimea, Crimean Tatar researchers Usein Bodaninsky, Osman Aqçoqraqlı, and Asan Refatov recorded 25 different versions of Qaytarma. Refatov further concluded in 1932 that Qaytarma was unique to the Crimean Tatars, without influence from Russian, Turkish, or Iranian culture. In Zaichenko's 1995 study of Greek Ukrainian dances, he recorded further variations of Qaytarma practiced in the south-eastern Pryazovia region.

== In popular culture ==
The first written piece of Qaytarma music was created by Alexander Spendiaryan in 1903 during his stay in Bilohirsk (then known as Karasubazar) as part of his Crimean Sketches symphony. Unlike most authentic pieces, Spendiaryan's Khaytarma (Russian: Хайтарма) is in 3/8 time.

In the 1930s, Ennan Alimov painted a piece about Qaytarma, titled Girl Dancing Qaytarma.

The Qaytarma ensemble was established in 1939 as part of the Crimean State Philharmonic.

Crimean Tatar director Akhtem Seitablayev has referenced Qaytarma multiple times, most notable as the title and opening sequence of his 2013 film Haytarma. On Tantsi z zirkamy, he performed the dance alongside dancer Olena Shoptenko.

Elements of Qaytarma and Tım-tım, another Crimean Tatar folk dance, were incorporated into the music video for the song 1944.

In 2015, Ukrposhta issued a stamp depicting Qaytarma as part of its Crimean Tatar stamp series.
