= Efendiyev =

Efendiyev (Azerbaijani: Əfəndiyev) (feminine: Efendiyeva (Azerbaijani: Əfəndiyeva)) is a surname. Notable people with the surname include:

- Adaviye Efendiyeva (1879–1944), Crimean Tatar weaver and embroider
- Mir-Hamza Efendiyev (born 1950), Azerbaijani diplomat
- Samira Efendiyeva (born 1991), better known as Samira Efendi, Azerbaijani singer
