= Servicing =

Servicing may refer to:

- car servicing, a series of maintenance procedures carried out at a set time-interval or after the vehicle has travelled a certain distance
- computer maintenance
- loan servicing, the process by which a mortgage bank collects the timely payment of interest and principal from borrowers
- mortgage servicing, company to which some borrowers pay their mortgage loan payments and which performs other services

== See also ==
- Service (disambiguation)
- Serving (disambiguation)
