= Yusuf and Zulaikha =

Story occurring in Christian, Muslim and Jewish traditions

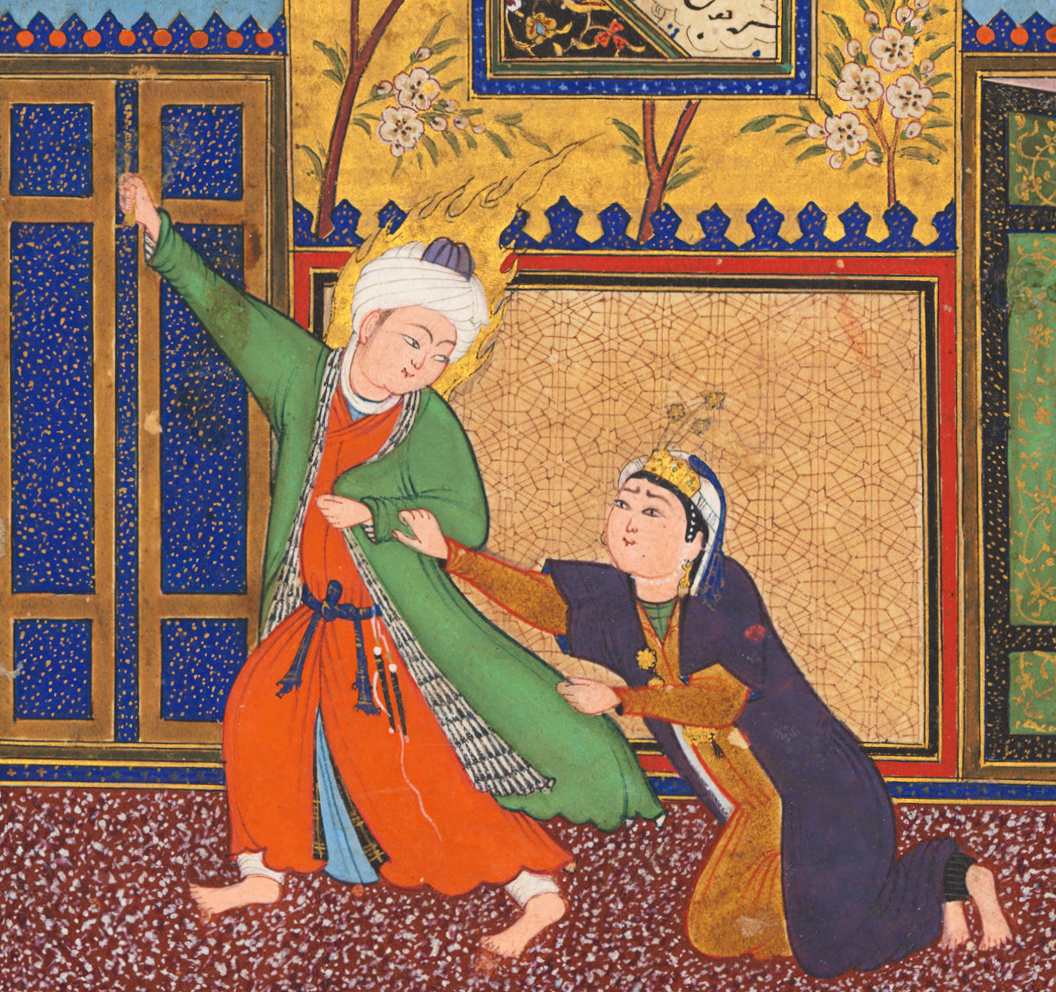
Persian miniature depicting Zulaikha chasing Yusuf

Yusuf and Zulaikha (the English transliteration of both names varies greatly) is a title given to many tellings in the Muslim world of the story of the relationship between the prophet Yusuf and Potiphar's wife. Developed primarily from the account in Sura 12 of the Qur'an, a distinct story of Yusuf and Zulaikha seems to have developed in Persia around the tenth century CE. According to Agnès Kefeli, "in the biblical and Qur’anic interpretations of Joseph's story, Potiphar's wife bears all the blame for sin and disappears quickly from the narrative". But "in Turkic and Persian literatures, Joseph and Zulaykha do, ultimately, become sexually united, in parallel to their noncorporeal mystical union". The story of Yusuf and Zulaikha is subsequently found in many languages, such as Arabic, Persian, Bengali, Turkish, Punjabi and Urdu. Its most famous version was written in the Persian language by Jami (1414–1492), in his Haft Awrang ('Seven Thrones').

== Origins ==
Though found widely in the Muslim world, the story of Yusuf and Zulaika seems first to have developed an independent form in Persian literature around the tenth century CE: there is evidence for a lost narrative poem on the subject by the tenth-century Abu l-Muʾayyad Balkhī (as well as one by an otherwise unknown Bakhtiyārī of apparently similar date). The principal source was the Qur'an's twelfth sura, which recounts the whole of Yusuf's life, supplemented by commentaries on the Qur'an and retellings of Yusuf's life in the genre of biographies of the Prophets known as Qiṣaṣ al-anbiyāʾ, along with Syriac Christian works and (probably mostly indirectly) the Hebrew Midrash.

=== Zulaikha's name ===
Neither the Qur'an nor narrations from the ahadith state that Aziz's (Potiphar) wife's name is Zulaikha. In the Qur'an she is named simply ٱمْرَأَتُ ٱلْعَزِيزِ (Imra'at ul 'Azeez, 'Aziz's wife'). The classical Islamic scholar al-Haafiz Ibn Kathir suggested that her title was Zulaikha. The name was popularized from the poem "Yusuf and Zulaikha" by 15th century poet Jami and later medieval Jewish sources.

=== The Qur'anic account ===
The story of Yusuf and Zulaikha takes place in the twelfth chapter of the Qur’an, titled "Yusuf." The story plays a primary role within the chapter, and begins after Yusuf, son of Yaqub ibn Ishaq ibn Ibrahim, is abandoned and subsequently sold to an Egyptian royal guard.

After reaching maturity, Yusuf becomes so beautiful that his master's wife, later called Zulaikha in the Islamic tradition, falls in love with him. Blinded by her desire, she locks him in a room with her and attempts to seduce him. Through his great wisdom and power, Yusuf resists her and turns around to open the door. Upset, Zulaikha attempts to stop him, and in the process, rips the back of his shirt. At this moment, Zulaikha's husband (the lord of the house and Yusuf's master) catches Zulaikha and Yusuf struggling at the door and calls for an explanation. Deflecting the blame, Zulaikha tells her husband that Yusuf attempted to seduce her. Yusuf contradicts this and tells the lord that Zulaikha wanted to seduce him. The lord is unsure who is guilty, but the young baby of a servant of the household tells him that the placement of the rip on Yusuf's shirt will tell the truth about what truly happened. According to the baby, if Yusuf's shirt was ripped at the front, he must have been going toward Zulaikha, attempting to seduce her. On the other hand, if Yusuf's shirt was ripped from the back, he was trying to get away from Zulaikha; therefore, Zulaikha was guilty. After examining Yusuf's shirt and seeing the rip on the back, Yusuf's master determines his wife is the guilty party, and angrily tells her to ask forgiveness for her sin.

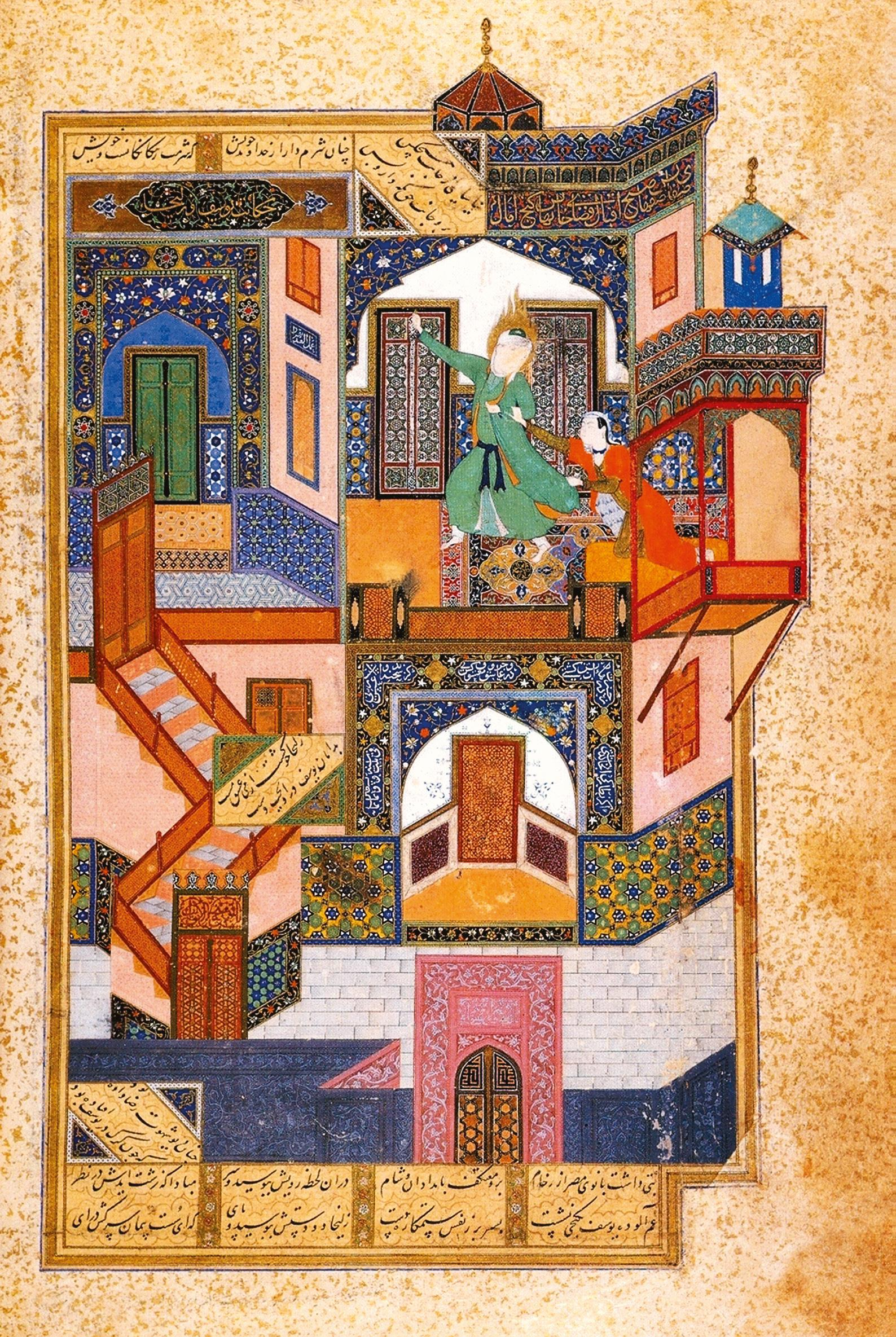
Yusuf and Zulaikha (Yusuf pursued by Potiphar's wife), miniature signed by Behzād, 1488.

Later, Zulaikha overhears a group of women speaking about the incident, verbally shaming Zulaikha for what she did. Zulaikha, angered by this, gives each woman a knife and calls for Yusuf. Upon his arrival, the women cut themselves with their knives, shocked by his beauty. Zulaikha, boosted by proving to the women that any woman would fall for Yusuf, proudly claims that Yusuf must accept her advances, or he will be imprisoned.

Disturbed by Zulaikha's claim, Yusuf prays to Allah, begging Allah to make them imprison him, as Yusuf would rather go to jail than do the bidding of Zulaikha and the other women. Allah, listening to Yusuf's request, makes the chief in power believe Yusuf should go to prison for some time, and so Yusuf does.

=== Development in Arabic literature ===
Although Agnès Kefeli has said that "in Turkic and Persian literatures (although not in the Qur’an or the Arabic tales of the prophets), Joseph and Zulaykha do, ultimately, become sexually united", their union does occur in some Arabic literature. Examples include Muḥammad al-Kisāʾī's probably 11th-century CE Qiṣaṣ al-anbiyāʾ: here Zulaykha comes to Yūsuf during the Egyptian famine, facing starvation, whereupon Yūsuf restores her to her accustomed grandeur and marries her, and God restores her youth and beauty. Zulaykha turns out to be a virgin because her previous husband Potiphar "was impotent because he was prideful" and she bears two sons. Another example is the probably 17th-century Egyptian account of Joseph edited by Faïka Croisier as L’histoire de Joseph d’après un manuscrit oriental.

== In poetry ==
=== Persian ===
==== Early versions ====
The first surviving Persian narrative account of Yusuf and Zulaikha is a probably eleventh-century mathnawī called Yūsuf u Zulaykhā. From as early as the fifteenth century into the twentieth, this account was thought to be by the renowned poet Firdawsī, composer of the secular Persian epic Shahnameh, but the authorship is now regarded as unknown. ϒūsuf u Zulayk̲h̲ā mentions earlier versions of the same story, now lost, by Abu l-Muʾayyad Balkhī and Bakhtiyārī. At least two main redactions of ϒūsuf u Zulayk̲h̲ā are known, with different versions as short as 6,500 lines and as long as 9,000. According to J. T. P. Brujin, 'the story is framed by the life of Yūsuf’s father, the prophet Yaʿḳūb, and is told on the lines of traditional prophetic legend [...] The religious significance of the subject is emphasised, but no mystical meanings are implied'. As of the late twentieth century, the poem had yet to receive a systematic analysis of its textual history and a scholarly edition, but two non-critical editions and a German translation existed.

While Yūsuf u Zulaykhā does not seem to have been particularly influential on Persian tradition, it was a key source for the account of Yusuf in Shāhīn-i Shīrāzī's Judaeo-Persian Bereshit-nāma, a mathnawī on the Book of Genesis composed around 1358.

==== Jami ====
In 1483 AD, the renowned poet Jami wrote his interpretation of the allegorical romance and religious texts of Yusuf and Zulaikha. It became a classical example and the most famous version of Sufi interpretation of Qur’anic narrative material. Jami's example shows how a religious community takes a story from a sacred text and appropriate it in a religious-socio-cultural setting that is different from the original version. Therefore, it is known as a masterpiece of Sufi mystical poetry. As well as being available in a scholarly edition of the Persian, the work has been translated into German, French, Russian, and English.

Jami opens the poem with a prayer. In the narrative, Yusuf is a uniquely handsome young man, so beautiful he has an influence on everyone that meets him. Due to his beauty, he becomes a victim of his brothers' jealousy, and they take him to be sold to the in a slave market in Egypt. Jami shows that Yusuf's brothers' greed is not how to live a Sufi life. Yusuf is put up for sale and astounds everyone with his beauty. This causes a commotion in the market and the crowd starts bidding for him. Zulaikha, the rich and beautiful wife of Potiphar, sees him and, struck by Yusuf's beauty, outbids everyone and buys him.

For years, Zulaikha suppresses her desire for Yusuf until she can resist it no longer and she attempts to seduce him. When Potiphar finds out, he sends Yusuf to prison, causing Zulaikha to live with extreme guilt. One day while in prison, Yusuf proves able to interpret the Pharaoh's dream, and thus the Pharaoh makes Yusuf his treasurer. Because of this, Yusuf is able to meet with Zulaikha. He sees that she still loves him and is miserable. He takes her in his arms and prays to God. The prayer and the love Yusuf and Zulaikha have for each other attracts a blessing from God, who restores youth and beauty to Zulaikha. The couple marry and live thereafter.

What the audience learns from this story is that God's beauty appears in many forms and that Zulaikha's pursuit of love from Yusuf is, in fact, the love and pursuit of God. In Jami's version, Zulaikha is the main character and even more important thematically and narratively than Yusuf. Yusuf, on the other hand, is a two-dimensional character. Another difference in Jami's version is that the overwhelming majority of the story is unrelated to the Qur’an. Finally, Jami claims that his inspiration to write this version of the story comes from love.

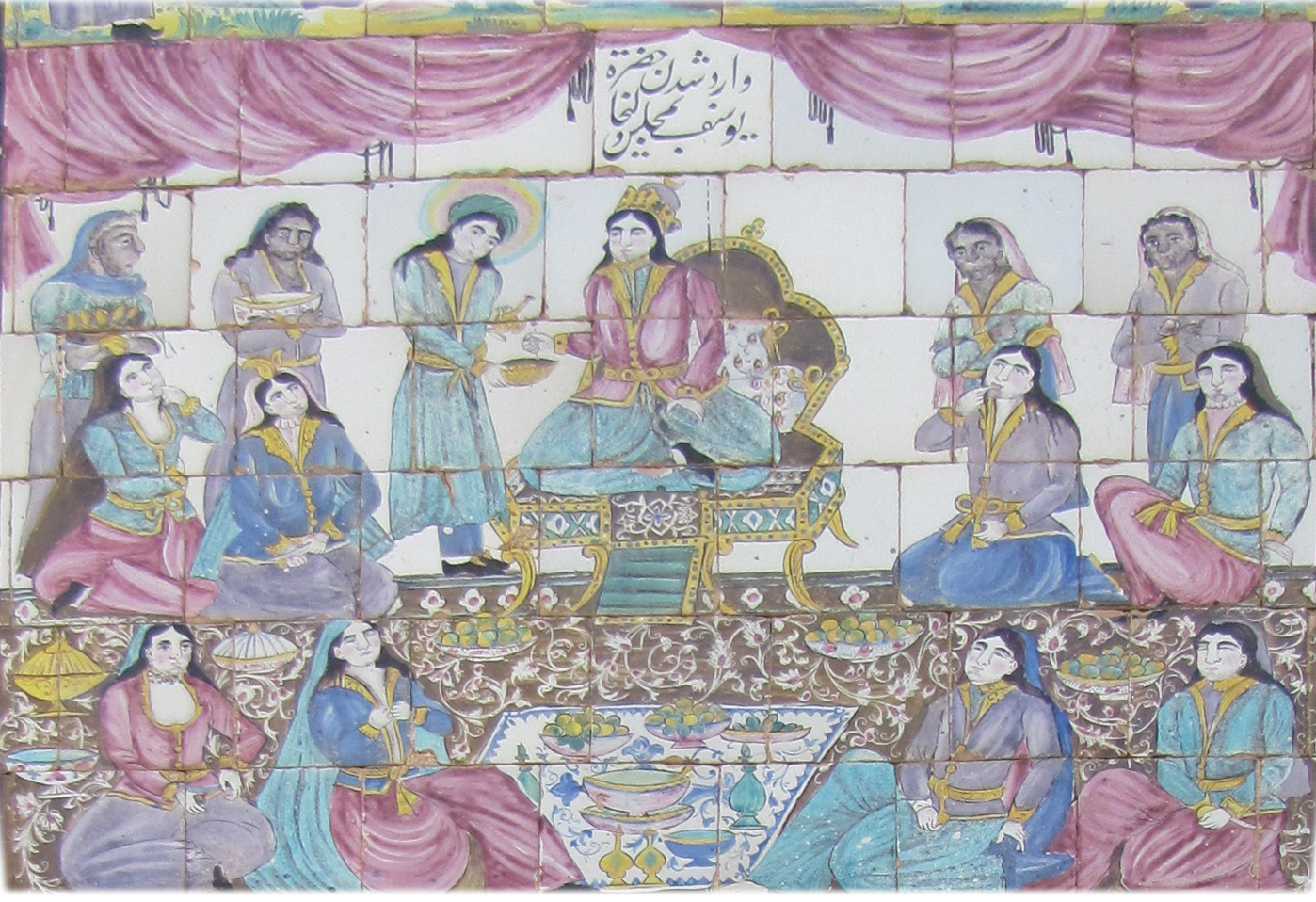
Yusuf in Zuleikha's party. Painting in Takyeh Moaven-ol-Molk, Kermanshah, Iran

=== In South Asia ===
==== Shah Muhammad Saghir ====
As Islam continued to spread, authors across Asia resonated with the story of Yusuf and Zulaikha. Jami's adaptation of the famous tale served as the model for many writers. Bengali author Shah Muhammad Saghir also published his own reinterpretation. Though little information is available about his life and the sources from which he drew, it is assumed to have been written between 1389 and 1409. Through this work, he set the precedent for romance in Bengali literature. One of the unique attributes of Sagir's version is the change of setting, as his poem takes place in Bengal. A prime example of syncretism, it blends elements of Hindu culture with the classic Islamic tale, which in turn encourages readers to coexist with other faiths. It is also testament to Islamic influence on the Indian subcontinent. It is known for its detailed descriptions of Yusuf and Zulaikha's physical beauty, and begins with the two protagonists' childhoods, which then unravels into a tale full of passion and pursuit. Sagir's Yusuf-Zulekha also keeps in touch with the Islamic values found in the original story and echoes the Sufi belief that to love on earth is to love Allah. Although Sagir intended his poem not to be read as a translation of the Quranic version nor as sourced from the Persians before him, he did borrow Persian linguistic traditions in order to write it. Following the introduction of Sagir's poem, other Bengali writers throughout the centuries took inspiration and created their own versions of Yusuf and Zulaikha, including Abdul Hakim and Shah Garibullah. Hakim took his inspiration directly from Jami, while Garibullah chose to write something more unique.

==== Other versions ====
In Punjab, renditions of the legend were authored by Hakim (1803), Gulam Rasul (1873), and Habib Ali (1907). There also exists a Punjabi Qisse version of Yusuf and Zulaikha, composed by Hafiz Barkhurdar, that contains around 1200 pairs of rhyming verses. He, too, was inspired by Jami, while incorporating his own stylistic choices. In Barkhurdar's version, Yusuf is reunited with his father, Yaqub at the end. This is an example of a written qissa, or a Punjabi style of storytelling that emphasizes folkloric tradition. Barkhurdar's rendition was not published until the nineteenth century, and by then it was considered too antiquated for mainstream reading. In fact, many versions of Yusuf and Zulaikha have been lost to time. However, the popularity of the story can be used to measure the impact of Persianization on South Asia. This is evident in Maulvi Abd al-Hakim's interpretation of Yusuf and Zulaikha, which directly imitates Jami as well as other features of the Persian language. Nevertheless, these stories contributed to the development of the 'qissa' as a genre.

Based on Jami's Persian version, Munshi Sadeq Ali also wrote this story as a poetic-style puthi in the Sylheti Nagari script, which he titled Mahabbatnama.

Other writers who retold the story were Sayyid Mīrān Hāshimī (d. 1108 AH/1697 CE), who put the story into mathnāwī form as Yūsuf u Zulaykhā in 1098 AH/1687 CE, and Mahmud Gami (d. 1855) in Kashmiri.

=== In Turkic languages ===
A version by Mahmud Qırımlı from the thirteenth century CE is regarded as the first literary work written in the Crimean Tatar language; meanwhile, a Kyssa'i Yusuf in Old Tatar by Qul Ğəliy is thought to have been completed around the same time and remained hugely influential among Muslim Tatars into the nineteenth century. The same century saw Şeyyad Ḥamza compose a 1529-line morality play Destān-ı Yūsuf ('Tale of Joseph').

The Qiṣaṣ-i Rabghūzī, a Khwārazm Turkish collection of stories of the prophets completed around 1310/11 CE, gives a prominent place to an account of Yusuf and Zulaikha, claiming that it is the best of stories. In the summary of Barbara Flemming,

Yūsuf, the dreamer of dreams, favourite of his father, cast into a well by his brothers, rescued and sold to the master of a caravan, led into Egypt, encounters the female protagonist, Zulayk̲h̲ā, the wife of the mighty one of Egypt, ʿAzīz Miṣr [...] named Ḳiṭfīr [...]. Her beauty is second only to that of Yūsuf. She wishes to commit adultery with him; Yūsuf is acquitted but goes to prison, where he interprets dreams. Zulayk̲h̲ā’s love is eventually rewarded when as an aged, blind and poor widow, she is brought before Yūsuf. She recovers her youth, her beauty, and her sight, and D̲j̲ibrīl performs their marriage [...] Zulayk̲h̲a is a virgin, Ḳiṭfīr having been an eunuch. They live together for eighteen years and have seven children.

In the same century, Muṣṭafā Ḍarīr composed a Mamluk Anatolian Turkish mathnāwī entitled Yūsuf we Zulaykhā, which at the time of the second edition of the Encyclopaedia of Islam had not been edited.

In 1492 CE, an Ottoman Turkish mathnawī of Yusuf and Zulaikha, mixing poetry in the khafīf metre with ghazal was completed by Ḥamd Allāh Ḥamdī. It was primarily based on Jami's Persian version, but also claimed to draw on the earlier Persian version attributed to Firdawsī. According to Flemming,

Putting some emphasis on Yūsuf and his envious brothers, Ḥamdī devotes much space to Zulayk̲h̲a, the daughter of King Taymūs, who marries Ḳiṭfīr by mistake, having fallen in love with Yūsuf in a dream; her attempts to obtain her desire by entreaty and by craft, and Yūsuf’s almost faltering resolution, flight, and imprisonment; his appointment as ʿazīz of Egypt, followed by the death of Zulayk̲h̲ā’s husband, are described. She ages through grief and is reduced to poverty and blindness, but turns in penitence to God and finds favour in His eyes. Yūsuf marries Zulayk̲h̲a. whose beauty and sight are restored to her; her love, however, has passed from love for Yūsuf to the love of the divine beauty, so that she flees from him and they are equal in their love. Reunited with his father and brothers, Yūsuf dies. Zulayk̲h̲a dies on his grave.

Other mathnawī versions were composed by Kemalpaşazade (d. 940 AH/1536 CE), 7,777 couplets in length and Taşlıcalı Yahya (d. 990 AH/1582 CE). Among the last great Turkic accounts of Yusuf and Zulaikha is Ḥadīḳat al-suʿadāʾ by Fuḍūlī (d. 1556), whose manuscripts are often illustrated and which depicts Yusuf and Zulaika alongside other stories of prophets.

== In art ==
The international recognition of the tale of Yusuf and Zulaikha resulted in many artistic renditions of the poem. Substantial periods of conquest and dissolution of Islam throughout Asia and North Africa led to a flurry of diverse artistic interpretations of Yusuf and Zulaikha.

=== Central Asia ===
Within one of the wealthiest trading centers along the Silk Road in Bukhara, Uzbekistan, the manuscript of Bustan of Sa’di would be found. The status of Bukhara as a wealthy Islamic trading hub led to a flourishing of art and culture in the city. From such an economic boom the Bustan of Sa’di created in 1257 C.E portrays many scenes from the poems of Yusuf and Zulaikha. In a frequently reproduced scene, Yusuf leaves the home of Zulaikha after refusing her romantic advances. The scene demonstrated visually a prominent theme from the poem in which we see Yusuf's powerful faith in God overcome his own physical desires. As depicted in the artwork, the locked doors unexpectedly spring open, offering Yusuf a path from Zulaikha's home. In crafting this piece the materials used fall in line with the conventional methods used at the time and were a mixture of oil paints, gold and watercolors.

=== Persia ===
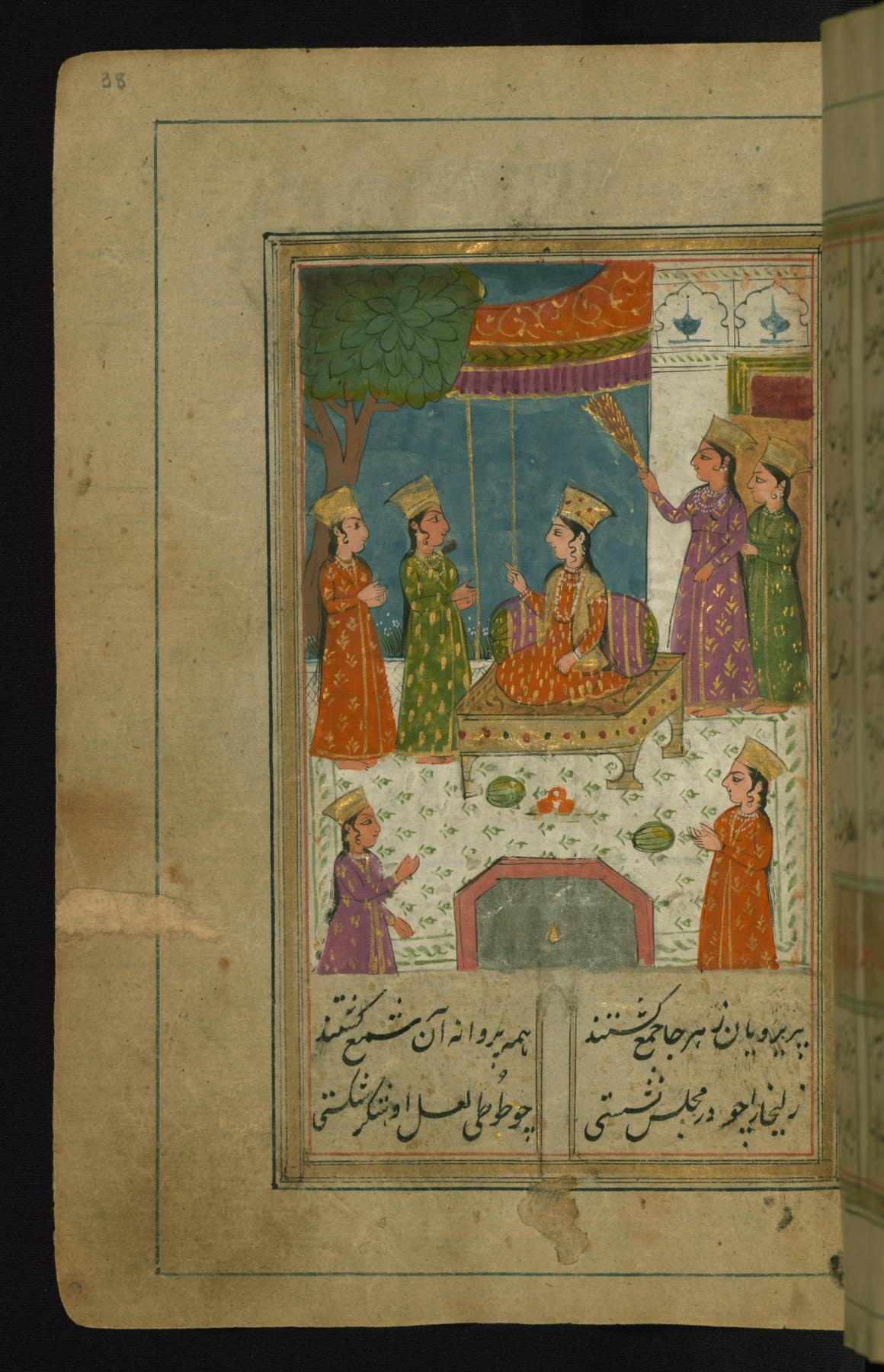
"Zulaikha in the Company of Her Maids" by Muhhamid Murak

From Persia we see what is considered to be, by some experts, the most recognized Illustration of Jami's poem Yusuf and Zulaikha. The artist Kamāl al-Dīn Behzād under the direction of Sultan Husayn Bayqara of the Timurid Empire) constructed a manuscript illustrating the tale of Yusuf and Zulaikha. Behzād has often been credited with initiating a high point of Islamic miniature painting. His artistic style of blending the traditional geometric shape with open spaces to create a central view of his characters was a new idea evident in many of his works. One of Behzhad's most notable works had been his interpretation of the Seduction of Yusuf, where his distinctive style of painting is on display. The painting depicts dynamic movement, with Yusuf and Zulaikha both painted while in motion amidst a backdrop of a stretched out flat background to bring attention to the characters central to the painting.

=== Kashmir ===
In a work originating from the Kashmir region of India, we see how under the Islamic Mughal Empire the renowned poem of Yusuf and Zulaikha continued to flourish in art. The continued interest in illustrating the renowned tale of Yusuf and Zulaikha can be found in a manuscript from Muhhamid Murak dating back to the year 1776. The manuscript offers over 30 paintings styling different scenes from Jami's poem of Yusuf and Zulaikha. Within the manuscript, the unique style of the Mughal painting that had combined Indian and Persian artistic style is demonstrated. There is more emphasis upon realism in Mughal painting and this focus may be seen within Murak's manuscript. The illustration of Zulaikha and her maids offers the viewer a detail oriented scope into the author's imagining of the tale. The historically accurate dress and photorealistic design differ from prior interpretations of the tale which had been more fantastical in nature.

== More information ==
- "English translation of Jami's Joseph and Zuleika (edited by Charles Horne, 1917)" (PDF). (138 KiB)
- Women Writers, Islam, and the Ghost of Zulaikha, by Elif Shafak
- Manuscript text Yusuf und Zalikha in the collection of Museums für Kunst und Gewerbe Hamburg (MKG 1916.35)
- Jāmī in Regional Contexts: The Reception of ʿAbd al-Raḥmān Jāmī's Works in the Islamicate World, ca. 9th/15th-14th/20th Century Series: Handbook of Oriental Studies. Section 1 The Near and Middle East, Volume: 128 Editors: Thibaut d'Hubert and Alexandre Papas, with five chapters on the Yusuf and Zuleykha story:
- Foundational Maḥabbat-nāmas: Jāmī's Yūsuf u Zulaykhā in Bengal (ca. 16th–19th AD) By: Thibaut d’Hubert Pages: 649–691
- Love's New Pavilions: Śāhā Mohāmmad Chagīr's Retelling of Yūsuf va Zulaykhā in Early Modern Bengal By: Ayesha A. Irani Pages: 692–751
- Śrīvara's Kathākautuka: Cosmology, Translation, and the Life of a Text in Sultanate Kashmir By: Luther Obrock Pages: 752–776
- A Bounty of Gems: Yūsuf u Zulaykhā in Pashto By: C. Ryan Perkins Pages: 777–797
- Sweetening the Heavy Georgian Tongue Jāmī in the Georgian-Persianate World By: Rebecca Ruth Gould Pages: 798–828
