= Adaviye Efendiyeva =

Crimean Tatar weaver and embroiderer (1879–1974)

- Adaviye Efendiyeva; Адавие Эфендиева
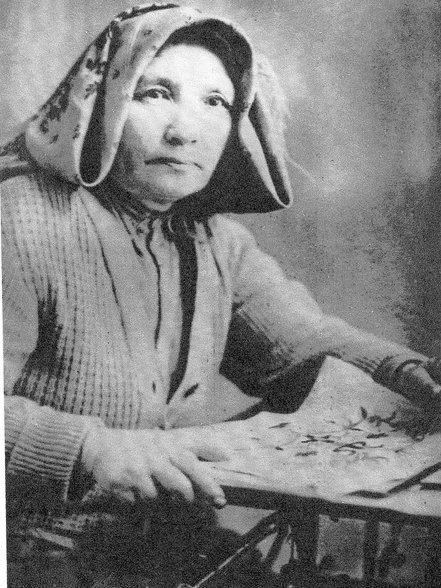
- Born: 1879; Yevpatoria, Crimea, Russian Empire
- Died: 1944 (aged 64–65); Samarkand, Uzbek SSR
- Occupations: master weaver and embroider

Adaviye Efendiyeva (Crimean Tatar: Adaviye Efendiyeva, Адавие Эфендиева; 1879–1944) was a Crimean Tatar master weaver and embroider who died in Samarkand shortly after the 1944 deportation of the Crimean Tatars.

== Biography ==
Adavia Efendiyeva was born in the Crimean city of Yevpatoria in 1879, back when it was part of the Russian Empire. From an early age, her grandmother schooled her in embroidery and weaving. She first used an embroidery machine at the age of twelve and learned to use an electric loom at the age of sixteen. In 1928 she became the head of the embroidery circle at the Yevpatoria museum, where she taught embroidery. Later she worked as an embroidery instructor at an art museum. From her childhood to 1937 she created over 500 embroidered works, which were first put in Moscow art exhibits in 1935. Later her art reached museums in Western Europe and the United States. Shortly after the Red Army retook control of Crimea in 1944 most ethnic Tatars including Efendiyeva were deported to the Uzbek SSR; in the harsh conditions of exile she died soon after arrival in Samarkand. Many of her works, including tablecloths, towels, and embroidered belts, remain on display in the Tavrida Central Museum in Simferopol.

== See also ==
- Usein Bodaninsky
- Şevqiy Bektöre
