= Underhand serve =

Underhand serve or Underhanded serve may refer to:

- Underhand serve (pickleball)
- Underhand serve (tennis)
- Underhand serve (volleyball)

== See also ==
- Underhand (disambiguation)
- Serve (disambiguation)
