= Underarm (disambiguation) =

The underarm (Axilla) is the area on the human body directly under the shoulder joint.

Underarm, underarms etc. may also refer to:

- Under arms, a state of military readiness
- Underarm bowling, a bowling style in cricket
- Underarms and Sideways, a 2005 compilation album by The Hope Blist

== See also ==
- Underhand
