= Crimean Tatar Pedagogical Institute =

University in Simferopol, Crimea

The Crimean Tatar Pedagogical Institute (Russian: Крымский татарский педагогический техникум, romanized: Krymskiy tatarskiy pedagogicheskiy tekhnikum), also known as Totayköy Pedagogical Institute (Russian: Тотайкойский педтехникум, romanized: Totayskoyskiy pedtekhnikum), was a Crimean Tatar university which existed from 1922 to 1931. Originally located in Totayköy (now Fersmanove), the institute moved to Simferopol, after two years.

== History ==
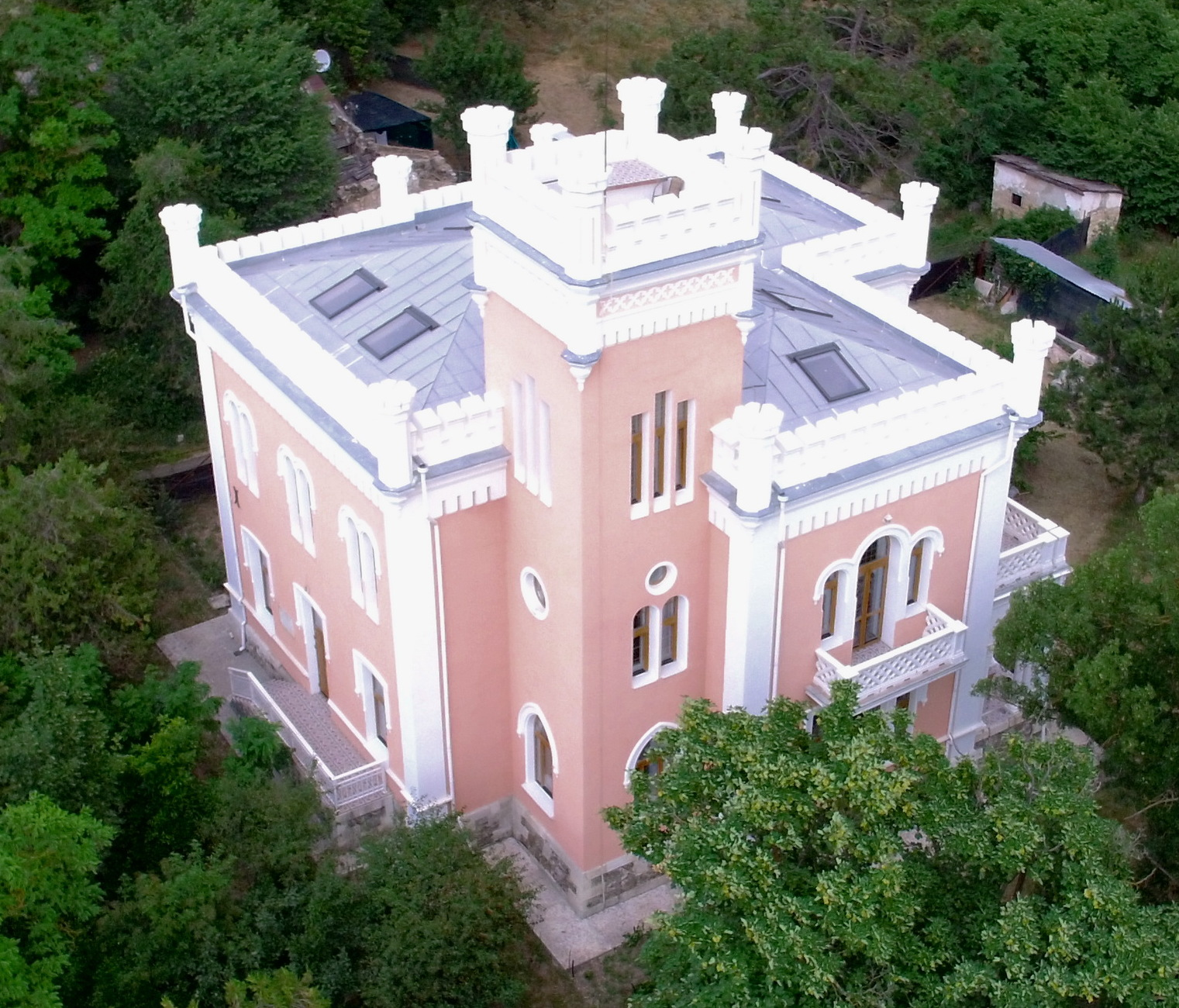
The Kessler-Fersman Castle, the institute's location from 1922 to 1924

The Crimean Tatar Pedagogical Institute was founded in the village of Totayköy (now Fersmanove) in Crimea as the Crimean Pedagogical Courses. Its purpose was to train educators and commissars, as well as to give Crimean Tatars access to practical and specialised education. The courses were opened in the Kessler-Fersman Castle, then recently nationalised by the Soviet authorities. Amet Özenbaşlı was the institute's first director. After only a year, the courses were reorganised into the Crimean Tatar Pedagogical Institute. A term of study was four years. Admission to the technical school was initially carried out on the basis of one's completion of primary education, but later shifted to the finishing of seven years of education. In the first year, there were 150 students. Teaching was carried out in both Crimean Tatar and Russian.

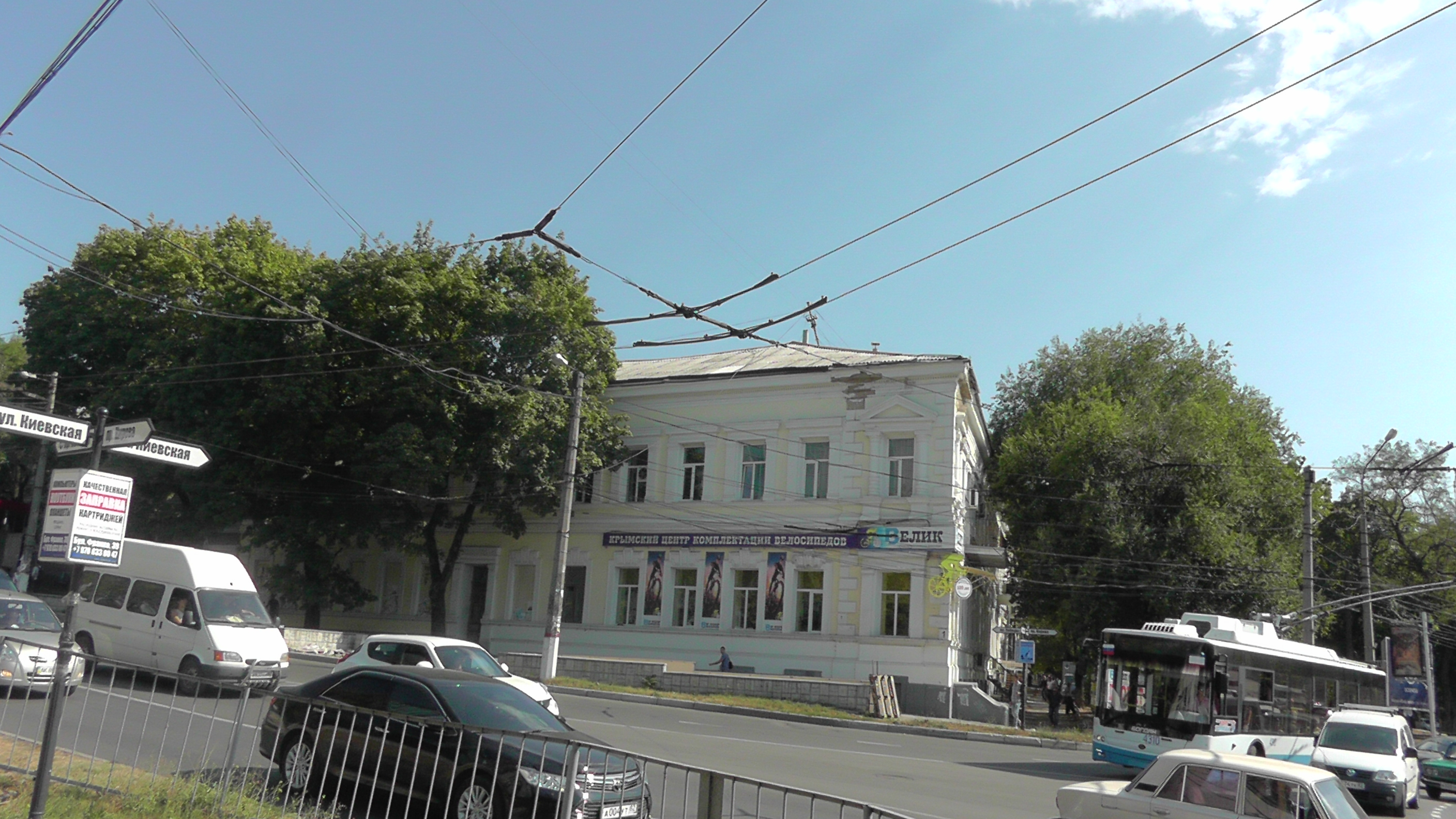
The Khristoforov Commercial House, the institute's location from 1924 to 1931

In the summer of 1924, the institute moved to Simferopol, and established itself in the former Khristoforov Commercial House. From 1924 to 1930, about 190 people studied at the institute. It was outfitted with a library, containing around five thousand literary works, and a school in Çuqurça (now Luhove, part of Simferopol) where students of the institute worked in pedagogical activities.

The institute's educational processes were hampered by students' poor understanding of the Russian language, with a 1928 report stating, "Teaching in Russian, which occupies a total of 52% [of class time], with poor knowledge of Russian by students, as well as the absence of textbooks in their native language and the usage of [textbooks] published in Russian, reduces the productivity of students." In an attempt to amend this issue, the Secretariat of the Crimean Regional Committee of the All-Union Communist Party established a special preparatory group for the institute.

The institute was closed in 1931.

== Teaching staff ==
From 1922 to 1925, there were 18 teachers at the institute, of whom six were Crimean Tatars. From 1926 to 1927, there were 16 teachers, of whom 9 were Crimean Tatars. By 1928, there were 20 teachers at the school, with 7 Crimean Tatars and 13 ethnic Russians.

Many former Crimean Tatar independence activists worked as teachers at the institute. Among them were Bekir Çoban-zade, Şevqiy Bektöre, Abibulla Odabaş, Asan Sabri Ayvazov, Osman Aqçoqraqlı, and Asan Refatov. During his employment at the institute, Refatov wrote the song Totayköy Horanı (lit. 'Totayköy March'), which became the institute's unofficial anthem.

== Alumni ==
During the institute's existence, more than 200 teachers were trained, with a peak of 59 graduates in the 1925-1926 school year.

Among the institute's alumni were Elena Krishtof, Irğat Qadır, Ziyadin Cavtöbeli, Ibraim Bahşiş Shamil Aladin, Mambet Aliyev, Kerim Camanaqlı, Asan Kasımov, Emirasan Kurtmollayev, Osman Vaapov, Üriye Azizova, Cemil Kence, Zeynep Abbasova, and Dzhebbar Akimov.

== Directors ==
- Amet Özenbaşlı (1922-1924)
- Mustafa Bekirov (1924-1925)
- Veli Abilev (1925)
- Yakub Azizov (1925-1928)
- Menzatov (1928-1931)
