= Serve =

Serve or SERVE may refer to:

== Sports ==
- The act of placing a ball or other object in play in sports such as;
  - Serve (pickleball)
  - Serve (tennis)
  - Serve (volleyball)

== People ==
- Marie-Paule Serve (born 1941), was a female French New Caledonian politician.
- Alexandre Robinet de La Serve (1821–1882), was a French sugar manufacturer, journalist and politician.

== Other ==
- Service of process, to formally deliver legal documents
- Secure Electronic Registration and Voting Experiment
- SERVE Afghanistan, a UK-registered charity that works in Afghanistan

== See also ==
- Server (disambiguation)
- Service (disambiguation)
- Serving (disambiguation)
