= Server =

Server may refer to:

- Server (computing), a computer program or a device that provides requested information for other programs or devices, called clients.
- Waiting staff, those who work at a restaurant or a bar attending customers and supplying them with food and drink as requested.
- Altar server, a lay assistant to a member of the clergy during a Christian liturgy
- Server (name), including a list of people
- Server, any serving utensil; see List of serving utensils

== See also ==
- Serve (disambiguation)
- Service (disambiguation)
- Cake and pie server
