= Serving =

Serving may refer to:

- "Serving" (song), by Miriana Conte, Malta's entry for the Eurovision Song Contest 2025
- Serving size
- Providing a non-material good, as in the work of a servant
- Supplying customers with food and drink, as in the work of a food server
- Service of process, the procedure for delivering a legal or administrative summons
- Servitude (disambiguation)
- Worm, parcel and serve, a technique for protecting rope from abrasion

== See also ==
- Serve (disambiguation)
- Service (disambiguation)
