= Perove =

Village in Simferopol Raion, Crimea

Coordinates: 44.9264°N 34.0589°E

Perovo (Russian: Перово) or Perove (Ukrainian: Перове) is a village in Simferopol Raion, Crimea. Before 1948 it was known under the Crimean Tatar name Badana. In Russian Empire it was also called Bodana.

== History ==
An early mention of the settlement in Russian documents is in the 1784 list of Crimean kaymakamships, according to which Bodan was part of the Aqmescit kaymakanship during the last days of the Crimean Khanate. Over time the settlement disappeared, and the modern settlement is considered to be established in 1929 when chicken farming sovkhoz "Bodana" was created by Simferopol. Officially, the settlement Bodana was recognized in 1932. In 1948 it was renamed to Perovo after the submariner Hero of the Soviet Union Ivan Perov.

== People associated with Perovo ==
- Usein Bodaninsky, Crimean Tatar historian, ethnographer and art scholar
