= Server (name) =

Server is a Turkic masculine given name, and a German-American and Spanish surname. The German-origin surname is an American anglicization of the surname Serber, and the Spanish surname is a variation of the Catalan surname Cerver.

Notable people with the name include:

== Given name ==
- Server Djeparov (born 1982), Uzbekistani footballer
- Server Ibragimov (born 1978), Uzbekistani sport shooter
- Server Mustafayev (born 1986), Crimean Tatar activist and political prisoner
- Server Tanilli (1931–2011), Turkish academic and author
- Server Trupçu (ca. 1908–1938), Soviet politician
- Server Uraz (born 1988), Turkish rapper and songwriter

== Surname ==
- Eric Server (born 1944), American actor
- Greg Server (born 1939), American politician
- Josh Server (born 1979), American actor
- Lee Server (1953–2021), American writer
- Pablo Varela Server (1942–2024), Spanish Catholic prelate
