= Servant (disambiguation) =

A servant is a person working within an employer's household.

Servant or servants may refer to:

== Places ==
- Servant, Puy-de-Dôme, France

== Arts, entertainment, and media ==
=== Films ===
- The Servant (1963 film), a British drama
- The Servant (1989 film), a Soviet drama
- The Servant (2010 film), a South Korean film

=== Music ===
- Servant (band), a Canadian Christian rock group
- The Servant (band), an alternative rock band based in London, England
  - The Servant (album), a 2004 album by The Servant
- The Servants, an indie pop band in Hayes, Middlesex, England

=== Other arts, entertainment, and media ===
- The Servant, a 1948 novel by Robin Maugham
- The Servants (novel), a 2008 novel by Michael Marshall Smith
- Servants (TV series), a 2003 costume drama by Lucy Gannon
- Servant (TV series), a 2019 psychological horror web series by M. Night Shyamalan

== Computing and technology ==
- Servant (CORBA), a standard in cross-platform software
- Servant (design pattern), a software design pattern

== Other uses ==
- The Servants / MPR, a Senegalese political party

== See also ==
- Civil servant, a person worked in civil service
- Faithless servant, a legal doctrine
- Servant of the People (disambiguation)
