= Sayyid Miran Hashimi =

South Asian poet

Sayyid Mīrān Hāshimī (d. 1108 AH/1697 CE) was a South Asian poet, characterised by Munibur Rahman as "the last major poet of the ʿĀdil S̲h̲āhī era" (this indicating he was from the Sultanate of Bijapur. His works included a mathnawī entitled Yūsuf u Zulaykhā, composed in 1098 AH/1687 CE.
