= Service =

Service may refer to:

== Activities ==
- Administrative service, a required part of the workload of university faculty
- Civil service, the body of employees of a government
- Community service, volunteer service for the benefit of a community or a punishment that may be imposed by a court
- Fan service, a Japanese term referring to something which is specifically designed to entertain fans
- Feudal service, see Feudal land tenure in England
- Funeral or memorial service
- Military service, serving in a country's armed forces
- Public service, services carried out with the aim of providing a public good
- Selfless service, a service which is performed without any expectation of result or award

== Arts, entertainment, and media ==
- Service (album), a 1983 album by Yellow Magic Orchestra
- Service (film), a 2008 film
- Service (play), a 1932 play by British writer Dodie Smith
- Service (record label), a Swedish record label
- "Service" (The Walking Dead), a 2016 television episode of The Walking Dead
- The Service, an 1840 essay by Henry David Thoreau
- "Service", a song from the album Silver Sun by Silver Sun

== Economics and business ==
- Service (business), an aggregation of a service engagement with one or more service acts between two or more service systems creating service outcomes
- Service (economics), the non-material equivalent of a good in economics and marketing, within a service–product continuum
  - Service economy, which increases the integration of services in other sectors of the economy
  - Service sector, the traditional tertiary sector of the economy, including:
    - Customer service, provision of assistance to customers or clients
    - Domestic service, employment in a residence
    - Table service, food served by waiters and waitresses, also known as servers
  - Service system, or customer service system (CSS), including:
    - Service design
    - Service management
    - Services marketing
- Service contract (disambiguation), with various levels of management, relations or integration in a service system:
  - Service-level agreement
  - Managed services
  - Outsourcing
- Service provider, third party or outsourced suppliers for organizations
- Rest area, where drivers and passengers take a pause from driving
- Motorway service area, also called services in the United Kingdom

== Religion ==
- Church service, a formalized period of Christian communal worship
  - Divine Service (Lutheran), the Eucharistic liturgy as used in the various Lutheran churches
  - Worship services of the Church of Jesus Christ of Latter-day Saints
- Service (Tenrikyo), a prayer ritual in Tenrikyo
- The son of man came to serve, a saying of Jesus

== Technology ==
=== Computing and telecommunications ===
- Service (systems architecture), the provision of a discrete function within a systems environment:
  - Service layer, a conceptual layer within a network service provider architecture
  - Service-oriented architecture (SOA), a design pattern in which application components provide services to other components via a communications protocol, typically over a network
- Service, the function provided by a server (computing)
- Service, local implementations in software:
  - Service, a program in the services menu under macOS that processes selected data
  - Daemon (computing), a background computer program in Unix
  - Windows service, a background computer process belonging to no user in a Microsoft Windows system
- Network service
- Radiocommunication service, according to ITU Radio Regulations (RR) Article 1.19
- Telecommunications service, including:
  - Internet Relay Chat services (IRC), a set of features implemented in most modern Internet Relay Chat networks
  - Software as a service (SaaS)
  - Web hosting service
  - Web service, a software system to support interaction over a network
- Value-added service or content service provided by communication service provider (CSP), including:
  - Services of an Intelligent Network (IN), for telecommunications
    - GSM services

=== Other uses in technology ===
- Service (motor vehicle), maintenance procedures carried out after a vehicle has traveled a certain distance
- Building services engineering
- Penetrant (mechanical, electrical, or structural), as defined by a building code

== Other uses ==
- A collection of matching tableware:
  - Tea service
  - Dinner service
  - Cabaret service
- Servant leadership, leadership reconceptualized as service to those below
- Service (surname)
- Service, Missouri, a community in the United States
- Empire Service (1943–1961), one of the Empire ships in service of the British government
- Serve (tennis) or service, a shot to start a point in tennis
- Service High School, a public high school in Anchorage, Alaska
- Service of process, the delivery of a summons, complaint or other court petition
- Services football team, an Indian club representing the Armed Services
- Sorbus domestica (Service Tree), a species of tree
- Universal basic services, a form of social security

== See also ==
- Altruism, a principle or practice of caring for the welfare of others
- Goods and services
- Servant (disambiguation)
- Server (disambiguation)
- Volunteering, action taken to benefit others for no benefit to the one performing the action
