= Usein Bodaninsky =

Crimean historian, artist, and ethnographer (1877-1938

Üsein Bodaninskiy
- Born: 1 December 1877; Badana, Russian Empire (now Perove, Crimea)
- Died: 17 April 1938 (aged 60); Simferopol, Crimean ASSR, Russian SFSR, Soviet Union (now Crimea)
- Education: Stroganov Moscow State Academy of Arts and Industry

Üsein Abdurefi oğlu Bodaninskiy (Russian: Усеи́н Абдрефи́евич Бодани́нский, romanized: Usein Abdrefiyevich Bodaninsky; 1 December 1877 – 17 April 1938) was Crimean Tatar historian, artist, art critic, and ethnographer, and the first director of the Bakhchisaray Palace Museum.

== Biography ==
His surname is of Russian-language toponymic derivation and means "from Bodana". "Üsein" is a variant of Hussein. He was born in Crimea, in the village Bodana of Simferopol uyezd (district), Taurida Governorate, Russian Empire, now Perovo (Simferopol District).

In 1917 he was appointed director of Bakhchisaray Palace. Bodaninsky's brother died fighting for the Bolsheviks during the Russian civil war in 1920. In the mid 1920s he led a major trip in Crimea for the recovery and study of historic manuscripts, folklore, and architecture.

In 1937, during the Great Purge, he was arrested in Tbilisi, accused of nationalist anti-Soviet activities, speedily charged based on Stalin's shooting lists, and shot without trial on 17 April 1938, along with a number of other prominent representatives of Crimean Tatar culture: Asan Sabri Ayvazov, Yakub Ablyamitov, Yakub Azizov, Osman Aqçoqraqlı, Ramazan Alexandrovich, Yagya Bayrashevsky, Jafar Gafarov, Kerim Dzhemaledinov, Suleiman Idrisov, Ibraim Ismailov, Abdulla Latif-zade, Fevzi Musanif, Mamut Nedim, Abduraim Samedinov, İlyas Tarhan, Server Trupçu, Seitjilil Khattatov, and Bilyal Chagar.
