= Chirnogeni =

- Commune
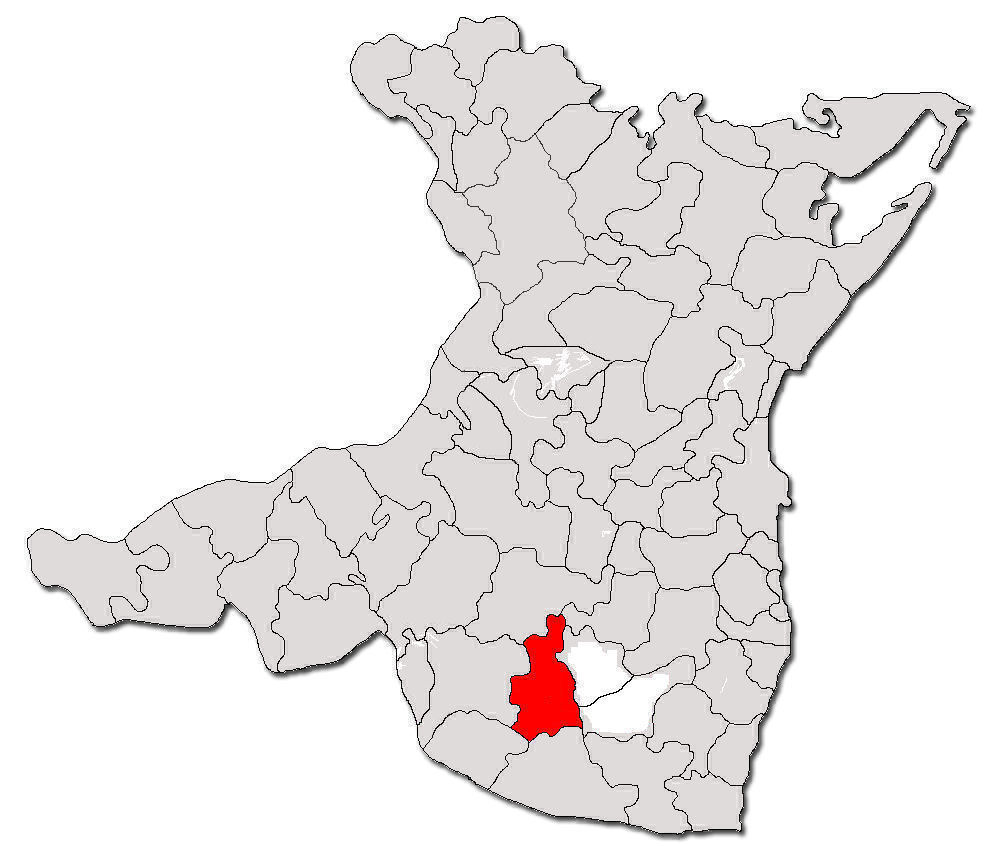
- Location in Constanța County

- Location in Romania
- Coordinates: 43°54′0″N 28°14′0″E
- Country: Romania
- County: Constanța
- Subdivisions: Chirnogeni, Credința, Plopeni

Government
  - Mayor (2020–2024): Gheorghe Manta (PSD)
- Area: 116.06 km^{2} (44.81 sq mi)
- Population (2021-12-01): 2,959
  - Density: 25.50/km^{2} (66.03/sq mi)
- Time zone: UTC+02:00 (EET)
  - Summer (DST): UTC+03:00 (EEST)
- Vehicle reg.: CT
- Website: www.primaria-chirnogeni.ro

Chirnogeni (Romanian pronunciation: [kirnoˈd͡ʒenʲ]) is a commune in Constanța County, Northern Dobruja, Romania.

The commune includes two villages:

- Chirnogeni (historical name: Ghiuvenlia, Turkish: Güvenli), named after Chirnogi, whence many settlers came
- Credința (historical name: Sofular, Turkish: Sofular)
- Plopeni (historical name: Cavaclar, Turkish: Kavaklar)

== Demographics ==
At the 2011 census, Chirnogeni had 3,105 Romanians (98.98%), 26 Roma (0.83%), 4 Turks (0.13%), 2 others (0.06%).

== Natives ==
- Şevqiy Bektöre
