= Ivan Perov =

Soviet navy boatswain (1910–1989)

Ivan Stepanovich Perov
- Иван Степанович Перов
- Perov, c. 1944
- Born: 6 October 1910
- Died: 26 January 1989 (aged 78)
- Military career
- Allegiance: Soviet Union
- Branch: Soviet Navy
- Service years: 1932 – 1950
- Rank: Michman
- Conflicts: World War II
- Awards: Hero of the Soviet Union

Ivan Stepanovich Perov (Russian: Ива́н Степа́нович Перо́в; 6 October 1910 – 26 January 1989) was a michman of the Soviet Navy, bos'n-signalman of the Soviet submarine L-4 during the Second World War. He also served at some other ships.

On 22 July 1944 he was awarded Hero of the Soviet Union for his courage and heroism. He was also awarded several other orders and medals.

The village of Perove was named after him. A memorial plaque was mounted on the house where he lived in Odessa after the war.
