= Servant (design pattern) =

In software engineering, the servant pattern defines an object used to offer some functionality to a group of classes without defining that functionality in each of them. A Servant is a class whose instance (or even just class) provides methods that take care of a desired service, while objects for which (or with whom) the servant does something, are taken as parameters.

== Description and simple example ==
Servant is used for providing some behavior to a group of classes. Instead of defining that behavior in each class - or when we cannot factor out this behavior in the common parent class - it is defined once in the Servant.

For example: we have a few classes representing geometric objects (rectangle, ellipse, and triangle). We can draw these objects on some canvas. When we need to provide a “move” method for these objects we could implement this method in each class, or we can define an interface they implement and then offer the “move” functionality in a servant. An interface is defined to ensure that serviced classes have methods that servant needs to provide desired behavior. If we continue in our example, we define an Interface “Movable” specifying that every class implementing this interface needs to implement method “getPosition” and “setPosition”. The first method gets the position of an object on a canvas and second one sets the position of an object and draws it on a canvas. Then we define a servant class “MoveServant”, which has two methods “moveTo(Movable movedObject, Position where)” and moveBy(Movable movedObject, int dx, int dy). The Servant class can now be used to move every object which implements the Movable. Thus the “moving” code appears in only one class which respects the “Separation of Concerns” rule.

== Two ways of implementation ==
There are two ways to implement this design pattern:

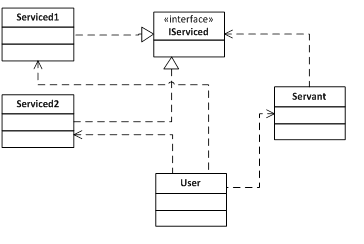
Figure 1: User uses servant to achieve some functionality and passes the serviced objects as parameters.

Figure 2: User requests operations from serviced instances, which then asks servant to do it for them.

1. User knows the servant (in which case it is needed to know the serviced classes) and sends messages with requests to the servant instances, passing the serviced objects as parameters. The serviced classes (geometric objects from our example) don’t know about servant, but they implement the “IServiced” interface. The user class just calls the method of servant and passes serviced objects as parameters. This situation is shown on figure 1.
2. Serviced instances know the servant and the user sends them messages with requests (in which case it isn't necessary to know the servant). The serviced instances then send messages to the instances of servant, asking for service. On figure 2 is shown opposite situation, where user don’t know about servant class and calls directly serviced classes. Serviced classes then asks servant themselves to achieve desired functionality.

== Example ==
This simple Java example shows the situation described above. This example is only illustrative and will not offer any actual drawing of geometric objects, nor specification of what they look like.

// Servant class, offering its functionality to classes implementing
// Movable Interface
public class MoveServant {
	// Method, which will move Movable implementing class to position where
	public void moveTo(Movable serviced, Position where) {
		// Do some other stuff to ensure it moves smoothly and nicely, this is
		// the place to offer the functionality
		serviced.setPosition(where);
	}

	// Method, which will move Movable implementing class by dx and dy
	public void moveBy(Movable serviced, int dx, int dy) {
		// this is the place to offer the functionality
		dx += serviced.getPosition().xPosition;
		dy += serviced.getPosition().yPosition;
		serviced.setPosition(new Position(dx, dy));
	}
}

// Interface specifying what serviced classes needs to implement, to be
// serviced by servant.
public interface Movable {
	public void setPosition(Position p);

	public Position getPosition();
}

// One of geometric classes
public class Triangle implements Movable {
	// Position of the geometric object on some canvas
	private Position p;

        // Method, which sets position of geometric object
	public void setPosition(Position p) {
		this.p = p;
	}

	// Method, which returns position of geometric object
	public Position getPosition() {
		return this.p;
	}
}

// One of geometric classes
public class Ellipse implements Movable {
	// Position of the geometric object on some canvas
	private Position p;

	// Method, which sets position of geometric object
	public void setPosition(Position p) {
		this.p = p;
	}

	// Method, which returns position of geometric object
	public Position getPosition() {
		return this.p;
	}
}

// One of geometric classes
public class Rectangle implements Movable {
	// Position of the geometric object on some canvas
	private Position p;

	// Method, which sets position of geometric object
	public void setPosition(Position p) {
		this.p = p;
	}

	// Method, which returns position of geometric object
	public Position getPosition() {
		return this.p;
	}
}

// Just a very simple container class for position.
public class Position {
	public int xPosition;
	public int yPosition;

	public Position(int dx, int dy) {
		xPosition = dx;
		yPosition = dy;
	}
}

== Similar design pattern: Command ==
Design patterns Command and Servant are very similar and implementations of them are often virtually the same. The difference between them is the approach to the problem.

- For the Servant pattern we have some objects to which we want to offer some functionality. We create a class whose instances offer that functionality and which defines an interface that serviced objects must implement. Serviced instances are then passed as parameters to the servant.
- For the Command pattern we have some objects that we want to modify with some functionality. So, we define an interface which commands which desired functionality must be implemented. Instances of those commands are then passed to original objects as parameters of their methods.

Even though design patterns Command and Servant are similar it doesn’t mean it’s always like that. There are a number of situations where use of design pattern Command doesn’t relate to the design pattern Servant. In these situations we usually need to pass to called methods just a reference to another method, which it will need in accomplishing its goal. Since we can’t pass references to methods in many languages, we have to pass an object implementing an interface which declares the signature of passed method.

== See also ==
- Command pattern

== Resources ==
Pecinovský, Rudolf; Jarmila Pavlíčková; Luboš Pavlíček (June 2006). Let's Modify the Objects First Approach into Design Patterns First (PDF). Eleventh Annual Conference on Innovation and Technology in Computer Science Education, University of Bologna.
