= Mustafa Darir =

Turkish-speaking scholar

Muṣṭafā Ḍarīr (seventh-century AH/fourteenth-century CE, born in Erzurum) was a Turkish-speaking scholar. His epithet ḍarīr means 'blind' and he is believed to have been blind from birth. According to Fahi̇r İz, "Ḍarīr shows remarkable mastery of ʿarūḍ; his verse is fluent and he often reaches the heights of lyric poetry. His pleasant and simple prose is one of the best specimens of early Turkish narrative style".

== Works ==
Muṣṭafā Ḍarīr composed the following works:

- Tarjumat al-Ḍarīr (a five-volume Turkish-language adaptation and expansion of Abu al-Ḥasan al-Bakrī's version of Ibn Isḥāq's sīra, commissioned by the then sultan of Egypt, al-Manṣūr ʿAlāʾ al-Dīn ʿAlī, and completed in 790 AH/1388 CE).
- A translation and adaptation of Futūḥ al-Shām by al-Wāqidī, which Muṣṭafā Ḍarīr completed in 795 AH/1392 CE while in Aleppo.
- A translation of a work known as The Hundred Ḥadīths
- Yūsuf we Zulaykhā (a mathnawī)
