= Elena Krishtof =

Soviet Russian writer, and educator (1925–2001)

- Born: 16 June 1925; Alushta, Crimean Oblast, Soviet Union
- Died: 1 August 2001 (aged 76); Simferopol, Autonomous Republic of Crimea, Ukraine
- Education: Crimean State Pedagogical Institute
- Occupations: Writer; journalist; teacher
- Writing career
- Notable awards: Honored Artist of the Autonomous Republic of Crimea; 2000

Elena Georgievna Krishtof (16 June 1925 – 1 August 2001) was a Soviet Russian writer, and educator. She was a member of the Union of Soviet Writers (1965), and Honored Artist of the Autonomous Republic of Crimea (2000).

== Life ==
Elena Georgievna Krishtof was born on June 16, 1925, in Alushta, Crimean Oblast, USSR (now Autonomous Republic of Crimea). Her mother, Anastasia Ivanovna, was a housewife. Her father, Georgy Ivanovich Krishtof, was a communist and agronomist. He worked in Germany, and headed a state-owned tobacco farm in Alushta. Her father died of tuberculosis when she was nine years old. During the World War II, the family lived in Crimea.

In 1950, Krishtof graduated from the philological faculty of the Crimean State Pedagogical Institute (1950). She was appointed as a teacher of Russian language and literature in the village of Pervomaiske, where she worked until 1953. While working at the school, Krishtof was engaged in writing and journalism. Her work was published in regional and provincial newspapers. Her first story, "School in the Steppe", was published in 1956 in the anthology Crimea.

In 1959, she received a literary prize for the collection of stories Sunny Day. At the same time, the story "May Before the Exams" was published in the magazine Yunost.

From 1954 to 1960, she was the inspector of the regional department of general education. After the Crimean TV channel began broadcasting, Krishtof became an employee of the art editorial office.

In 1965, Krishtof was admitted to the Union of Soviet Writers, for which she received a room in a communal apartment.

Krishtof's last book was published in 2001. Krishtof died on August 1, 2001, in Simferopol, and buried at the Abdal Cemetery in Simferopol.

== Legacy ==
Krishtof is the namesake of a reading room in the central regional library in Pervomaiske, Crimea.

Her papers are held at the Alushta Museum of History and Geology.

== Works ==
- Повесть о веселом сердце [The Tale of a Joyful Heart]. Simferopol: Krymizdat. 1960.
- Кто будет капитаном? [Who Will Be Captain?]. Simferopol: Krymizdat. 1961.
- Утро каждого дня [The Morning of Every Day]. Simferopol: Krymizdat. 1963.
- Рассказы о Крыме [Stories of Crimea]. Simferopol: Krymizdat. 1968.
- Если бы ты был моим сыном [If You Were My Son]. Simferopol: Tavriya. 1972.
- Ищу судьбу [Searching for Destiny]. Simferopol: Tavriya. 1974.
- Попытка старомодного романа [An Attempt at an Old-Fashioned Novel]. Simferopol. 1983.
- Сто рассказов о Крыме [One Hundred Stories About Crimea]. Simferopol. 1985.
