= Service (surname) =

Service is a surname. Notable people with the surname include:

- Elman Service (1915–1996), American anthropologist
- James Service (1823–1899), Australian politician
- James E. Service (1931–2017), American admiral
- John S. Service (1909–1999), American diplomat
- Robert Service (historian) (born 1947), British historian
- Robert W. Service (1874–1958), Canadian poet
- Scott Service (born 1967), American baseball player
- Tom Service (born 1976), British music journalist and radio and television presenter
