= Service contract =

Service contract may refer to:

- employment contract
- extended warranty
- Metropolitan Bus Service Contract
- Programmatic service contract in service-oriented architecture
  - standardized service contract - software design principle
- water service contract

== See also ==
- contract
- service (economics)
