= Underhand =

Underhand or underhanded may refer to:

== Music ==
- "Underhand", in the 1986 Throw a Sickie album by Tall Dwarfs
- "Underhand", in the 1974 Somethin's Happening album by Peter Frampton
- An underhand grip;
  - a type of traditional grip in drumming
  - a way of holding the bow when playing string instruments

== Sports ==
- Underhand chop, an event in a lumberjack competition
- Underhand grip in weightlifting
- Underhand pass in volleyball
- Underhand pitch (baseball), a less common type of pitch
- Underhand pitch (softball), the manner of pitching in softball
- Underhand serve (disambiguation), in several sports

== See also ==
- Underhanded C Contest
