= Abdulla Latif-zade =

Crimean Tatar poet, writer, and translator

- Abdulla Abil oğlu Lâtif-zade; Абдулла Абиль огълу Лятиф-заде
- Born: 26 August 1890; Simferopol, Russian Empire
- Died: 17 April 1938 (aged 47); Simferopol, Crimean ASSR, Russian SFSR, USSR
- Citizenship: Russian Empire; Soviet Union
- Occupation: linguist

Abdulla Latif-zade (Crimean Tatar: Abdulla Abil oğlu Lâtif-zade, Russian: Абдулла Абиль огълу Лятиф-заде; 26 August 1890 – 17 April 1938) was a Crimean Tatar literary critic, poet, writer, and translator who was executed during the purge of Crimean Tatar intellectuals in the Stalin era.

Born to a family of teachers in 1890, he attended a madrasah in Crimea and later studied in Istanbul before becoming a teacher himself. He taught in Yevpatoria and Simferopol. In 1917 he was elected as a delegate to the Qurultay of the Crimean Tatar People, and took part in the transliteration of the Crimean Tatar language to the Latin alphabet. After graduating from the State Academy of Art Studies in 1934 he taught Western European Literature at the Crimean Pedagogical Institute until he was dismissed for being "an ardent nationalist" on 21 March 1937 - his use on non-Russian loanwords having made some of his students uncomfortable. He was then arrested on 28 April that year on dubious charges of counter-revolutionary activity during a purge of Crimean Tatar intelligentsia and shot on 17 April 1938. He was posthumously rehabilitated on 15 August 1957, with the lack of corpus delicti being noted in the case. Many of his colleagues and friends, including Bekir Çoban-zade, were also victims of the Great Terror.
