= Mahmud Qırımlı =

Crimean Tatar poet

Mahmud Qırımlı (also known as Mahmud Qırımiy; Ukrainian: Махмуд Киримли, Turkish: Mahmud Kırımlı) was a late twelfth- to early thirteenth-century Crimean Tatar poet. He is thought to have been the author of the dastan Hikayet-i Yusuf ve Zuleyha ("Poem about Yusuf and Zulaykha"), which is considered the first literary work in the Crimean Tatar language. The biography of Mahmud himself is little researched: most studies focus on his poem.

== Editions ==
- Kırımlı Mahmud, Yusuf ile Züleyha, ed. by İsmail Hikmet Ertaylan (Istanbul: Edebiyat Fakültesi Basımevi, 1960)
- Махмуд Къырымлы, Юсуф ве Зулейха: тарихий дестан, ed. by Р. Фазыл and К. Къонъуратлы (Simferopol: Къы-рымдевокъувпеднешир, 2013)
