= Servitude =

Servitude may refer to:

== Persons ==
- Conscription
- Indentured servitude
- Involuntary servitude
- Penal servitude
- Service
- Service-oriented submission
- Slavery

== Property ==
- Servitude (Roman law)
- Equitable servitude, a term of real estate law
- Servitude in civil law, a kind of interest in property

== Music ==
- Servitude (album), a 2024 album by the Black Dahlia Murder
