= Ennan Alimov =

Crimean Tatar writer and artist

- Эннан Мемутович Алимов
- Born: Ennan Memutovich Alimov; 1912; Cheremisovka, Russian Empire
- Died: 1941 (aged 28–29); Donbas, Soviet Union
- Occupations: Writer and artist

Ennan Memutovich Alimov (Russian: Эннан Мемутович Алимов; 1912–1941) was a Crimean Tatar writer and artist.

== Biography ==
Ennan Alimov was born in 1912 to a Crimean Tatar family in the village of Cheremisovka, near Belogorsk (now Bilohirsk). After graduating from a nine-year rural school, he worked at a tobacco factory. In 1933, Alimov entered the art studio of Nikolay Samokish, graduating in 1936. After the studio was transformed into the Crimean Art School, Alimov served as its director from July 1938 to September 1941. Alimov left the studio to serve at the front after the invasion of the Soviet Union. He was killed in action in 1941 as a senior sergeant.

Alimov's original paintings did not survive. Reproductions of his paintings Bagydzhy kyzlar ("Girls-growers"), Ormanda tan ("Dawn in the forest"), and Kaytarma oynagyan kyz ("Girl dancing haitarma") were published between 1933 and 1936 in Yash Kuvet and Komsomolskaya Pravda.

Between 1936 and 1941, Alimov's stories "Native Village", "The Turtle Dove Flaps Her Wings" and "Fishermen" were published. The main character of the story "The Turtle Dove Flaps Her Wings" was based on his lover Emine Smedlyaeva and discussed the first love of a teenager with descriptions of her in comparison to rain and the colors of a forest. Alimov's poems "My Homeland" and "Meeting the Dawn" were published in the newspaper Literary Crimea.

== Literature ==
- Panova Z. S. Development of the genre of the story in the Crimean Tatar literature of the 30s. of the XX century (on the example of E. Alimov's story "The turtledove flaps its wing") // Uchenye zapiski Taurida National University im. V. I. Vernadsky. - 2013. - T. 26 (65), No. 1. - Part 1. - S. 192-195. — (Series "Philology. Social Communications").
- Veliulaeva A. Kyrymtatar edebiyaty: 6-nji son. - Akmesdzhit, 1998.
- "I will not forget anyone..." / Collection of works of Crimean Tatar writers 1913-1940. - Simferopol, 2001.
