= Mir-Hamza Efendiyev =

Azerbaijani diplomat (born 1950)

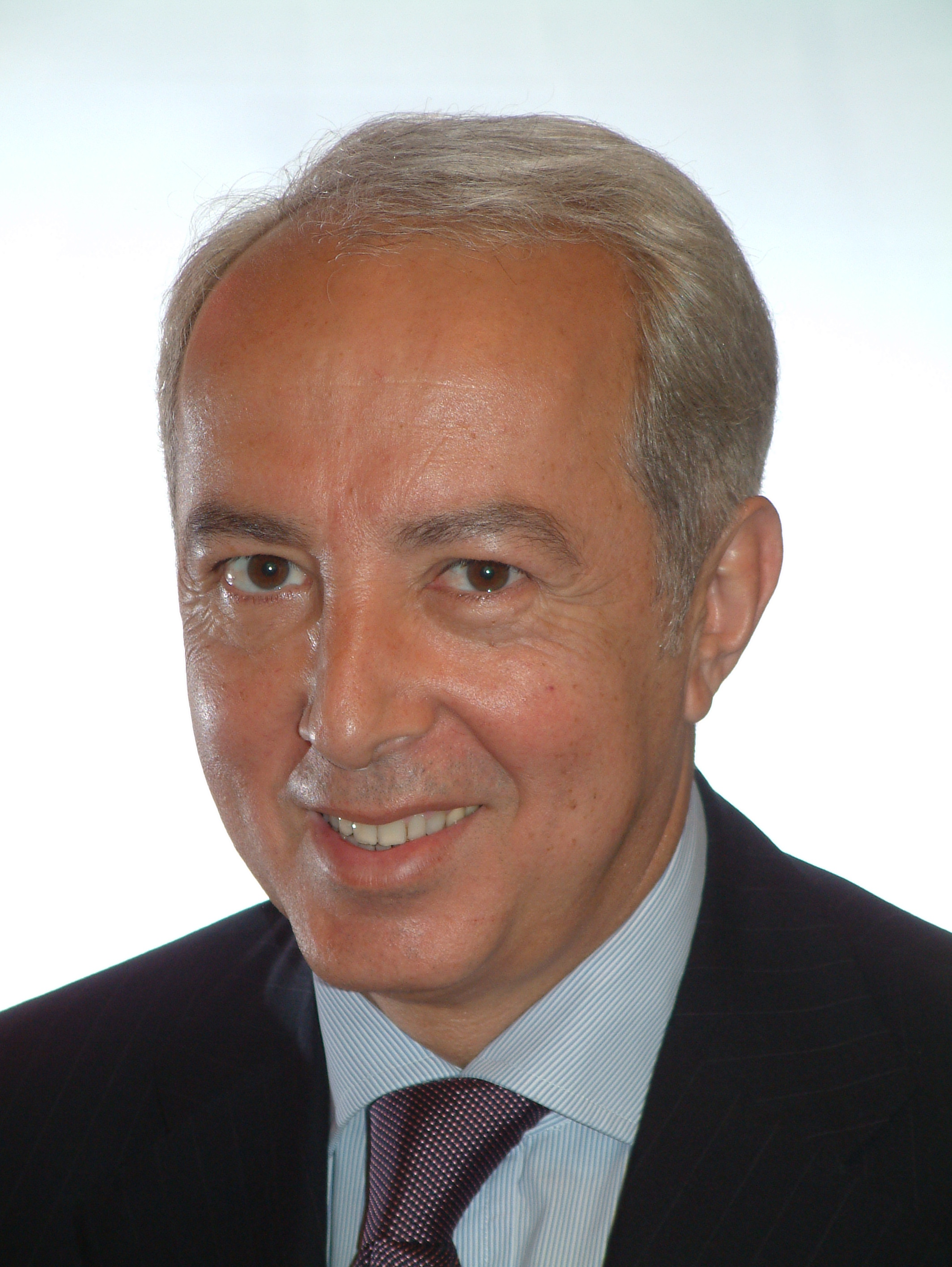

Ambassador Extraordinary and Plenipotentiary of the Republic of Azerbaijan
- President: Ilham Aliyev

Personal details
- Born: November 15, 1950 (age 75) Baku, Soviet Union (now Azerbaijan)

Mir-Hamza Efendiyev (Azerbaijani: Mir-Həmzə Əfəndiyev, (born on November 15, 1950, Baku), is an Ambassador of the Republic of Azerbaijan. He was granted a diplomatic rank of Ambassador Extraordinary and Plenipotentiary on April 9, 1995. From September 25, 2012, to December 15, 2016, he served as an Ambassador of the Republic of Azerbaijan in the Kingdom of the Netherlands and from October 31, 2012, to December 15, 2016, as the Permanent Representative to OPCW. Preceding this, he has also held several posts in Brussels, including Head of Mission of the Republic of Azerbaijan to NATO from May 13, 1998, to July 15, 2004, Head of Mission of the Republic of Azerbaijan to the European Union from August 27, 1996, to 2000, Ambassador of the Republic of Azerbaijan to the Kingdom of Belgium from April 9, 1995, to July 15, 2004. He was appointed as a Permanent Representative to the OPCW from May 9, 2000, to July 15, 2004. From July 15, 2004–22 October 2009 he served as an Ambassador of Azerbaijan in Greece.

== Early life and political activity ==
In 1990 he was elected as Member of Parliament (Supreme Soviet) of Azerbaijan SSR. He was one of 258 MP's who voted the passing of a law on" Restoration of Independence of Azerbaijan" on October 18, 1991. He was elected member of Parliamentary (National Assembly) Commission on Foreign Affairs as well as member of Legal and Political Committee of the Parliamentary assembly of the Black Sea Economic Cooperation.

== Diplomatic career ==
On July 15t, 2004, following the Order of the President of the Republic of Azerbaijan Ilham Aliyev, Mir-Hamza Efendiyev was appointed Ambassador of the Republic of Azerbaijan to the Hellenic Republic.

Following the Order of the President dated September 25, 2012, Efendiyev was appointed Ambassador of the Republic of Azerbaijan to the Kingdom of the Netherlands.
