= Osman Aqçoqraqlı =

Crimean Tatar writer, journalist, historian, archaeologist, ethnographer, and teacher

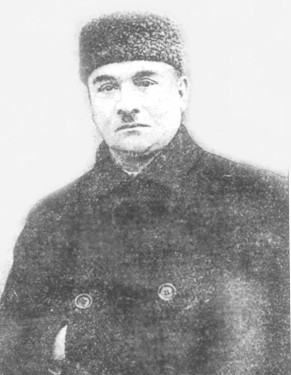
- Born: 15 January 1879; Bakhchysarai, Russian Empire (now Crimea)
- Died: 17 April 1938 (aged 59); Simferopol, Crimean ASSR, Russian SFSR, Soviet Union (now Crimea)

Osman Nuri-Asan oğlu Aqçoqraqlı (15 January [O.S. 3 January] 1879 – 17 April 1938), also written as Aqchoqraqli or Akchokrakli, was a Crimean Tatar writer, journalist, historian, archaeologist, ethnographer, and teacher.

== Early life ==
Osman Nuri-Asan oğlu Aqçoqraqlı was born in the city of Bakhchysarai into the family of an Arabic script calligrapher on 15 January 1879. He received his primary education at the Zincirli Madrasa, before later studying at the Daoud Pasha gymnasium in Istanbul from 1894 to 1896. In 1908, he moved to Cairo and began taking private lessons on eastern history, Arabic literature, and archaeology from Al-Azhar University. When questioned by universities, he would modestly refer to his education credentials as being incomplete secondary education. However, this did not prevent universities from hiring him.

== Career ==
Aqçoqraqlı began his career in Saint Petersburg, teaching calligraphy at the Oriental Faculty of Saint Petersburg State University. He also participated in the decoration of mosques throughout Bakhchysarai and Saint Petersburg with ornaments and Quranic verses. From 1896 to 1900, he also worked as a proof-reader and typesetter in the publishing house of İlyas Borağanskiy, his mentor. Aqçoqraqlı was later placed in charge of translating Russian literary works into the Crimean Tatar language, among them The Fountain of Bakhchisaray, Marriage, and the fables of Ivan Krylov.

From 1901 to 1905, Aqçoqraqlı served in the Imperial Russian Army. From 1906, he worked at various Tatar newspapers and magazines, among them Ulfet in Saint Petersburg and Shura in Orenburg.

Like many other Crimean Tatar intellectuals, Aqçoqraqlı took inspiration from Ismail Gasprinsky, and worked in the editorial office of Gasprinsky's Terciman twice, in 1906 and from 1910 to 1916. At Terciman, Aqçoqraqlı combined his journalistic skills with knowledge from his education at the Zincirli Madrasa. He also was involved in Bakhchysarai's local life, serving as one of two directors of the city's mutual credit society, and as treasurer of the Bakhchysarai Library Society. From 1913 to 1916, he also studied Russian calligraphy at the A. Cossodo Institute in Odessa. Later, in 1921, the Ismail Gasprinsky House Museum would be established at his behest, in the house where Terciman was printed.

In 1917, Aqçoqraqlı was elected as a member of the Kurultai of the short-lived Crimean People's Republic. He taught Turkish and Oriental calligraphy, Crimean Tatar folklore, and Crimean Tatar ethnography at the Taurida National V.I. Vernadsky University and Crimean Tatar Pedagogical Institute. He also occasionally lectured at Kyiv and Kharkiv universities. In this time, he became a friend of Pavlo Tychyna and Ahatanhel Krymsky. He was also academic secretary of the Bakhchysarai Historical, Cultural and Archaeological Museum-Reserve in the Bakhchisaray Palace.

In 1923, Aqçoqraqlı was elected as a member of the Taurida Society of History, Archaeology and Ethnography. From 1930 to 1931, he served as its secretary, being the last to hold that role before the organisation's dissolution. In 1925, alongside Üsein Bodaninsky, Aqçoqraqlı discovered a 17th-century manuscript of Jan-Muhammed's dastan Tugay Bey in the village of Kapsikhor (now Morske), a then-lost work fabled to be among the best works of Crimean Tatar literature. He collected and described about 400 Crimean Tatar tamgas and studied numerous epigraphs in Crimea dating back to the Middle Ages. In 1926, he attended the First All-Union Turkological Congress in Baku.

== Death ==
In the early 1930s, Aqçoqraqlı began to be persecuted by the Soviet authorities on charges of "nationalism," leading to his firing from the Crimean Tatar Pedagogical Institute in 1934. After his firing, he taught geography for some time at a Komsomol school before moving in with his sister in Baku. However, his time in Baku would be short-lived; on 5 April 1937, he was arrested by the NKVD and charged with "participation in a nationalist counter-revolutionary organisation," (stated to be the Crimean Tatar party Milliy Firqa), as well as espionage. He was put before a show trial conducted by the Military Collegium of the Supreme Court of the Soviet Union. On 17 April 1938, he was found guilty and sentenced to death, being shot on the same day.
