= Server Trupçu =

Soviet Crimean Tatar politician

2nd Secretary of the Crimean Regional Committee of the VKP(b)
- In office 1937 – September 1937

Personal details
- Born: 1908 Dereköy, Russian Empire (now Ushchelne, Crimea)
- Died: 17 April 1938 (aged 29-30) Simferopol, Crimean ASSR, Russian SFSR, Soviet Union (now Crimea)
- Party: VKP(b) (1928–1938)

Server Qurtseit Trupçu (c. 1908 – 17 April 1938) was a Soviet Crimean Tatar politician who served as Secretary of the Crimean Regional Committee of the All-Union Communist Party (Bolshevik) and a NKVD troika for a few months in 1937 before he was arrested and executed as part of the Great Purge.

== Biography ==
Server Qurtseit Trupçu was born around 1908, in the Crimean village of Dereköy (now Ushchelne). From 1919 to 1924, he worked as a labourer, including as a cattle herder and orphanage worker around the Yalta area. In 1924, he joined the Komsomol.

From 1926 to 1927, Trupçu worked as an instructor and organiser of the Komsomol district committee in Yalta. In 1928, he joined the All-Union Communist Party (Bolshevik). Afterwards, he continued to work as an instructor and organiser of the Komsomol, but moved to the cities of Sevastopol and Simferopol.

In 1931, Trupçu was placed in charge of the Personnel Department of the Crimean Regional Committee. From 1932 to 1934, he studied at the Institute of Red Professors in Moscow, and then taught at the institute for three years.

In 1937, Trupçu was chosen as Secretary of the Crimean Regional Committee. In this time, he was also part of an NKVD troika, and an active participant in the Great Purge, as well as the advancement of Crimean culture (for example, the Crimean State Opera and Ballet Theatre).

In September 1937, however, Trupçu was removed from office. Two months later, he was arrested. On 5 March 1938, he was sentenced to death by the Military Collegium of the Supreme Court of the Soviet Union. On 17 April 1938, he was executed in Simferopol.

On 22 March 1958, he was rehabilitated due to a lack of corpus delicti.

== Family ==
Trupçu's sister was Cumazie Trupçu, a Crimean Tatar singer and actress who was deported to Uzbekistan in 1944.
