= Şevqiy Bektöre =

Crimean Tatar poet, educator, and activist (1888–1961)

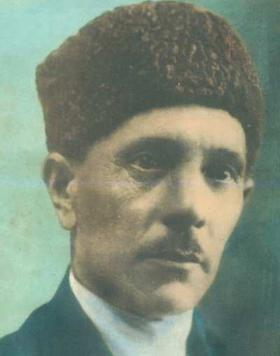
- Bektöre in 1926
- Born: 1888; Kavaklar, Constanța County, Kingdom of Romania
- Died: 18 December 1961 (aged 72–73); Istanbul, Turkey
- Occupations: Poet, educator, academic, activist
- Spouse: Hamide
- Writing career
- Language: Crimean Tatar language
- Period: 20th century

Şevqiy Bektöre (Crimean Tatar Cyrillic: Шевкъий Бектёре, Dobrujan Tatar: Şewkiy Bektóre, Turkish: Şevki Bektöre, sometimes anglicized as Shewkiy Bektore or Shevki Bektore; 1888 – December 18, 1961) was a Dobrujan-born Crimean Tatar poet, publisher, educator, academic, and activist for ethnic Crimean Tatar causes.

He created the first Arabic script alphabet modified specifically for Crimean Tatars and authored Crimean Tatar and Turkmen language textbooks. He served in Crimea, Caucasus, and Central Asia, and spent much of his adult life in Joseph Stalin’s gulags.

== Biography ==
Şevqiy Bektöre was born in 1888 in Kavaklar, today officially known as Chirnogeni, a village situated in the Crimean Tatar countryside west of Mangalia, in Dobruja. At the time, the region was part of the Kingdom of Romania; from 1420 to 1878, it was part of the Ottoman Empire. His parents were prosperous farmers hailing from Crimea. As a result of the Russo-Turkish War (1768–74) followed by the loss of Crimea to the Russians in 1783, in the early 19th century consecutive waves of threatened Crimean Tatars left their properties and fled to the Ottoman Empire. Some of them settled in Dobruja, but by the time Bektöre was born, the region had been annexed by the Kingdom of Romania, following the conclusion of the Russo-Turkish War of 1877–1878. When Bektöre was 6 years old, his father, who was also a schoolteacher and the governor of township, convinced many of his fellow villagers to move further inland to Anatolia, Turkey. They settled in Central Anatolia, 50 miles (80 km) west of Ankara, near Polatlı on the road to Eskişehir, naming their village Karakaya.

Bektöre completed his elementary school in Karakaya and his secondary education in the neighboring town of Haymana. Then, at the age of 17, he went to Istanbul for his higher education entering the Divinity Faculty of the Istanbul University where he met students of Crimean descent and acted in the Crimean Students Association in Istanbul.

In 1909 he took his first trip to Crimea, which was part of Russia, where he looked for his lost relatives and made folklore and ethnographic studies.

In 1912, he participated in the First Balkan War.

At the beginning of World War I in 1914, when the Ottoman Empire was again at war with Russia, Bektöre was teaching in Crimea. He escaped the war, fleeing to Turkey via Azerbaijan and Iran.

In early 1918, Bektöre was serving in Istanbul as General Secretary of the Society of Active Youth consisting of Turks of Crimean descent. In March, when the warfare ended, he sailed to Sevastopol and Feodosia with the delegation of the Red Crescent charged with the prisoner exchange. While there, he learned news unknown outside of Crimea realizing what the Bolshevik Revolution produced. He also learned that in December 1917 Tatars refused to recognize the legitimacy of the Bolsheviks, and, on 23 February 1918, a firing squad of the Black Sea Fleet executed their elected President, Noman Çelebicihan. Their Minister of Defense and Foreign Affairs, Cafer Seydamet Qırımer, escaped with his wife through Caucasus.

Later that year, Bektöre, Cafer Seydamet Qırımer, and a small group of Crimean Tatar patriots living in Istanbul traveled to Crimea on a gunboat to join the struggle for independence. Bektöre became a member of the Crimean National Board of Education. By the end of the year he managed to recruit from Turkey more than fifty teachers. This time, when he arrived in Crimea, he also had at his side Hamide, his young and supporting wife.

The Bektöre family settled in the village of Quru Özen (now Soniachnehirske), near Alushta, 50 kilometres (31 mi) northeast of Yalta. The village had no school and Bektöre set out to open one. He extensively wrote poems which had nationalistic tones:

My Tatars and my birthplace,

My childhood's cherished times,
Unceasingly I yearn for,
Excruciating rhymes.

In Quru Özen, he founded and distributed Şar-şur, a journal that was written by hand, and he got children to learn and recite his poems, including Tatarlığım (lit. 'My Tatarland' or 'My Tatarness'), Aqqım içün (lit. 'For My Freedom',) and Ayt, Çatırtav (lit. 'Tell Me, Virgin Mountain').

In 1920, he published in Aqmescit (Simferopol) his first poetry collection, Ergenekon. To publish the book he used a printing press in an abandoned building. He found an old type setter and together they were able to retrofit the equipment. He personally distributed the books in towns and villages. Then he did the same thing with his collections that followed. In the end, his poems and writings were widely read and known throughout Crimea.

In November 1920, the Bolsheviks took over Crimea and on 18 October 1921, they authorized the establishment of the Crimean Autonomous Soviet Socialist Republic, which was annexed to the Russian Soviet Federative Socialist Republic.

During the 1920-1921 famine, he was a teacher at the Crimean Tatar Pedagogical Institute in Totayköy (now Fersmanove), Crimea.

In 1924, due to the increased determination of the Soviet authorities to liquidate national ambitions, he left Crimea for Dagestan where he was to be a teacher of languages in the Pedagogical Institute in the city of Temir-Khan-Shura (now called Buynaksk).

In 1926, he participated as a delegate from Dagestan in the All-Union Turcological Congress in Baku, Azerbaijan, where the replacement of Arabic script in Turkic-Islamic lands by Latin alphabet was adopted. In addition, the adoption of a common grammar by the Turkic Soviet Republics was discussed.

For a short period he was a teacher in the town of Batalpasha in Karachay-Cherkessia. In 1927 he moved to Ashgabat, the capital of Turkmenistan, where he taught at the Turkmen Teachers School.

On 25 March 1932 he was arrested by the State Political Directorate, or GPU, of the NKVD (the precursor of KGB) on charge of "belonging to the secret Turkmen Nationalist Organization." He was sentenced to 10 years and imprisoned in the agricultural labor camps in Uzbekistan, first in Zarafshan and later in Zengi-Ata near Tashkent. Hoping to join them after his release in 1943, he convinced his wife Hamide, then living in Tashkent, to take their three children and move to her relatives in Istanbul. But he was released only after the war in 1948. He settled in Yangiyul, Uzbekistan and he started to write letters to the authorities requesting a passport. On 17 December 1948, he was rearrested on charge of "being a dangerous person" and exiled for life to the town of Bolshaya Murta on the Yenisey river north of Krasnoyarsk, Siberia. In Bolshaya Murta, he worked as watchman in a brick cooperative. Later, he herded horses and cows and became a basket weaver.

Some years after Stalin's death in 1953, he was released by Nikita Khrushchev and in October 1956 he was able to join his family in Turkey, after a confinement and exile for 24 years.

In 1960, he was elected as head of the Crimean Tatar National Center in Turkey.

Bektöre died on 18 December 1961 in Istanbul. He was buried at Adrianopole Gate, outside of the western walls of old Constantinople. His memoirs were recorded by Saadet Bektöre and published by Eroğlu Matbaası in 1965, under the title Red Flows the Volga (Crimean Tatar: Volga kızıl akarken).

== Writings ==
| 1917 | Debut poem Şilem in Türk yurdu Journal, Turkey |
| 1918–1919 | Şar-şur Journal. Kurî Ózen, Crimea |
| 1920 | Ergenekon (poetry collection). Ak-Mesğit (Simferopol, Crimea) |
| 1923 | Tatarğa sarf we nahib (Tatar Grammar). Totay-Kóy, Crimea |
| 1925 | Tatar elfibesi (Tatar Alphabet). Ak-Mesğit (Simferopol, Crimea) |
| 1927 | Türkmen Dili (Turkmen Language). Ashgabat, Turkmenistan |

== Citations ==
=== Sources ===
- Anaurt. "Шевкъий Бекторе". anaurt (in Crimean Tatar (Cyrillic script)). anaurt.com.
- Allworth, Edward, ed. (1998). The Tatars of Crimea: Return to the Homeland: Studies and Documents. Durham, NC: Duke University Press. pp. 71, 77–79, 343. ISBN 978-0-8223-1985-6.
- Bektöre, Saadet (1965). Volga kızıl akarken (in Turkish). Ankara: Eroğlu Matbaası.
- Bektöre, Atilla (2007). A Nomad's Journey: A Memoir. Lincoln, NE: iUniverse. ISBN 978-0-5953-8524-9.
- Bektöre, Atilla (16 March 2005). "Shevki Bektöre (1888-1961)". ICC. International Committee for Crimea.
- Bektóre, Şewkiy (February 2012). "Tatarlîgîm". Nazar Look (in Crimean Tatar) (14): 17.
- Bektóre, Şewkiy (April 2011). "Ayt, Şatîrtaw". Nazar Look (in Crimean Tatar) (4): 19.
- Bowman, Inci. "Book Notice". ICC. International Committee for Crimea.
- Tabaq, Dilyara; Nariman, Nara (1 October 2009). "Atilla Bektore's "A Nomad's Journey" is published in USA". QHA. QHA.
- Aydın, Filiz Tutku (September 2000). A Case in Diaspora Nationalism: Crimean Tatars in Turkey - A Master's Thesis. Ankara: Department of Political Science and Public Administration, Bilkent University. pp. 56, 70–71.
- Murat, Taner (2012). Opening the Doors of Science. Iaşi: StudIS. pp. 80–81. ISBN 978-6-0662-4294-3.
- Murat, Taner, ed. (2013). Metric Conversions/Мэтрэлі кайтармалар (in English and Crimean Tatar). Charleston, SC: CreateSpace. p. 34. ISBN 978-1-4944-4144-9.
- Murat, Taner, ed. (2014). Perúzelí salînğak/Leagănul cu peruzea (in Crimean Tatar and Romanian). Charleston, SC: CreateSpace. pp. 24–27. ISBN 978-1-4993-8689-9.
- Sakarya, Ercan. "Gurbet mektupları". Kalgay (in Turkish) (30).
