= Bekir Choban-zade =

Crimean Tatar poet and Turkologist

Bekir Vaap oğlu Çoban-zade
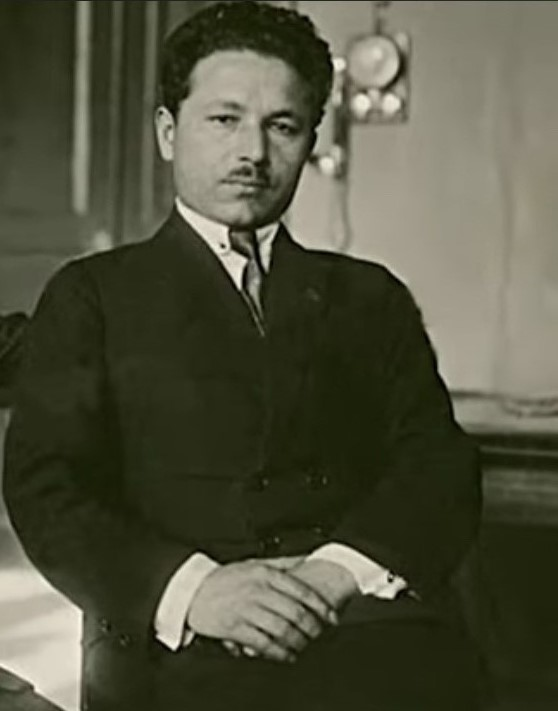
- Born: 27 May [O.S. 15 May] 1893; Qarasuvbazar
- Died: 13 October 1937 (aged 44); Baku
- Education: University of Budapest

Bekir Vaap oğlu Çoban-zade (pronounced [tʃobanzade], 27 May [O.S. 15 May] 1893 – 13 October 1937) was a prominent Crimean Tatar poet and professor of Turkic languages who was one of the victims of the Great Purge.

In the midst of a successful academic career, at the age of 44, Çoban-zade was arrested by Soviet authorities for alleged subversive activities against the state and was sentenced to death. His writings have outlived him; his poetry, in particular, continues to enjoy popularity among Crimean Tatars.

Çoban-zade was the first professor in the Soviet East in his specialty, who read the first lectures in the native languages of the peoples of these countries, was the first to develop university courses in his specialty. During the entire period of his scientific activity, he wrote approximately one hundred and fifty scientific works, of which at least one hundred were the first attempts to scientifically substantiate the problems of the Azerbaijani language and literature in the Azerbaijani language. Most of these works have not lost their scientific significance to this day. He trained hundreds of linguists and literary scholars, and among his students there were dozens of highly qualified scientific workers — associate professors and assistants, who have proven themselves with their scientific works outside the country.

== Biography ==
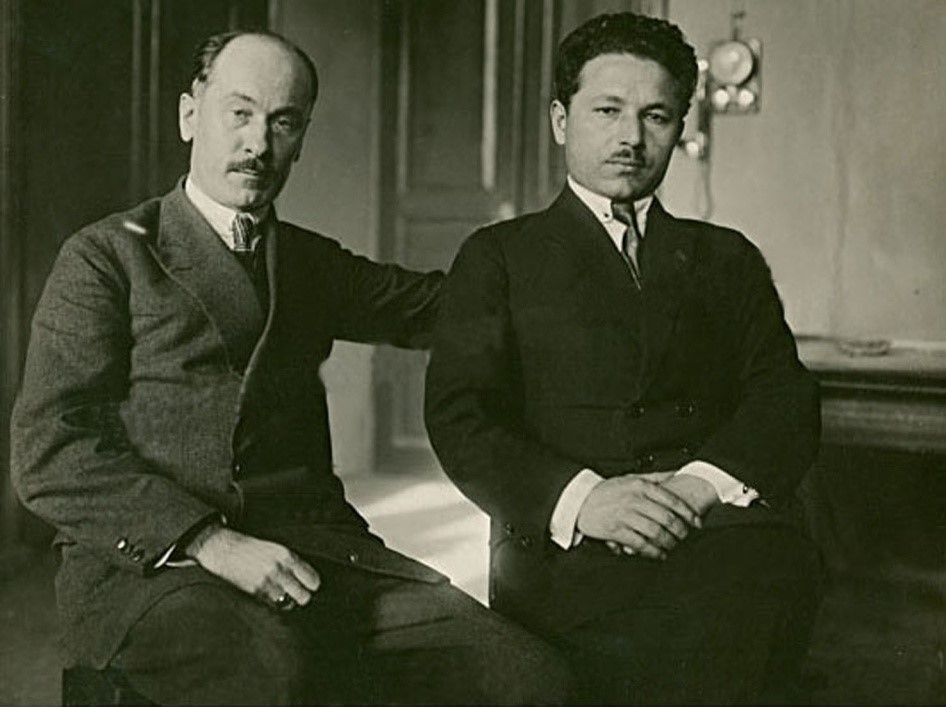
Gyula Mészáros and Bekir Çoban-zade in Baku in 1926

Çoban-zade was born in a family of humble origins in the village near Qarasubazar, Crimea. His father was a shepherd ("çoban" in Crimean Tatar), and his last name means 'son of shepherd'. As a young boy, he helped his father herd the sheep, and these early experiences in the countryside left a lasting impression on the sensitive boy. Many of his poems are replete with descriptions of Crimean pastoral scenes. He received his early education in Crimea and Istanbul. In 1916, he went to Budapest to enroll at the Pázmány Péter Catholic University and received his Ph.D. in 1919. After he returned to Crimea, he taught Crimean Tatar language and literature at the Crimean Tatar Pedagogical Institute in Simferopol (Aqmescit) and later accepted the chair of Turkology at the Crimean University (now known as Taurida National University) in 1922. Early in 1925, he moved to Azerbaijan to become professor of Turkology at the Baku State University. He had a remarkable facility with languages.

In January 1937, Çoban-zade was placed on leave without pay by an order of the Soviet Academy of Sciences and subsequently arrested. During a 20-minute trial, he was found guilty and condemned to death. He was executed on October 13, 1937. Twenty years after his death, in response to an appeal from Çobanzade's wife, a military court of the USSR reversed the decision against him. The court declared that the charges against Çoban-zade were baseless.

== See also ==
- Crimean Tatars
- Crimean Tatar language
- List of Crimean Tatars
