= Mustafa Selimov =

Soviet Crimean Tatar politician, partisan, and civil rights activist

- Born: 21 March 1910; Kökköz, Russian Empire (now Sokolyne, Crimea)
- Died: 14 October 1985 (aged 75); Moscow, Russian SFSR, Soviet Union (now Russia)
- Military career
- Allegiance: Soviet Union
- Branch: Red Army
- Conflicts: World War II; Eastern Front; Crimean resistance
- Awards: Medal "For Labour Valour"

Mustafa Veis oğlu Selimov (Russian: Мустафа Веисович Селимов, romanized: Mustafa Veisovich Selimov; 21 March 1910 – 14 October 1985) was a Crimean Tatar communist leader, partisan, and civil rights activist. Having been the First Secretary of the Yalta Communist Party before the war, he served as the commissar of a partisan formation during the war before being exiled the Uzbek SSR as a Crimean Tatar, where he went on to hold leadership positions in the Ministry of Agriculture of the Uzbek SSR and become one of the original organizers of the Crimean Tatar civil rights movement, for which he received reprimand from party organs.

== Early life ==
Selimov was born on 21 March 1910 in Kökköz (since renamed Sokolinoye), where he initially attended school. Having been orphaned at the age of eleven, he went on to join the Komsomol when he was fifteen. In Bakhchisarai he headed a regional library before completing school and becoming a member of the Communist Party in 1931. He then returned to his native village, where he became secretary of the village council and deputy chairman of a collective farm. However, he was soon made manager of the Bakhchisarai District Party Committee, where he remained until 1935 before attending additional training and moving on to be a political instructor there in 1936. From 1937 to May 1939 he served as secretary of the Komsomol committee, from then to September he headed the district land department before being drafted into the Red Army later that month. He briefly attended training to be a political instructor, likely in preparation for the Soviet-Finnish War, before returning to Crimea. Having been posted to the personnel department of the Bakhchisarai Regional Party Committee upon his return, he soon became the 1st Secretary of the Yalta District Party Committee in February 1940.

== World War II ==
After the German invasion of the Soviet Union, Selimov volunteered to enlist in the Red Army for the front, but was ordered to stay in the rear with the Crimean Regional Committee and was initially appointed commissar of the 4th partisan region. However, he was soon evacuated to Sevastopol and later the Caucasus with other senior party members. There, he worked in the political department of the Transcaucasian railway before returning to Crimea in January 1942 to take part in the Kerch-Feodosia landing and the subsequent liberation of Kerch.

In May 1942 he was stationed in Krasnodar with troops set to retreat to Sochi, and in June 1943 he was airdropped into the Crimean forest with other personnel from the mainland to provide reinforcements to the Crimean partisans. There, he served as the commissar of the 1st partisan detachment under the command of Mikhail Makedonsky. There, Selimov helped establish contact with other communists, conducted counter-propaganda efforts, and organized partisan cells in various Crimean villages. In his notes, he remembered various Crimean Tatars such as Memet Appazov, Asan Mamutov, Vaap Dzhemilev, and Seitamet Islyamov were accomplished partisans.

He briefly served from November 1943 to January 1943 as commissar of the 4th Partisan Brigade, which contained six detachments and over 500 fellow Crimean Tatar partisans, including his sister Fatime. On 29 January 1944 the partisan movement in Crimea was reorganized, with 4th, 6th, and 7th Partisan Brigades being united into the Southern Formation of Crimean partisans, with Makedonsky appointed as commander and Selimov as commissar; the formation was based in the forested area of southern Crimea near Chatyr-Dag.

On 14 April 1944 the 6th Brigade of the formation began an offensive to retake the Bakhchysarai railway station, while other detachments blocked other stations and advanced north towards Simferopol. Detachments of the 7th Brigade went after retreating enemy forces in the Belbek valley area, and then participated in the liberation of Yalta.

== Exile ==
Despite his high position in the regional government and service to the Soviet Union during the war, Selimov was subject to deportation from Crimea as a Crimean Tatar on 18 May 1944. Initially he lived in Bekabad, and in April 1945 he became director of the Central Asian branch of the All-Union Research Institute of Wine and Viticulture. He then held various other posts at agricultural institutions in the Uzbek SSR, initially working at the All-Union institute of Plant Growing before serving as deputy director of the Union Cotton Growing Scientific Research Institute from 1955 to 1959, after which he worked as the deputy president of the Academy of Agricultural Sciences of the Uzbek SSR until 1961. After being deputy head of the main directorate of science in the Ministry of Agriculture of the Uzbek SSR from 1961 to 1963 he headed a department of the State Committee for Cotton Growing in Central Asia until 1966, after which he worked as deputy director of Uzgiprovodkhoz until retiring in 1975. In addition to his work he contributed to the newspaper Lenin Bayrağı, writing about Crimean Tatar war heroes he knew.

He died in a Moscow hospital on 14 October 1975 and was buried in Tashkent. Although he was offered a chance to individually return to Crimea later in life, he refused the idea of moving to Crimea when other Crimean Tatar exiles were not allowed to. As one of the leaders at the forefront of the original Crimean Tatar rights movement, in spring 1957 he and various other prominent Crimean Tatar veterans including Amet-khan Sultan, Refat Mustafaev, and Bekir Osmanov co-signed a petition to Khrushchev demanding rehabilitation and right of return for the Crimean Tatar people. The letter turned out to be the first significant mass petition in the following wave of the petition campaign phase of the Crimean Tatar civil rights movement.

Later that year in August he and Dzhebbar Akimov organized a delegation of prominent and respected Crimean Tatar members of the Communist Party to Moscow in hopes of swaying Soviet leaders to give Crimean Tatars the same right of return that other deported peoples had, but their efforts at the time were in vain. The government subsequently summoned him and other Crimean Tatar social leaders, demanding that they stop "inciting autonomist sentiments among immigrants from Crimea" in exile; Selimov himself was severely reprimanded by the party for his activities and threatened with being expelled from the party.

Nevertheless, he returned to Crimean Tatar rights work in 1964, heading a delegation to Moscow that year. A January 1967 document produced by the Central Committee of the Communist Party of the Uzbek SSR put him at the top of the list they compiled titled "The list of the most active supporters of the idea of returning the Tatars to Crimea and granting them national autonomy". Later on in the 1970s when the government was promoting the Mubarek zone as a "final solution for the Tatar question", he categorically refused to support it, saying that the only solution to the Crimean Tatar national question was in a return to Crimea. Despite attempts by the KGB to have him expelled from the party, he managed to remain a party member his whole life, largely due to the support of comrades.

== See also ==
- Bekir Osmanov
- Yuri Osmanov
- Dzhebbar Akimov
