= Bekir Osmanov =

Soviet partisan, agronomist, and Crimean Tatar activist

- Born: 22 March 1911; Büyük Özenbaş, Yaltinsky Uyezd, Taurida Governorate, Russian Empire (now Shchaslyve, Bakhchysarai Raion, AR Crimea, Ukraine)
- Died: 26 May 1983 (aged 72); Dmytrove, Simferopol Raion, Crimean Oblast, Ukrainian SSR, USSR
- Citizenship: Russian Empire → USSR
- Children: Yuri Osmanov

Bekir Osmanov (Russian: Бекир Османов; 22 March 1911 – 26 May 1983) was a Crimean Tatar civil rights activist, agronomist, and partisan. He was the father of Crimean Tatar leader Yuri Osmanov.

== Early life ==
Osmanov was born in Crimea, on 22 March 1911, in Buyuk Ozenbash village. His father, who was a teacher at a local madrasa, died in 1915, leaving their mother, Khaniapte, a widow with five children to raise. Growing up in extreme poverty, the children began working from a very young age, processing coal and tending to crops. When he was six to seven years old, he suffered from smallpox with a prolonged high fever, and was not expected to survive, but lived through it. He grew up to be a studious child, and eventually, his family sent him to Yalta to attend agricultural school. In 1935, he married fellow student Mariya Gushchinskaya, a Belarusian. During the purges of 1937, Osmanov, by then a tobacco farmer, was arrested and tried for rebutting Lysenkoist pseudoscience, but the court spared him after the judge issued a statement that legal action was an inappropriate way to handle academic disputes. Before the war, his wife gave birth to their daughter Tamila and first son Yuri; for their safety, they were evacuated from the peninsula to Azerbaijan before German troops completely took over the peninsula.

== Partisan activities ==
Growing wary of the imminent German occupation of Crimea, Osmanov insisted that collective farmers in Crimea harvest their crops early and prepare to defend themselves for the ensuing war, but was berated by a local official for sharing his sober analysis of the situation. He then attended brief combat training courses in which he learned to accurately fire a revolver and throw grenades. However, he was not drafted into the Red Army for health reasons, so he put his skills to use as a scout with the partisan movement to help resist the Nazi occupation of the peninsula. His first mission was to deliver a radio to a group of partisans deep within the forest. He went on to participate in other various partisan operations, for which he gained a reputation as a skilled scout due to his knowledge of the local geography, and in January 1942, he was accepted into the Community Party. For his effective work as a partisan and scout, the Nazi occupiers launched a wide search for him and offered a bounty of 100,000 marks on his head. He was twice nominated for the Order of Lenin, but Vladimir Bulatov obstructed the award on both occasions. With Kuibyshev detachment having suffered heavy losses and unable to continue, he was transferred to the Sevastopol detachment, where he became a political instructor and took part in more risky operations. In October 1942, he took part in a small-scale sea-based operation, helping fellow partisans hide in "blind spots" from enemy forces to approach the coast. However, the operation was a failure, with the commander and commissar panicking upon the start of enemy fire and several partisans drowning due to their boats being shelled. Nevertheless, Osmanov and the rest of the partisans maintained their composure and continued for Cape Kikeneiz, where they landed and made their way to the forest. However, his work as a partisan did not last much longer; later that month he sustained severe shrapnel wounds from a mine, and so he was evacuated from Crimea on 26 October 1942.

== Later life ==
Originally taken to Sochi, he was soon transferred to a hospital in Sukhumi, where he remained until reuniting with his family in Aghdam. He then moved to Krasnodar, where the Crimean Regional Committee in exile was located, before returning to Crimea as soon as Nazi forces were expelled from the peninsula in April 1944. Upon return to Crimea, he was appointed first deputy commissar of regional agriculture and started to draw up a plan for the development of local agriculture in the war-torn peninsula. He did not remain in Crimea for very long; since he was a Crimean Tatar, he was deported from Crimea on 18 May 1944 and sent to Central Asia. Initially, he was sent to the Pakhta Uchun Kurash collective farm, but he was allowed to move to a state farm in Ferghana, where his wife and children were deported to. In exile, he worked in agriculture, eventually getting a job at a nursery, where he developed several pear varieties.

=== Slander from Vergasov ===
Ilya Vergasov, a Russian writer controversial for taking extreme creative liberties in his memoirs, falsely depicted Osmanov as a German spy that was eventually shot for treason in one of the early editions of his book In the Mountains of Tavria; Osmanov had faithfully served the partisan movement and been evacuated from Crimea for medical reasons in 1942. Soon after the book's publication, he became aware of the slanderous depiction of him in the book and publicly rebuked it. Eventually, many of Vergasov's outlandish claims and contradictions became the subject of closer scrutiny, resulting in the slanderous fabrications being removed in later editions published after the content of the books was scrutinized by the central committee and other Crimean partisans who noticed Vergasov's lies.

=== Crimean Tatar rights activism ===
With a secure job and a reputation as a respected agronomist and war veteran, he became an active campaigner for Crimean Tatar civil rights and one of the co-founders of the original movement, frequently meeting with other prominent Crimean Tatars in exile including Mustafa Selimov and Dzhebbar Akimov to discuss the issue. Despite his strong communist beliefs, he was eventually expelled from the Communist Party in 1966 for a letter to Brezhnev highlighting the Crimean Tatar plight and outlining the proper Leninist recourse in the form of permitting the right of return to previous places of residence in Crimea, restoration of the Crimean ASSR, political rehabilitation of the Crimean Tatar nation, reparations, among other reconciliatory measures. In that era, such attitudes and activism were highly frowned upon by the party, which pursued a policy of demanding that "People of Tatar nationality who formerly lived in Crimea" remain in Asia instead of desiring a return to Crimea, much to the discontent of the majority of Crimean Tatars. His son Yuri Osmanov followed in his footsteps and became a prominent leader of the Crimean Tatar civil rights movement in later years.

=== Return to Crimea ===
After his wife Mariya died in 1974, Bekir Osmanov decided to return to Crimea and face the barrage of challenges in doing so. Her funeral was attended by many Crimean Tatars in diaspora, some of whom even travelled from Nukus to pay their respects in the ceremony in Fergana. Upon his return to Crimea, he obtained a house in Dmitrovo, but initially, he was denied a residence permit, a major barrier to the right of return for exiled Crimean Tatars. Only after living in Crimea illegally for a year and a half was he granted a residence permit. He lived there for the remainder of his life and suffered from quite poor health for those years before he eventually died on 26 May 1983, shortly after his son Yuri was sentenced to three years in prison for activism. After he died, authorities approached his other son Artyom, offering to help pay for the funeral if they kept it small; Artyom rejected the proposal, the family held a huge funeral attended by many Crimean Tatars, but Yuri was not granted a release from prison to attend it. He was buried in Donskoye (Besh-Terek) next to Musa Mamut.
