= Timur Daĝcı =

Crimean Tatar journalist (1932–2022)

- Born: 19 May 1932; Crimea or Samarkand (Note: Some sources say he was born in Samarkand of the Uzbek SSR, while others report he was born in Kizil-tash village, Crimea.)
- Died: 5 February 2022 (aged 89); Crimea
- Known for: Serving as chief editor of the newspaper Lenin Bayrağı
- Awards: Honored Worker of Culture of the Uzbek SSR (1982)

Timur Şahmurad oğlu Daĝcı (Crimean Tatar: Тимур Шахмурад огълу Дагъджы; Russian: Тимур Шахмурадович Дагджи, romanized: Timur Shakhmuradovich Dagdzhi; 19 May 1932 – 5 February 2022) was a Crimean Tatar journalist and newspaper editor. In his youth he was involved in the Crimean Tatar civil rights movement, but later became active in the Communist Party and actively promoted the Mubarek resettlement scheme intended to resettle Crimean Tatars in the Uzbek desert.

== Biography ==
Daĝcı was born to a Crimean Tatar family on 19 May 1932; at the age of fifteen he began working as a car mechanic. Although he graduated from evening school, he initially could not get accepted into journalism school since he was Crimean Tatar. However, he managed to get into the Oriental Faculty of Tashkent University. He started a journalism career in 1956, originally working for a local newspaper in Samarkand but later moved to Tashkent to work on projects in the Crimean Tatar language. He became active in the national movement in 1964, and in 1966 he was arrested for "inciting national discord." He was imprisoned in Lefortovo Prison. According to his accounts, during interrogation, he was very strategic in his responses, avoiding implicating other Crimean Tatars while frequently quoting Marx and Lenin in response to interrogator questions and never capitulated to the interrogators, while Dzhemilev says that he capitulated.

After being released from prison he worked in journalism, and from 1982 to 1985 he was the head editor of the newspaper Lenin Bayrağı. On 31 May 1982 he was awarded the title "Honored Worker of Culture of the Uzbek SSR" by the government of the Uzbek SSR. Deviating from the opinions of other Crimean Tatars, he supported the Mubarek zone scheme for rooting Crimean Tatars in the Uzbek desert instead of returning to Crimea, so he sent his son to live there as an example for other Crimean Tatars and did a lot of work for the Communist Party. He was very critical of the Dzhemilev faction of the Crimean Tatar rights movement. Nevertheless, he was very critical of the Soviet state for denying the existence of Crimean Tatars as a distinct ethnic group, which he described as genocidal in his memoirs. Despite his support for the failed Mubarek project that encouraged Crimean Tatars to stay in Uzbekistan, he moved to his homeland Crimea in 1989.

== See also ==
- Şamil Alâdin
- Nazim Osmanov
