= Seitumer Emin =

Crimean Tatar writer and poet

- Seitümer Ğafar oğlu Emin
- Born: 15 May 1921; Albat village, Bakhchysarai Raion, Crimea, RSFSR
- Died: 21 March 2004 (aged 82); Novorossiysk, Russian Federation
- Awards: Order of the Patriotic War

Seitumer Emin (Crimean Tatar: Seitümer Ğafar oğlu Emin, Russian: Сеитумер Гафарович Эминов; 15 May 1921 – 21 March 2004) was a Crimean Tatar writer and poet. A partisan during World War II, he became an active member of the Crimean Tatar civil rights movement in exile.

== Early life ==
Emin was born on 15 May 1921 to a Crimean Tatar peasant family in Albat. When he was only seven years old his father died, after which he worked as a shepherd on a collective farm to help his mother. After completing secondary school in Biyuk-Ozenbash, he began writing for the Udarnik Newspaper and later for the newspaper Krasny Krym.

== World War II ==
After the start of the German invasion of the Soviet Union, Emin volunteered for the Red army and was deployed to Odessa, where he fought in the defense of the city until he was evacuated to Sevastopol. His experience during the siege of Sevastopol later influenced much of his work. In the final later days of the city's defense, he was wounded and taken to a hospital. After recovering, he was sent to Tuapse, Adgeya. After being wounded multiple times in the Battle for the Caucasus, he was declared unfit for military service. However, he managed to get permission to be sent to Crimea as a partisan, where he worked with other Crimean Tatar leaders and writers including Jebbar Akimov, Refat Mustafayev, and Shamil Aladin. After German troops were expelled from Crimea in April 1944, he continued writing for Qızıl Qırım until 18 May 1944, when he was deported from Crimea due to his Crimean Tatar ethnicity and labeled a "traitor" despite his many military awards from the war.

== Exile ==
Upon arrival in Bekabad he worked in the construction of the Farhad hydroelectric station, where he organized a theater ensemble at the construction site. He later attended Central Asia University. Despite living under strict conditions and harsh penalties for defying the Soviet government, he participated in the Crimean Tatar Civil Rights Movement from his early days in exile. He met secretly with other prominent Crimean Tatars, where they read poetry mourning the loss of their homeland and founded the National Movement of Crimean Tatars. After working as a cinema director he became an editor at the fiction publisher in Tashkent, where he worked from 1967 to 1972. His works included poems and short stories such as "Беяз чечеклер", "Атешли куньлер", "Козьлеринде кедер сездим", "Бульбульнинъ эляк олувы", "О кузь чечеклерини север эди", and "Хатырлав". Having become a member of the Union of Writers of the USSR in 1967, he was admitted to the Union of Journalists of the USSR in 1968. He continued to write about Crimea in both Russian and Crimean Tatar, but his participation in the Crimean Tatar movement led to him having to leave Central Asia. He resettled in Novorossiysk, which was closer to Crimea, but due to the lack of a sizable Crimean Tatar population, his ability to participate in the Crimean Tatar movement was somewhat stifled and it was harder to get his writings in Crimean Tatar published, since almost nobody in Novorossiysk was fluent in the language. For the next few years most of his writing was in Russian. He later continued his work with the Crimean Tatar movement, becoming one of the organizers for the July 1987 Moscow picket for the right of return, where he gave a speech. He later participated in the march from Taman to Simferopol, resulting in him being condemned by name in the newspaper Pravda Vostoka for his role in organizing the protest despite his membership in the Union of Writers of the USSR. After the publication of the newspaper, he and other participants in the march faced intense persecution for their role in it. Despite ongoing persecution of activists in the Crimean Tatar movement, he continued to support the cause; he eventually got his works published in Crimea in the late 1990s, but he lived in Novorossiysk for the remainder of his life. After he died on 21 March 2004 he was buried there, and in 2014 a monument in his hometown of Albat was erected in his memory. His poetry mourning the loss of his beloved Crimea remains popular today.
