= Letter of Seventeen =

1968 open letter urging Crimean Tatars to continue living in Central Asia

The Letter of Seventeen (Crimean Tatar: On yedilikniñ mektübi; Russian: Письмо семнадцати; Ukrainian: Лист сімнадцяти) was an unpopular open letter to the exiled Crimean Tatar community published in Lenin Bayrağı in March 1968 condemning the desire for right of return among other Crimean Tatars, brandishing Crimean Tatars who wished to return as "renegades" and "adventurers". It was dubbed "the letter of seventeen traitors" by the Crimean Tatar community.

== Contents ==
The letter downplayed major struggles and discrimination in Asia, urging Crimean Tatars to accept the situation and take root in Central Asia rather than supporting return to Crimea that many desired. The middle of the letter claimed that Ukaz 493 "radically solved their national question"; however, the decree initially confused some Crimean Tatars into thinking they were allowed to return, where they were deported again. Labeled not Crimean Tatars but "citizens of Tatar nationality formerly living in Crimea," a Soviet euphemism for Crimean Tatars, and gave them no right to reparations or return and in addition normalizing the despised terminology of "citizens of Tatar nationality who formerly lived in the Crimea" instead of "Crimean Tatar". It painted return to Crimea as a desire that should be suppressed for the greater good. It was co-signed by 17 not widely known members of the community.

== Reception ==
Crimean Tatar civil rights activist Yuri Osmanov referred to it as the "letter of national traitors".

Crimean Tatars were allowed right of return decades later. The letter was republished in Avdet, without questioning the existence of the signatories, on 15 March 1991 with condemning the "visceral fear and a state of paralysis before those in power" that pressured the signatories of the letter to sign it.

== Signers ==
The 17 signers:

- Seit Izmailov
- Seit Tairov
- Mustafa Cholakov
- Mustafa Chachi
- Shevket Atamanov
- Anife Alchikova
- Abduraim Appazov
- Yaya Ablyakimov
- Liban Appazov
- Akhtem Mustafaev
- Kurt Sametdinov
- Riza Memetov
- Gulver Asanov
- Shevket Kadyrov
- Meryem Kovaleva
- Isa Azizov
- Memet Molochnikov

== See also ==
- Mubarek zone

== Sources ==
- Bekirova, Gulnara (2005). Крым и крымские татары в XIX-XX веках: сборник статей (in Russian). ISBN 978-5-85167-057-2.
- Guboglo, Mikhail (1992). Крымскотатарское национальное движение: Документы, материалы, хроника (in Russian). Vol. 2. Russian academy of Sciences. pp. 188–189.
- Guboglo, Mikhail (1998). Языки этнической мобилизации (in Russian). Языки русской культуры. ISBN 978-5-457-45045-5.
- Smoly, Valery (2004). Кримські татари: шлях до повернення : кримськотатарський національний рух, друга половина 1940-х-початок 1990-х років очима радянських спецслужб : збірник документів та матеріалів (in Russian). Ін-т історії України. ISBN 978-966-02-3285-3.
