= Ablâziz Veliyev =

Crimean Tatar writer, poet, academic, and historian

Ablâziz Veliyev (Russian: Аблязиз Велиев, romanized as Ablyaziz Veliev; born 25 October 1939) is a Crimean Tatar writer, poet, academic, and historian. He has written many books about Crimean Tatar soldiers of the Red Army during World War II, especially ones who were nominated for the title Hero of the Soviet Union but received a lower award instead.

== Biography ==
He was born in Crimea on 23 or 25 October 1939 in Koz village, Sudak district, Crimea. His father, Veli Mustafayev, was killed in action during World War II when the Nazis sank the ship he was being transported to the front on. As a Crimean Tatar, he and his mother were deported from Crimea as a young child along with the rest of the Crimean Tatars. Growing up in exile, he attended school in Kattakurgan of the Uzbek SSR, which he graduated from in 1957. He began writing articles for local newspapers; he took a break from writing to serve in the Soviet Army, and after serving in the army he worked at a textile plant in Tashkent. There, he began writing to the "Voice of Weavers" newspaper.

After Yusuf Bolat was promoted to the position of deputy editor in chief at the newspaper Lenin Bayrağı after Abdulla Dermenci retired, Veliyev was offered the position but declined at the time because he was not as fluent in the Crimean Tatar language at the time, but ended up getting the position after other people insisted that he accept.

He was a member of the Union of Journalists of the USSR. After working at Lenin Bayrağı, he worked at Yıldız magazine. He worked in many literary positions, and after the fall of the Soviet Union he moved to Crimea; he became a lecturer at the Crimean Engineering and Pedagogical University in 2002. As of 2019, 79 of his books were published.

== Selected works ==
- Veliyev, Ablâziz (2005). Къараманлар ольмейлер: Къырымтатарлар Экинджи Дюнья дженкинде (in Crimean Tatar). Къырым девлет окъув-педагогика нешрияты.
- Veliyev, Ablâziz (2007). Къараманлар ольмейлер: Къырымтатарлар Экинджи Дюнья дженкинде [Heroes do not die: Crimean Tatars in the Second World War] (in Crimean Tatar). Къырым девлет окъув-педагогика нешрияты.
- Veliyev, Ablâziz (2017). Боевые офицеры: Крымские татары в Великой Отечественной войне. Том 2 [Military officers: Crimean Tatars in the Great Patriotic War. Volume 2] (in Russian). Simferopol: ГАУ РК «Медиацентр им. И. Гаспринского». pp. 311–314. ISBN 978-5-906959-06-5. OCLC 1019651855.
- Veliyev, Ablâziz (30 March 1979). "Полвека в литературе". Pravda Vostoka (in Russian). p. 3.
- Veliyev, Ablâziz (11 August 1989). "Многогранный талант". Pravda Vostoka (in Russian). p. 4.
