= Yusuf Bolat =

Crimean Tatar writer

- Born: 16 March [O.S. 3 March] 1909; Alushta, Russian Empire
- Died: 22 October 1986 (aged 77); Tashkent, Uzbek SSR, USSR
- Citizenship: Russian Empire → USSR
- Awards: Order of the Red Banner of Labour (16 March 1979); Honored Worker of Culture of the Uzbek SSR (1969)

Yusuf Memet oğlu Bolat (pen name Ainur; Russian: Юсуф Меметович Болат; 16 March [O.S. 3 March] 1909 – 22 October 1986) was a Crimean Tatar writer, playwright, journalist, and newspaper editor.

== Early life and education ==
He was born on 16 March [O.S. 3 March] 1909 in Alushta, Crimea to an extremely poor family. Due to poverty, his father gave him up as a servant to a wealthy family when he was young. Forced to work from a young age, after the Russian Revolution he was able to study, and he graduated from a small village school in Yalta in 1924 and then entered the Yalta Pedagogical College. He began his writing career when he was still a student. After graduating from the Yalta Pedagogical College he joined the Yalta District Komsomol Committee. In 1931 he entered the Crimean Tatar Language and Literature Faculty of the Simferopol Pedagogical Institute. He became a member of the Communist Party in 1937.

== Literary work ==
His first story to be published was “The bells are ringing", which was published in 1929. Previously in 1928 he wrote a school play about the World War of 1914 that was popular with young audiences. He contributed his works to newspapers and magazines. From 1937 to 1939 he was the executive secretary of the Crimean Writers Organization. In 1941 he wrote the novel "Alim," which was published in the magazine "Soviet Literature." During World War II he served as the deputy editor of the Crimean Tatar newspaper "Qızıl Qırım" and starting in September 1942 he worked in Moscow making broadcasts appealing to Soviet citizens who lived under Nazi occupation to keep on fighting. His works reflected the lives of working-class people; his 1962 novel "Pure Hearts" was about the strong work ethic of workers of different nationalities working in the oil fields of Uzbekistan, and his novel "Anife" focused on the lives of rural workers; the main protagonist of which was based on the real life of Anife Alchikova, one of the signatories of the Letter of Seventeen.

== Life in exile ==
The deportation of the Crimean Tatars put a long halt to his literary activities since it resulted in the shutdown of all Crimean Tatar language media. While in exile in the Uzbek SSR he wrote a sequel to the novel "Alim." Eventually in 1957 the government allowed the Crimean Tatar language newspaper Lenin Bayrağı to be printed in Tashkent. He worked for the newspaper for many years, eventually becoming the deputy editor of it before retiring in 1984. He died in Tashkent on 22 October 1986.
