= Mubarek zone =

Soviet era proposal to settle Crimean Tatars in Uzbekistan

Mubarek zone (Note: The project has been referred to as the Mubarek zone, the Mubarek project, the Mubarek plan, the Mubarek Republic, etc. The project was expanded to encompass the Bahoristan Region in 1979, but the project largely focused on the Mubarek area.) was the name given to a Soviet-Uzbek project to promote Crimean Tatar settlement into the newly formed Mubarek District (Note: Uzbek: Muborak tumani) of the Uzbek SSR, instead of allowing for them to return to their homeland in the Crimea. The project was very unpopular with most Crimean Tatars, who wanted to return to Crimea instead of settling into the Uzbek desert. Many Crimean Tatars viewed the project as an extension of the wider Uzbek cotton scandal. The project kicked off when the Mubarek District was established in the land of the Qashqadaryo Region of Southeastern Uzbekistan in 1978, and the whole settlement project was largely abandoned after the death of its mastermind, Sharof Rashidov, in 1983.

== Background ==
The Crimean Tatar people were deported from Crimea in 1944; while other deported peoples such as the Chechens, Ingush, Karachays, Balkars, and Kalmyks were permitted to return to their homelands and had their titular republics restored in the 1950s by Khrushchev, Crimean Tatars were not granted this right, as their labor was seen as too valuable to let go of by Uzbek authorities. Crimean Tatar rights activists had long been petitioning the government for the right to return to Crimea and restoration of their national autonomy (the Crimean ASSR), but the government steadfastly refused these demands.

Created on 13 September 1978, the area of the Mubarek District was one-fifth the size of Crimea. The climate was very hot, arid, and considered inhospitable, nothing like the lush greenery of Crimea; there were only six tiny settlements in the district when it was formed, composed of Turkmen tribesmen. However, as of 2021, the district has a population of over 88,000 and is much more developed.

== Project ==
Intending to eliminate the Crimean Tatars' desire to return to Crimea, and further rooting Crimean Tatars in their places of exile, the Soviet government came up with the plan of creating a national autonomy with compact residence for them in the almost completely uninhabited Qashqadaryo desert, where Crimean Tatars had no historic ties. Some people in the government felt that promising Crimean Tatars "compact residence" in Mubarek would stop them stop seeking a return to Crimea and restoration of the Crimean ASSR. One of the main organizers of the project was Sharof Rashidov, the leader of the Uzbek SSR at the time.

The Mubarek District of the Uzbek SSR, located within the Qashqadaryo Region, was formed for the project on 13 September 1978; this was followed by the creation of Bahoristan District in April 1979. Nazim Osmanov was chosen to be the secretary of the new Mubarek District. Seit Tairov, First Secretary of the Jizzax Region and signatory of the Letter of Seventeen, was recruited to aid the project. As the project was unsuccessful he was transferred to the Ministry of Forestry, leading to jokes that he was chosen for the position to make trees take root since he failed at making Crimean Tatars take root in the area.

Despite promises of creating national autonomy with cultural institutions for Crimean Tatars, the government still had no intention of treating Crimean Tatars as a completely distinct ethnic group and continued to maintain the line that Crimean Tatars were a subgroup of the Volga Tatars, a completely different ethnic group; only in 1989, years after the project was canceled, did the government abolish all restrictions on the use of the term Crimean Tatar.

== Attempted implementation ==
The Communist Party put pressure on respected members of the Crimean Tatar community like Mustafa Selimov to support the project, but he completely refused and said that returning to Crimea would be the only solution to their national question. Other Crimean Tatars like Şamil Alâdin caved into the pressure and conducted agitation encouraging Crimean Tatars to move to Mubarek. Deputy Chairman of the Presidium of the Supreme Soviet of the Uzbek SSR Georgy Orlov was chosen to meet with Crimean Tatar elites to recruit them into supporting the project. Timur Daĝcı, head editor of the Crimean Tatar language newspaper Lenin Bayrağı, was supportive of the project and sent his son to live in Mubarek to be an example for other Crimean Tatars. The newspaper Lenin Bayrağı] and the magazine Yıldız frequently published articles encouraging relocation to Mubarek, singing praises of the development of the project. Sources differ as to how supportive Cherkez Ali was of the project, with some sources reporting he was extremely skeptical of the project while others report he was supportive of the project; however, there is no dispute that he did actively encourage Crimean Tatars to move to the Mubarek district. Writer and poet Şamil Alâdin also helped promote the project after he was asked to by Georgy Orlov; he did not deny his remarks in which he said he would support the project because the party wanted it. However, he had little enthusiasm about it despite Georgy Orlov constantly trying to increase his enthusiasm for resettlement in Mubarek.

Very few Crimean Tatars willingly moved to Mubarek; many were put under intense pressure to move there. Some were effectively forced to move to Mubarek after being re-deported from Crimea after attempting to return and then being only offered a residence permit in the Mubarek area. In 1983 the government tried to make all graduates of the Crimean Tatar language department of the Nizami Pedagogical Institute (which was not called a Crimean Tatar language faculty but rather called Tatlit institute due to censorship) (Note: Even though the government was marketing the project as a national autonomy for Crimean Tatars, the government did not count Crimean Tatars as a distinct ethnic group in censuses and officially considered Crimean Tatars to be a subgroup of Volga Tatars despite their different origins. For more information, read Denial of Crimean Tatars by the Soviet Union.) move to the area, but they strongly protested the plan. The government never told them an official reason for demanding that all of them move to Mubarek even though there were only two job spots open for them, nor did the party answer why it was not sending any of them to cities with large Crimean Tatar populations like Chirchiq. But in the end, it was clear that the reason that all of them were told to go to Mubarek despite most not being needed for work was to increase the population of Crimean Tatars in the district.

Only a tiny fraction of the Crimean Tatar population moved to Mubarek; while the government claimed that 4,000 of them moved to Mubarek, this figure is derived from the combination of Crimean Tatars and Volga Tatars who moved there, with the actual population of Crimean Tatars being somewhere between 1,900 to 2,000.

The project was canceled shortly after the death of Sharof Rashidov, the mastermind of the project, who fell out of favor of party leadership after the cotton affair got more attention.

== Reception ==
Most Crimean Tatars had no desire to resettle anywhere except in Crimea and were not interested in a national autonomy outside Crimea and especially did not want to participate in the project by relocating to the Mubarek District. Most Crimean Tatars viewed it as merely a scheme of Sharof Rashidov to fleece Moscow of more funds. Among the few Crimean Tatars such as Şamil Alâdin who supposed the project, many did so reluctantly and only because the Communist Party wanted them to.

Some Crimean Tatar participants in the project admitted that they understood the inherently flawed nature of the plan were personally uncomfortable with the idea and did not expect it to amount to anything. Crimean Tatars who supported the project were typically stigmatized as traitors to other Crimean Tatars. The project beneficial to the development of area, which was desolate at the time, and so supports of Rashidov view the project as one of his many accomplishments. However, the project remains seen in an almost universally negative light by Crimean Tatars, who compare other resettlement projects that promote residing outside of Crimea as "Mubarek zone" style projects as a point of comparison. While Crimean Tatar-Uzbek relations were not as terrible as Meskhetian Turk-Uzbek relations, and often were positive, the project did anger many Uzbeks who did not want Moscow to give Crimean Tatars a national autonomy in Uzbekistan, and Crimean Tatar-Uzbek relations could have worsened if Crimean Tatars went along with the plan to occupy the Mubarek District.

== See also ==
- Uzbek cotton scandal
- Virgin Lands campaign
