= Memet Molochnikov =

Crimean Tatar commissar

- Born: 30 December 1912; Bakhchisarai
- Died: 19 January 2003 (aged 90); Samarkand
- Awards: Order of the Red Star

Memet Bilyalovich Molochnikov (Russian: Мемет Билялович Молочников; 30 December 1912 — 19 January 2003) was a Crimean Tatar commissar, Communist Party member, partisan, and military lawyer.

== World War II activities ==
He was drafted into the Red Army in 1941 and originally worked in the military tribunal of the 48th Cavalry Division. After the division became surrounded during a Nazi military offensive he switched to working in the partisan military tribunal system. From 10 October 1942 to 5 January 1943 he was the secretary of the Military Tribunal of the Crimean Partisan Detachments in Qarasubazar. The tribunal handled a wide range of types of cases. After the Crimean Partisan groups were reorganized, he served as a partisan, commanding a sabotage group. While functioning as a partisan in Crimea, he personally participated in military combat operations, personally killing two Nazis as well as helping destroy vehicles.

== Personal life ==
He was born to a Crimean Tatar family on 30 December 1912 in Bakhchisarai. Before the war he worked at the Supreme Court of the Crimean ASSR. After the war he worked at the Krasny Dvigatel Plant in Samarkand. In 1968 he became one of the signatories of the very unpopular Letter of Seventeen that encouraged other Crimean Tatars to give up on their dreams of returning to Crimea. He died in Samarkand on 19 January 2003.
