= Abdulla Daĝcı =

Crimean Tatar Soviet partisan in World War II

- Nicknames: Uncle Volodya (Russian: Дядя Володя)
- Born: 1900; Körbekül, Russian Empire (now Izobilne, Crimea)
- Died: 26 June 1943 (aged 42–43) Simferopol, German-occupied Crimea
- Allegiance: Soviet Union
- Branch: Partisans
- Service years: 1941–1943
- Conflicts: World War II; Eastern Front (World War II)

Abdulla Daĝcı (1900 – 26 June 1943) was a Crimean Tatar Soviet partisan commander based around the city of Simferopol during World War II. Responsible for organising both the Simferopol resistance and resistance among ethnic Crimean Tatars, Daĝcı was captured and executed by the Germans in July 1943. Following his death, he was nominated for the title of Hero of the Soviet Union twice (in 1943 and 1966), with neither nomination being accepted by the Soviet government.

== Early life and career ==
Abdulla Daĝcı was born in 1900, in the village of Körbekül (now Izobilne, Alushta Raion), in what was then part of the Russian Empire. In 1924, he completed training to become a cadre of the All-Union Communist Party, and became head of the Massandra Winery combine. In 1932, he was appointed as head of the Balaklava District party committee. He later became head of the Yalta Raion party committee.

== World War II ==
Following the beginning of Operation Barbarossa, Daĝcı was involved in the evacuation of civilians from Crimea, additionally playing a role in the construction of a stay-behind network to serve as a basis for underground activity following German occupation. Shortly prior to the capture of Simferopol by German forces, Daĝcı fled with his family to the village of Stilâ. From Stilâ, Daĝcı and his family fled to Sevastopol, where they joined with remaining Red Army forces on the retreat. Shortly thereafter, however, the Red Army was encircled around Yalta and Daĝcı's family was forced to flee to the Crimean Mountains, where they met with the Soviet partisans operating in Crimea. Daĝcı and his sister joined the partisans, and were tasked with capturing the German mayor of the village of Büyük Özenbaş, a mission they successfully completed.

In September 1942, Daĝcı was placed as the leader of a group of ten partisans, including his sister, who were to establish an underground network in the city of Simferopol. The network was established in the village of Kara Kiyat, located 3 km (1.9 mi) outside of Simferopol. At this time, Daĝcı took on the nickname of "Uncle Volodya" (Russian: Дядя Володя, romanized: Dyadya Volodya).

Daĝcı's network was the largest in Crimea during World War II, encompassing members of the German security forces, hospitals, and the collaborationist local government of Yalta. It participated in the Rail War and attacks on German military bases, provided supplies to the partisans, and collected 20,000 rubles, which were sent to the Soviet Union proper and used to build an aeroplane.

Beginning in May 1943, Daĝcı's group began subordinating other partisan groups at the behest of the military command, which expressed its desire for Daĝcı to shift his goal towards convincing Crimean Tatar collaborators to join the partisans. As a result of Daĝcı's efforts, a member of Schutzmannschaft Battalion 147, Baki Gaziyev, defected to the partisans. Gaziyev's defection enabled partisan forces to bring an end to the German blockade of the partisan-run airfield in the Qarabiy yayla mountain range. At its peak, Daĝcı's network included 35 or 78 people, and included several members of his family. According to Refiq Muzafarov, author of the Crimean Tatar Encyclopaedia, two thirds of Daĝcı's organisation were ethnic Crimean Tatars.

== Death and legacy ==
It remains a source of dispute as to how Daĝcı's group was unravelled. According to The Long Way to the Truth, a memoir by partisan Galina Skripnichenko-Korovyakovskaya, the partisan group fell after one of its members was arrested by the Sicherheitsdienst and divulged information to German authorities. According to other sources, however, the organisation was destroyed from within by two pro-German infiltrators, Zoya Martynova and Tatyana Andreyeva. On 12 June 1943, Daĝcı and his family members were arrested by the Nazis. Daĝcı himself was executed on 26 June 1943, and five of his family members were executed by the Gestapo. Other members of his organisation were either tortured to death, executed by firing squad, or imprisoned at the Krasny concentration camp.

Following Daĝcı's death, the Crimean Regional Committee of the All-Union Communist Party petitioned to the State Defense Committee that he be awarded the title of Hero of the Soviet Union. However, the request went unanswered. In 1966, another attempt was made to nominate Daĝcı for the title by 24 Crimean Tatar intellectuals, this time alongside partisan scout Alime Abdenanova (who was later awarded the title of Hero of the Russian Federation in 2014). Once again, the nomination was unsuccessful, this time resulting in said intellectuals, many of whom were supporters of the Crimean Tatar civil rights movement, being noted by the Soviet government as political opponents.

In 1998, repatriated Crimean Tatars living in the Kamianka village named a street after Daĝcı.

In 2017, the Council of Elders of the Crimean Tatars of Alushta sent a petition to Sergey Aksyonov, head of the Republic of Crimea, requesting that a memorial to Daĝcı and his family be installed in his native village of Izobilne.
