= Yuke-Tepe =

Mountain

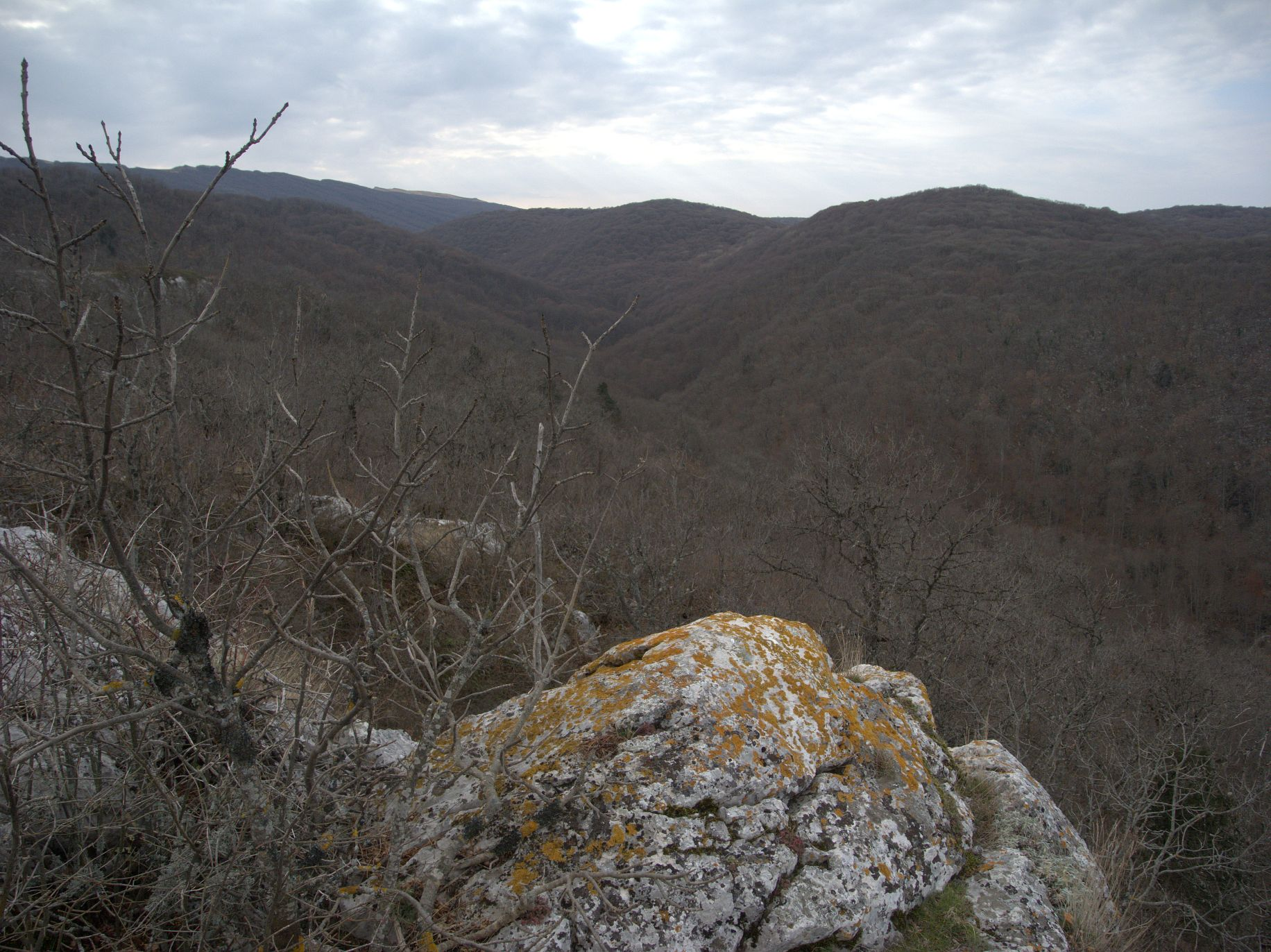

Highest point
- Elevation: 1,025 m (3,363 ft)
- Coordinates: 44°50′33″N 34°26′07″E

Geography
- Location within Crimea Location within Ukraine
- Countries: Ukraine, Russia
- Region: Crimea
- District: Simferopol Raion
- Parent range: Crimean Mountains

Yuke-Tepe, Yuki-Tepe, height 1025 (Ukrainian: Юки-Тепе; Crimean Tatar: Yüke Töpe, Юке Тёпе), is a mountain of the main range of the Crimean Mountains, the southwestern part of the Orta Syrt yaila. It is located in the Simferopol Raion. It has a dome-shaped, deciduous forest-covered summit, with a height of 1025 metres. During the World War II here several formations of Crimean resistance during World War II were based, and hard battles were fought. At the top, searchers built many memorial signs to commemorate the partisans.

== Description ==
The name in translation from Crimean Tatar means "linden peak" (yüke — linden, töpe — peak). The height of the highest point is 1025 metres. The summit has the shape of a horseshoe (whence another later name) with its horns orientated to the north-west. The south-eastern slope is steep and has a rock wall. It is covered with beech-oak-hornbeam forest.

The mountain is located in the Simferopol Raion. From the west, the peak is separated by a deep valley of the Burulcha river. On the other side of the valley, even further west Dedov Kuren mountain, 1016 metres, is located. To the south of Yuke-Tepe runs the valley of a tributary of the Burulcha, named Partizanka on a number of maps. To the east and north is another unnamed tributary of Burulcha with a non-permanent watercourse. Its valley separates Yuke-Tepe from the main massif of the southern part of Orta Syrt. On the other side of the valley to the north of Yuke-Tepe is the tract of Mokrousov Rocks, named after the headquarters of the Crimean partisan movement under the command of A. V. Mokrousov.

On the southern slope of the mountain, above a rocky ledge is a viewpoint on Tirke yayla. In other directions, due to forest cover, the view from the summit of Yuke-Tepe is limited.

== History ==
In November 1941, the area of Zuya forests became the base of the 2nd district of the Crimean partisans (Zuya and Karasubazar forests), which included Karasubazar, Dzhankoy, Ichkinskiy, Kolay, Seitler, Zuisky, Biyuk-Onlar detachments, and later Red Army detachment No. 1 and Red Army detachment No. 2.

The network of deep river valleys (Burulcha, Malaya Burulcha, Suvat) between Dolgorukovskaya yaila, Yaman-Tash ridge and Orta-Syrt yaila gave the guerrillas opportunities for manoeuvre and retreat. Even after temporary retreats during large sweeps, the area was soon reoccupied by partisans. Additionally, its value lay in the presence of the Small Partisan Airfield in the north-east of Orta Syrt.

The command of the 2nd Partisan District was based at the height 1025. In 1941-1942, the headquarters of the 2nd Partisan District headed by I. G. Kurakov and I. S. Bedin was here. In 1944 the command post of the Northern connection of the Crimean partisans (commander P. R. Yampolsky, commissar N. D. Lugovoi). The underground Crimean Regional Party Committee was housed here for some time. The partisan radio station communicated with the "Big Land".

The site of persistent fighting during the "Big Search" on 22–25 July 1942, when the German-Romanian troops tried in vain to completely clear the Crimean mountains of partisans.

In the sanitary tents of the hospital of the 2nd district on the eve of the battle near the mountain Yukiye-Tepe in the Burulcha riverbed on 25 July 1942 there were 62 sick and wounded people. Doctors Ya. A. Ruban, S. G. Mitler, N. P. Kostrubey and nurses Vera Shiro, Alla Muslumova, Olya Shilkina, Melanya Tarlakova and others rendered them medical aid. At dawn on 25 July the enemy managed to infiltrate the area. The wounded and staff fought back to the last cartridge. Among those killed in the battle were doctor Nina Petrovna Kostrubey and military paramedic Kirill Grigorievich Naidenko.

== Monuments ==
=== Partisan cannon ===
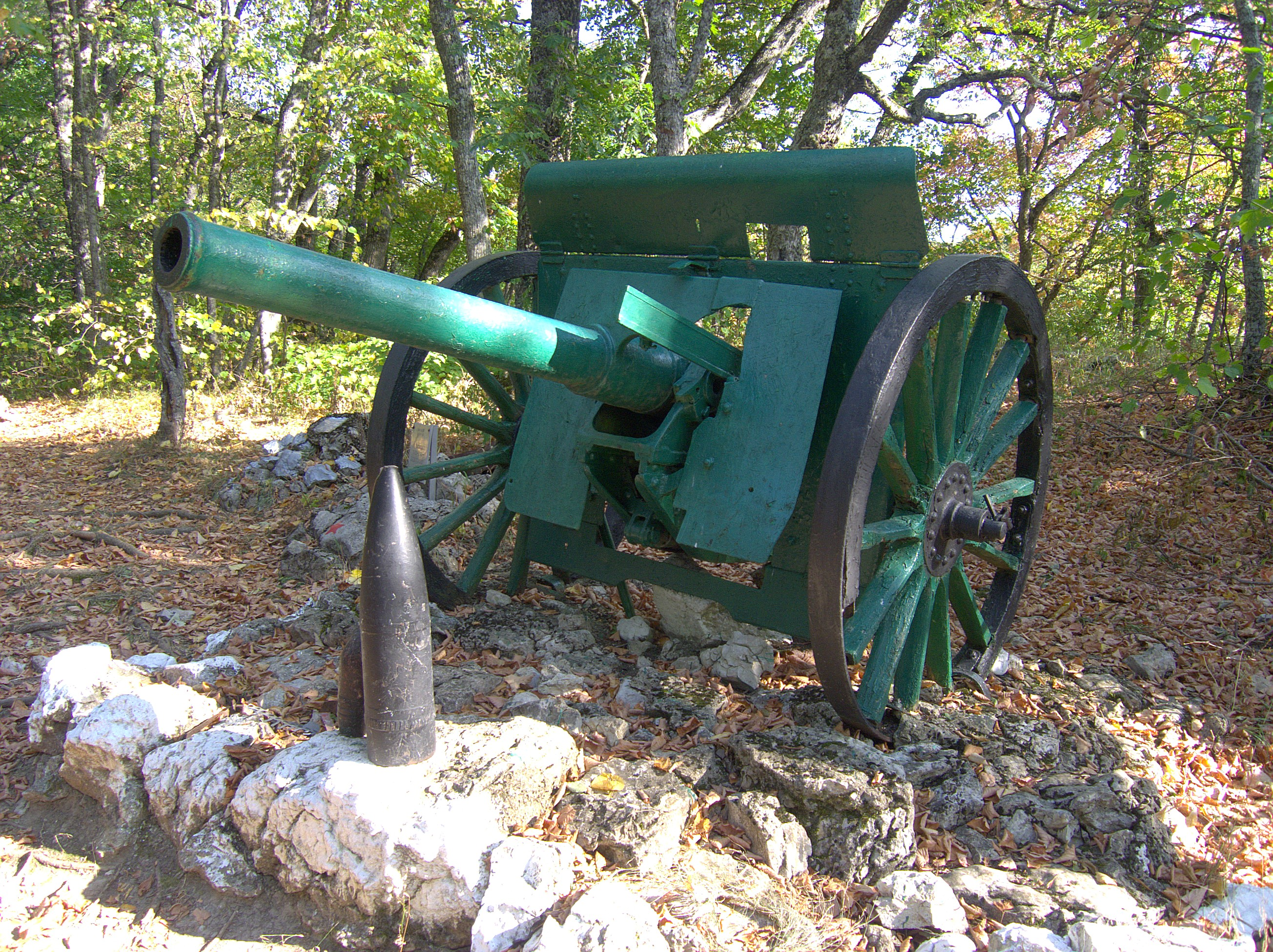
Memorial sign to partisan artillerymen on Yuki-Tepe Mountain (height 1025)

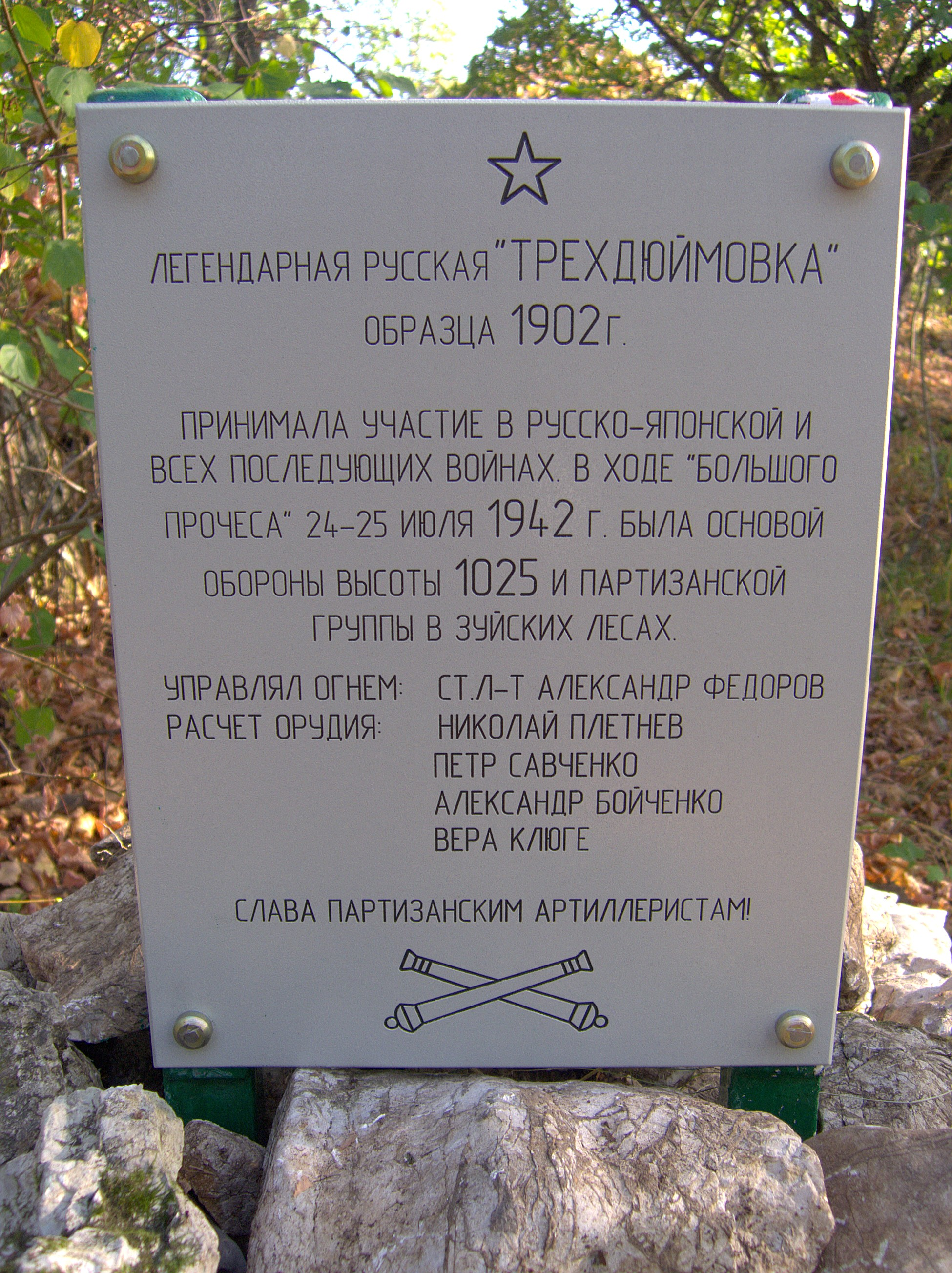
Historical background plaque

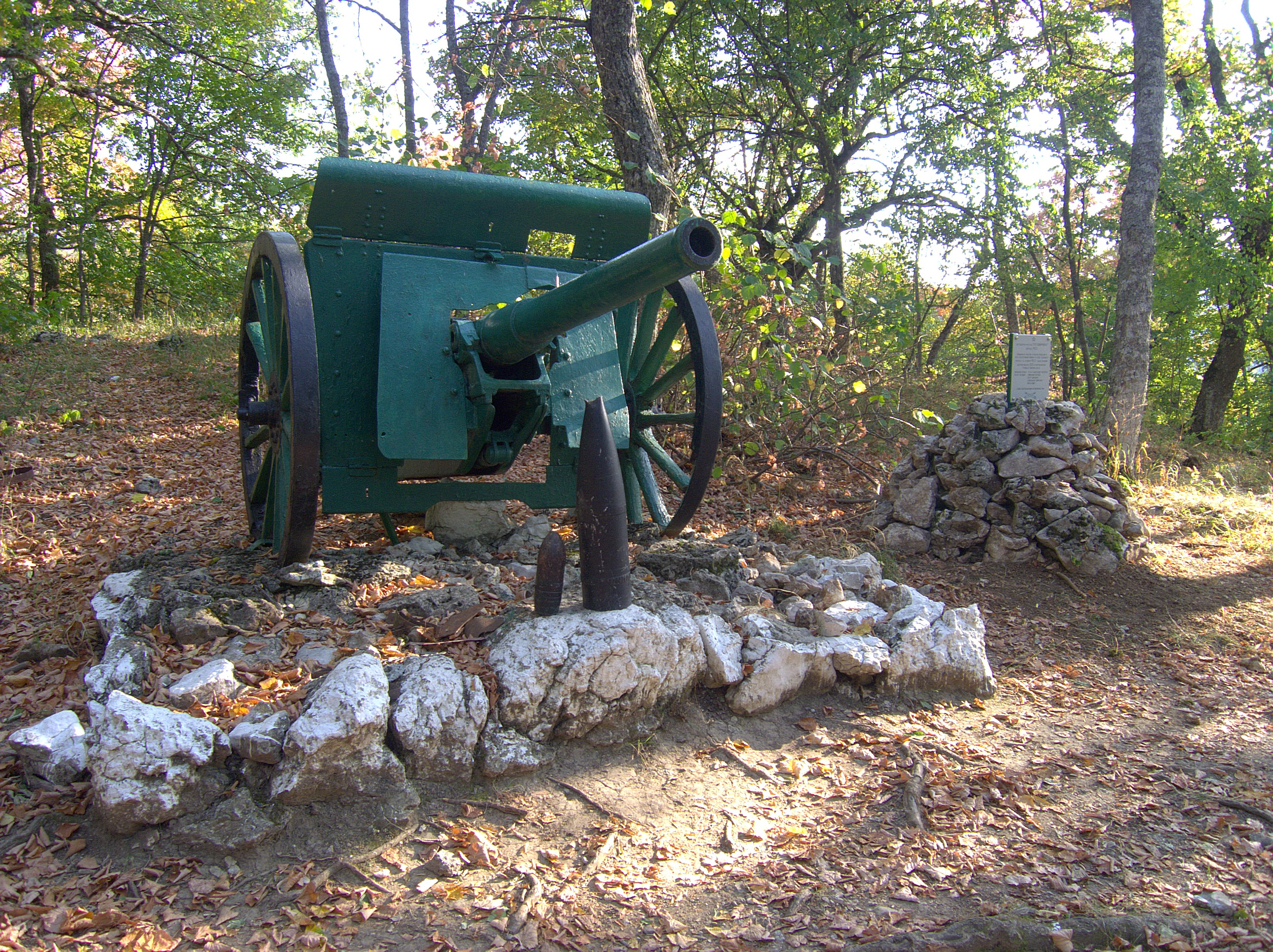
Historical background plaque

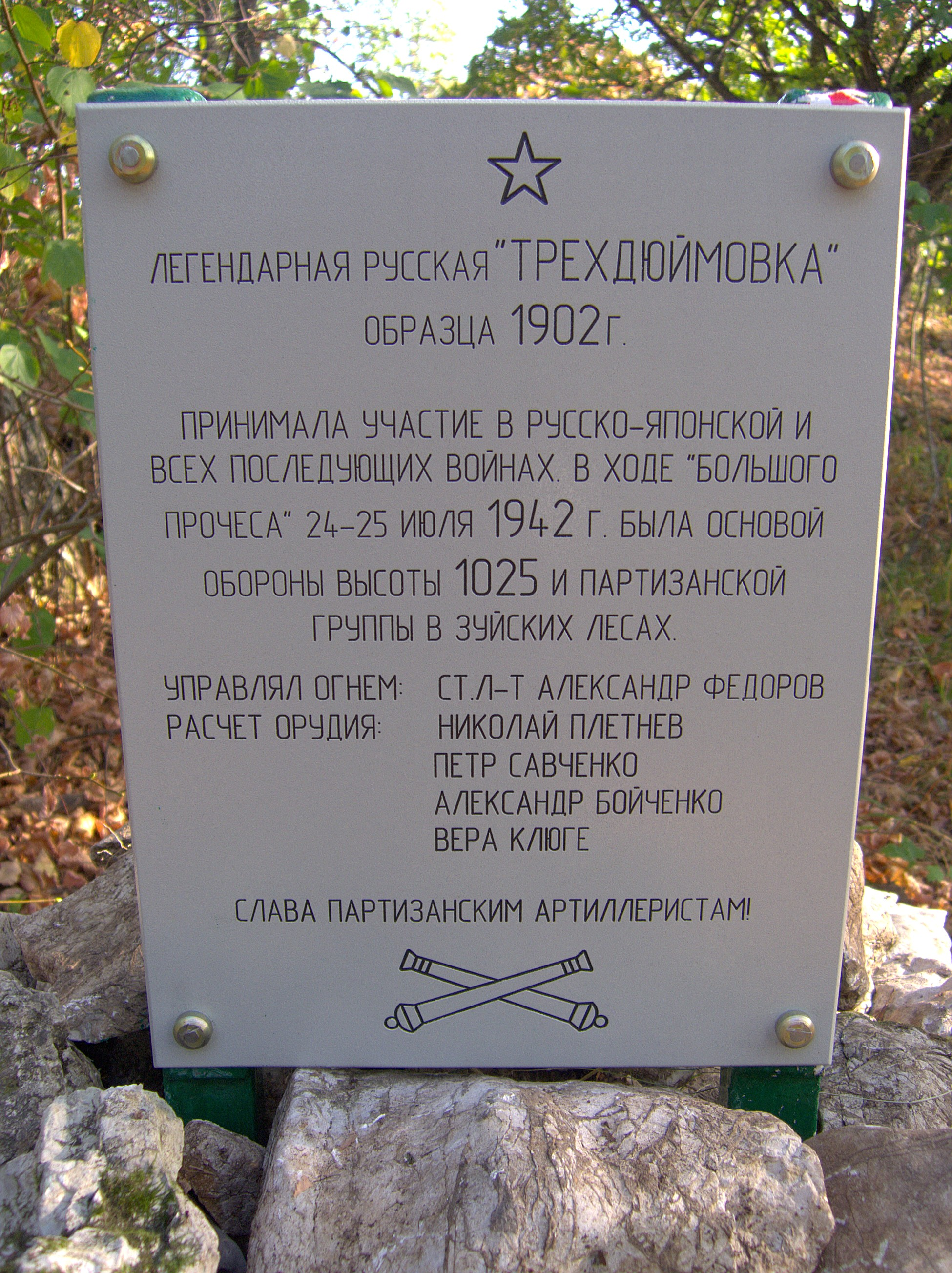
General view

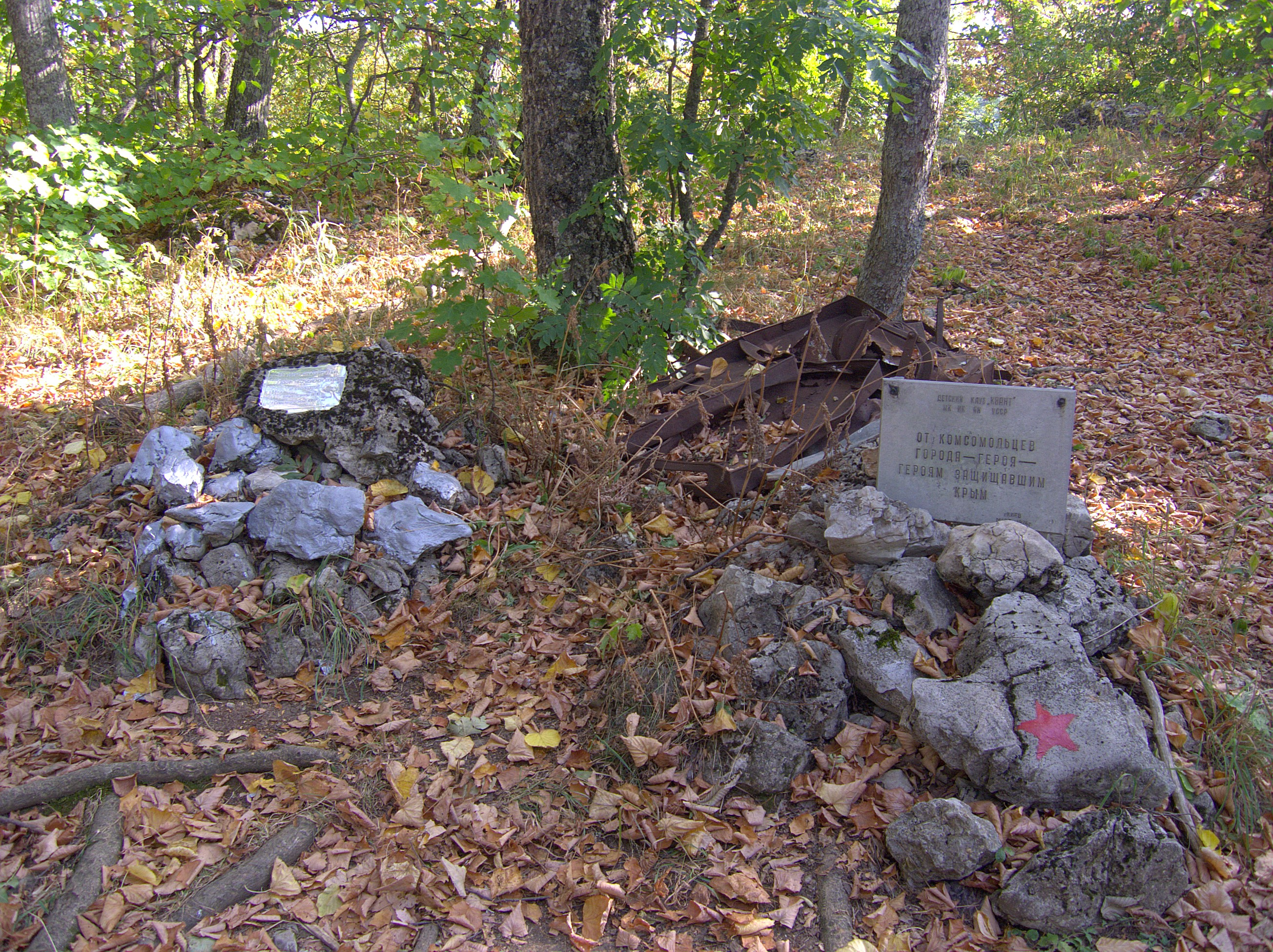
Dedication plaques from collectives and searchers of different years

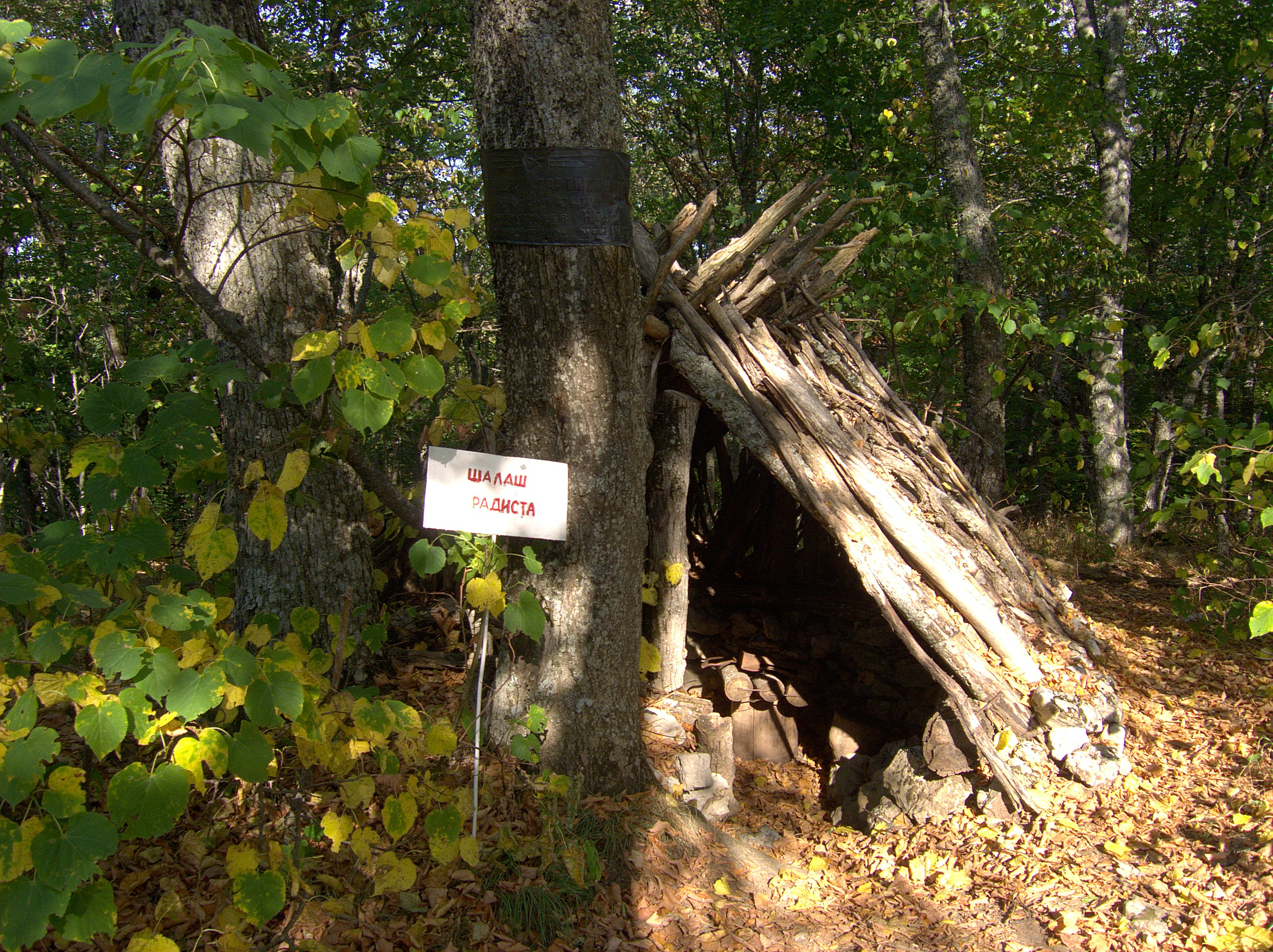
The radio operator's tent

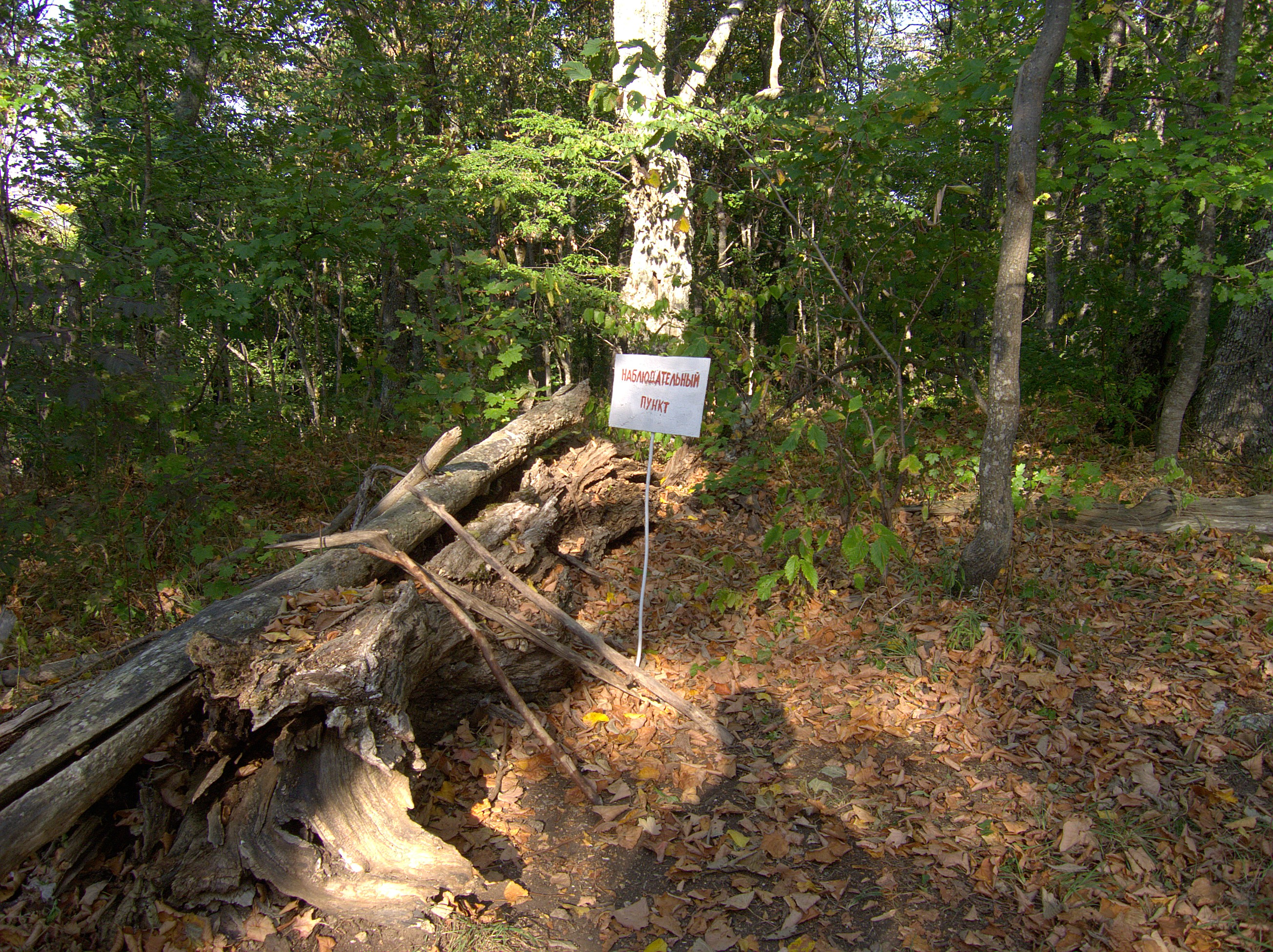
Observation post

Official name: Memorial sign to partisan artillerymen on Yuki-Tepe Mountain (height 1025). 44.846375°N 34.430557°E

It was built in 1962 by Komsomol members. This three-inch cannon was left by Soviet troops in the area of Barabanovka during the retreat to Sevastopol. Partisans sheltered the gun and later dragged it by hand up Yuke-Tepe mountain. During the fighting of the summer of 1942, from the forested height of 1025, it fired on the nearby hills. Gun commander Senior Lieutenant Alexander Fedorov. Settlement N. Pletnyov, P. Savchenko, A. Boychenko, V. Kluge. When the ammunition ran out, the partisans threw the gun down a steep slope so that the enemy would not get it. For about 20 years the cannon lay at the bottom of the gorge. In 1966, on Victory Day, Komsomol searchers returned the cannon to the top and created a memorial around it. At the height, which overlooks the cliffs of Tyrke, there are several mass and individual graves of partisans who died in that unequal battle.

The cannon is in satisfactory condition despite its age. The quality steel resists corrosion, the rifling in the barrel has been preserved. The wooden carriage is more damaged. On the barrel there is an inscription: "S. St. Petersburg foundry, No. 196, 1902". For about 20 years the cannon lay at the bottom of the gorge, and in 1966, on Victory Day, the Komsomol members returned the cannon to the top and created a memorial around it.

Identified object of cultural heritage. It was registered by the order of the Committee for Protection of Cultural Heritage from 16.01.2006 № 1.

Over time on the mountain Yuke-Tepe by the efforts of searchers around the cannon grew a whole memorial complex: reconstructed dugout of radio operators, observation point of scouts, in a special container installed the Book of Memory.

From 20 December 2016 Yuki-Tepe was recognized as a federal cultural heritage site in Russia.

=== Other monuments ===
At the top of Yuke Tepe
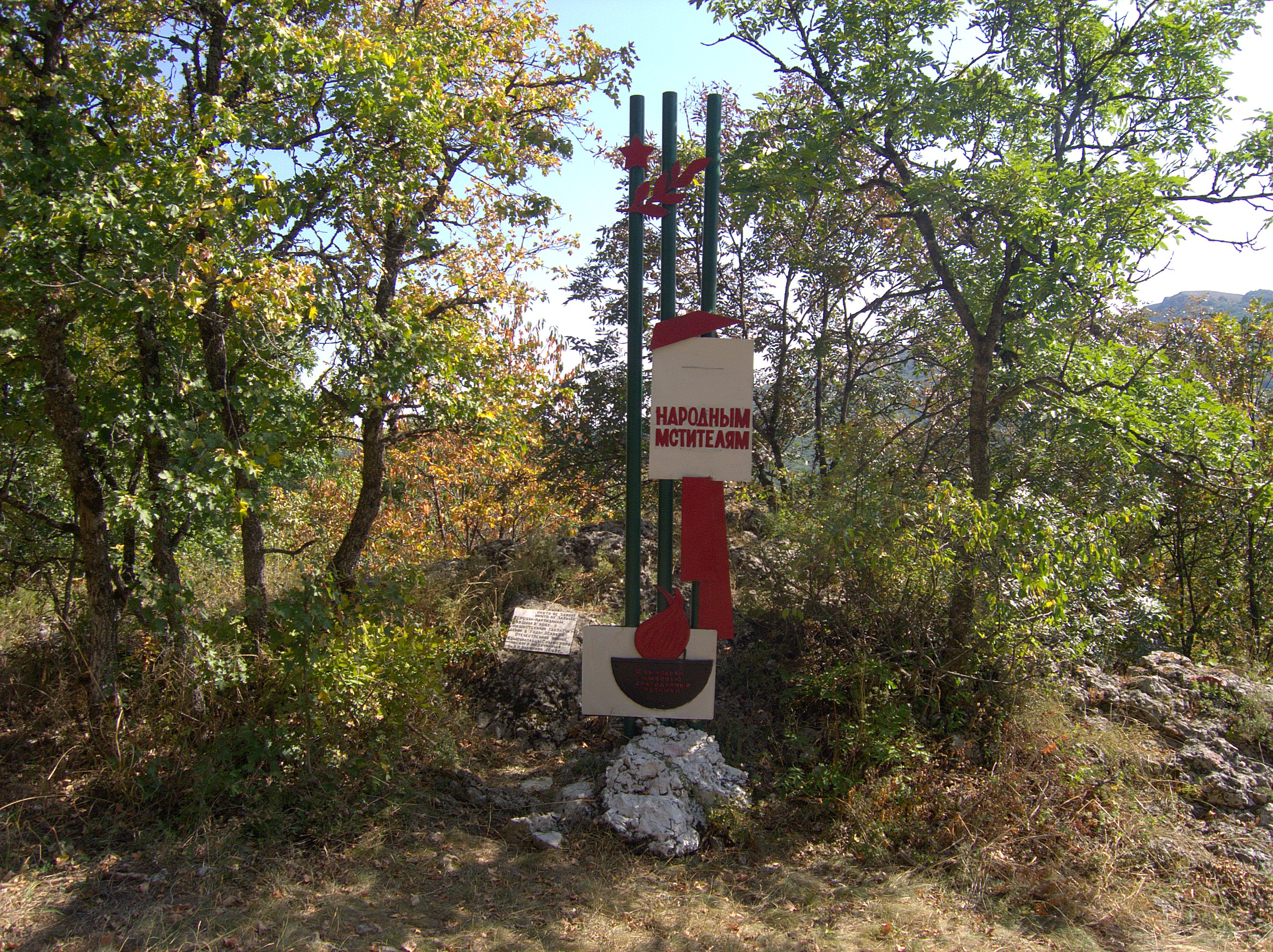
To the People's Avengers

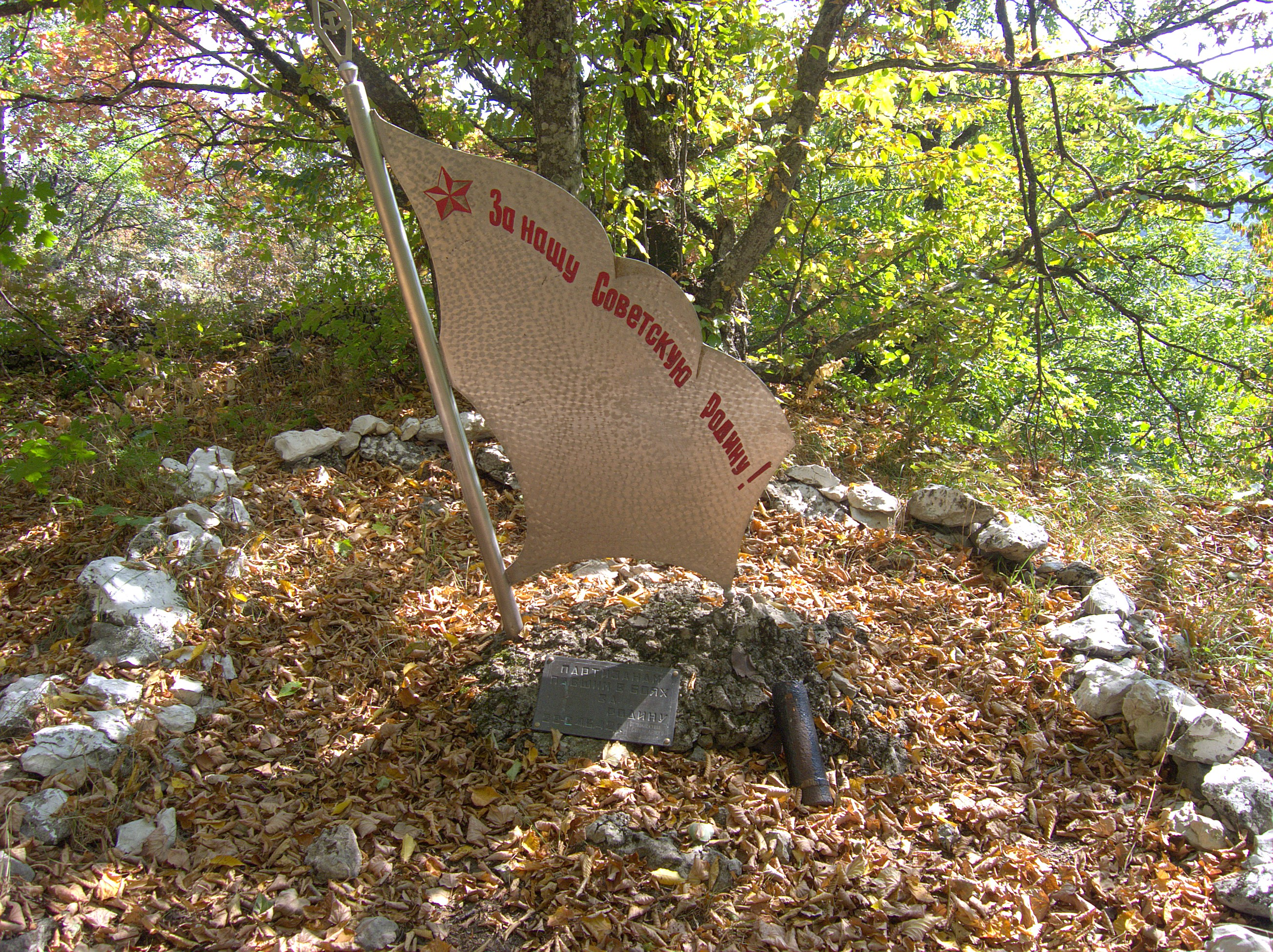
Partisan banner

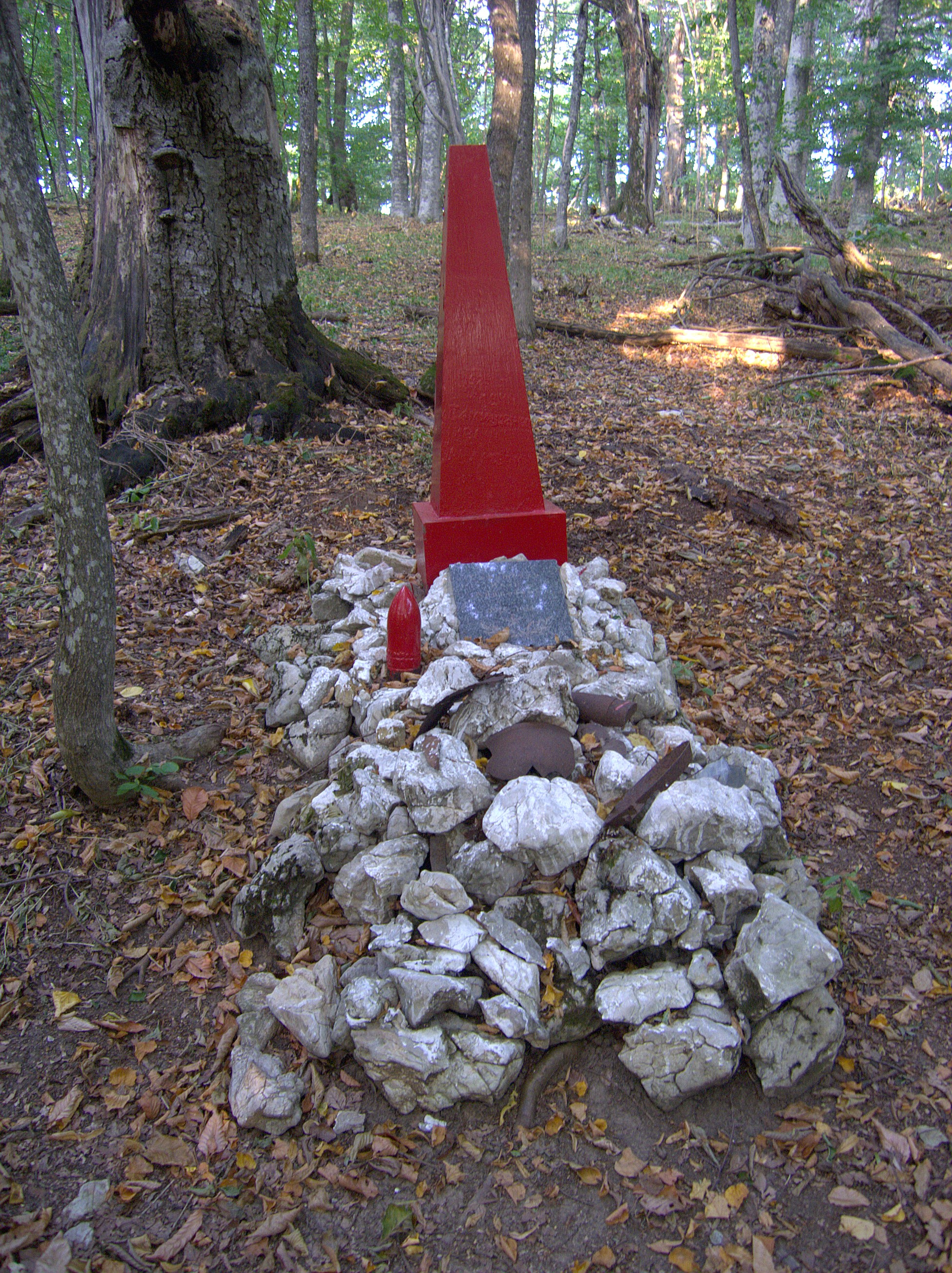
The grave of partisan I.A. Samishchenko.

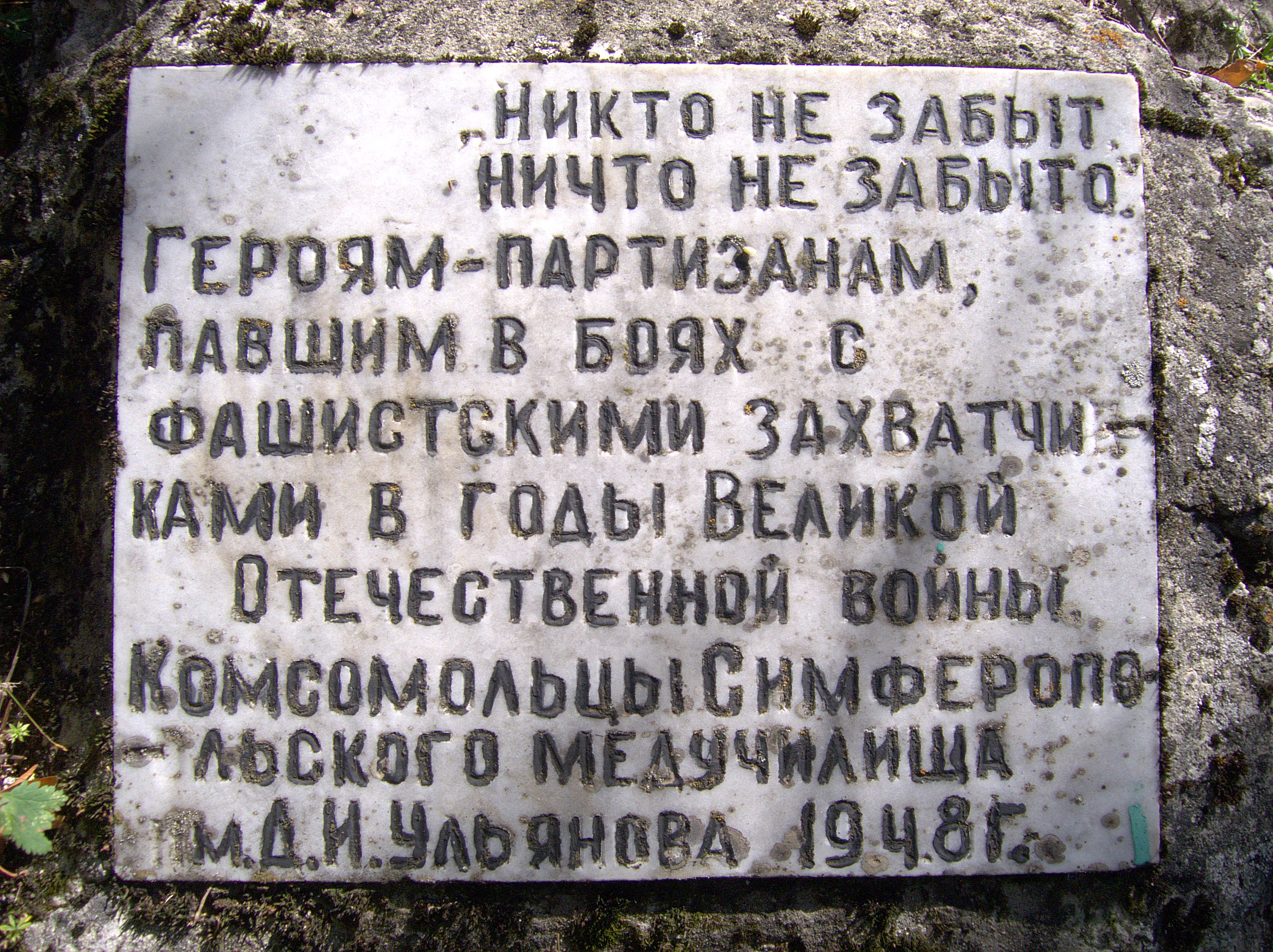
From the Komsomol members of Simferopol Medical School, 1948

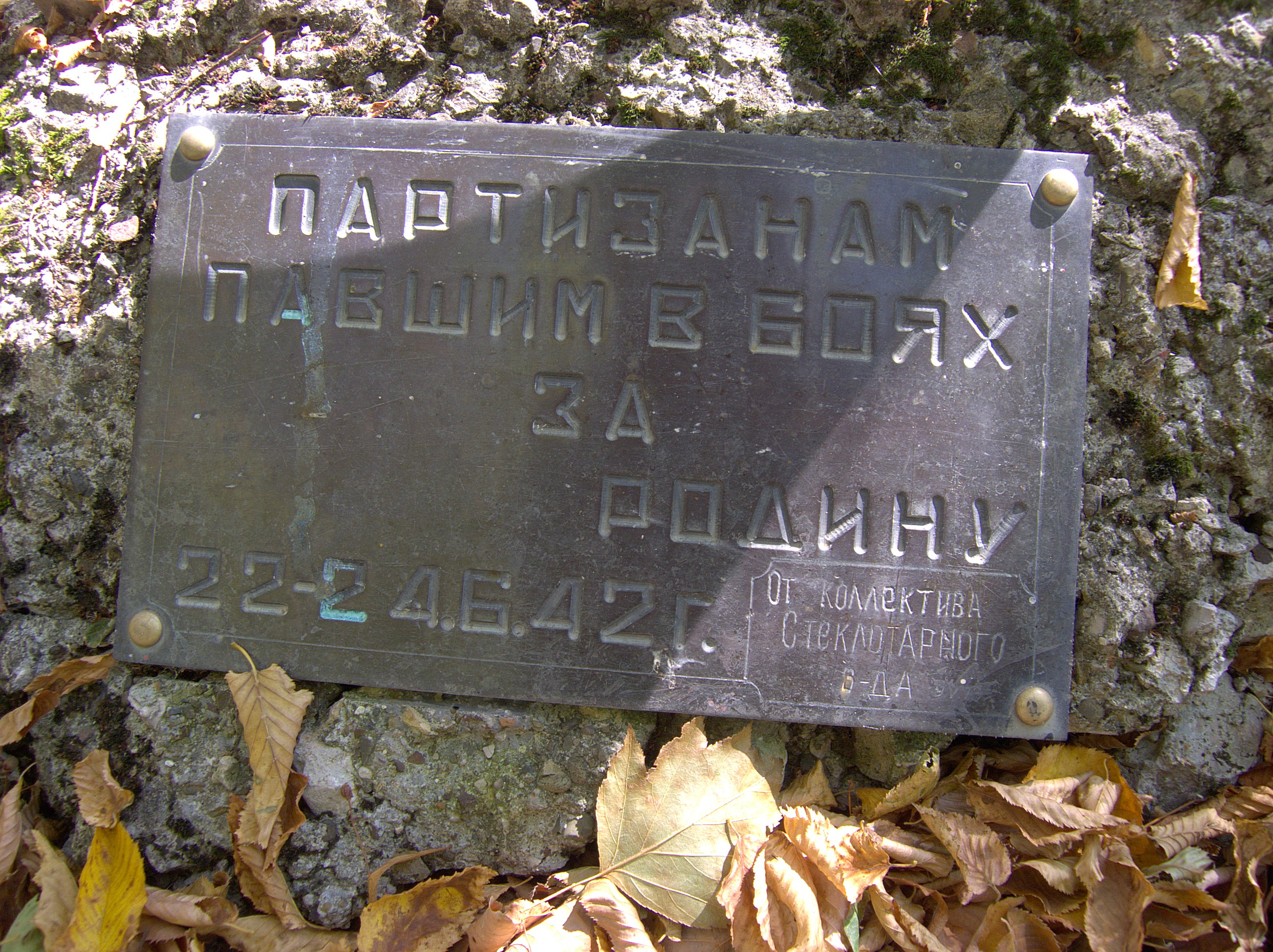
From the workers of the glass factory

On the top of the mountain is the monument sign "To the People's Avengers".

East of the cannon is the grave of partisan Samishchenko 44.845278°N 34.433889°E. The inscription on the monument: Samishchenko Ivan Andreevich 1925-1944. Nearby you can find the restored dugout.

On the south-eastern slope of the mountain, east of the rocky ledge the monument Partisan Banner is located 44.841718°N 34.435069°E.

At the top of Yuke Tepe
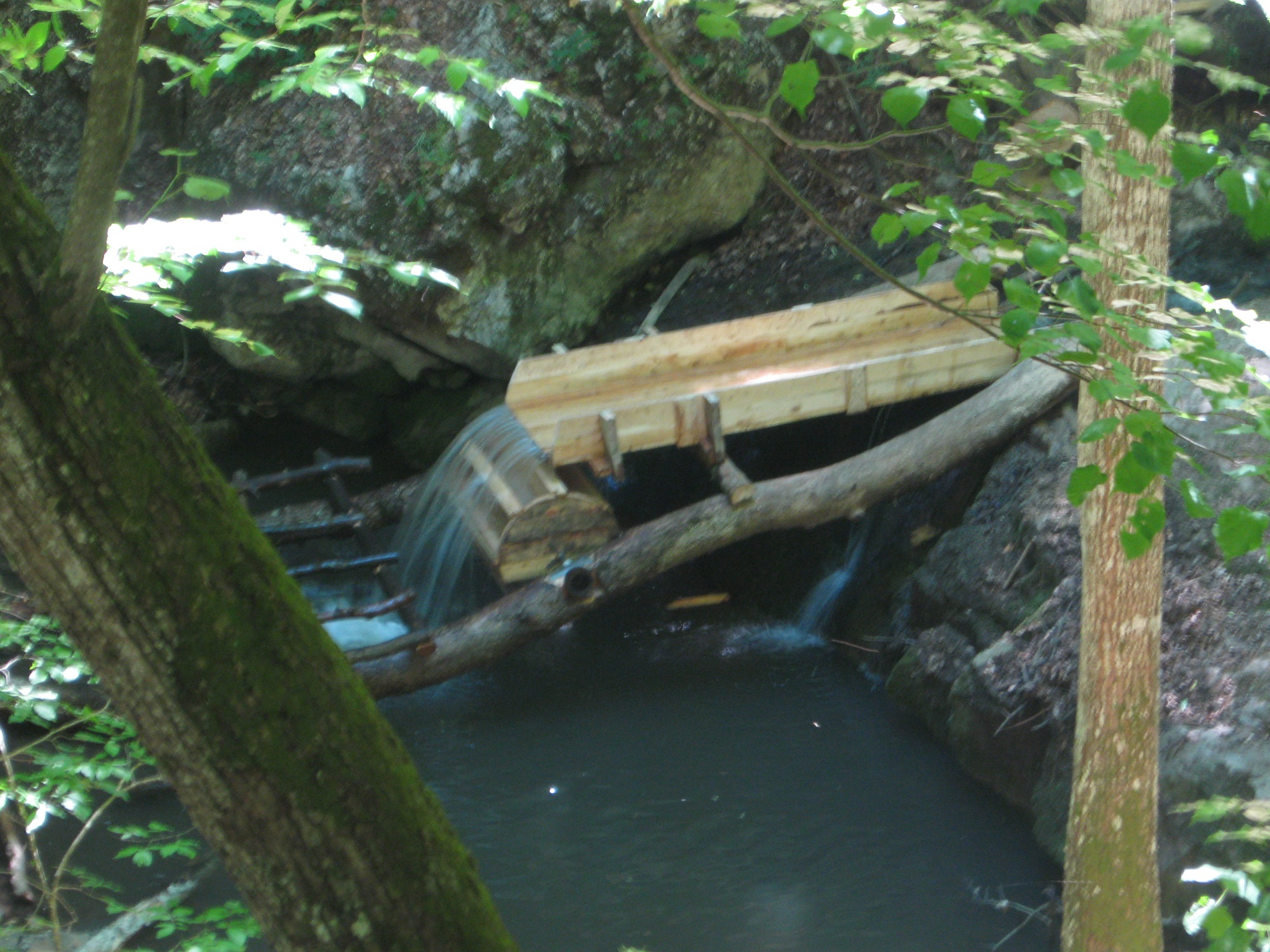
Partisan Mill (reconstruction)

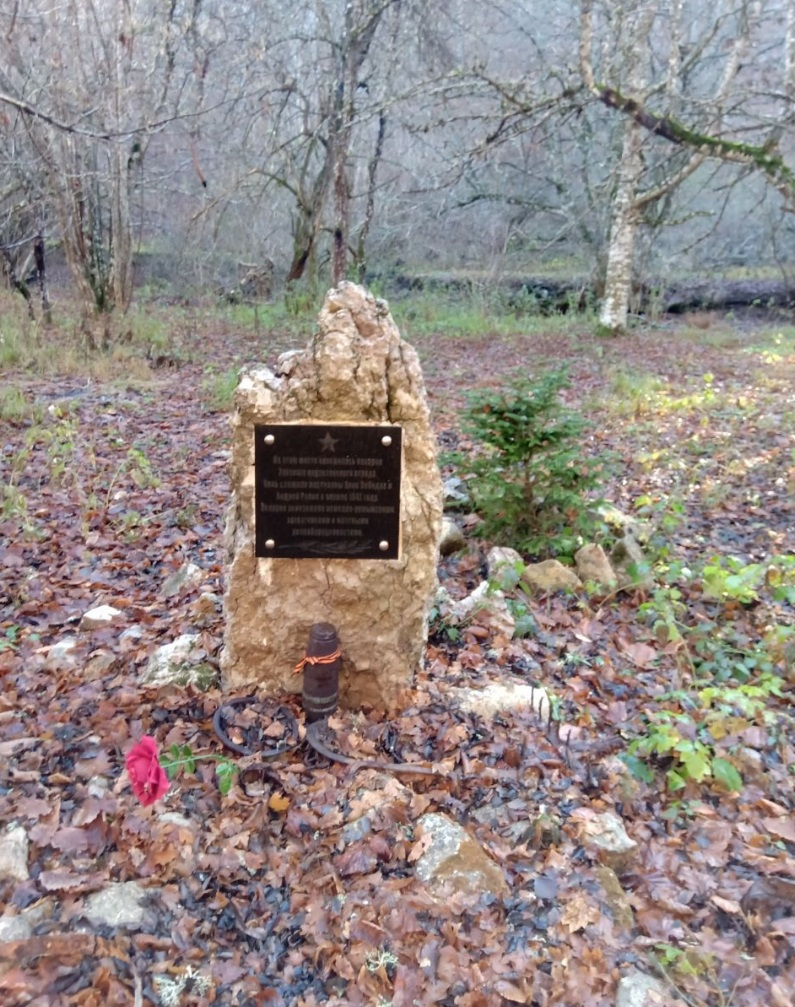
A sign at the site of a partisan bakery

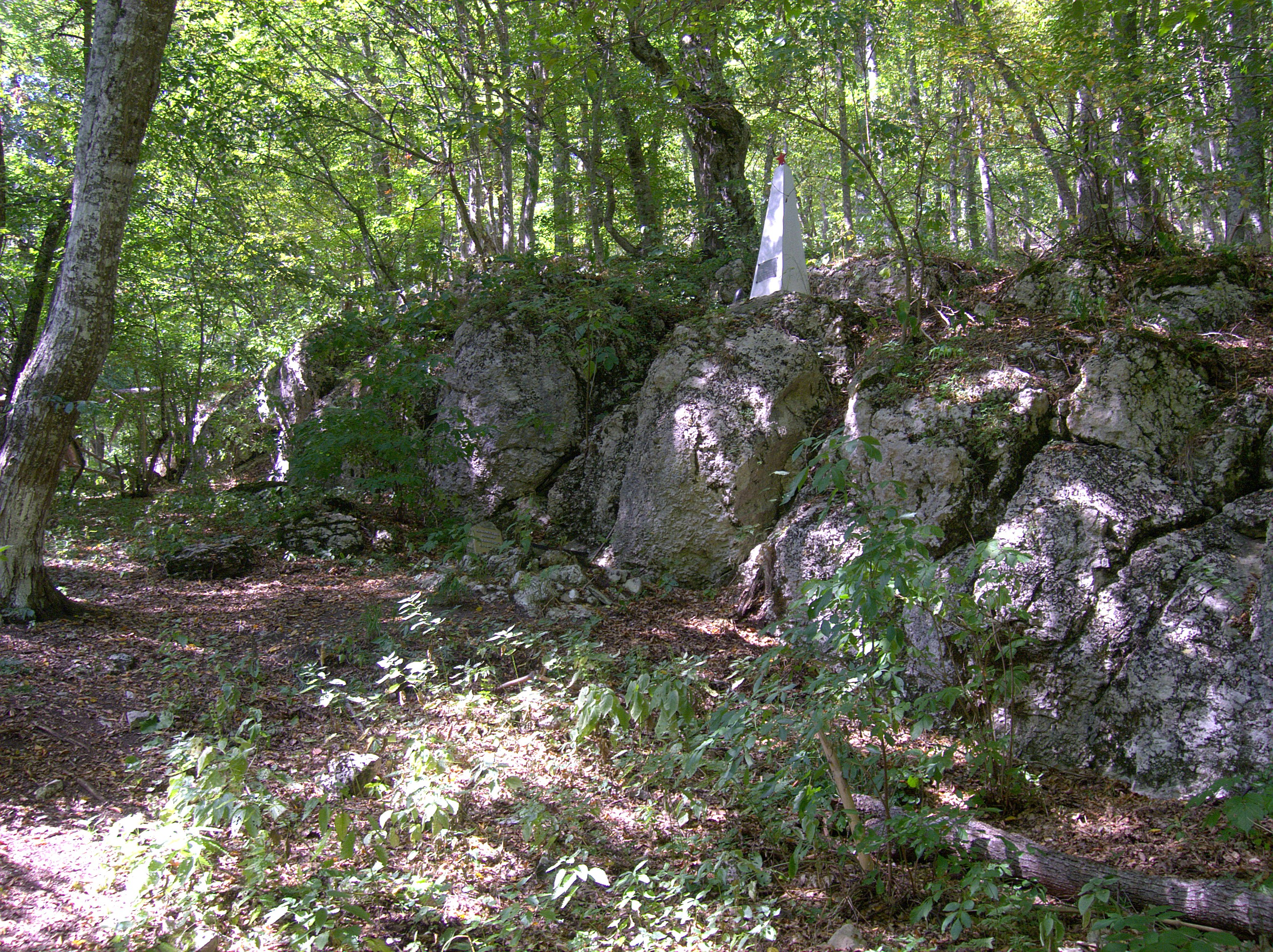
Place of exploit and heroic death on 24 July 1942 of Makar Khalansky, Leonid Chubarov, Nina Kostrubey

Down to the west, near the riverbed of Burulcha, there is a partisan mill 44.843056°N 34.424444°E. It was built by partisans Zavgorodny, Erokhin and Lebedev in 1942 and repeatedly updated by searchers.

Downstream you can find a monument at the site of the feat of partisans 44.846667°N 34.426667°E. The place of the exploit and heroic death of Khalansky Makar, Chubarov Leonid and military doctor Kostrubey Nina Petrovna on 24 July 1942.

Further downstream a partisan mine factory can be found.

Numerous plaques-dedications from labour collectives, Komsomol organisations, search teams are located all over the district.

The summit is approached by a number of tourist routes No. 145, No. 146 from the west, No. 147 from the east and No. 157 from the north-east. During the USSR, there was a special tourist route through the partisan sites. After the Annexation of Crimea by Russia, the traditions of patriotic education are being revived. During such hikes, monuments are also repaired.

== See also ==
- Crimea
- Crimean Mountains
- Crimean resistance during World War II

== Bibliography ==
- Шамко, В. И.; Шамко, Е. Н. (1986). По следам народного подвига. Simferopol: Таврия.
- Мальгин, А. В., ed. (2006). Партизанское движение в Крыму 1941—1942. Collection of documents. Simferopol: «Сонат», ГААРК. ISBN 966-8111-70-2.
- Тихомиров, Д. И.; Исаев, Д. В. (2010). Атлас туриста "Горный Крым". Kyiv: Картографія. p. 112.
- "Памятный знак партизанам-артиллеристам на горе Юки-Тепе («Высота 1025»)". Памятники и памятные места в Республике Крым, связанные с событиями Великой Отечественной войны 1941-1945 годов (PDF). Simferopol: Министерство внутренней политики, информации и связи Республики Крым, ГУП РК “Издательство и типография “Таврида“. 2016. Archived from the original (PDF) on 2021-04-25.
