= Abselâm Islâmov =

- Born: 1 April 1907; Tai-Vakuf village, Qarasuvbazar region, Russian Empire
- Died: 1 December 1995 (aged 88); Tashkent, Uzbekistan
- Known for: Serving as chief editor of the newspaper Lenin Bayrağı for 25 years
- Awards: Honored Culture Worker of the Uzbek SSR; Order of the Patriotic War; Order of the Red Star; Order of the Badge of Honour

Abselâm Islâmov (Russian: Абселям Ислямов; 1 April 1907 — 1 December 1995) was a Crimean Tatar party worker, commissar, and journalist. For 25 years, he was the chief editor of the Crimean Tatar language (Note: Lenin Bayrağı was a Crimean Tatar language newspaper published in the Uzbek SSR; however, Soviet magazine Zhurnalist labeled it as a Tatar language newspaper due to Soviet restrictions of the use of the term Crimean Tatar; the Crimean Tatar language is not a dialect of the Tatar language but a completely separate language.) newspaper Lenin Bayrağı. For his work, he was awarded the title Honored Culture Worker of the Uzbek SSR.

== Early life ==
Islâmov was born on 1 April 1907 in Tai-Vakuf village to an extremely poor Crimean Tatar family with many siblings. His family rented land from a landowner to run a farm, and what little money they had leftover went to food for the family. His parents and many of his siblings died in the famine of the 1920s, and he survived because he lived in the Subhi Children's Home at the time. He became a member of the Komsomol in 1923, and in 1930 he was admitted to the Communist Party. From 1929 to 1932 he attended the Frunze Pedagogical Institute of Crimea, which he graduated from with honors. He entered the Red Army in 1935, but until the start of the Great Patriotic War he did civilian work, working at the Higher Agricultural School and later the Institute for Mass Training of Activists. Throughout the 1930s he did many jobs, being an instructor at a regional Komsomol committee, the head of a department at the newspaper Qızıl Qırım, and worked at a pioneer youth magazine. His career in the Communist Party steadily grew in the latter part of the 1930s: he became the head of the Crimean branch of the Institute for the Training of Party Activists, and in 1938 he became a member of the Crimean Regional Party Control Commission. He was called up to the Red Army again in 1940, when many other political workers were mobilized. He taught economics at the Kachin Aviation School and was later sent to the Pavlograd Aviation School.

== World War II ==
During the war, Islâmov was the head of the political department of the 220th Fighter Aviation Division, which later became the 1st Guards Fighter Aviation Division. He was often praised by his commanders for his attentive work in educating pilots and journalism about the division. He ended the war with the rank of major, and was stationed in Dresden until 1946.

== Life in exile ==
From 1946 he lived in exile, he first lived in Samarkand, and worked as the head of the ideological department in the Samarkand Regional Party Committee. Later he was given an apartment in Tashkent. In 1957 he was charged with establishing the Crimean Tatar language newspaper Lenin Bayrağı and the given the position of editor-in-chief of the newly restarted newspaper; for 25 years, he was the chief editor of the newspaper. He worked hard to maintain the peace between editorial staff, which was complicated by the fact that Sharof Rashidov would frequently send him letters from staff denouncing each other. In addition to his work at the newspaper, he was elected as a deputy to the Supreme Soviet of the Uzbek SSR.

In 1977 he was awarded the title of Honored Worker of Culture of Uzbekistan; he retired in 1981 and died on 1 December 1995 in Tashkent, Uzbekistan. While he did not return to Crimea, his son Zemfir did move to Crimea after the fall of the Soviet Union.
