= Seit Tairov =

Soviet Crimean Tatar politician

- Born: 25 April 1928; Urkusta, Sevastopol, Crimean ASSR, RSFSR, USSR
- Died: 4 October 1989 (aged 61); Ordzhonikidze district, Tashkent Region, Uzbek SSR, USSR
- Awards: Hero of Socialist Labour

Seit Memetovich Tairov (Russian: Сеит Меметович Таиров; 25 April 1928 – 4 October 1989) was the highest-ranking Crimean Tatar politician in Soviet Union after the Sürgün, having risen to prominence as a leader in Akkurgan and then first secretary of the Jizzakh regional committee of the Communist Party. A controversial figure among Crimean Tatars today, he is remembered for his staunch opposition to full right of return to Crimea. As a public supporter of "taking root" in Uzbekistan, he was one of the top signatories of the notorious "Letter of Seventeen" in March 1968 that downplayed Crimean Tatar struggles and discrimination in exile and urged Crimean Tatars to avoid "succumbing" to desires to return to Crimea.

== Early life ==
Tairov was born on 25 April 1928 in Urkusta to a Crimean Tatar family. His father died young, leaving his mother Zera a widow. In 1937 he left his hometown to attend a boarding school in Simferopol. Like the rest of Crimean Tatar families in Crimea, he and his family were deported from Crimea in May 1944 on orders of the government after Crimean Tatars were universally brandished as traitors. Upon arrival as a special settler in Yangiyul he was assigned to working on a state grape farm. Several years later after being promoted to an accountant he met his future wife Leniyar, a fellow deported Crimean Tatar, at an apple farm. Her father Nuri Osmanov, a communist party secretary in Sudak, was shot by the Nazis during the war. Later they married and named their son Nuri in his honor.

== Career ==
Tairov's career in the communist party took off in the early 1950s after some of the more draconian restrictions on special settlers were lifted. Not long after graduating from the Tashkent Agricultural Institute he was admitted to the party in 1957, after which he began his political career in Akkurgan. Having started off as deputy chair of the district executive committee, he quickly rose up through the ranks of the party and received praise for the district exceeding cotton production quotas and achieving five-year plans early; previously the district was underdeveloped and labeled as "lagging behind" its counterparts in the republic. His career continued to grow after he signed the infamous "Letter of Seventeen", an open letter to the Crimean Tatar community published in Lenin Bayrağı in March 1968 urging them to stay in Uzbekistan and stop supporting the "provocations" of their civil rights activists. For his role in the development of Akkurgan he was awarded the title Hero of Socialist Labour in 1972 and received by Leonid Brezhnev when he visited the Uzbek SSR, who suggested that he be promoted to first secretary of the Jizzakh regional committee, which he began in 1973. As a result, Jizzakh became an industrial area with a sizable concentration of Crimean Tatars, but instead of rehabilitating the public image of Crimean Tatars and help right of return like many had hoped, the project had the opposite effect by further cementing the desires of the leadership of the Uzbek SSR to keep Crimean Tatars in Central Asia for economic reasons. In his capacity as secretary he publicly supported Crimean Tatar cultural initiatives such as the Haytarma dance ensemble, but described the group as "worse than the most seedy amateur circle" in a private letter to Sharof Rashidov. In addition to his regional positions he was a deputy in the Supreme Soviet of the USSR from 1974 to 1979 and a member of the Central Committee of the Communist Party of the Uzbek SSR.

== Later years and downfall ==
After being relieved of his post as first secretary of Jizzakh for financial corruption in 1978 he was briefly appointed as Minister of Forestry for the Uzbek SSR, but was forced to leave upon being expelled from the party not long afterward. He struggled to find a job, but was eventually made head of a small fruit nursery in Ordzhonikidze district. After the government came up with the idea for the Mubarek zone, accounts differ as to how supportive he was of the project but it is known that he categorically refused to move to the desolate area, despite being summoned by Rashidov, who offered him the opportunity to rehabilitate himself if he went along and moved to Mubarek. He died of a heart attack at the fruit nursery on 4 October 1989 and was buried in the Yangiyul cemetery.

== Awards ==
- Hero of Socialist Labour (14 December 1972)
- Two Order of Lenin (8 April 1971 and 14 December 1972)
- Order of the October Revolution (14 February 1975)
- Order of the Red Banner of Labour (1 March 1965)
