= Dzhebbar Akimov =

Soviet Crimean Tatar journalist and civil rights activist

- Born: 15 May 1909; Tuvaq village (now part of Alushta), Yaltinsky Uyezd, Taurida Governorate, Russian Empire
- Died: 21 July 1983 (aged 74); Bekabad, Uzbek SSR, USSR
- Citizenship: Soviet Union
- Occupation: Writer

Dzhebbar Akimov (Russian: Джеббар Акимович Акимов, Crimean Tatar: Cebbar Akim oğlu Akimov; 15 May 1909 – 21 July 1983) was a Crimean Tatar teacher, writer who worked as editor of the newspaper "Qızıl Qırım" (Red Crimea) until the Sürgün. In exile, stood at the origins of the Crimean Tatar rights movement, becoming the leader of the Bekabad initiative group as well as authoring many documents about their plight for which he was expelled from the party in 1966, dubbed "the most active supporter of returning to Crimea" by the government in 1967, and eventually sentenced to three years in prison in 1972. Like many other leaders of the original Crimean Tatar rights movement, he considered himself a communist and opposed the prospect of members of movement associating with Soviet dissidents like Andrey Sakharov and Pyotr Grigorenko.

== Early life ==
Akimov was born on 15 May 1909 to a Crimean Tatar family in Tuvaq village. A graduate of the Crimean Tatar Pedagogical College, he initially worked as a schoolteacher and then at the People's Commissariat for Education of the Crimean ASSR. Throughout the 1930s he translated major communist texts from Russian into the Crimean Tatar language, including the works of Lenin. From 1935 to 1941 he worked as director of the Crimean Educational and Pedagogical State Publishing House. Although he was arrested during the Great Purge, he was soon released after the death of Yezhov and allowed to become a party member in 1939. Later he became the chief editor of the newspaper Qızıl Qırım (Red Crimea) and a member of the Communist Party. Because of his position, he was evacuated from Crimea before German troops invaded the peninsula. He did not remain away from the frontlines for long, since he was deployed to Crimea in 1942 to help the local partisan movement. There, he helped write and translate various leaflets and information bulletins appealing to the Crimean population to aid the partisans. After the remaining German troops were expelled from Crimea in April 1944, he briefly returned to his post as head of the newspaper Qızıl Qırım. However, on 18 May 1944 when he and Seitumer Emir were on their way to the editing department for the newspaper so that they could have the day's issue of the newspaper published by morning, they were rudely accosted by armed NKVD soldiers, who were carrying out the deportation of Crimean Tatars in Crimea. When they tried to explain that they had a deadline to publish the newspaper, a soldier only sneered that it would be published without them. Up until being locked in the cattle cars with other Crimean Tatars sent for deportation to the Uzbek SSR, Akimov assumed that a mistake was being made and it would all be sorted out soon; but once he realized what was actually happening, he became devastated by the crime being committed against the Crimean Tatar people. Eventually he and his family arrived in Bekabad.

== In the Uzbek SSR ==
In his first years in exile, he worked as the deputy chief for political affairs of the Farhad railway. Later he worked as an economist-planner in various state institutions. In 1966 he joined a delegation of 65 Crimean Tatar representatives to appeal to the XXIII Party Congress in Moscow. In October that year he was expelled from the Communist Party for his efforts lobbying for right of return, which were described as "nationalist propaganda among the Crimean Tatars", having said he would continue to lobby for the right of return until it was allowed. Later on in January 1967 he was included in a list of Crimean Tatar civil rights activists the government was monitoring, which described him as "the most active supporter of returning to Crimea".

=== Trial ===
The KGB became aware that he attended a meeting in Margilan of regional initiative group leaders on 7–8 May 1972 as leader of the Bekabad initiative group. Trying to suppress any and all Crimean Tatar efforts to seek restoration of the Crimean ASSR and achieve right of return, the KGB further cracked down on their activities, and soon Akimov was arrested after black flags of mourning with the text «18 мая – день выселения крымских татар с родины» (English: 18 May - the day of the eviction of the Crimean Tatars from the homeland) were hung in Bekabad. Unable to find the person or persons who put up the flag, the authorities decided to arrest Akimov due to his status as a respected elder and figurehead in the movement. His home was searched on 9 August and he was subsequently arrested and taken to a KGB detention center. In later October his trial was held, with the charges being based on having leaflets detailing the situation of Crimean Tatars in USSR. During his trial he defended his statements about national policy directed at Crimean Tatars at the time being a deviation from proper Leninist national policy and statements about desiring return were the will and aspiration of the Crimean Tatar people. Despite Akimov's thorough arguments detailing the situation of Crimean Tatars, the prosecutor claimed that other Crimean Tatars were content with their position in the country away from Crimea, were not marginalized, and claimed that feelings otherwise were caused by incitement not legitimate grievances. Akimov's attorney did not attempt to defend the contents of the leaflets, but simply tried to claim that the state could not prove he wrote them, although Akimov admitted to contributing to them in court. On 28 November that year he was sentenced to three years incarceration in a general regime camp in Siberia. While in prison many Crimean Tatars wrote letters to the judicial system calling for his release.

=== Later life ===
Immediately after his release from prison he returned to the Crimean Tatar movement, helping prepare the "Cassation Statement" (which demanded the cancellation of all discriminatory decrees against Crimean Tatars, especially ones designed to prevent Crimean Tatars from obtaining a propiska in Crimea) before signing on to it. He continued his work as leader of the Bekabad initiative group, writing documents calling for right of return until his last days. As he lay bedridden from cancer, he received visits from other activists of the Crimean Tatar movement, giving them his last advice until he died on 22 July 1983. His funeral was held the next day and was attended by a huge crowd of fellow Crimean Tatars who travelled from various parts of the Uzbek SSR to say their final goodbyes and give eulogies.
