= Nazim Osmanov =

Soviet Crimean Tatar politician (1939–1985)

Nazim Seitkhalilovich Osmanov (Russian: Назим Сейтхалилович Османов; 28 April 1939 – 7 September 1985) was the first secretary of the Mubarek Communist Party Committee and a deputy of the Uzbek SSR Supreme Soviet. Born in Qarasuvbazar in 1939 but deported for being a Crimean Tatar in 1944, he grew up in exile in the Uzbek SSR; he initially worked as an agronomist in Shahrisabz, where he became a member of the Communist Party in 1968 before moving to Mubarek to support the Mubarek zone project, where his political career quickly took off. There, he became a member of the district executive committee, and then in November 1980 he became the first secretary of the Mubarek District party committee, although in August 1985 he moved on to the city party committee.
