= Refat Mustafaev =

Soviet Crimean Tatar politician, partisan, and civil rights activist

- Native name: Refat Şemsedin oğlu Mustafayev
- Born: 1908 or 1911; Büyük Yanköy, Taurida Governorate, Russian Empire
- Died: 24 May 1984; Andijan, Uzbek SSR, Soviet Union
- Allegiance: Soviet Union
- Branch: Red Army
- Rank: Captain
- Battles / wars: World War II
- Awards: Medal "To a Partisan of the Patriotic War" 1st class

Refat Mustafaev (Crimean Tatar: Refat Şemsedin oğlu Mustafayev, Russian: Рефат Шемсединович Мустафаев; 1911 – 1984) was a Crimean Tatar communist who served as a regional party secretary and battalion commissar in the Crimean resistance during World War II. After the Nazi troops were forced out of Crimea he was still subject to deportation to Kokand in the Surgun, forcing him to live away from him homeland of Crimea for the rest of his life because of his Crimean Tatar nationality. He was an activist for the right of return from the early days of the Crimean Tatar civil rights movement.
