= Gulnara Bekirova =

Crimean Tatar historian and writer

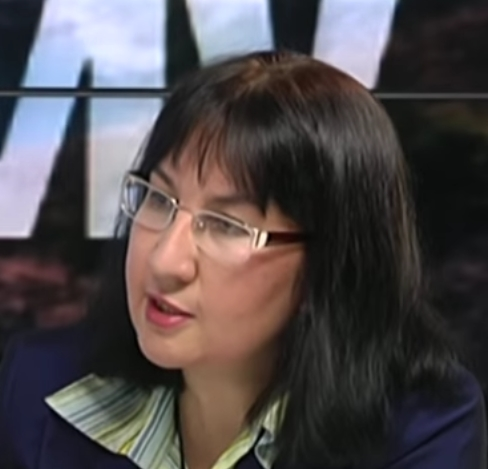
- Born: 21 February 1968 (age 58); Melitopol, Ukrainian SSR, USSR
- Education: Moscow Institute of History and Archives

Gulnara Tasimovna Bekirova (Russian: Гульнара Тасимовна Бекирова; born 21 February 1968) is a Crimean Tatar historian, writer, and member of PEN International. In her work as a historian she was a consultant in the creation of the movie "Haytarma". As a writer, she has produced numerous papers and books about interethnic relations of deported Crimean Tatars and their fate under Soviet, Ukrainian, and Russian governance. She has criticized Russian textbooks for depicting Crimean Tatars as inferior and supporting in xenophobic stereotypes of Crimean Tatars from the Soviet era. As an active writer for RadioFreeEurope she has written articles on krymr about the present situation in Crimea as well as the role of Crimean Tatars in the Red Army and the Crimean Tatar civil rights movement.
