= Yañı Dünya =

Crimean Tatar weekly newspaper published in Simferopol

Yañı Dünya Янъы дюнья
- Founded: 1918
- Language: Crimean Tatar
- Headquarters: 23/3 Gorky Street, Simferopol
- Circulation: c. 3,700 (2007)
- Website: www.yanidunya.org

Yañı Dünya (Crimean Tatar: Янъы дюнья, lit. 'New world') is a Crimean Tatar-language weekly newspaper, published in Simferopol. Its history dates back to 1918, when it was established in Moscow. In 2015, the newspaper was merged with the magazine Yildiz.

== History ==
The newspaper was founded in Moscow in 1918. Its first director was the Turkish Communist Mustafa Suphi. The newspaper was later moved to Simferopol, and in the late 1930s renamed to Qızıl Qırım (Crimean Tatar: Къызыл Къырым, lit. 'Red Crimea'). It was closed with the deportation of the Crimean Tatars in 1944, and refounded in 1957 in Tashkent with the name Lenin Bayrağı (Crimean Tatar: Ленин байрагъы, lit. 'Lenin's flag') as an organ of the Central Committee of the Communist Party of the Uzbek SSR.

The government planned on shutting down the newspaper because it felt that the Crimean Tatar language was not a real language, but the KGB eventually decided to continue allowing publication because Filipp Bobkov, a KGB official who was an enthusiast of postage stamps, remembered that before World War II, Crimean Tatars were featured on their own postage stamp in the Peoples of the Soviet Union postage stamp series.

In the 1970s, the newspaper was printed thrice a week with a circulation of 23,000. In June 1983, the government of the Uzbek SSR forbid the newspaper from using terms such as "Crimean ASSR", as well as Crimean Tatar names of towns such as "Aqmescit" for Simferopol, "Aqyar" for Sevastopol, and "Gezlev" for Yevpatoria in articles mentioning the birthplaces of Crimean Tatars featured in the newspaper.

In 1991, the newspaper returned to Simferopol and to its old name of Yañı Dünya.

In 2015, Zera Bekirova, who had been the chief editor for six years, resigned, citing political pressure on the newspaper. Seyran Suleyman became the new chief editor.

== Notable contributors ==
- Şamil Alâdin
- Mustafa Selimov
- Seitumer Emin
- Abselâm Islâmov
- Timur Daĝcı
- Ablâziz Veliyev
