= Şamil Alâdin =

Crimean Tatar writer and civil rights activist

- Şamil Seit oğlu Alâdin; Шамил Сеит огълу Алядин
- Born: Kamil; 12 July 1912; Mahuldür, Taurida Governorate, Russian Empire
- Died: 21 May 1996 (aged 83); Simferopol, Crimea, Ukraine
- Awards: Order of the Patriotic War; Order of the Badge of Honour (11 January 1957); Honored Worker of Culture of the Uzbek SSR (1973); Honoured Worker of Art of the Uzbek SSR (1982)

Şamil Alâdin (Crimean Tatar: Şamil Seit oğlu Alâdin, Russian: Шамиль Сеитович Алядинов, sometimes in English also Shamil Aladin; 12 July 1912 – 21 May 1996) was a Crimean Tatar writer, poet, translator, and civil rights activist. Early in his career he wrote poetry, later moving on to prose and nonfiction works.

== Early life and career ==
Alâdin was born on 12 July 1912 in Mahuldür to a Crimean Tatar family. His birth name was Kamil, but after falling badly ill as a young child he was given a new name, a custom based out of the ancient belief that renaming would help a child overcome an ailment. From then on his name was Şamil. Starting when he was very young he helped out on his family's farm, stacking firewood and planting tobacco. After primary education at a local school he attended a seven-year school in Bakhchisarai. There he developed a love for literature, and by the age of 15 his first poem to be published reached the pages of the Crimean Tatar newspaper "Yash Kuvet"; titled "Танъ бульбули" (The Nightingale of Dawn), it was dedicated to Ismail Gasprinsky, the Crimean Tatar enlightenment leader. After completing secondary school he entered the Simferopol Pedagogical College, where he studied from 1928 to 1931. He then went on to become a student at the correspondence department of the Moscow Literary Institute. In 1932 he published his first book of poems – "Топракъ кульди, кок кульди" (The Earth Smiled, the Sky Smiled). Later that year he was drafted into the Red Army, and by the end of his service in 1934 he was in command of a cavalry platoon. In 1935 he published "Къызыл казакънынъ йырлары" (Songs of the Red Cossack), a collection of poems inspired by his military years. The next year he became deputy editor of the Crimean Tatar newspaper "Янъы дюнья", but shortly thereafter he travelled to Dagestan to work as a schoolteacher and then to Tajikistan to work as an excavator in construction of the Farkhad Dam as part of a 5-year plan. In 1939 he returned to Crimea, that year becoming a member of the Union of Writers of the USSR and head of the Union of Writers of Crimea. His first prose work "Омюр" (Life) was published in 1940.

== World War II and exile ==
Almost immediately after the German invasion of the Soviet Union, he volunteered to join the Red Army. After re-entering the military on 26 June 1941 he was made a platoon commander on the South-Western Front. Severe injuries sustained in February 1943 confined him to a hospital for two and a half months, but he was eventually released and sent to the headquarters of the North Caucasian Front, then to the headquarters of the Crimean partisan movement. In April 1944 he returned to Simferopol and was a member of the commission to assess the extent of the damage caused to Crimea by the war. Just a few days before the deportation he went to Alushta to recruit people for the Haytarma ensemble. When he returned to Simferopol he could not find his wife Fatima and young daughter Dilyara anywhere, since they had already been deported to Uzbekistan. He travelled to Central Asia to search for them, and when he found them in Chinabad they were ill from hunger, which afflicted many deported people. He lived with his family in Chinabad for about four months before getting permission to move to Andijan, where he worked for a local newspaper. In May 1945 they got permission to move to Tashkent, after Alâdin's friend Aleksandr Fadeev, chairman of the Union of Writers of the USSR helped him get permission to move. While in Tashkent he directed a theater, the palace of railway workers, and became executive secretary of the board for the Union of Writers of the Uzbek SSR. From 1953 to 1957 he studied at the Tashkent Pedagogical Institute, after which he became highly involved in the Crimean Tatar civil rights movement. He travelled with delegations to Moscow and composed letters to the Central Committee of the Communist Party requesting the right of return – which was granted to most deported nations, including Chechens, Kalmyks, and Karachays, but not Crimean Tatars. Because of his activism he was repeatedly fired from his publishing jobs, but he eventually managed to secure permission to create a Crimean Tatar language newspaper in exile (Lenin Bayrağı) as well as getting Crimean Tatar broadcasts on airwaves. From 1980 to 1985 he headed the "Yildiz" magazine, and at the peak of his career he worked with many prominent Uzbeks including Komil Yashin and Sharaf Rashidov.

He was a collaborator in the organization and promotion of the Mubarek zone project created to resettle Crimean Tatars in the arid Qashqadaryo in lieu of seeking return to Crimea.

== Later life ==
After retiring in 1985 he worked on a novel about Tugay Bey but left it incomplete. Having finally returned from exile to Crimea in 1994 he wrote essays on political matters including "Victims of the Kremlin" and "I Am Your Tsar and God". He died on 21 May 1996 and was buried in the Abdal cemetery.

== Accolades ==
- Order of the Patriotic War 2nd class (11 March 1985)
- Order of the Badge of Honour (11 January 1957)
- Honored Worker of Culture of the Uzbek SSR (1973)
- Honored Worker of Art of the Uzbek SSR (1982)
- Medal "For Labour Valour" (1970)
- Medal "For Distinguished Labour" (1971)
- Medal "Veteran of Labour" (1978)
