= Yaltinsky Uyezd =

Yaltinsky Uyezd (Ялтинский уезд) was one of the subdivisions of the Taurida Governorate of the Russian Empire. It was situated in the southern part of the governorate, in southern Crimea. Its administrative centre was Yalta.

== Demographics ==
At the time of the Russian Empire Census of 1897, Yaltinsky Uyezd had a population of 73,260. Of these, 59.0% spoke Crimean Tatar, 27.1% Russian, 5.4% Greek, 2.8% Ukrainian, 1.5% Turkish, 0.9% Armenian, 0.6% Polish, 0.4% German, 0.3% Belarusian, 0.1% French, 0.1% Estonian and 0.1% Czech as their native language.
