= Crimean resistance during World War II =

Underground resistance movement against Nazi Germany in the Crimean peninsula

Crimean resistance movement
- Flag of the Crimean Autonomous Soviet Socialist Republic, the de jure government of Crimea throughout World War II
- Leaders: Various: (Note: The Crimean resistance movement was decentralised, and many people have been described as "leaders" of the movement, such as Simferopol underground leader Abdulla Dagci and Kerch Peninsula leader Ivan Kozlov. This list refers only to commanders of the Crimean Headquarters of the Partisan Movement, a department of the Central Headquarters of the Partisan Movement.): Alexei Mokrousov (1941–1942); Georgy Seversky (1942); Pyotr Seleznyov (1942–1943); Vladimir Bulatov (1943–1944)
- Dates active: 1941–1944
- Ideology: Various: Anti-fascism; Primary: Marxism-Leninism; Stalinism

The Crimean resistance movement during World War II refers to various decentralised groups who resisted the occupation of Crimea by Nazi Germany during World War II. Also often referred to by the term Crimean partisans, the resistance movement in the Crimean peninsula formed a significant part of the Soviet partisan movement during World War II, and included many of the peninsula's various ethnic groups, such as Russians, Ukrainians, Crimean Tatars, and Greeks.

== Establishment and early efforts (1941) ==
Following the beginning of Operation Barbarossa, preparations began for the establishment of a partisan movement in the Crimean peninsula in the case it were to fall into the hands of the German authorities.

The first Crimean partisan organisation was established in early October 1941, at an underground centre of the Communist Party of the Soviet Union in the eastern Crimean city of Kerch. Ivan Kozlov, Vasily Kolesnichenko, and Ye. V. Yefimova were the organisers of the centre. In other cities throughout the peninsula, remnants of the Communist Party organised in cities such as Sevastopol, Simferopol, Bilohirsk (then known as Karasubazar), and Yalta, as well as the Krasnohvardiiske Raion. From this, 24 partisan detachments were formed. Shortly following the establishment of the detachments, an influx of Soviet military personnel occurred, further increasing their numbers.

On 23 October 1941, the Crimean Headquarters of the Partisan Movement was established under the leadership of Alexei Mokrousov. 2 million rubles were allocated for materiel costs. By 20 November 1941, 28 partisan detachments existed, consisting of 3,734 people, of whom 1,316 had previously been military personnel. Around 1,000 were additionally members of the Komsomol. The Crimean Headquarters of the Partisan Movement was divided into five districts:

1. The Crimean Submediterranean forest complex's eastern portion, centred around Sudak and Staryi Krym.
2. The Crimean Submediterranean forest complex's western portion, centred around Karasubazar.
3. Central Crimea.
4. Bakhchysarai and Yalta.
5. Sevastopol.

In addition to these five districts, three partisan detachments operated in the Kerch Peninsula.

The first confrontation between German forces and Crimean partisans was on 3 November 1941, when the Ichkinsky partisan detachment engaged German and Romanian forces at the Lower Kok-Asan, near Karasubazar. The five-hour battle ended in a victory for the partisans, allowing an NKVD detachment and military hospital to escape to the coast. Following the battle, they fled to the Crimean Mountains. Today a monument exists where the battle occurred.

The Crimean partisans were dealt a significant blow in December 1941 when the Yalta partisan detachment was attacked by Romanian forces. According to later Soviet reports, 175 partisans were killed, 200 were wounded, and 73 went missing, including Dmitry Averkin, commander of the fourth district. Averkin was later found dead near the Beş Tekne spring in the Crimean Mountains.

== Landing support and airlifts (1941–1942) ==
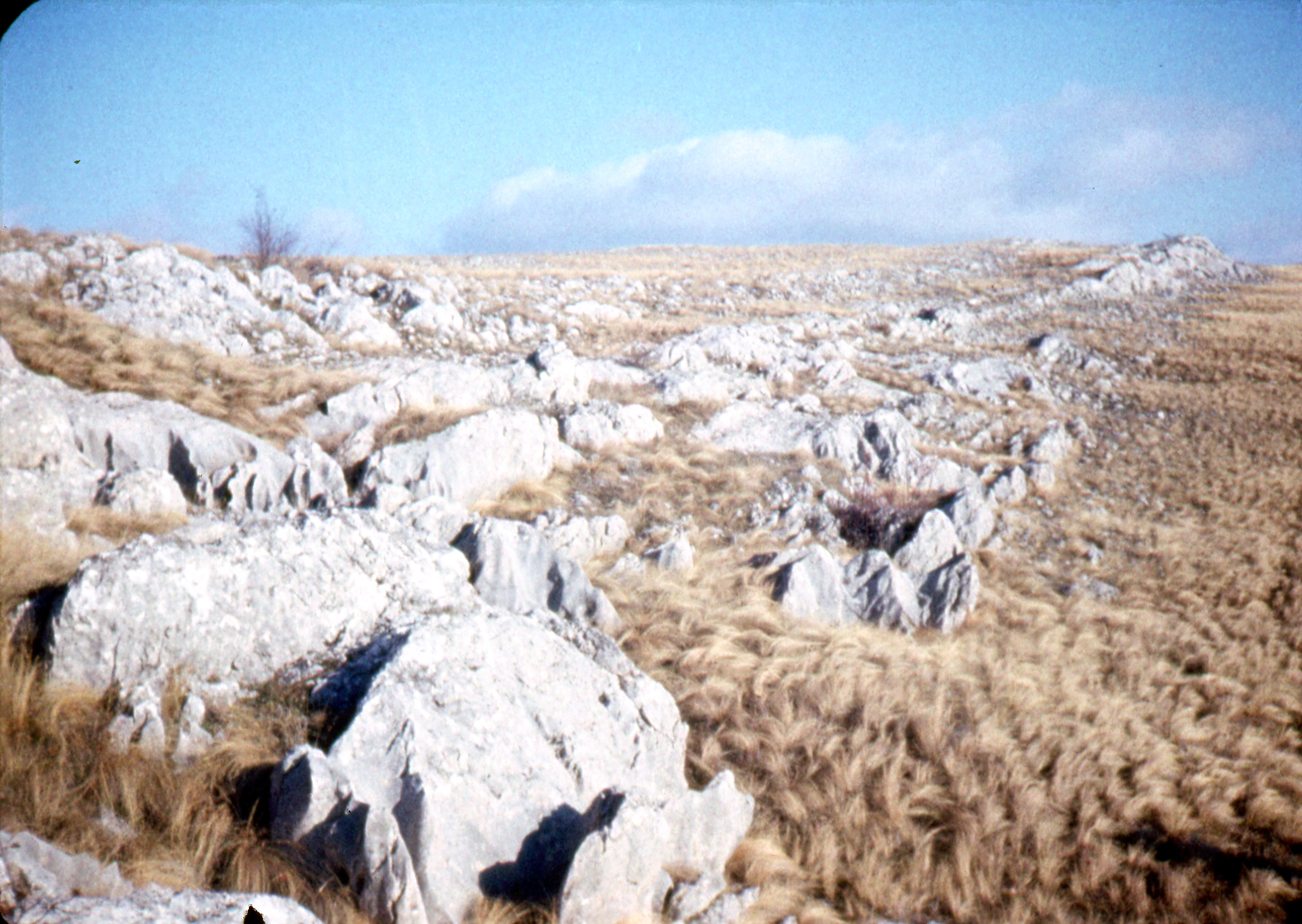
Qarabiy yayla, pictured here in 1990, functioned as an airfield for the Crimean partisans

During the Battle of the Kerch Peninsula, the V. I. Lenin and I. V. Stalin partisan detachments provided assistance to Red Army forces, launching attacks on German forces and helping to hold landing sites. Basan Gorodovikov's 15th detachment, working with the 10th detachment, launched an attack on Gestapo officers fleeing the city of Feodosia, killing 64. Partisans also participated in the Yevpatoria assault. By April 1942, with Germany completely occupying Crimea, it became evident that coordination of partisan activity was necessary. Ivan Genov, a partisan military commander in Crimea during the Russian Civil War, was placed in charge of organising and expanding the partisan movement in April 1942. 34 partisan leaders were dispersed throughout Crimea in order to foment resistance in the peninsula's cities and districts. Further underground party structures were established in Simferopol, Feodosia, and Karasubazar.

By mid-July 1942, there were 2,217 partisans in Crimea's forests. At the same time, partisans were fighting German forces at the defense of the Adzhimushkay quarry. Around mid-1942, stable communications with partisans were established by Red Army forces, and efforts to supply them by air began. The North Caucasian Front was instructed by the Soviet military command to begin the process of assisting the partisans by evacuating the wounded and providing supplies. Semyon Budyonny, commander of the North Caucasian Front, personally took part in creating plans to supply the Crimean partisans.

In order to facilitate the reception of aid, an impromptu air field was created by the partisans in the Crimean Mountains, in the Qarabiy yayla mountain range. The first flight landed on 28 September 1942, and flights continued until the peninsula was fully recaptured by the Soviets. In total, more than 450 people were evacuated, and 240 tonnes of cargo were delivered.

== Reorganisation and liberation (1942–1944) ==
Beginning in 1942, activities were taken out by the Central Headquarters of the Partisan Movement to reorganise local partisan movements and introduce further discipline. Mokrousov was recalled to Moscow and placed on trial for extrajudicial executions. Significant debate exists between historians as to whether there was truth to these claims or if Mokrousov was framed.

Following Mokrousov's removal, leadership of the Crimean resistance movement changed hands several times. On 3 August 1942, the Crimean and North Caucasian Headquarters of the Partisan Movement were merged into the Southern Headquarters of the Partisan Movement, under the leadership of Pyotr Seleznyov. Under the Southern Headquarters of the Partisan Movement, the Crimean Regional Committee re-established itself underground with Genov as its leader, and by early 1943, more than 1,300 people across 106 underground organisations were actively participating in the resistance. In June 1943, the Crimean Headquarters of the Partisan Movement was re-established. Vladimir Bulatov was made commander.

On 19 October 1943, the scheduled date of a wide-reaching deportation from Kerch by German forces, a detachment was formed consisting of 130 local youths. The detachment was active in the Kerch–Eltigen operation, engaging in combat with German and Romanian troops and killing at least 600. However, their commander, P. I. Nestorov, was captured in February 1944 and executed. German forces additionally sealed quarries where partisans were hiding, trapping them inside. The surviving partisans linked up with the Red Army on 11 April 1944.

Crimean partisans also participated in the Rail War, a campaign of sabotage of German rail connections. At Baherove train station, the furnaces of five locomotives were blown up with mines. In Nyzhnohirskyi, an artillery depot and warehouse was bombed, killing 30 German soldiers.

German military leadership in Crimea understood that with spring would come a new Soviet offensive. Therefore, Erwin Jaenecke ordered an anti-partisan operation in the Crimean Mountains. Romanian generals Ioan Dumitrache and Leonard Mociulschi of the Third Army were placed in charge of the operation, leading to the deaths of 3,700 partisans per Romanian sources. German sources estimated that around 7,000-8,000 partisans were in the Crimean Mountains in November 1943, though Soviet documentation places the total number of partisans around 4,000-5,000.

With the beginning of the Crimean offensive, the partisans took on a significant role in the peninsula's recapture. Simferopol, Karasubazar, and Staryi Krym were recaptured on 13 April 1944. Two days later, Yalta and Alushta were recaptured. By 12 May 1944, German troops had been completely forced from Crimea, bringing an end to the war in the peninsula.

== Role in the war effort ==
Following the war's conclusion, Marshal of the Soviet Union Aleksandr Vasilevsky praised the Crimean partisans for their role in bringing about the success of the Crimean offensive. Soviet partisan leader Panteleimon Ponomarenko also praised the partisans, noting that they carried out 3,226 actions against the occupation of Crimea, including 252 battles. In addition to military activities, the Crimean partisans published 213 pro-Soviet newspapers, leaflets, and other agitation activities, altogether having a circulation of 3 million copies. Six members of the resistance from Crimea were awarded the title of Hero of the Soviet Union, 14 were awarded the Order of Lenin, and 17 were awarded the Order of the Red Banner. 3,000 members of the resistance, including 1,500 partisans, were awarded by the Soviet Union for their actions.

== See also ==
- Crimea
- Crimean offensive
- Siege of Sevastopol (1941–1942)
- Yuke-Tepe (1025)
