= Akmesdzhyt Friday Mosque =

Mosque in Simferopol, Crimea

Coordinates: 44°55′43″N 34°08′18″E

- Акъмесджит Джума Джамиси
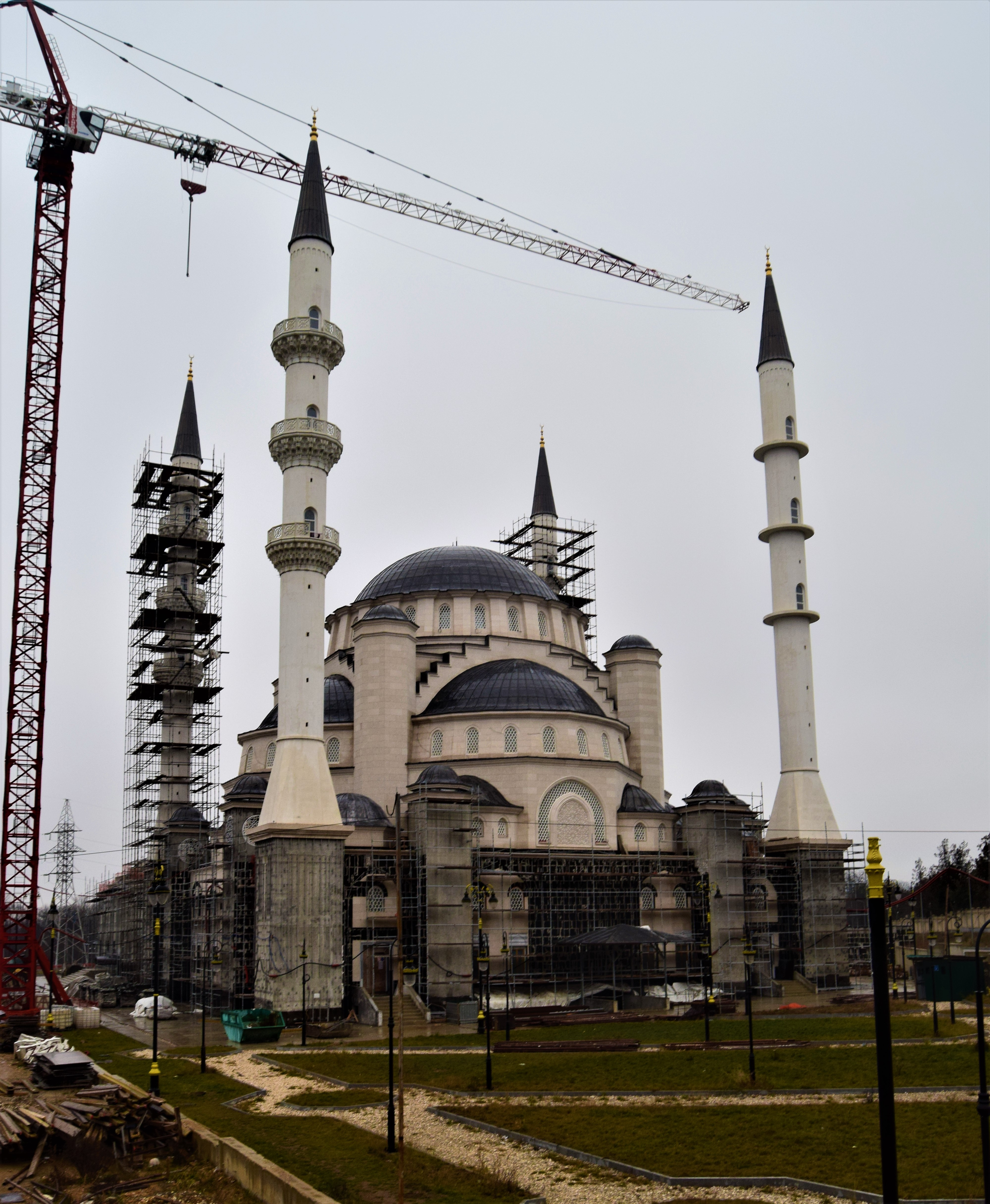
- Aqmescit Friday mosque under construction

Religion
- Affiliation: Islam
- Rite: Sunni
- Status: Active

Location
- Location: Simferopol
- Interactive map of Akmesdzhyt Friday Mosque

Architecture
- Architects: Idris Yunusov, Emil Yunusov
- Type: Mosque
- Style: Islamic, Crimean Tatar architecture
- Groundbreaking: 2015
- Completed: 2024

Specifications
- Capacity: 3,000
- Dome height (outer): 28 m (92 ft)
- Minaret: 4
- Minaret height: 58 m (190 ft)

Akmesdzhyt Friday Mosque, (Note: Crimean Tatar: Акъмесджит Джума Джамиси, romanized: Aqmescit Cuma Camisi.) also known as the Great Friday Mosque, (Note: Crimean Tatar: Бюйюк Джума Джамиси, romanized: Büyük Cuma Camisi; Russian: Больша́я собо́рная мече́ть, romanized: Bol'sháya sobórnaya mechét', Ukrainian: Велика соборна мечеть, romanized: Velyka soborna mechet'.) and the Simferopol Cathedral Mosque, (Note: Russian: Симферо́польская собо́рная мече́ть, romanized: Simferópol'skaya sobórnaya mechét', Ukrainian: Сімферопольська соборна мечеть, romanized: Simferopols'ka soborna mechet'.) is the largest mosque in Simferopol (Aqmescit), Crimea, which had been under construction since 2015 after 2014 Russian annexation of Crimea. It opened on 9 December 2023.

It is the main mosque of Crimea and the spiritual administration of the Muslims of Crimea.

== History ==
The Crimean Tatar autochthonous people of Crimea had been facing sought permission to build a mosque on the location of the current site since 1996, but the requests were rejected by the Sevastopol City Council for various reasons (a positive decision was made in 2004, but this was rolled back in 2008), which occasionally proposed to change the location from Yalta Highway 22 to Lugovaya Street 6. In January 2008 the Crimean Tatars erected a tent city on the location in protest of the inaction of the council and began to transport around 100,000 limestone pieces to the site.

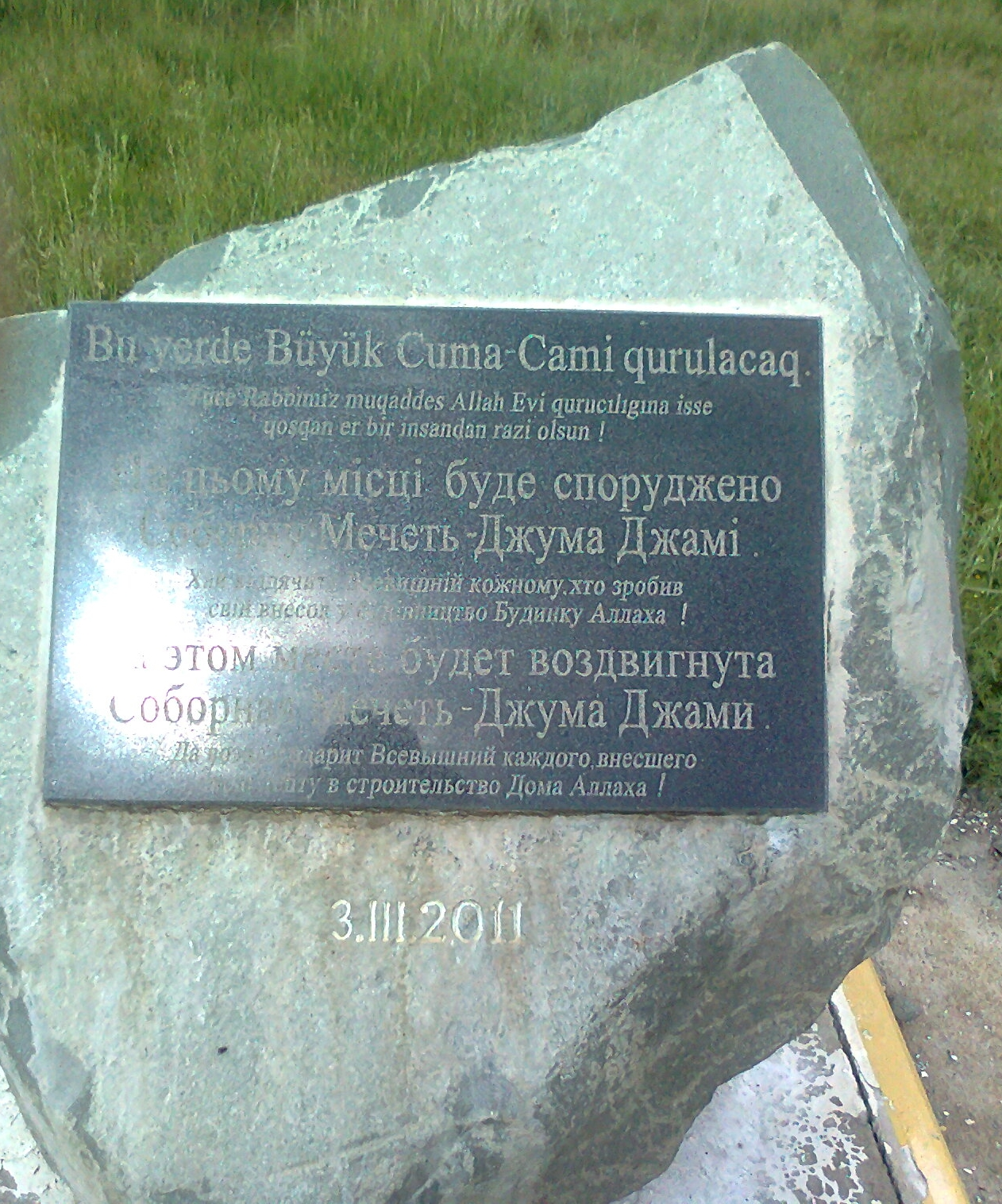
The stone plaque installed at the site on 3 March 2011

When in February 2008 the Economic Court of the Autonomous Republic of Crimea demanded that the city council issue a construction permit for the location along the Yalta Highway, the then head of Aqmescit (Simferopol), Gennady Babenko, declared:

Firstly, the decision of the Economic Court [of Crimea] has not yet entered into force, and, of course, we will certainly appeal. And secondly, the absolute majority of city residents insistently demand that there should be a forest park zone... If other religious confessions raised questions about the construction of their temples in the protected zone, near the reservoir, from which we actually drink water, our attitude towards them would be exactly the same. Contact the environmentalists, contact the water resources management department — they will tell you everything and show you. It's actually about people's health and lives, you see?

— Gennady Babenko, Head of Aqmescit (Simferopol), March 2008

In October 2009, the New York Times reported on the project and the local divisions connected to it among the locals, such as citing Crimean Tatar concerns that the city would not follow through on promises to grant permits in the proposed alternative locations and accusing it of NIMBYism. Mejlis of the Crimean Tatar People member Refat Chubarov was quoted saying that the mosque project was expected to cost more than $10 million, most of which would be provided by Turkish and other foreign donors.

Finally, on 15 February 2011 the City Council relented and voted to issue a construction permit to the Spiritual Direction of the Muslims of Crimea for the 2.8-hectare (6.9-acre) plot, and the Crimean Tatars placed a large memorial stone on the location of the future mosque in March. However, the construction was scheduled to begin only in April 2014 to correspond with a summit between the presidents of Ukraine and Turkey, who would also unveil the construction site. The project was then postponed due to the Russian annexation.

Construction works started in September 2015, with the deadline moved multiple times from early 2020 to 2021. In September 2015, the partially-recognised Grand Mufti of Crimea, Emirali Ablayev announced that the construction project would be funded by Turkish authorities and built by a Turkish construction company. However, private donations from local and Russian donors were also raised.

== Art style ==
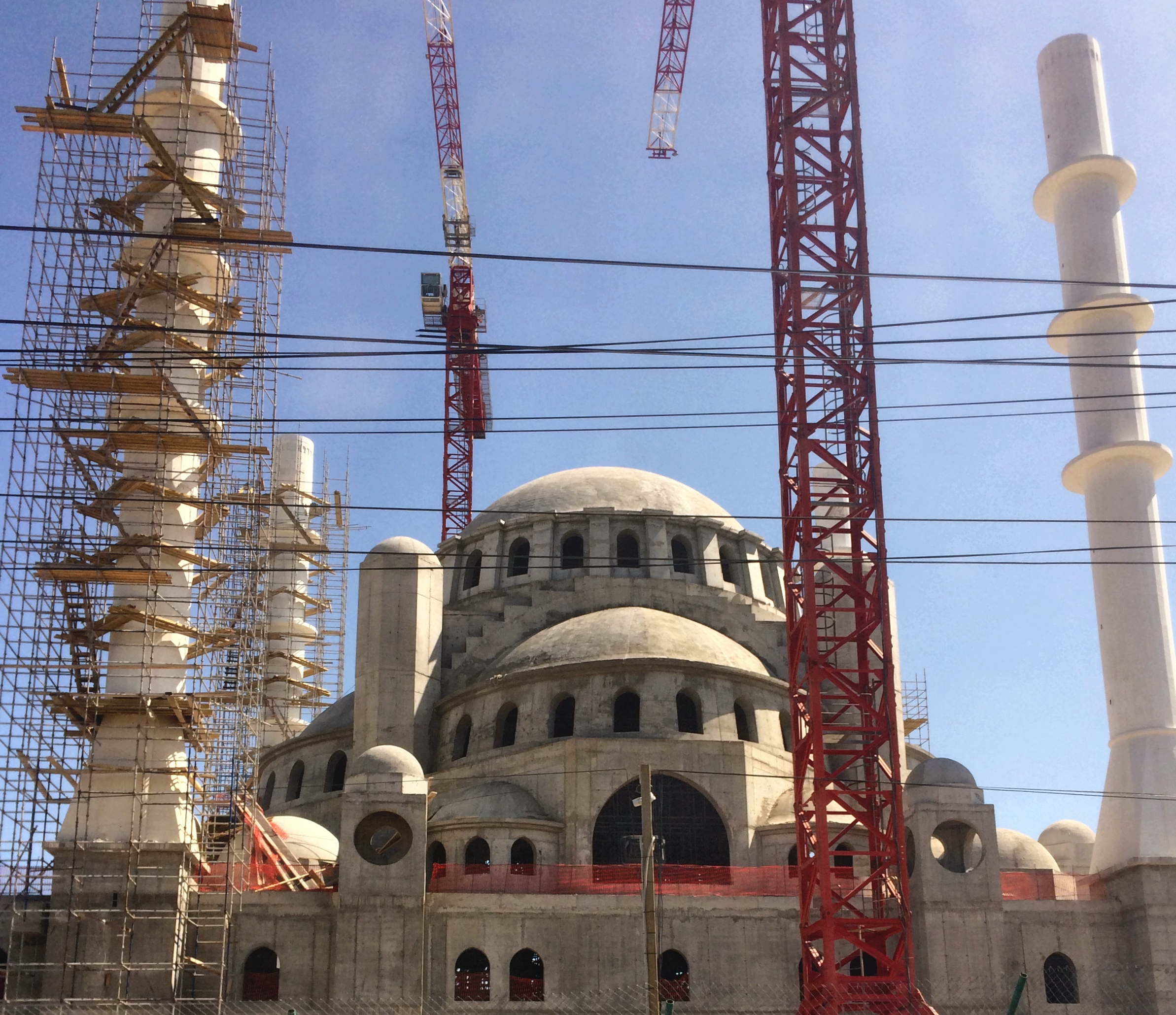
Construction of the cathedral mosque in Simferopol (August 2018)

The Aqmescit Friday Mosque is said to be a unique structure that is a blend of various architectural styles. The cathedral mosque follows the cross-dome layout that is typical of Byzantine architecture and is inspired by the Hagia Sophia, with the dome resting on a square of semi-domes. The Juma-Jami mosque in Evpatoria is another inspiration for the mosque's design, which also borrows heavily from the Ottoman style. The mosque's chief architect, Idris Yunusov, combined the Ottoman and European Baroque styles, also known as the Ottoman Baroque, to create a distinctive architectural style for the mosque.

The tulip is a significant symbol in the design of the mosque, with the tulip style being a common feature in Ottoman architecture. The tulip, along with other flowers, is an essential part of the tulip style and is often seen in the gardens and fountains of buildings built in this style. The Simferopol Cathedral Mosque also features a rich flower garden, park area, galleries, and a fountain as part of its design. While the tulip style is often associated with the Ottoman era, the Kazan designers who worked on the mosque tried to incorporate authentic Crimean Tatar ornaments from the region's clothes to make the mosque's decorative symbols unique to the Crimean Tatars.

The mosque's design has not been without controversy. The use of the tulip style as a promotional symbol for the Crimean Tatar people has been criticized, as the tulip is a symbol of the Ottoman era of tulips and not a specifically Crimean Tatar symbol. Some of the mosque's designers were replaced by Kazan masters, who incorporated authentic Crimean Tatar designs from traditional clothing into the mosque's decoration. Nevertheless, the tulip style is still dominant in the mosque's design, including all the stained-glass windows and a significant part of the painting.

The mosque is constructed of reinforced concrete, and marble was used for its facing, with the dome covered with 20 tons of lead. The height of the dome is 28 meters, and the mosque has four minarets that have a distinct Ottoman influence. The mosque is not the only building in the area, with administrative and guest buildings nearby that are constructed in various styles. The guest house is a 19th-century building that is a blend of Moroccan, classical architecture, and the South Coast Crimean Tatar style.
