= Index of articles related to Crimean Tatars =

Below is the list of articles related to Crimean Tatars

Historical flag of the Crimean Tatar people

== History and ethnogenesis ==
Crimean Tatar subethnic groups - Crimean Khanate - Crimean People's Republic - Crimean Tatar diaspora - Crimean Tatar language - Crimean Tatar dialects - Crimean Tatars - Cumania - Dobrujan Tatars (Tatars of Romania and Tatars in Bulgaria) - Golden Horde - Kipchaks - Lipka Tatars - Mongol Empire - Nogais - Tatars

== Geography ==
Aqmescit - Aqyar - Azov - Azov Sea - Bağçasaray - Çufut Qale - Gözleve - Karasubazar - Kefe - Hansaray - Or Qapı - Taurida Governorate

== People ==
Refat Appazov - Ismail Bulatov - Noman Çelebicihan - Emir Chalbash - Bekir Çoban-zade - Mustafa Dzhemilev - Ismail Gaspıralı - Jamala - Kenan Kutub-zade - Mansur Mazinov - Musa Mamut - Yuri Osmanov - Abdraim Reshidov - Ayshe Seitmuratova - Amet-khan Sultan - Seit Tairov

== Exile and politics ==
Deportation of the Crimean Tatars - Self-immolation - Ukaz 493 - Mubarek zone - Letter of Seventeen - Mejilis - ATR - Crimean ASSR - Detatarization of Crimea - Tatarophobia - Annexation of Crimea - UDTTMR
