= Spiritual Administration of the Muslims of Crimea =

Religious organization in Crimea

Spiritual Administration of Muslims of Crimea
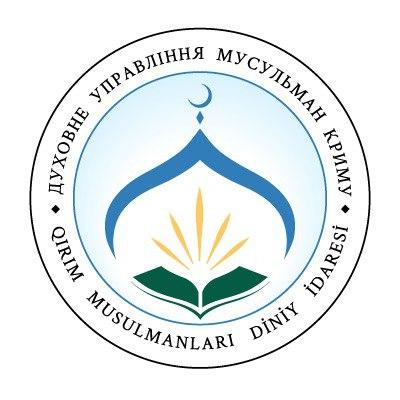
- Type: Non-profit organization;
- Legal status: Active
- Purpose: Provides religious and educational services for the Muslim community.
- Headquarters: Muslim Association of Ukraine, Kyiv
- Location: Peremohy Ave, 67, Kyiv, 03062
- Region served: Ukraine
- Official language: Ukrainian; Qırımtatarca; Arabic; English; Turkish; Russian
- Mufti: Ayder Rustemov
- Website: Official Website

The Spiritual Administration of Muslims of Crimea (RAMC, Crimean Tatar: Qırım Musulmanları Diniy İdaresi, QMDİ; Ukrainian: Духовне Управління Мусульман Криму, ДУМК) is the central religious administrative body for Muslims in Crimea. It was established in 1991.

In 2016, the Spiritual Administration of Muslims of Crimea, due to 2014 Russian annexation of Crimea, was recreated in Kyiv, the capital of Ukraine.

The organization publishes its own literature and a daily newspaper called “Hidiaet,” in the Tatar language.
