= Ismail Bulatov =

Soviet Crimean Tatar major general (1902–1975)

- Native name: İsmail Bulat oğlu Bulatov; Исмаил Булатович Булатов
- Born: 28 February 1902; Yevpatoria, Taurida Governorate, Russian Empire
- Died: 25 September 1975 (aged 73) Odessa, Ukrainian SSR, USSR
- Service years: 1924 – 1946
- Rank: Major-General
- Conflicts: World War II
- Awards: Order of the Red Banner (3)

Ismail Bulatov (Crimean Tatar: İsmail Bulat oğlu Bulatov, Russian: Исмаил Булатович Булатов; 28 February 1902 – 25 September 1975) was a Crimean Tatar general in the Red Army during World War II. Having been a lieutenant colonel at the start of the conflict, he rose through the ranks to major-general and became the deputy commander of the 21st Army, in which he led troops through Berlin. After the war he had to resign from the military due to his health, and despite his long military service as an officer he was never able to return to homeland of Crimea, living in Odessa for the remainder of his life. His brother, Zekery Bulatov, was also not deported in 1944 due to active service in the military, but also could not reside in Crimea after the war and lived in Kattakurgan.

== Early life ==
Bulatov was born on 28 February 1902 to an impoverished Crimean Tatar family in Yevpatoria. Due to the early death of his father he became the breadwinner of the family while still in school. After completing his initial schooling he attended a rabfak, and moved to Simferopol before entering the military. Upon entering the military he entered a two-year military-political academy in Kazan. He then graduated and was assigned as a company political officer before rising through the ranks to regimental commissar and executive head of the party bureau in the 23rd Rifle Division. From 1933 to 1937 he studied at the Leningrad Military-Political Academy, after which he remained at the academy as a faculty member before becoming commissar of the 39th Rifle Division. Later he was assigned to the 120th Rifle Division.

== World War II ==
During the initial phase of the defense of the Soviet Union against operation barbarossa, Bulatov was stationed in Orel with the rest of the 120th Rifle Division. From July to August they launched counterattacked as part of the Yelnya Offensive, but after stopping enemy advances the division was transferred to the reserve in September. It soon reemerged as the 6th Guards Rifle Division, having been awarded the guards designation by Red Army leadership for valor in the battle for Yelnya. During the battle, Bulatov always remained on the front line, for which he was awarded the Order of the Red Banner and promoted to colonel. Later that year he saw combat in the Oryol-Tula area, to prevent German troops from reaching Moscow. In December he participated in the battle that took back Yefremov from enemy control. Later that winter he was wounded by shell fragments in the head, but remained in combat, taking command of the division after general Konstantin Petrov died from wounds sustained in action.

In 1942 Bulatov and general Vyacheslav Tsvetaev were assigned to the 10th Reserve Army, which trained more than 20 divisions that went on to fight on the Stalingrad, Don, and Southwestern Fronts. In December that year the unit was renamed the 5th Shock Army and sent to the Stalingrad Front. Later that month the 5th Shock Army was incorporated into the Southwestern Front, but less than two weeks later it was put in the Southern Front on 3 January 1943. There, the unit fought in the battles for Rostov-on-Don, Donbass, Melitopol, Nikolaev, and Odessa. In March that year Bulatov was promoted to the rank major-general. In June 1944 he was appointed as deputy rear commander of the 10th Guards Army, which was stationed on the Baltic Front. The previous month, his nation had been collectively deported from Crimea to Central Asia, declared "enemies of the people", and deprived and many civil rights. Since Bulatov was an officer in the Red Army, he was spared deportation in May 1944, but he was still treated like a second-class citizen after the war. In January 1945 he became the deputy rear commander of the 21st Army on the 2nd Belorussian Front, and participated in the battles for Koenigsberg and Berlin.

== Postwar ==
After the end of the war Bulatov remained in the military until having to retire in January 1946 for health reasons. Despite having been a loyal member of the Red Army throughout the entire war, his Crimean Tatar ethnicity meant that he could not return to his hometown. For the remainder of his life he lived in Odessa, where he was a member of the regional council. After he died on 25 September 1975 he was buried in the Tairovsky cemetery.

== Awards ==
- Three Order of the Red Banner
- Order of Kutuzov 2nd class
- Order of Bogdan Khmelnitsky 2nd class
- campaign and jubilee medals
