= List of Crimean Tatars =

A partial list of notable Crimean Tatars, in alphabetical order:

== Military personnel ==
- Alime Abdenanova – Soviet spy during World War II
- Teyfuq Abdul – battalion commander in the Red Army during World War II; Hero of the Soviet Union
- Seitnebi Abduramanov – platoon commander in the Red Army during World War II
- Uzeir Abduramanov – sapper in the Red Army during World War II; Hero of the Soviet Union
- Fetislyam Abilov – regiment commander during World War II; belatedly declared Hero of the Soviet Union in 1990
- Umer Adamanov – partisan detachment leader who defended Polish villages from the SS
- Ismail Bulatov – Major-general
- Emir Chalbash – flying ace
- Abdulla Dagci – commander of partisan detachment during World War II
- Dzhevdet Dermendzhi – infantry officer, nominated for title Hero of the Soviet Union
- Nuri Dzhelilov – tank officer, nominated for title Hero of the Soviet Union
- Amet-khan Sultan – flying ace, test pilot, and double Hero of the Soviet Union
- Refiyîk Kadír – dobrujan-born Crimean Tatar officer regarded as a hero of the Romanian Army
- Kenan Kutub-zade – Red Army cameraman who filmed scenes in Auschwitz used in the Nuremberg trials
- Refat Mustafaev – battalion commissar and partisan leader
- Mansur Mazinov – first Crimean Tatar pilot
- Abdraim Reshidov – decorated Pe-2 pilot and Hero of the Soviet Union; told KGB that he would commit self-immolation during a public holiday if he was forced to remain in exile.
- Seytnafe Seytveliyev – sergeant in the Red Army; Hero of the Soviet Union
- Dzhafer Osman Topchi – infantry officer, twice nominated for the title Hero of the Soviet Union
- Asan Khaliev – Red Army sniper with over 240 kills

== Politicians ==
- Kázím Abdulakim – former Deputy Mayor of Constanța and a Member of the Romanian Parliament
- Ruslan Balbek – Member of the Russian Duma
- Lilya Budzhurova - deputy of the Verkhovna Rada of Crimea
- Noman Çelebicihan – first President of the Crimean People's Republic
- Refat Çubarov – Chairman of the Mejlis
- Cemil Çiçek – Speaker of the Parliament of Turkey
- Dimitrie Cantemir, from Cantemir dynasty – voivode of Moldova
- Emine Dzhaparova – was the First Deputy Minister of Foreign Affairs of Ukraine
- Nariman Dzhelyal – Ukraine ambassador to Turkey
- Fahrettin Kerim Gökay – governor of Istanbul
- Ahmed İhsan Kırımlı – president of the Crimean Tatar Society of Turkey
- Vasily Kochubey – was a Russian Imperial state figure and member of Kochubey family
- Adnan Menderes – first democratically elected Prime Minister of Turkey
- Nazim Osmanov – leader of Mubarek
- Ahmet Tevfik Pasha – last Grand Vizier of the Ottoman Empire
- Hasan Polatkan – Minister of Labor and Finance of Turkey
- Fyodor Rostopchin - was a Russian statesman
- Zeki Sezer – politician and former chairman of the Democratic Left Party (DSP)
- Sevil Shhaideh – Deputy Prime Minister of Romania
- Hafsa Sultan – first valide sultan of the Ottoman Empire as mother of Suleiman the Magnificent
- Seit Tairov – secretary of the Jizzakh regional committee in the Uzbek SSR
- Ersin Tatar - President of Northern Cyprus
- Rustem Umierov – Defence minister of Ukraine

== Writers and intellectuals ==
- Ayshe Seitmuratova – dissident
- Ahatanhel Krymsky – scientist
- Shamil Aladin – newspaper editor, poet, and novelist
- Şevqiy Bektöre – textbook writer, linguist, and gulag detainee
- Usein Bodaninsky – historian, museum director, and ethnographer
- Muazzez İlmiye Çığ – archaeologist, sumerologist, assyriologist, writer
- Bekir Çoban-zade – poet and professor; victim of the Great Purge
- Cengiz Dağcı – novelist and poet
- Emel Emin – poet, translator, Turkologist, and educator
- Seitumer Emin – writer and poet
- Tahsin Gemil – historian
- Necip Hablemitoğlu – writer and historian; assassinated
- Halil İnalcık – historian
- Murat Bardakçı – journalist
- Ismail Gaspirali – founder of the Jadid movement
- Abdulla Latif-zade – literary critic, poet, and writer
- Aziz Nesin – humorist and writer of over 100 books
- Mehmet Niyazi – poet, journalist, academic and activist
- İlber Ortaylı – historian
- Septar Mehmet Yakub – lawyer, thinker, Mufti of Romania
- Çetin Altan – writer, politician

== Civil rights activists ==
- Reşat Amet – murdered activist
- Mustafa Dzhemilev – leader of the Mejlis
- Emir-Usein Kuku – human rights defender
- Musa Mamut – committed self-immolation in protest of being forced to leave Crimea
- Server Mustafayev – human rights defender
- Yuri Osmanov – one of the founders of the National Movement of Crimean Tatars; assassinated
- Ayşe Seitmuratova – activist for right of return of Crimean Tatars who were deported as young children

== Entrepreneurs ==
- Feyzi Akkaya – one of the founders of STFA Construction Group
- Yıldırım Demirören – businessman, president of the Turkish Football Federation
- Sabri Ülker - Turkish industrialist and businessman, and the founder of Ülker.

== Athletes ==
- Djamolidine Abdoujaparov – Cyclist, three-time winner of Green Jersey in the Tour de France
- Aider Abduraimov - boxer
- Rizvan Ablitarov - football player
- Aider Abduraimov – boxer
- Enver Ablaev – skier
- Denis Alibec – Romanian footballer
- Server Djeparov – professional soccer player
- Edris Fetisleam - tennis player
- Deniz Giafer - football player
- Ersan İlyasova – professional basketball player
- Rustam Khudzhamov - former football player
- İlhan Mansız – former professional soccer player
- Redvan Memeshev - football player
- Ervin Memetov - football player
- Eskender Mustafaiev - swimmer
- Aihan Omer – former handball player and coach
- Atila Septar - rugby player
- Erdinci Septar - rugby player
- Talyat Sheikhametov - former football player
- Lenur Temirov - wrestler

== Artists, musicians, and popular culture personalities ==
- Serdar Ortaç - singer
- Zarema - singer, songwriter, actress. Signed and released an album with Sony Music in 2007. Co-wrote the song "Night Of My Life" with legendary multi Grammy winning producer RedOne. Member of SAG-AFTRA.
- Melek Amet – first Crimean Tatar fashion model in Romania
- Cüneyt Arkın – film actor, producer and director
- Gürer Aykal – conductor and adjunct professor at Bilkent University; the musical director and principal conductor of the Borusan Istanbul Philharmonic Orchestra
- Erol Büyükburç – singer-songwriter, pop music composer
- Ayşe Dittanova – actress
- Adaviye Efendieva – master weaver and embroiderer
- Esin Engin musician, composer, arranger and film actor
- Erol Evgin – pop singer and composer
- Enver İzmaylov – folk and jazz musician
- Zamir Gotta – Russian television personality and producer.
- Jamala – winner of 2016 Eurovision Song Contest representing Ukraine
- Evelina Mambetova – international supermodel
- Aybüke Pusat – actress and model
- Aydan Şener – 1981 Miss Turkey
- Akhtem Seitablayev – film director (Haytarma, Cyborgs (film)), screenwriter and actor
- Nariman Aliev – film director and screenwriter (Homeward (film)).
- Nilüfer Yumlu – pop singer and Eurovision contestant
- Selda Bağcan – musician
- Orhan Gencebay – musician and actor

== Scientists, engineers, and mathematicians ==
- Ali Aliev – nanoscientist
- Refat Appazov – OKB-1 engineer
- Lenur Arifov – nuclear physicist
- Asan Asan-Nuri – petroleum engineer
- Girey Bairov – surgeon
- Kerim Bekirbaev – aircraft designer
- Mustafa Emirbayer – professor of sociology at University of Wisconsin-Madison
- Midat Selimov – infectious disease specialist
- Rollan Kadyev – physicist

== See also ==
- List of Tatars
- List of Crimean khans
