= Rollan Kadyev =

Crimean Tatar physicist and civil rights activist (1937–1990)

Rollan Qadiyev
- Born: 9 April 1937; Azek, Bakhchysarai Raion, Crimean ASSR, USSR
- Died: 15 May 1990 (aged 53); Samarkand, Uzbek SSR, USSR
- Burial place: Panjob Mazori cemetery
- Education: Samarkand State University
- Occupations: physicist, docent
- Spouse: Jamiliya Khalikova

Rollan Kemalevich Kadyev (Crimean Tatar: Rollan Kemal oğlu Qadıyev, Russian: Роллан Кемалевич Кадыев; 9 April 1937 – 15 May 1990) was a Crimean Tatar physicist and civil rights activist in the Soviet Union. A defendant in the Tashkent process, he became known as a firebrand opponent of marginalization and delimination Crimean Tatars, publicly denouncing the restrictions on returning to Crimea as well as the government policy of claiming Crimean Tatars were not a distinct ethnic group that was exemplified by official use of the euphemism "people of Tatar nationality who formerly lived in the Crimea" instead of their proper ethnonym of "Crimean Tatar". For his activities such as distributing leaflets and verbally confronting those who endorsed the status quo against of national policy relating the Crimean Tatars, he was imprisoned on charges of "defaming the Soviet system", despite passionately making the case that discriminatory and assimilationist policies against Crimean Tatars was a huge deviation from proper Leninist national policy. Later on in his life he significantly softened his tone after a 1979 imprisonment for getting into a fight with a party organizer, controversially signing off an open letter critical of Ayshe Seitmuratova's activities with Radio Liberty, which was published in Lenin Bayrağı and Pravda Vostoka in February 1981.

== Early life ==
Kadyev was born on 9 April 1937 to a Crimean Tatar family in Crimea. His family strongly supported the Soviet Union; his mother Selime was a Komsomol activist since the early days of the union, and his parents named him Rollan in honor of Romain Rolland, a French writer and outspoken supporter of Stalin. The family tried to flee from advancing German troops during the invasion of Crimea, but were enable to evacuate the peninsula in time, forcing them to live quietly and hope to remain unnoticed until the Red Army returned. Despite their loyalty to the Soviet government, they were still subject to exile, and when he was a young child he was violently awakened early one May morning when a soldier who pointed a bayonet in his face; his family, like other Crimean Tatars, were subsequently given very little time to get dressed and pack a few belongings they could carry before being deported to Central Asia. The family arrived in Samarkand, where they lived in exile for decades.

== Physics career ==
Despite the hardships he endured growing up, Kadyev excelled academically in secondary school and managed to get accepted into the Physics Faculty of Samarkand State University after some setbacks. After graduating with honors in 1959 he worked at the Department of Theoretical Physics, where he focused on the study of astrophysics, gravity, and the theory of relativity; he studies were published in the Journal of Experimental and Theoretical Physics. After being rejected for chances to travel for science conferences in the country, he was eventually he was allowed to attend the Fifth International Conference on General Theory of Relativity, which took place in Tbilisi in Summer 1968. There he presented a report titled "New experimental confirmation of the general theory of relativity" with his colleague Lenur Arifov. At the conference he was asked about his Crimean Tatar background by a foreign journalist; Kadyev then spoke about the plight of Crimean Tatars instead of pretending to be "rooted" in the Uzbek SSR, which got him in further trouble with the KGB. By that time, he had already become known to authorities for his support of right of return and had been summoned by administrators and party officials on various occasions. Upon arrival in Samarkand after the conference his house was searched, and he was officially arrested in October 1968. After being tried with the other "Tashkent Ten" and subsequently serving three years in prison on charges of "defaming the Soviet system" he returned to teaching at Samarkand University, but after a second imprisonment and subsequent parole in 1981 for getting into a fight with a party organizer for rude remarks in 1979 he was initially banned from teaching, so he worked as a laboratory assistant at the university instead. Despite the setback, he went on to defend his thesis and attain a candidate of sciences degree, and eventually became an associate professor.

== Crimean Tatar rights activism ==
Kadyev's parents, as steadfast communists, were among the first people to join initiative groups campaigning for Crimean Tatar rights. Following their example, Kadyev also kept the dream of returning to Crimea, and soon became active in the movement as well. He was first reprimanded by party organs in December 1966 for his refusal to tow the party line; he was asked to give a lecture to a group of students about the Soviet constitution that adhered to the party line, but he felt he could not do so in good faith because he felt the constitution did not protect his rights due to the way Crimean Tatars were treated, having no right of return to Crimea and the Crimean ASSR being officially dissolved, so he asked that he not have to give the lecture. The dean subsequently convened the party bureau to reprimand him and tell him that Crimean Tatars had nothing to complain about, but Kadyev stood by his position and asked why Crimean Tatars weren't rehabilitated and allowed to return but other deported peoples were.

On 9 September 1967 when party leader Vishnevsky came to the university to read out an announcement about the 5 September 1967 government decree declaring that "people of Tatar nationality who formerly lived in Crimea" were officially "rehabilitated" before ranting against Crimean Tatars, Kadyev and his friend Veli Ismailov rebuked him in front of the audience. For doing so they summoned by the school administration and forced to attend four hours of ideological education.

In May 1968 Kadyev joined a group of an estimated 800 Crimean Tatars in an organized delegation to Moscow to hold a rally to mourn the anniversary of the deportation on 18 May and speak with political leaders. However, word about plans to hold the rally reached authorities before it happened, leading to Moscow authorities violently suppressing the activities of and detaining the Crimean Tatar visitors to Moscow before expelling them from the city on 17 May; Kadyev concluded that the KGB had been wiretapping their phones and recording their conversations because of their advance knowledge of the planned rally; he also visited Bakhchysarai, but was not able to stay for very long. Later that year at the conference in Tbilisi he gave an honest and bleak assessment of the situation Crimean Tatars faced to a foreign journalist who asked him about it, which the KGB immediately found out about. Having been on their radar for a while, they prepared to prosecute him for his activism for Crimean Tatar rights, ransacking his residence in Samarkand before eventually arresting him in early October 1968. In addition, the authorities searched his parents' and father-in-law's residences, despite him not living there at the time he was arrested. While awaiting his trial, which did not begin until 1 July 1969, he wrote letters to judicial authorities condemning the prosecution. On 12 November 1968 he wrote a letter to the prosecutor of the Uzbek SSR tearing apart arguments made by authorities against him and demanding various documents for his defense, including the Universal Declaration of Human Rights, the Constitution of the USSR, all volumes of CPSU resolutions and decrees, and the complete works of Lenin followed by threat of hunger strike.

=== 1969 trial ===
At his trial he took the stand to issue lengthy statement (over two hours long) in his defense against the prosecution's claims point by point. While he never denied having written the content of various leaflets and letters, he asserted that everything he wrote was truthful, countering the prosecutions claims that he was producing and distributing documents containing "deliberately false fabrications discrediting the Soviet state and social system". Later in his speech he sharply criticized Soviet national policy towards Crimean Tatars as assimilationist to further defend his right to use the word genocide to describe how they were treated; to further emphasize Soviet hypocrisy on the issue of national policy, he brought an article from issue No27 of the 1969 circulation of Novoe vremya, a Russian-language Soviet magazine, and read it aloud followed by his own commentary. The article, produced in the era of the Sino-Soviet split, condemned Chinese national policy in Xinjiang as "reactionary" and claimed that Maoists were trying to dissolve national minorities into the Han nation via forced assimilation. Kadyev then compared the alleged treatment of Uyghurs described in the article to that of Crimean Tatars, noting that the Soviet government treated Crimean Tatars worse than what it alleged China was doing to Uyghurs — with Crimean Tatars being exiled, their national republic dissolved, and not even recognized as a distinct ethnic group — while in contrast, Uyghurs were still allowed to live in Xinjiang and held status as titular people of the Xinjiang Uyghur Autonomous Region, yet the Soviet government was strongly condemning China's alleged treatment of Uyghurs while enforcing an even more harsh policy against Crimean Tatars than what alleged against China. He also compared the December 1966 statement Soviet government official Aleksey Kosygin claiming that absolutely all ethnic groups in the country were equal (even though the 1967 decree claiming to rehabilitate "people of Tatar nationality who formerly lived in Crimea" had not been made at the time) and expressed rage at the blatant lie, and contrasted it with a statement by Nixon (who Kadyev did not hesitate to describe as "an American Imperialist") tacitly acknowledging the plight of Native Americans, followed by the demand that the government at least recognize the bitter truth by acknowledging that Crimean Tatars were wronged instead of making outright lies and denying the reality about the position of Crimean Tatars in the Soviet Union; in the prosecution's filings, the indictments mocked the idea that Crimean Tatars were exile and referred to them as "allegations", put the word "exile" in quotations to delegitimize the defendants desires to return to Crimea, and frequently went out of their way to avoid acknowledging Crimean Tatars to be a distinct ethnic group via substituting the proper ethnonym "Crimean Tatar" with various degrading euphemisms.

Kadyev further attacked the national policy against Crimean Tatars as being fundamentally anti-Leninist, citing a 1927 Crimean magazine article that described ideal Leninist national policy in Crimea as one that empowers Crimean Tatars in Crimea to build communism, completely contrary to the Stalinist policy of a Crimea without Crimean Tatars. He later went on to point out how groundless the accusations against other defendants in the trial, describing as "lawless" the fact that part of the criminal case against Izzet Khairov and Nurfet Murakhas was a so-called "libelous" note in they left in the guest book at the Crimean Regional Museum of Local Lore during their trip to Crimea in which they requested that various Crimean Tatar war heroes and partisans including Bekir Osmanov be mentioned in museum, along with a note that Heroes of the Soviet Union Teyfuq Abdul, Uzeir Abduramanov, Abduraim Reshidov, and Seytnafe Seytveliyev (who were all Crimean Tatar) should have their portraits included in the museum's photo gallery of Crimeans awarded the title. Before eventually ending is speech with the cry "Crimea is the homeland of the Crimean Tatars", towards the end of his speech he issued the powerful lines that he became famous for:

The Motherland rejected us in 1944, throwing us into exile from our native land. The Motherland rejected in 1945, eliminating the national statehood of our people [by dissolving the Crimean ASSR]. The Motherland rejected us in 1956, taking away the name of Crimean Tatar from us and recognizing us as "rooted" in the places of exile. The Motherland rejected us today too, having put us in the dock only because we could not come to terms with the situation of our outcast

Despite his strong and passionate defense refuting the prosecution's claims, he and all the other defendants were found guilty, and he was sentenced to three years in prison on 5 August 1969. His prophetic warnings that fundamentally un-Leninist national policy in blatant violation of the constitution was detrimental to preserving the union went unheeded.

=== After release ===
After spending three years in a penal colony he returned his activities with the Crimean Tatar civil rights movement, co-authoring the Cessation Statement addressed to the Central Committee of the CPSU demanding the complete abolition of all decrees and resolutions targeting and discriminating against Crimean Tatars. In April 1977 he wrote a letter to Brezhnev criticizing the current version of the Soviet constitution and the document's contradictory stance on the national issue (since it proclaimed to be supportive of minorities yet officially solidified Crimea's status as a mere oblast of the Ukrainian SSR, impeding restoration of the Crimean ASSR sought by Crimean Tatars).

=== Second imprisonment and change in tone ===
In September 1979 he was called to a faculty meeting at the university in which he was publicly berated and reprimanded before being given a "last warning" to fall in line and stop supporting the Crimean Tatar movement, and on 22 September that year one of the largest newspapers in the region, Pravda Vostoka, published a lengthy article shaming him for the same reason. Later that year, Kadyev was arrested on charges of "malicious hooliganism" for which he was sentenced to three years in strict regime camps in January 1980; the incident that led to the charges took place on 28 November when a party organizer publicly demeaned him in front of students, making Kadyev lose his temper and hit him. In February 1981, while he was imprisoned in the Komi ASSR, an open letter appealing to Ayshe Seitmuratova, sharply criticizing her activities with Radio Liberty in the United States, was published in the newspapers Lenin Bayrağı and Pravda Vostoka appearing to be written and signed by him; later in 1982 several other Crimean Tatars received typewritten letters appearing to be from him saying he wrote the letter entirely voluntarily without pressure from authorities. Speculation remains as to the extent to which Kadyev agreed with the message of the letters, or even wrote them: Mustafa Dzhemilev has suggested that Kadyev did not write the letter at all but was merely forced to sign its contents while in prison, and historian Edward Allworth indicated Kadyev was probably blackmailed by the KGB into signing them; Yuri Osmanov and Mikhail Guboglo indicate that the system eventually broke Kadyev and convinced him to give up in order to get paroled early; Gulnara Bekirova implied that the KGB had gotten Kadyev to turn on the movement altogether, while Ruslan Eminov insists that Kadyev changed his tone in the 1980s for reasons of political pragmatism and still firmly desired right of return, and did so simply because he thought a different approach would have greater chances of success. Nevertheless, it is universally agreed that he was at the forefront of the Crimean Tatar movement in its early years, and always feared death of the nation via assimilation. Eventually, he was one of the delegates to the 1987 meeting in Moscow with high-ranking leaders in the government, where he expressed his concerns, which were in agreement with some of the more moderate members of the delegation but were the subject of harsh disagreement with others such as Dzhemilev.

== Personal life ==
He died on 15 May 1990 in a Samarkand hospital during surgery for a malignant brain tumor and was buried in the Panjob Mazori cemetery of Samarkand. He was married and had three children. In his spare time he wrote poetry in Russian and Crimean Tatar.
