= Krasnokamianka =

Krasnokamianka may refer to:

- Krasnokamianka (urban-type settlement)
- Krasnokamianka (village)

== See also ==
- Krasnokamenka (disambiguation)
