= Krasnokamenka =

Krasnokamenka (Russian: Краснока́менка) may refer to:

- Krasnokamenka, Russia, several inhabited localities in Russia
- Krasnokamianka (urban-type settlement) (Krasnokamenka), an urban-type settlement in Crimea
- Krasnokamianka (village) (Krasnokamenka), a village in Crimea

== See also ==
- Kamenka (disambiguation)
