= Krasnokamenka, Russia =

Krasnokamenka (Russian: Краснока́менка) may refer to:

- Krasnokamenka, Chelyabinsk Oblast, a village in Chelyabinsk Oblast, Russia
- Krasnokamenka (urban-type settlement), an urban-type settlement in Yalta, Crimea, Ukraine/Russia
- Krasnokamenka (village), a village in Feodosia, Crimea, Ukraine/Russia
