= Zarema (name) =

Zarema is a given name. Notable people with the surname include:

- Zarema, Crimean-American singer, songwriter, and actress
- Zarema Kasayeva (born 1987), Russian weightlifter
- Zarema Muzhakhoyeva (born 1980), Ingush woman
- Zarema Sadulayeva (1974–2009), Russian children's activist
