= Khaybulaev =

Khaybulaev is a surname. Notable people with the surname include:

- Idris Khaybulaev (1915–1984), Crimean Tatar officer
- Movlid Khaybulaev (born 1990), Russian mixed martial artist
- Tagir Khaybulaev (born 1984), Russian judoka
