= Zoological Museum of Samarkand State University =

Museum in Uzbekistan

- Uzbek: Alisher Navoiy nomidagi Samarqand davlat universiteti zoologiya muzeyi
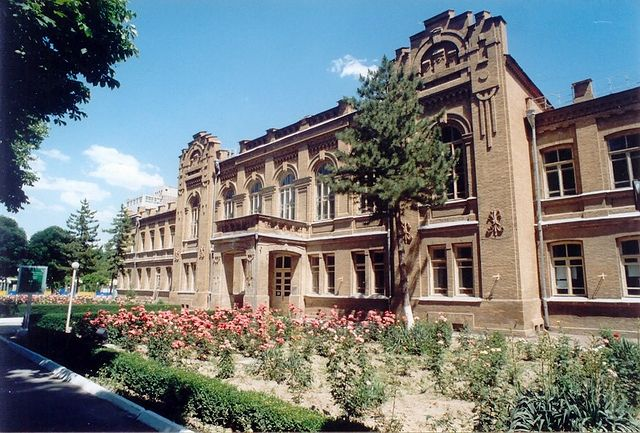
- Zoological Museum and the Faculty of Biology of the Samarkand State University
- Established: 1934
- Location: Samarkand, Uzbekistan
- Coordinates: 39°38′56″N 66°57′53″E
- Founders: Sergey Konstantinovich Dal and Povarov

Zoological Museum of Samarkand State University named after Alisher Navoi is one of the largest history museums in Uzbekistan. It is a part of Samarkand State University named after Alisher Navoi, located in Samarkand. The scientific collections of the museum currently have more than 5,000 exhibits. Several thousand people visit the museum every year. It is part of the Faculty of Natural Sciences and the museum is located in the Department of Zoology.

== History ==
The Samarkand Zoological Museum was founded in 1934 by the famous Soviet zoologist and local historian Sergey Konstantinovich Dal and his brother Povarov.

== Description ==
The total area of the museum is 270 square meters, of which 140 m^{2} is allocated for exposition and 120 m^{2} for holdings. The exhibition hall of the museum also occupies the conference hall of the faculty of natural sciences. Birds, reptiles, fish and insects included in the "Red Book" of Uzbekistan and other countries are displayed in the museum. Among the exhibits there are species of fauna that have completely disappeared.

The museum exhibits the skeleton of a female elephant that once lived in one of the Soviet zoos. During World War II, the zoo and the city ended up in German-occupied territory. The Germans soon took the elephant to the Berlin Zoo, but after the war it was returned to the USSR at the request of the Soviet government. In 1975, an elephant died (probably of old age) during the relocation of the animals, and its body was dumped on the steppe. After learning that the elephant's body was simply abandoned, the museum staff found it and took it to the museum after processing the bones. It soon became clear that no one knew how to assemble the skeleton. In this regard, a special delegation went to Leningrad to clarify the location of the bones and number them according to the collection scheme. Since then, the skeleton has been kept in this museum.
