= Nuri Celilov =

Soviet Crimean Tatar tank commander

- Born: 15 September 1913; Qiziltash, Yalta region, Taurida Governorate, Russian Empire
- Died: 14 December 1976 (aged 63); Krymsky District, Krasnodar Krai, RSFSR, USSR
- Military career
- Allegiance: Soviet Union
- Branch: Red Army
- Service years: 1941–1946
- Rank: Major
- Unit: 90th Guards Heavy Tank Regiment
- Conflicts: World War II
- Awards: Order of the Red Banner (3)

Nuri Celilov (Russian: Нури Джелилов, romanized: Nuri Dzhelilov; 15 September 1913 – 14 December 1976) was an officer and tank company commander in the Red Army during World War II who was nominated for the title Hero of the Soviet Union for his bravery in combat.

== Early life ==
Celilov was born on 15 September 1913 to a working-class Crimean Tatar family in the village of Qiziltash near Yalta. An agronomist and graduate of Yalta Agricultural College, became trained as a winemaker before being drafted into the Red Army in 1941.

== World War II ==
Drafted into the Red Army immediately after the German invasion of the Soviet Union, he initially attended specialization training before being deployed as a political instructor in the 1st squadron of the 138th Cavalry Regiment. There, he fought in the initial phase of the war, and killing his first enemy soldier on the bank of the Dniepr. Having been a made commander of the 4th Barrage Squadron within the same division (the 30th Cavalry Division) in June 1942, he survived the retreats to become a student of the Ulyanovsk Heavy Tank School; after graduating from the school he was appointed as commander of the 4th company in the 90th Guards Tank Regiment in December 1944. Remaining with that unit for the rest of the war, he fought in many major offensive battles for cities in Eastern Europe including Warsaw, Łódź, Poznań, Szczecin, Kostrzyn, and Berlin, distinguishing himself on multiple occasions including during the crossing of a heavily defended area of the Oder riverbank and eventually the Battle of Berlin. Leading by example, he developed and implemented new tactics for tank combat, and refused to give up when his damaged tank completely surrounded by Panzerfaust, surprising them by jumping out of the tank and opening fire with an automatic rifle and tossing grenades; having won that engagement, he went on to lead his company in the battle for Berlin and become the first member of his regiment to reach the Reichstag. From mid April to early May, his company took out 11 enemy tanks, 24 vehicles, 26 firing points, and other enemy equipment in addition to killing over 100 enemy soldiers and clearing 24 blocks of Berlin for infantry; Celilov's personal tally included seven enemy tank kills. For his leadership in the battles for Poland and Germany he was nominated for the title Hero of the Soviet Union, but was only awarded the Order of the Red Banner.

== Post-war ==
Until December 1946 he remained in Germany as part of the contingent of Soviet troops, reaching the rank of major and becoming a division commander. Forbidden from returning to Crimea, he initially lived in the Uzbek SSR, where he found parents had been deported to. His brother, Cevded Celilov, also survived the war and became a decorated combat pilot. He married and had several children, and dreamt of returning to Crimea, but was unable to return, despite his many attempts to move closer to the peninsula, first to Dagestan and later to Krasnodar. In his later years he suffered from cancer, and eventually died of a heart attack on 14 December 1976. Despite his wishes to be buried in Yalta, he was buried in Krasnodar.

== See also ==
- Idris Khaybulaev
- Dzhevdet Dermendzhi
