= Ahmed İhsan Kırımlı =

Turkish politician

Personal details
- Born: 23 April 1920 Balikesir
- Died: 11 December 2011 (aged 91) Ankara
- Party: Democratic Party, Justice Party, Nationalist Democracy Party (Turkey)
- Spouse: Zuhal Çiçek Kırımlı
- Education: Istanbul University

Ahmed İhsan Kırımlı (23 April 1920 – 11 December 2011) was a Turkish doctor, politician, poet and philanthropist, a member of the Cabinet of Turkey, a four-time member of the Grand National Assembly of Turkey and the president of the Crimean Tatar Society of Turkey from 1987 until his death in 2011.

== Personal life ==
Ahmed İhsan Kırımlı was born to a family of Crimean Tatar immigrants in Turkey. His great-grandfather was the mufti of Bakhchysarai. He graduated from İstanbul Medical School in 1947. He is married to Dr. Zuhal Çiçek Kırımlı, the couple have two children: Dr. Hakan Kırımlı and Cihan Kırımlı. Also as poet and a writer, he has written several academic articles on medical tourism, thermal tourism, child healthcare and family planning, in addition to his book on that same field.

== Political life ==
Ahmed İhsan Kırımlı was the vice-chairman of the Justice Party (Turkey) for six years and he was on the board from 1962 to 1976. He was a member of the Grand National Assembly of Turkey from 1961 to 1977. He served as the Minister of Tourism for Turkey. Following the coup d'état of 12 September 1980 led by Kenan Evren, he became one of the cofounders of the Nationalist Democracy Party. He has also served as the member of the Commission of National Security and Foreign Affairs, head of the National Health Commission and the deputy-chair of the Turkish Red Crescent.

== Philanthropy ==
After finding out about the Deportation of the Crimean Tatars, he has given several lectures and made public speeches in both England and United States He has also led numerous discussions in World League for Freedom and Democracy conferences during the 1960s and 1970s. Upon retiring from political arena in 1987, Ahmed İhsan Kırımlı devoted his entire life to charity. He has served as the president of the Crimean Tatar Society of Turkey for more than 20 years.

== See also ==
- Crimea
- Crimean Tatars
- List of Crimean Tatars
- Islam in Ukraine
