= Cengiz Dağcı =

Crimean Tatar novelist and poet

- Born: 9 March 1919; Gurzuf, Crimea
- Died: 22 September 2011 (aged 92); London, United Kingdom
- Occupations: Novelist, poet
- Writing career
- Period: 1956–2011

Cengiz Dağcı (9 March 1919 – 22 September 2011) was a Crimean Tatar novelist and poet. He wrote his works in Turkish, despite having never been in Turkey. He wrote about twenty novels on his life and his motherland — Crimea.

He was born in Gurzuf, Crimea, but grew up in Qızıltaş village (now Krasnokamianka). His first two poems were published in the Crimean newspaper in 1936. He entered Simferopol Pedagogical Institute in 1937. However, he did not graduate from it because of mobilizing to the Red Army in 1940. He was taken hostage by the Nazis in 1941 and survived Nazi labour camps. In 1946, Dağcı and Regina, his wife, settled in London, where he would live until his death. He began to write novels in Turkish in 1958. His novel "Letters to my mother" was named "the best novel" by the Turkish Writers' Union in 1988. The Turkish Society of Scientists and Writers awarded him for outstanding contributions to Turkic literature in 1993. Cengiz Dağcı died on 22 September 2011 at his home. In accordance of his last will, he was buried in Qızıltaş, Crimea. The funeral service in Simferopol was attended by a large delegation of Turkish officials, as well as by the Foreign Minister of Turkey, Ahmet Davutoğlu.
