= Lenur Arifov =

Crimean Tatar physicist (1938–2013)

- Born: 10 December 1938; Yalta, Crimean ASSR, RSFSR, USSR
- Died: 11 March 2018 (aged 79); Simferopol, Crimea
- Education: Samarkand State University; Institute of Nuclear Physics of the Academy of Sciences of the Uzbek SSR
- Occupation: physicist
- Awards: Honored Worker of Education of the Autonomous Republic of Crimea

Lenur Yagya Arifov (Russian: Ленур Ягъя Арифов; 10 December 1938 – 11 March 2018) was a physicist who conducted research on general relativity, gravity, cosmology, relativistic astrophysics and nuclear physics. Exiled from Crimea in 1944 as a young child because of his Crimean Tatar ethnicity, he grew up in the Uzbek SSR, and eventually made it to Samarkand State University, where he became friends and colleagues with fellow Crimean Tatar physicist and civil rights activist Rollan Qadiyev, who he went on to co-author several scientific works with. Eventually he became a professor and received his doctorate. After returning to Crimea in 1992 he worked at the Department of Theoretical Physics in Simferopol State University.
