= Mansur Mazinov =

Soviet Crimean Tatar pilot and flight instructor (1906–1983)

- Native name: Мансур Мустафаевич Мазинов
- Born: 25 September 1906; Gurzuf, Taurida Governorate, Russian Empire
- Died: 11 March 1983 (aged 76) Kazakh SSR, Soviet Union
- Allegiance: Soviet Union
- Branch: Soviet Air Force
- Rank: Major
- Conflicts: World War II
- Awards: Order of the Red Banner

Mansur Mustafaevich Mazinov (Russian: Мансу́р Мустафа́евич Мазинов; 25 September 1906 – 11 March 1983) was a Soviet flight instructor, air force officer, World War II veteran, and the first Crimean Tatar pilot.

== Early life ==
Mazinov was born in Guzruf, Yalta region, Crimea, Russian Empire. He began his aviation career in Simferopol, where he entered flight school in 1930 with the first group of cadets at the new school of pilots named after the Central Executive Committee of the Crimean ASSR. After graduating in 1932 he became a flight instructor with the OSOVIAHIM and trained new cadets at the aeroclub until transferring for further training in Moscow in 1934. Upon graduating in 1935 he transferred to the Ulyanovsk Flight and Technical School and later served at a military aviation school in Saratov.

== World War II ==
Having been deployed to the frontlines of the Kalinin Front in February 1942 as an officer in the 147th Transport Aviation Regiment, and by June that year he received his first combat award, an Order of the Red Banner. Throughout the war he served as an "air cabbie" delivering important equipment to the frontlines, piloting the R-5, UT-2, and Po-2. His delivery missions included aiding partisans and besieged Leningrad, and at times required making landings in extremely difficult conditions at night with poor weather. At the end of the war he was a deputy squadron commander with the rank of captain in the 142nd Transport Aviation Regiment.

== Exile ==
After the war Mazinov taught at the Starobelsk School of Pilots until 1952; while in the reserve he was promoted to the rank of major. Later he headed an airfield in Pavlodar, Kazakh SSR. He died in exile in 1983 before Crimean Tatars received the full right of return.

== Awards ==
- Two Order of the Red Banner (22 June 1942 and 10 December 1942)
- Order of the Patriotic War 2nd class (18 May 1945)
- campaign and jubilee medals

== See also ==
- Amet-khan Sultan
- Emir Chalbash
- Abdraim Reshidov
