= Idris Khaybulaev =

Crimean tatar officer

- Идрис Булатович Хайбулаев
- Born: 15 March 1915; Sudak, Taurida Governorate, Russian Empire
- Died: 19 October 1984 (aged 69); Arkhipo-Osipovka, Krasnodar Krai, RSFSR, USSR
- Military career
- Allegiance: Soviet Union
- Branch: Red Army
- Service years: 1933–1945
- Rank: Lieutenant colonel
- Conflicts: World War II
- Awards: Order of the Red Banner (3)

Idris Bulatovich Khaybulaev (Russian: Идрис Булатович Хайбулаев; 15 March 1915 – 19 October 1984) was a Crimean Tatar officer in the Red Army who rose from platoon commander to regiment commander during World War II. Despite being nominated for the title Hero of the Soviet Union in 1942, he was only awarded an Order of the Red Banner.

== Early life ==
Khaybulaev was born on 15 March 1915 to a Crimean Tatar family in Crimea. Having grown up in an orphanage since 1921, he enlisted in the military when he was only 17, and after graduating from initial training when he was 19, he went on to attend officer training school in Alma-Ata, Kazak SSR.

== World War II ==
In early December 1941 Khaybulaev was deployed to the warfront of World War II as part of the 39th Separate Rifle Brigade, where he fought in Battle of Moscow, initially commanding a platoon of machine gunners within the 1st Separate Rifle Battalion. During the battle his platoon saw huge victories, taking 217 German soldiers and officers prisoner in addition to their equipment. Despite sustaining wounds to his legs in the battle, he quickly returned to the front and was appointed commander of the 1337th Mountain Rifle Regiment. For the feat in the battle of Moscow he was nominated for the title Hero of the Soviet Union on 16 March 1942, which was supported by both the commissar and his commanding officer, but general Vladimir Kurasov downgraded the nomination to an Order of the Red Banner. He subsequently led his regiment through the battles for various cities in Ukraine including Kiev, Zhitomir, Rovno, Slavuta, Kamianets-Podilskyi, and Chernivtsi in addition to Poland before ending the war in Czechoslovakia, where he was wounded in combat again.

== Postwar ==
After the end of the war he lived in Kuvasay, Uzbek SSR, unable to return to Crimea as a Crimean Tatar. In 1971 he and his family moved to Akhipo-Osipovka in Krasnodar to get closer to his homeland, but he died there in 1984 before receiving right of return to Crimea.

== Awards ==
- Three Order of the Red Banner (22 July 1942, 22 September 1942, 15 June 1945)
- Order of the Patriotic War 1st class (6 February 1945)
- Medal "For Battle Merit" (30 April 1945)
- campaign and jubilee medals

== See also ==
- Nuri Dzhelilov
- Dzhevdet Dermendzhi
