= Melek Amet =

Romanian Crimean Tatar fashion model

- Born: 4 October 1960; Bucharest, Romanian People's Republic
- Died: 22 May 2008 (aged 47); Bucharest, Romania
- Resting place: Ghencea Muslim Cemetery, Bucharest
- Occupation: Modeling
- Known for: First Crimean Tatar fashion model in Romania
- Spouses: Mircea Trofin (m. 1979–1982): Sergiu Mocanu
- Parents: Ğemal Seyidğan (father); Ğewerkan Seyidğan (mother)

Melek Amet (4 October 1960 – 22 May 2008) was a Romanian model. As the first Crimean Tatar fashion model in Romania, she broke down barriers and became the symbol of a cultural shift.

== Biography ==
Melek Amet, which in Crimean Tatar language means Angel, was the daughter of Ğemal Seyidğan (also spelled in Romanian as: Gemal Seidgean) and Ğewerkan (also spelled in Romanian as: Gevercan). Her father Ğemal was from Medgidia and he had been a trader who invested his profit in land becoming a well-known landlord in Constanța, but the communist authorities confiscated his properties and sentenced him to hard labor in the forced labor camps at the Danube–Black Sea Canal. When he was released, he married Ğewerkan, a schoolteacher from Poarta Albă/Alakapî. She was twenty years his junior. They married and, hoping to escape the harassment of the Muslims practiced by authorities in Dobruja, they moved to Bucharest where, on 4 October 1960, Melek, their only child, was born.

Amet had two short marriages. The first, when she was 18, with Mircea Trofin, the son of Virgil Trofin, who was Deputy Prime Minister under Nicolae Ceaușescu. Amet's second marriage was with her schoolmate Sergiu Mocanu, politician, former director of the Democratic Party. Mircea Trofin was the one who approached her to sign for Venus Fashion House in Bucharest where, under the direction of Zina Dumitrescu, her career took off.

In 1989, Amet went on to major Romanian magazines, particularly to Modern magazine. Along with Ilinca Vlad, Eugenia Enciu, Rodica Protasievici, Romanița Iovan, Janine and Cătălin Botezatu, she has been part of the golden modeling generation in Romania. She toured with Stela Popescu, Alexandru Arșinel, and Romica Puceanu. She presented exclusive collections to the Central Committee of the Romanian Communist Party, diplomatic corps and embassies, and she was famous for her high-profile relationships. Many believe that she was Romania's most popular model in the communist era.

After a successful decade run between 1981 and 1992.She worked in international transports, she sold soft drinks, cars, chocolate, and dresses. However, she never retired from modeling, where she founded the Blu Models Agency. She also pursued a career as a TV show host.

In 2006, Amet was diagnosed with ovarian cancer, and she went through surgery. In 2008 the disease recurred, dying on 22 May, 2008. She is buried at Ghencea Muslim Cemetery in Bucharest.

Amet's last wish was to regain possession of her father's wealth and to build an oncology clinic to save lives. Although the court ruled in her favor granting possession of her father's properties, local authorities continue to refuse legal execution.

== See also ==
- Crimean Tatars
- List of Crimean Tatars

== Sources ==
- Pauna, Eveline (30 January 2014). "Melek Amet – Povestea femeii cu nume de înger" (in Romanian). www.revistatango.ro. Revista Tango. Archived from the original on 5 September 2014.
- Iancu, Mariana (23 October 2012). "Drama care naște alte drame: Averea celebrului manechin Melek Amet, confiscată la Constanța pentru a doua oară" (in Romanian). www.ziuaconstanta.ro. Ziua de Constanta.
- Musatoiu, Alina (23 May 2008). "A murit Melek Amet, cel mai cunoscut manechin din timpul comunismului" (in Romanian). life.hotnews.ro. Hot News.
- Ziare.com (22 May 2008). "Melek, manechin vedeta pe vremea lui Ceaușescu, a murit" (in Romanian). www.ziare.com. Ziare.com.
- Alexandru, Dan (22 May 2013). "Au trecut 5 ani de la moartea lui Melek Amet". www.ziarulatac.ro (in Romanian). Atac.
- Dobrogeanu, Nadina (5 March 2013). ""Mama" Zina Dumitrescu, povestea unei doamne" (in Romanian). verticalnews.ro. Vertical News.
- Express Press (6 January 2014). "Știrile de ultimă oră, disponibile online" (in Romanian). expresspress1.rssing.com. Express Press.
- Balan, Claudia (11 March 2014). "Tragedie greu de suportat pentru mama femeii cu nume de inger! Ce se intampla in familia lui Melek Amet, la 5 ani de la moartea ei" (in Romanian). www.cancan.ro. CanCan.
