= Ukaz 493 =

Decree No. 493 "On citizens of Tatar nationality, formerly living in the Crimea" (Russian: Указ № 493 «О гражданах татарской национальности, проживавших в Крыму») was issued by the Presidium of the Supreme Soviet on 5 September 1967 proclaiming that "Citizens of Tatar nationality formerly living in the Crimea" [sic] were officially legally rehabilitated and had "taken root" in places of residence. For many years the government claimed that the decree "settled" the "Tatar problem", despite the fact that it did not restore the rights of Crimean Tatars and formally made clear that they were no longer recognized as a distinct ethnic group.

== History ==
While other deported peoples such as the Chechens, Ingush, Kalmyks, Karachays, and Balkars had long since been permitted to return to their native lands and their republics were restored in addition to other forms of political rehabilitation as recognized peoples, the very same decree of 24 November 1956 “On the restoration of national autonomies of the Kalmyk, Karachay, Chechen and Ingush peoples” («О восстановлении национальных автономий калмыцкого, карачаевского, чеченского и ингушского народов») that rehabilitated those peoples in 1956 took on a genocidal tone towards internally deported Crimean Tatars, offering "national reunification" in the Tatar ASSR belonging to the distinct but similarly named Volga Tatars in lieu of restoration of the Crimean ASSR for Crimean Tatars who sought a national autonomy, despite the fact that Crimean Tatar activists did not seek a "return" to Tatarstan. (Note: The Crimean Tatars are not closely related to the Tatars proper of Tatarstan, who are a Bulgar people with origins in Kazan. Many other ethnic groups not part of the Volga Tatars (who are now just called Tatars) have historically been called Tatar, such as the Azerbaijanis, formerly called Caucasian Tatars. After the deportation of the Crimean Tatars, the Soviet Union did not recognize Crimean Tatars as a distinct ethnic group and frequently suggested Crimean Tatars "return" to Tatarstan despite the fact that Crimean Tatars have no ancestral roots in Tatarstan or common ancestor with the Volga Tatars.) As result, Crimean Tatars organized petitions and delegations to Moscow demand their rehabilitation.

The decree was issued roughly two months after a Crimean Tatar delegation met with senior government officials in Moscow, requesting to be rehabilitated in the same manner as the other deported peoples that had been rehabilitated in 1956. Besides Andropov, Georgadze, Shchelokov, and Rudenko were present at the meeting. On 21 July 1967, Yuri Andropov promised the Crimean Tatars that they would be rehabilitated, however, the decree was not issued until 5 September that year.

Much to the aghast of Crimean Tatar activists, the decree not only failed to allow them to return to Crimea en masse but also revealed that the government did not see them as a distinct ethnic group, only as "people of Tatar nationality formerly living in Crimea" and claimed that they had already "taken root" in Central Asia.

== Implementation and response ==
Unlike what leaders in Moscow had promised, the decree was only published locally in areas where Crimean Tatars lived.

Many Crimean Tatars living in exile who saw the decree mistakenly thought that it meant they were allowed to return to Crimea, and the odd wording of the decree resulted in considerable confusion among Crimean Tatars. As result, many Crimean Tatar families traveled to Crimea in the expectation that they would be allowed to live in Crimea and would be seen as a rehabilitated people. However, most of them were redeported, and very few Crimean Tatars were allowed to return to Crimea in the following years, most under an organized labor recruitment scheme that let in very few Crimean Tatars. For many years, Crimean Tatars continued to be re-deported from Crimea, and it was not until 1989 that they were allowed to return en masse.

Hero of the Soviet Union Abdraim Reshidov was among the first Crimean Tatars who tried to return to Crimea upon seeing the decree, but unlike many others he was able to get a residence permit, albeit only after resorting to threatening self-immolation.

The decree was widely rebuked by people in the Crimean Tatar civil rights movement as being a "fraud", "Another step towards the liquidation of the Crimean Tatar people as a nation" (Очередной шаг в направлении ликвидации крымскотатарского народа как нации), and was ridiculed by the Tashkent Ten defendants as farce.
