= Pravda Vostoka =

Russian language newspaper

- Type: Daily newspaper
- Format: Print, online
- Owner(s): Cabinet of Ministers of the Republic of Uzbekistan
- Founded: 2 April 1917
- Political alignment: Pro-government
- Language: Russian
- Website: https://www.pv.uz/

Pravda Vostoka (Russian: Правда Востока, lit. The Truth of the East) is a Russian language newspaper published in Uzbekistan.

== History and profile ==
The paper was founded in 1917 under the name Nasha gazeta (Russian: Наша газета, Our newspaper). It was given its current name in 1924, and was the main Russian language newspaper of the Uzbek SSR. In 1956, it was awarded the Order of the Red Banner of Labour. It had a print run of 250,000 newspapers in 1975. It was an organ of the Central Committee of the Communist Party of Uzbek SSR and the Supreme Council and the Council of Ministers of the Uzbek SSR.

The editor-in-chief as of 2023 is Salim Doniyorov.
