= Gurzuf =

Gurzuf Гурзуф
- Urban-type settlement
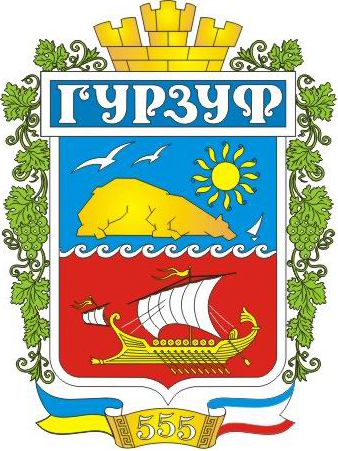
- Flag Coat of arms

- Location of Hurzuf within Crimea Location of Hurzuf within the Black Sea
- Coordinates: 44°33′10″N 34°17′15″E
- Republic: Crimea
- Municipality: Yalta Municipality
- Elevation: 30 m (98 ft)

Population (2014)
  - Total: 8,933
- Time zone: UTC+3 (MSK)
- Postal code: 98640 — 98643
- Area code: +7-654
- Former names: Gorsovium, Gorzubiti
- Climate: Cfa

Gurzuf or Hurzuf (Ukrainian: Гурзуф, Russian: Гурзуф, Crimean Tatar: Gurzuf, Greek: Γορζουβίται) is a resort town (urban-type settlement) in Yalta Municipality of the Autonomous Republic of Crimea, a territory of Ukraine recognized by a majority of countries as part of Ukraine but incorporated by Russia as the Republic of Crimea. Population: 8,933 (2014 Census).

It is located on the northern coast of the Black Sea. It is the site of a 6th-century fortress built by Justinian I and called by Procopius the fortress of the Gorzoubitai. The fortress was later restored by the Genoese who called the place Garzuni, Grasni, and Gorzanium, and appointed it the seat of a chief magistrate. It was a former Crimean Tatar village, now a part of Greater Yalta. Alexander Pushkin visited Gurzuf in 1820 and ballet master Marius Petipa died here. The International Children's Center Artek (formerly the All-Union Young Pioneer camp Artek) is situated just behind Mount Ayu-Dag (Bear Mountain). The World Organization of the Scout Movement's Eurasian Region is headquartered in the town.

Between Gurzuf and Mount Ayu-Dag is Cape Suuksu. At the top of the Cape is a tower, a medieval cemetery, and a small monument to Pushkin.

== Name ==
The origin of the name is not reliably established. Some researchers believe that it comes from the Latin Ursus "bear", as the "Bear Mountain" (Ayu-Dag) is located near the town. Others believe that the name Horzuv, Horzuvaty has Taurian or Gotho-Alan roots and decipher it as "gor dzakkh" - mountain valley, valley among the mountains. Gradually, the place name "Gorzuvyti" was transformed into Kursaity, Gorzovium, Yurzuf, and Gurzuf.

== Demographics ==
As of the 2001 Ukrainian census, Gurzuf had a population of 8,676 inhabitants. It is estimated that ethnic Russians constitute a slim majority, followed by a large, predominantly Russophone Ukrainian population, which accounts for a bit more than one third of the population. Smaller minorities are Crimean Tatars, Belarusians, Poles and Moldovans. Russian, which serves as an interethnic language, is the most spoken tongue in the town, while a significant minority speaks Ukrainian as their primary language. The exact linguistic composition was as follows:

First languages in Hurzuf
	percent
Russian	86.0%
Ukrainian	12.4%
Belarusian	0.4%
Crimean Tatar	0.2%
Moldovan	0.1%
others	0.5%

== People from Gurzuf ==
- Cengiz Dağcı (1919–2011), Crimean Tatar novelist and poet
- Mansur Mazinov (1906–1983), Soviet air force officer, the first Crimean Tatar pilot
- Natalia Popovych (born 1968), Ukrainian politician

== Gallery ==
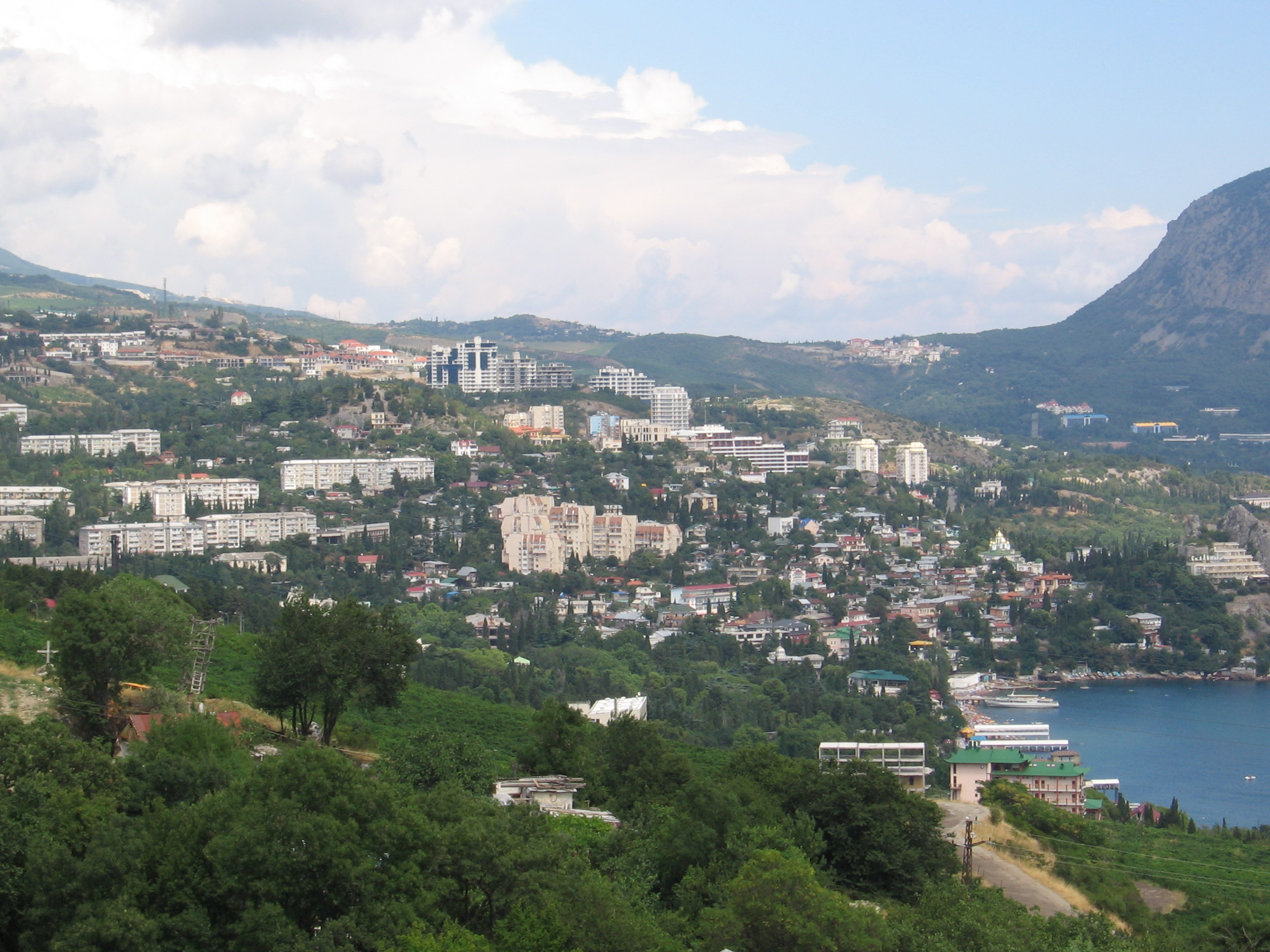
View of Gurzuf

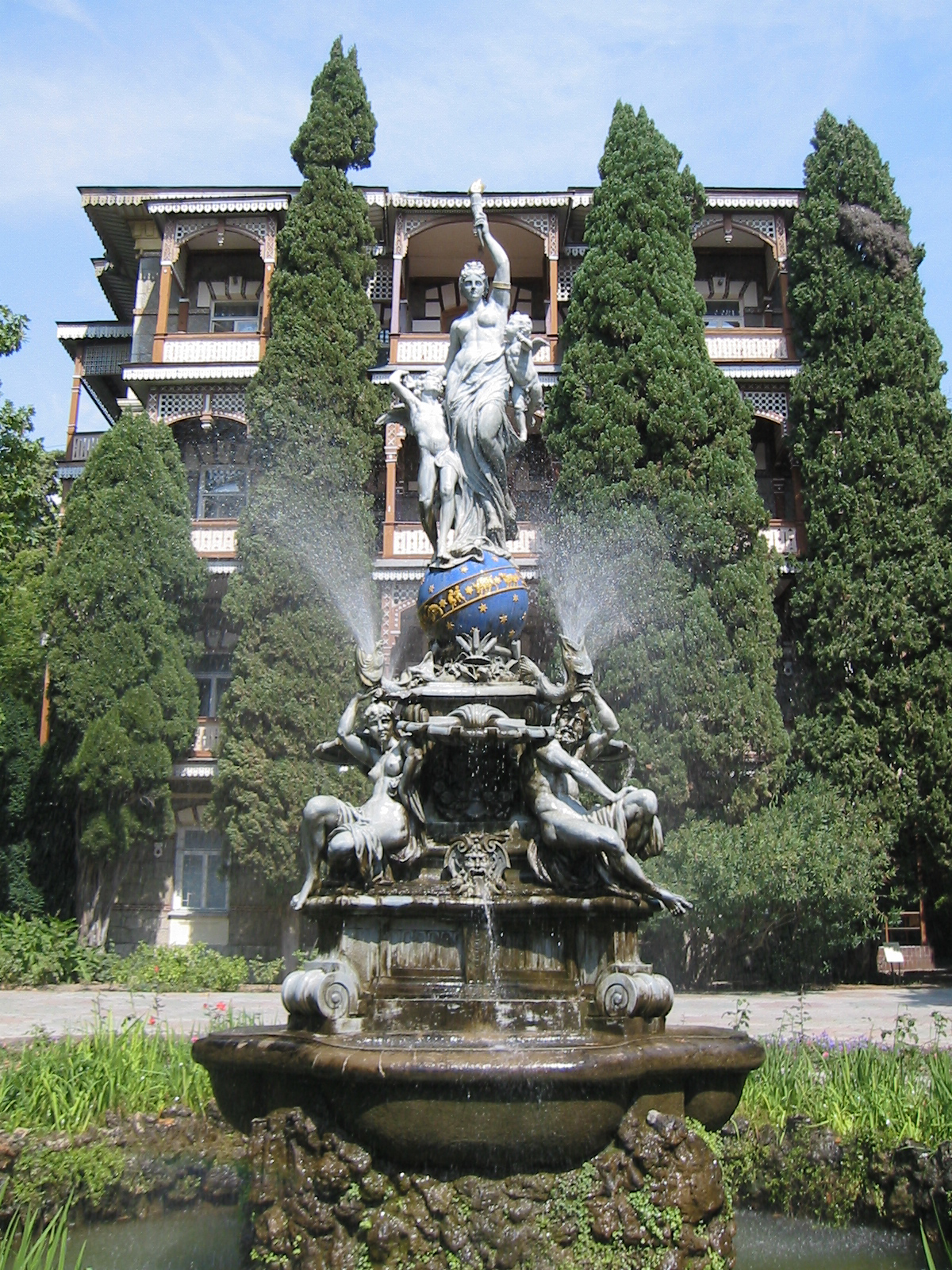
"Goddess of Night" fountain in Gurzuf

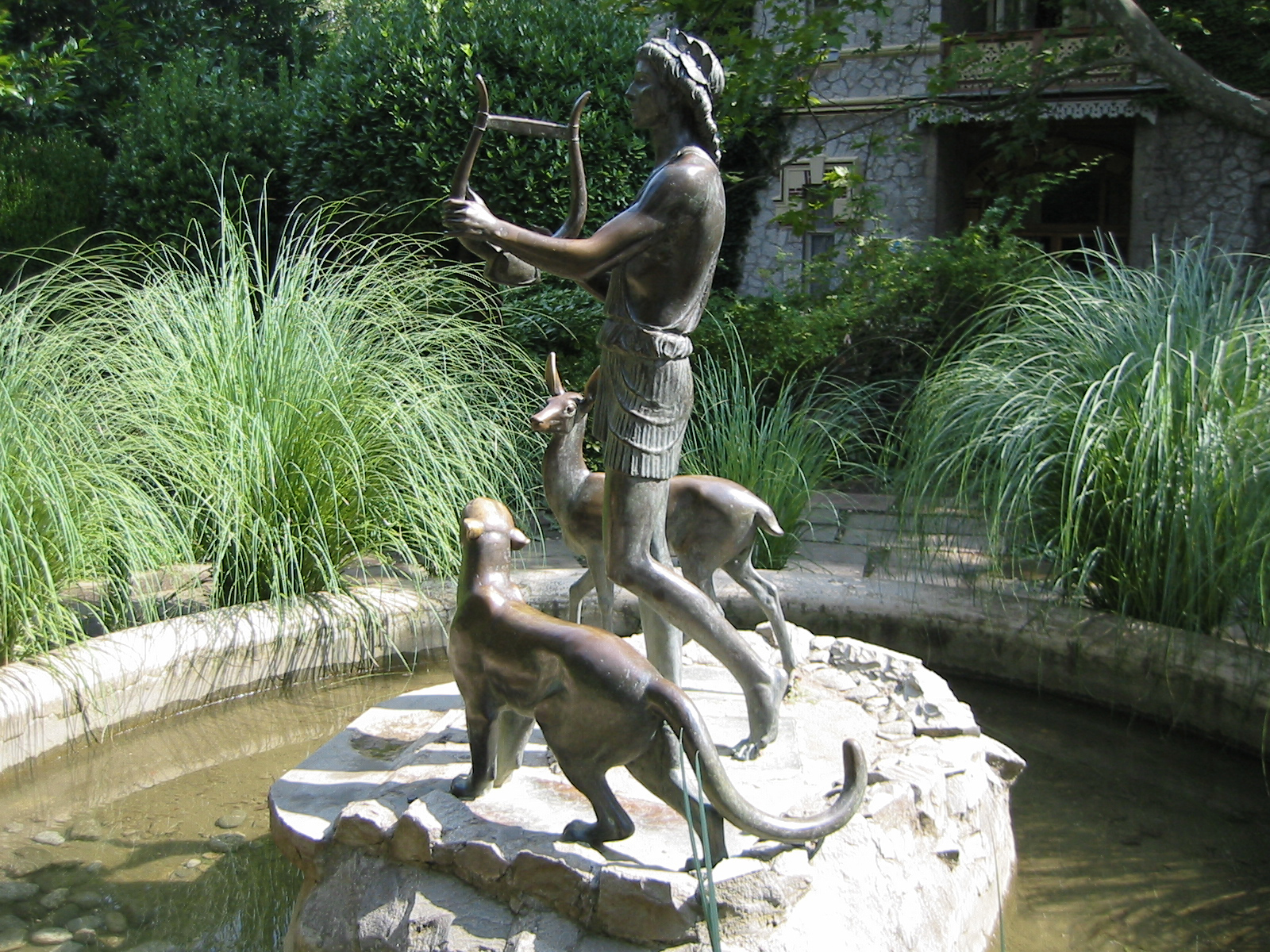
Statue

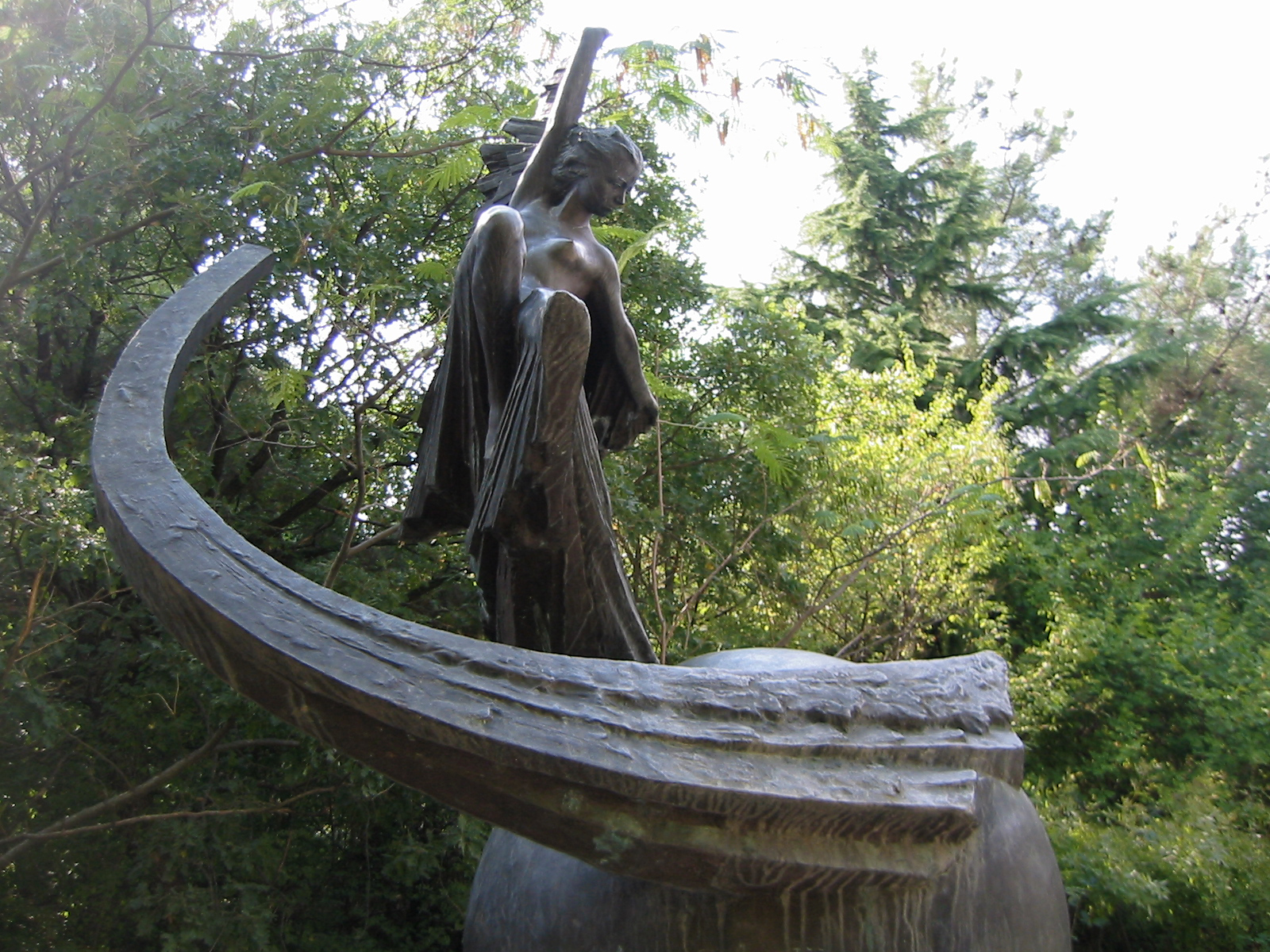
Statue

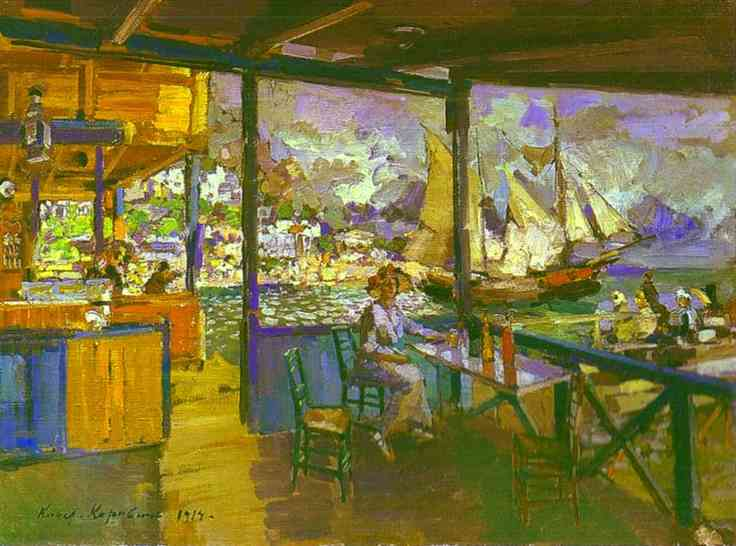
"Pier in Gurzuf" by Konstantin Korovin, 1914

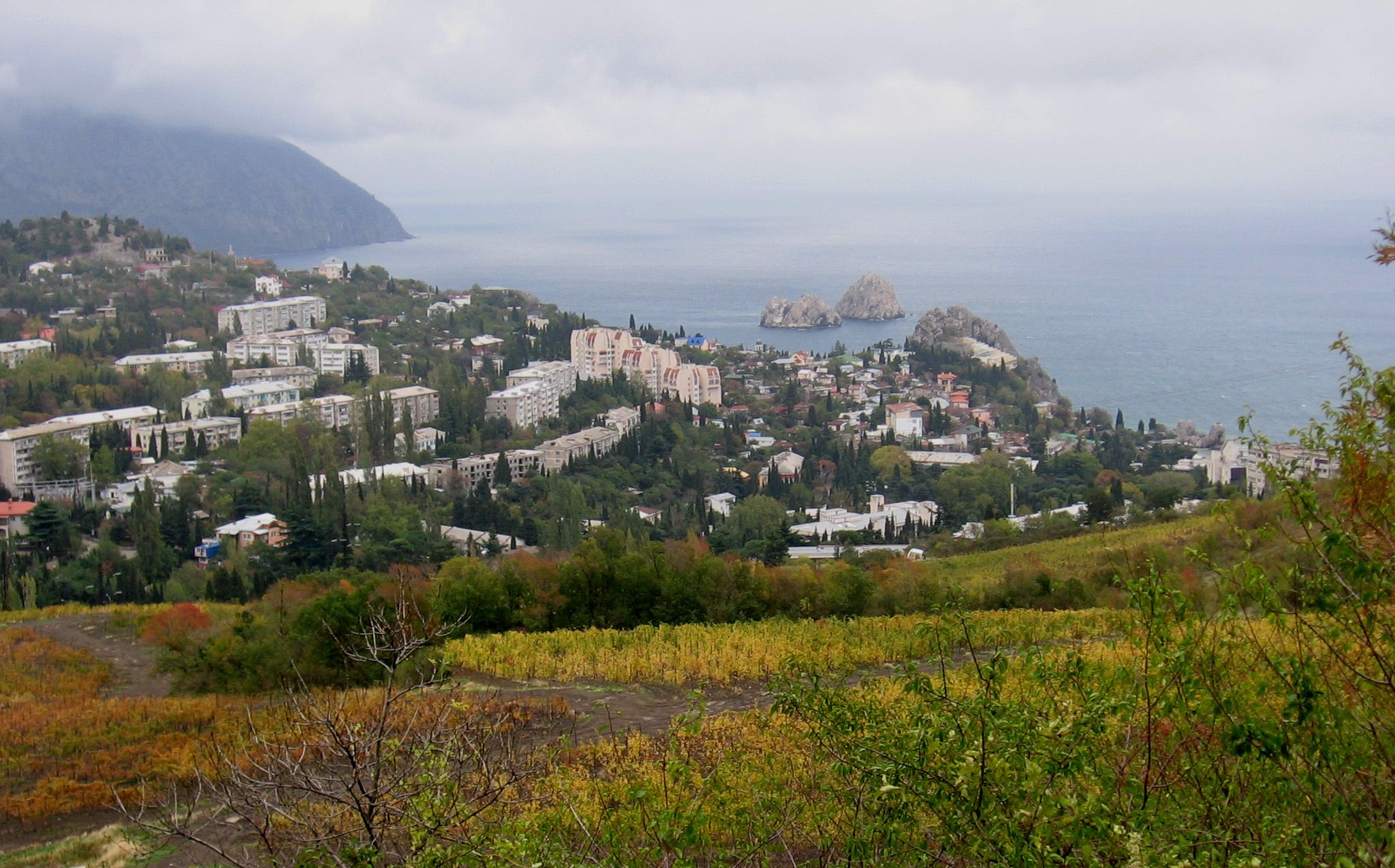
Gurzuf in the fall
