= Kerim Bekirbaev =

Crimean Tatar aircraft designer (1928–1997)

- Born: 13 October 1928; Dnepropetrovsk, Ukrainian SSR, USSR
- Died: 1 July 1997 (aged 68); Zhukovsky, Moscow oblast, Russian Federation
- Citizenship: USSR → Russia
- Education: Moscow Aviation Institute
- Awards: Hero of Socialist Labour

Kerim Bekirbaev (Russian: Керим Бекирович Бекирбаев; 13 October 1928 – 1 July 1997) was a Crimean Tatar aircraft designer of the Soviet Union specializing in development of vertical takeoff aircraft for which he was awarded the title Hero of Socialist Labour in 1981.

== Early life ==
Bekirbaev was born on 13 October 1928 in Dnepropetrovsk to a working-class family; his father, a Crimean Tatar, worked in mining, while his mother, a Russian, was a schoolteacher. In 1931 the family moved to Taganrog, where they survived the German occupation from 1941 to 1943. After the city was liberated he attended the Taganrog Aviation Technical School in addition to evening school, which he graduated from in 1946. Due to not living in Crimea and having a Russian mother, he was able to avoid the exile that most other Crimean Tatars faced by "passing". Nonetheless, he did not completely disown his Crimean Tatar origins, choosing to keep his surname and giving his children Crimean Tatar names. Having avoided the special settler system, he was admitted to the Moscow Aviation Institute, which he graduated from in 1952.

== Aviation career ==
After graduating from MAI he got a job at OKB No.115 as an aerodynamic engineer; the design bureau was later renamed to the Moscow Machine-Building Plant "Speed" in 1966, and is currently the Experimental Design Bureau named after A.S. Yakovlev. Shortly after getting the job he went on to complete the advanced training courses for lead engineers of flight tests at the Aviation Industry Academy in 1953, after which he became a lead flight test engineer. In 1960 he became the head of flight test department at the flight test complex; he then moved on to become the lead designer for flight tests in 1963, and was subsequently promoted to deputy chief designer for flight tests in 1961, acting chief designer for flight tests in 1971, and finally chief designer for flight tests 1975. For his work in developing aviation technology he was awarded the title Hero of Socialist Labour on 23 June 1981, as well as other honours. After retiring from the institute in March 1989 he went on to work as a leading researcher at the Central Aerohydrodynamic Institute from 1990 to 1991, after which he became one of the founders of a Russian airline. During his career he became one of the leading specialists in development of vertical takeoff aircraft; he was the lead flight test engineer for development of the Yak-36, and then he supervised the development of the Yak-38, which entered into service in the Soviet Navy in 1977. He later worked on the creation of a Yak-141 improved vertical takeoff aircraft; the project developed a prototype an conducting test flights, but the project was cancelled due to cuts in the defense budget before it could be finished. In addition to working on vertical takeoff aircraft, he participated in the testing and modifying of the Yak-25 and Yak-27 fighters, as well and the development of the Yak-28 supersonic bomber, Yak-50 and Yak-52 trainers, and the Yak-55 sport plane. He also was the head of testing and development of the short-range Yak-40 and medium-range Yak-42. As part of his job he often actively participated in test flights, and became close friends with test pilot Amet-khan Sultan, who lived in the same apartment building in Zhukhovsky as him. Bekirbaev died of a terminal illness on 1 July 1997 and was buried in the Bykovo cemetery.

== Awards ==
- Hero of Socialist Labour (23 June 1981)
- USSR State Prize (1977)
- Order of Lenin (23 June 1981)
- Order of the October Revolution (26 April 1971)
- Order of the Badge of Honour (22 July 1966)
- Honoured Aircraft Builder (28 September 1988)
