= Emel Emin =

Romanian Crimean Tatar poet and Turkologist

- Born: December 12, 1938 (age 87); Pazarjik, Dobruja, Kingdom of Romania (now Dobrich, Bulgaria)
- Occupations: Poet, translator, Turkologist, educator
- Writing career
- Language: Turkish, Crimean Tatar, Bulgarian
- Period: 20th century

Emel Emin (Romanian pronunciation: [eˈmel eˈmin]; born December 12, 1938) is a Romanian Crimean Tatar poet, translator, Turkologist and educator. She writes her work in Turkish. Although most of her poetry is free verse, she sometimes uses syllabic verse and she admires Arabic prosody. With love for traditional forms of poetry she also published ghazal and rubayat. She is associated with the Writers' Union of Romania and Turkish Language Association in Turkey.

== Biography ==
Emel was born on 12 December 1938 in what was formerly named Pazarjik, Dobruja, Kingdom of Romania. Soon after that, at the beginning of World War II, Romania ceded Southern Dobruja to Bulgaria and today the town is officially known as Dobrich. During her early years spent in Bulgaria she studied at the Pedagogical High School in Sofia and then, in 1960, she graduated from the Faculty of Philology of Sv. Kliment Ohridski University of Sofia specializing in Oriental studies. She worked as a teacher of Turkish in Dobrich and Belogradets, Varna Province.

In 1967, marrying Atilla in Romania, she resettled to her homeland in Constanța. She was one of the first Turkish language teachers in Romania. Since 1972 she taught at the Pedagogical High School in Constanța. Since 1991 she was a lecturer of Turkish literature at the Faculty of Letters and the college of schoolmasters of Ovidius University of Constanța.

Literary presses and journals she has been published include Renkler (Bucharest), Türk Dili (Ankara), Turnalar (İzmir), IIS (Prizren), Kado (Iași), Karadeniz (Constanța), Hakses (Constanța), Emel (Constanța).

Collections of verses that she published in Romania and Turkey include Umut, Arzu, Hanımeli, and Divan esintisi.
