= Tashkent Ten =

Group of Crimean Tatar civil rights activists

The Tashkent Ten were ten Crimean Tatar civil rights activists tried in Tashkent by the Uzbek Supreme Court from 1 July to 5 August 1969. The trial was sometimes called the Tashkent Process (Russian: Ташкентский процесс).

They were tried under Articles 190-1 of the RSFSR Criminal Code and similar codes of other Soviet republics for activities the prosecutor described as "being actively involved in solving the so-called Crimean Tatar issue [sic]". The case was investigated and prepared by Boris Berezovsky, who had a reputation for specializing in cases of Crimean Tatars.

In line with standard practice at the time, the indictment and prosecution documents consistently labeled Crimean Tatars referred to in them not as Crimean Tatars but as "persons of Tatar nationality" and avoided acknowledging Crimean Tatars to be a distinct ethnic group, and consistently referring to the defendants cause as the "so-called Crimean Tatar issue". During questioning the defendants consistently reasserted that they were of Crimean Tatar nationality.

== Composition of the court ==
The court consisted of judge Kudus Saifutdinov, people's assessors Samoilova and Isfandiarov, prosecutor Enkalov, defense attorneys Zaslavsky, Safonov.

== Defendants ==
- Svetlana Ametova
- Reshat Bayramov
- Ayder Bariev
- Ruslan Eminov
- Ridvan Gafarov
- Izzet Khairov
- Munira Khalilova
- Rollan Kadyev
- Riza Umerov
- Ismail Yazydzhiev

== Bibliography ==
- Aydın, Filiz Tutku (2021). Émigré, Exile, Diaspora, and Transnational Movements of the Crimean Tatars: Preserving the Eternal Flame of Crimea. Springer Nature. ISBN 978-3-030-74124-2.
- Allworth, Edward (1998). The Tatars of Crimea: Return to the Homeland : Studies and Documents. Duke University Press. ISBN 978-0-8223-1994-8.
- Bekirova, Gulnara (2005). Крым и крымские татары в XIX-XX веках: сборник статей [Crimea and Crimean Tatars in the 19th-20th centuries: a collection of articles] (in Russian). Moscow. ISBN 978-5-85167-057-2.
- Fisher, Alan W. (2014). The Crimean Tatars. Hoover Press. ISBN 978-0-8179-6663-8.
- Ташкентский процесс: Суд над десятью представителями крымскотатарского народа (1 июля – 5 августа 1969 г.): Сборник документов с иллюстрациями [Tashkent trial: The trial of ten representatives of the Crimean Tatar people (July 1 - August 5, 1969): Collection of documents with illustrations.] (in Russian). Amsterdam: Alexander Herzen Foundation. 1976.
