= Lilya Budzhurova =

Crimean Tatar poet and journalist

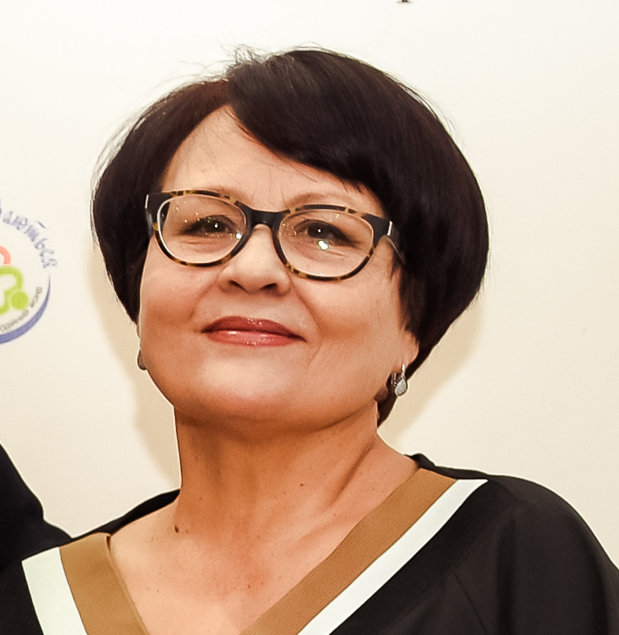
- Born: November 1, 1958 (age 67); Angren, Uzbek SSR, USSR
- Citizenship: Soviet Union, Ukraine, Russia
- Occupations: Poet, journalist

Lilya Rustemovna Budzhurova (Crimean Tatar : Lilâ Rustem qızı Bucurova or Lilya Rustem kyzy Budzhurova, Ukrainian : Lilya Rustemivna Budzhurova), (November 1, 1958 in Angren (Crimea)) is a Crimean Tatar poet and journalist. She became an Honored journalist of Ukraine in 2005.

In 2015 she lost her position at the television channel ATR following the failure of the channel to obtain a license from Roskomnadzor as retaliation for the pro-Ukrainian views broadcast by the channel.

== Biography ==
She was born on November 1, 1958, in the Uzbek city of Angren. In 1979, she graduated from the Faculty of Philology of the Tashkent Regional State Pedagogical Institute. From 1979 to 1991, she worked there as a teacher of Russian and foreign literature.

=== Activity as a journalist ===
In 1989 she published her first self-published collection The Unpurchased Ticket), then the collection When We Will Return. She moved to Crimea in 1991. From 1991 to 1997, she worked as the editor-in-chief of the Crimean Tatar newspaper Avlet: according to her, she was fired for criticizing Mustafa Dzhemilev.

From 1991 to 2011, she worked first as an editor of the Crimean Tatar editorial office, then as a leading editor of the State TV and Radio Company Crimea (radio). Throughout the years, she worked as an editor of the Crimean Tatar newspaper "Avdet", then she hosted the programs "Ana-Yurt", "Danger Zone", and "Chief Editor". From 2004 to 2014, she worked as Editor-in-Chief of the "Pervaya Krymskaya" newspaper, and from 1992 to 2009 – as a correspondent of STB. From 1992 onwards she was as a correspondent of Agence France-Presse. She has been published in the Internet newspaper Ukrainska Pravda and is Chairman of the Crimean Association of Free Journalists since 1997.

In 2012 she became deputy general director for the information policy of the ATR, and author of the political and social TV show "Gravitation".

Budzhurova was issued a formal warning against "extremist views" by prosecutors. She had protested over the increased arrests of Crimean Tatars.

Soon Crimean Tatars will be caught in the streets, on public transport, and at the markets. We're less than a step away from being forced to wear a yellow band on our sleeves, to differentiate us," she wrote on Facebook in April

In March 2015 she warned against compulsory arbitrary registration of crimean media outlets under a russian law leading to the closure of many medias. The ATR shut down in April 2015 as it failed to obtain a license from Roskomnadzor, as retaliation for the pro-Ukrainian views broadcasteby the channel.

Budzhurova left her position as deputy general director for the information policy of the ATR (TV channel) due to the closure of the channel, and started doing humanitarian work. Since August 2015, she has been deputy director of the production studio QaraDeniz production. She is one of the organizers of the annual children's talent contest "Сanlı ses". In 2016, she became one of the founders of the public movement "Bizim Balalar" (Our Children) to support the children of Crimean Muslim prisoners.

In 2019 she helped for the relaease of Archbishop of Simferopol and Crimea Klyment of the Orthodox Church of Ukraine.

=== Politics ===
In 1991 she was elected as a delegate of the II Qurultay of the Crimean Tatar People. She was twice elected to the Mejlis of the Crimean Tatar People (member from 1991 to 1997), and from 1994 to 1998, deputy of the Verkhovna Rada of Crimea. On November 2, 2015, she reported that her house was searched in connection with the criminal case against Lenur Islyamov.

== Awards ==
- Honorary Diploma of the Council of Ministers of Crimea (2000; as a member of the authorship team)
- Laureate of the Vasily Stus Award (2001)
- Chevalier of the Order "For Merits" III degree (2015)
- Award "High standards of journalism" (Ukraine, 2018) – in the category "For quality regional media project", media – Crimean Tatars.

== Publications ==
- BUDZHUROVA, Lilia; Zaks, Dmitry. "Russia welcomes Crimea despite Western sanctions". The Times of Israel. ISSN 0040-7909.
