= Krasnokamenka, Chelyabinsk Oblast =

Village in Uysky District, Chelyabinsk Oblast, Russia

Coordinates: 54.6°N 60.2°E

Krasnokamenka (Russian: Краснока́менка, roughly translated as "red stone settlement") is a village in Uysky District of Chelyabinsk Oblast, Russia. Postal code: 456476.
