= Ayshe Seitmuratova =

Soviet-Ukrainian human rights activist (1937–2025)

Ayşe Seitmuratova
- Айше Сеитмуратова
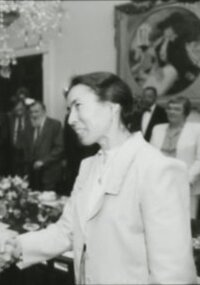
- Born: 11 February 1937; Acı Eli, Russian SFSR, USSR
- Died: 1 June 2025 (aged 88); Russian-occupied Crimea
- Awards: Order For Courage

Ayşe Seitmuratova (also romanized as Aishe or Ayshe; Crimean Tatar Cyrillic: Айше Сеитмуратова; 11 February 1937 – 1 June 2025) was a Crimean Tatar civil rights activist.

== Biography ==
Seitmuratova was born in Crimea on 11 February 1937, seven years before the mass deportation of the Crimean Tatar nation from Crimea (or Sürgünlik), and survived her family's deportation to Uzbekistan as a child. She was Muslim.

Because of her ethnicity, Seitmuratova was designated a "special settler". After academic opportunities for which she was overqualified were denied to her because of this designation, she became an active member of the Crimean Tatar civil rights movement. After advocating for some of the most draconian restrictions on Crimean Tatar civil rights to be lifted and meeting with Soviet leadership, she continued to lobby Moscow for the right of return.

She enrolled in the history faculty at Samarkand University in 1957. She joined the Crimean Tatar national movement in Samarkand Oblast in 1964. Two years later, in 1966, she was arrested for "inciting national hatred", receiving three years of probation. In the meantime, she continued her activism and studies as a graduate student at the Institute of History of the Uzbek Academy of Sciences in Tashkent, where she also worked as a lecturer. She was arrested again in 1971, charged "spreading deliberately false ideas that defame the Soviet state and public order," and sentenced to three years in prison in July, which she spent in a camp in Mordovia, being released in June 1974. She emigrated from the Soviet Union in November 1978, moving first to Vienna and then to the United States in 1979, where she acquired citizenship.

She met U.S. president Ronald Reagan in 1982 and 1988 and participated in many human rights conferences. She became a journalist for the BBC, Deutsche Welle and Voice of America, talking about the issues affecting the Crimean Tatar people and their history, including of russification efforts by Russia.

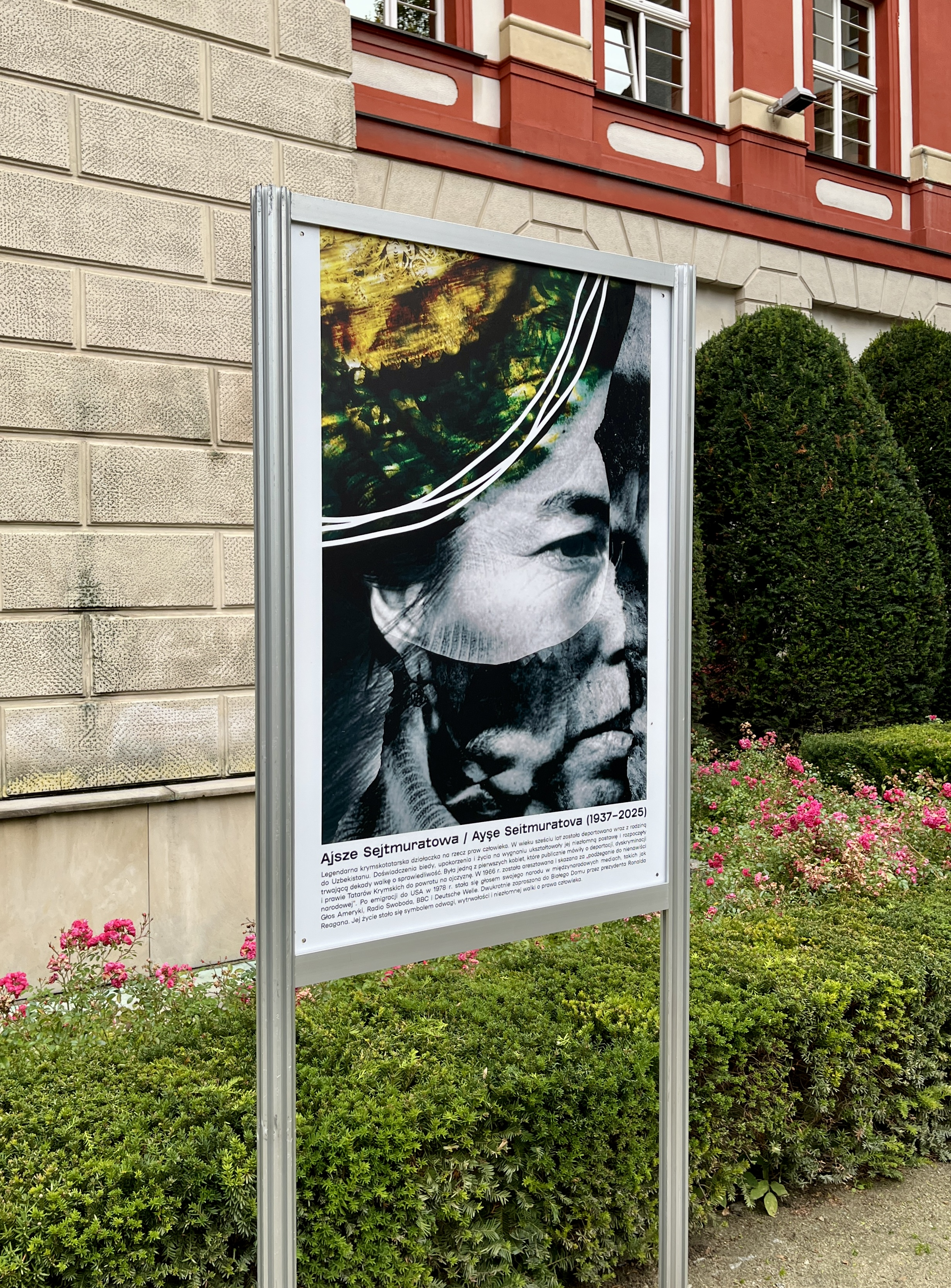
The stand dedicated to Ayşe Seitmuratova at the exhibition «She is Crimea, She is World» by the Krymski Dom Foundation in Wrocław (Poland), October 2025

Seitmuratova was able to return to Crimea in 1990, living there for the rest of her life. Despite not supporting the Russian annexation of Crimea, she was highly critical of some of the actions of Mustafa Dzhemilev and his Mejlis faction. She died in Russian-occupied Crimea on 1 June 2025, at the age of 88.
