= Ayshe Dittanova =

Crimean tatar actress

Ayşe Dittanova

Ayşe Dittanova (Crimean Tatar: Ayşe Dittan; 27 February 1918 – 15 November 2015) was a Crimean actress, initiator of the revival of the Crimean Tatar Drama Theater. Honored Artist of Ukraine (1993).

== Early life and education ==
Ayşe Dittanova was born on 27 February 1918 in village of Dereköy (now abolished village in Crimea, included in the city of Yalta). In 1933, Dittanova graduated from the Simferopol Theater College. After graduation she began working in the troupe of the Crimean Drama Theater.

== Career ==
In 1937 the repressions against the Crimean Tatars have started in the USSR and the spouses of Dittanova's sisters were accused of “treason” and murdered. Despite all the difficulties, Dittanova did not leave the theater, although she was given small episodic roles. Her role in the play The Fountain of Bakhchisarai is considered the most significant in Dittanova's stage career.

In 1938, Dittanova married Mecit Asanov who also worked at the Crimean Tatar Theater and they raised two daughters and one son.

When the World War II started, Dittanova along with other stage actors was holding demonstrations for soldiers in Crimea, and in 1944 she was exiled to Leninabad, Tajikistan. There from 1946 to 1951 she continued her career of a theater actress in Leninabad Russian Drama Theater. Due to the totalitarian policy of the USSR, Dittanova, like other actors of Crimean Tatar origin, was not allowed to engage in national art.

In 1989, Dittanova returned to Crimea and immediately started working on the restoration of the Crimean Tatar Theater. Once the theater was restored, Dittanova worked there from 1990 to 1996.

In 1993, Dittanova was awarded a title of an Honored Artist of Ukraine for a significant contribution to the development of culture. From 1996 she lived in New York. She repeatedly visited Crimea and in 2010 participated in a creative meeting in the Crimean Tatar Library in Simferopol.

In 2014 she spoke at the ceremony dedicated to the 70th anniversary of the deportation of Crimean Tatars which took place at UN headquarters in New York.

Ayşe Dittanova died on 15 November 2015 in New York.
