= Zarema =

Ukrainian-Crimean Tatar singer, songwriter, and actress

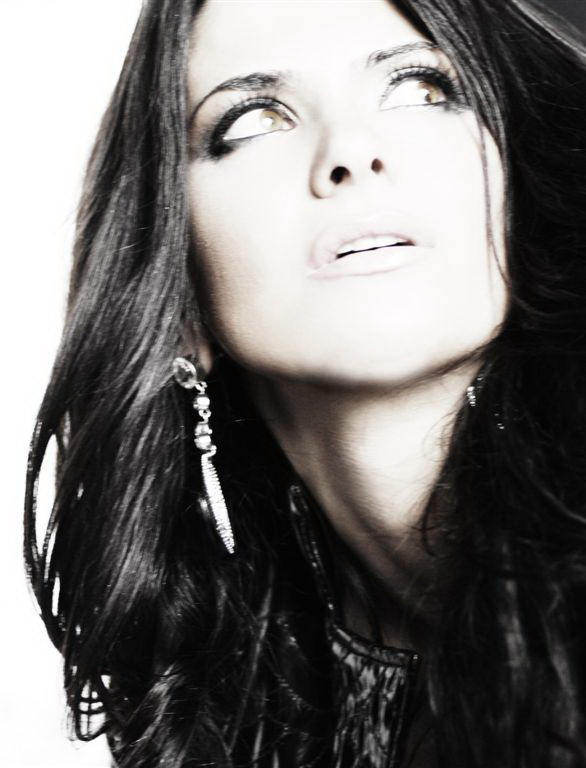
- Zarema on set of music video, "Atak"

Background information
- Born: Zarema
- Occupations: Singer/songwriter, Actress
- Instrument: Vocals
- Years active: 2005–present
- Labels: Sony BMG Music Entertainment Turkey, 2007
- Website: www.zarema.com

Zarema (Halilova) is a Crimean singer, songwriter and actress of Crimean Tatar descent. She was born while the ethnic Crimean Tatars were in deportation in Uzbekistan, having been expelled from their native lands on the Crimean Peninsula in the Black Sea as part of the USSR's ethnic cleansing (later recognized as genocide by the Ukrainian government in November, 2015). It was not until 1989, after the fall of the USSR that the Crimean Tatars were allowed to return to their homeland of Crimea.

After graduating with a bachelor's degree in acting for dramatic theatre and film from the National University of Theatre, Film and Television in Kyiv, Ukraine, Zarema learned to speak Turkish and wrote several songs in Turkish. In 2007, she signed a recording contract with Sony BMG Music Entertainment Turkey and relocated to Istanbul for one year. There she released her self-titled debut Turkish language album, which went on to achieve critical acclaim throughout Europe. Her music video "Atak" reached number one music video status on many television channels in Turkey, including Kral TV, Genç TV, MTV, Number One TV, and Viva! TV and was the first ever video in Turkey to exceed 400,000 views on YouTube.com.

In late 2008, Zarema moved to Los Angeles, California and in 2012 became a United States citizen. She has written many songs in English, a number of which have attracted considerable attention on online Music pools and have been played on numerous American radio stations.

With a degree in theater and film, Zarema has also pursued an acting career in the United States, graduating from the Stella Adler Studio of Acting in Hollywood and studying under various reputable acting coaches. She became a member of the American Federation of Television and Radio Artists (AFTRA) in 2009 and in 2010 became a member of the Screen Actors Guild (SAG), now the combined SAG-AFTRA.

Fluent in Russian, Turkish, Ukrainian, Crimean Tatar, and English, Zarema has been sought after for her multi-lingual voice-over work, performing on numerous popular movies and television shows.

== Early life ==
Spending her early childhood in Uzbekistan, Zarema was surrounded by a musical family. Her grandparents all had a passion for singing, as did her father, and she and her siblings followed suit. Zarema herself decided at the age of four that she wanted to become a singer and she sang in music contests and school performances at every opportunity.

When Crimean Tatars were allowed to return from deportation, Zarema's family moved to their national homeland of Crimea in the Black Sea, and it was there that she wrote her first lyrics and songs in the Crimean Tatar language. By the time Zarema was eight years old, she had begun studying piano and from age 9 until she graduated from high school, she studied piano, violin, solfeggio, and chorus.

Many of her song lyrics were inspired by the tormented Crimean Tatar history, and her patriotism and strong affinity for her cultural homeland of Crimea. For several years, Zarema was enlisted to read her lyrics at the annual commemorative ceremony at the grave of the legendary Crimean Tatar poet, Eshref Shemyi-zade, who in 1978 had been laid to rest in a cemetery near her hometown.

At age 10, Zarema gave her first radio interview and at age 11 she submitted some of her lyrics to Crimea's biggest newspaper, Dostluk and the lyrics were subsequently published in the paper. Shortly thereafter, Zarema was paid a visit at her family home by representatives of Dostluk. It was they who recommended that Zarema attend the Artek Children's Camp in Hurzuf, Crimea and sponsored her attendance there that Summer. Her lyrics were also later published in various other Crimean newspapers and magazines.

Throughout her childhood, Zarema performed in the town hall in her hometown as the lead singer of the band, both for routine performances and for holidays and special occasions. She often organized and produced neighborhood music performances, as well.

At age 13, Zarema produced her first video of her original song, "Ayi-Dag" and it was played on Crimean television station, Крым (National Television and Radio).

Zarema was participating in regional and national music competitions and festivals by age 15 and as a young adult, Zarema moved to Kyiv, Ukraine to attend university. Later, she was invited back to Artek to sing her original music, performing in front of the President of Ukraine, Leonid Kuchma.

== Education and career ==
Zarema attended the National University of Theatre, Film and Television in Kyiv, Ukraine, where she studied acting for dramatic theatre and film, graduating with a bachelor's degree.

The following year, Zarema met renowned Ukrainian music producer, Mikhail Nekrasov, and collaborated with him to co-write the songs, "Savash" and "Hop Soyle". Written in Turkish, both of these songs achieved critical acclaim and were played extensively on radio stations, music channels and nightclubs in many countries throughout Europe, Asia, Canada and Israel. She gave live performances on various radio stations and TV programs.

The success of "Savash" and "Hop Soyle" drew the attention of Sony BMG Music Entertainment Turkey and she ultimately signed a recording contract with Sony to record her debut Turkish album. Writing her own music and lyrics, Zarema collaborated with the legendary Turkish producer, Ozan Colakoglu and his production company, Sarı Ev (Yellow House), and also Mustafa Ceceli, Özgür Buldum, and other well-known Turkish producers to produce and promote her self-titled debut album.

Zarema shot a music video for Atak, one of the songs from the album, in Kyiv with the well-known Ukrainian video director, Alan Badoev. The video was widely viewed and Zarema became the first ever artist in Turkey to exceed 400,000 views on YouTube. In 2008, her video became the number one video on all of the most popular music channels in Turkey, including Kral, Genc TV, Viva TV, Number One TV, and Dream TV.

Zarema's music gained significant media attention and she was featured in numerous newspapers and magazines, appearing on the cover of many, including Hurriyet, Milliyet, Sabah, Vatan, Takvim, and others.

In promoting her album, Zarema performed concerts in many well-known venues around the world, performing in front of 10,000 spectators in Baku, Azerbaijan and 20,000 in Moscow's Olimpijskij stadium.

After touring to promote her album with Sony Music Turkey, Zarema relocated to Los Angeles[29], California and began a new phase of her life. There she learned to speak English and in 2012 became a US citizen.

=== Acting Career ===
As a university-trained actress, Zarema began pursuing an acting career in Los Angeles, graduating from the Stella Adler Academy of Acting in Hollywood and studying under various reputable acting coaches. She became a member of the American Federation of Television and Radio Artists (AFTRA) in 2009 and in 2010 became a member of the Screen Actors Guild (SAG), now the combined SAG-AFTRA.

Fluent in Russian, Turkish, Ukrainian, Crimean Tatar, and English, Zarema has been sought after for her multi-lingual voice-over work, performing on numerous popular movies and television shows, including "Madam Secretary", "MacGyver", "Charlie's Angels", "6 Underground", "Homeland", "Criminal Minds", "Castle", "Cypher", "Arrow", "Wayne", "Covert Affairs", "Darkest Hour", "Legends of Tomorrow", "Jack Ryan", "The Brave", "Taken", "Whiskey Cavalier","NCIS", "SEAL Team (TV series)", "The Queen's Gambit (miniseries)", "For All Mankind (TV Series)", "Without Remorse" and "Ava's Impossible Things" (2016 film).

=== Music career ===
In addition to pursuing her acting career in the US, Zarema has also written many songs in English, a number of which have attracted considerable attention on online Music pools and have been played on numerous American radio stations.

==== Song: Night of My Life ====
In 2018, Zarema recorded and released a new English language song, "Night of My Life", produced and co-written by multiple-Grammy Award-winning producer, RedOne. Zarema was inspired to work with RedOne by his journey from humble beginnings in Morocco to his musical debut in Sweden, followed by his meteoric rise in the US, with his prominent hit songs like "Just Dance", "Poker Face", "Bad Romance", and "Alejandro" for Lady Gaga, "On the Floor" for Jennifer Lopez and Pitbull, "Rain Over Me" for Marc Anthony and Pitbull, "C'est la Vie" for Khaled, and "I Like It" for Enrique Iglesias. The melody for "Night of My Life" was co-written by RedOne and Zarema and the lyrics were co-written by Zarema and John Anthony Russell. "Night of My Life" was released in numerous countries by Roton Music of Romania and Dogan Music of Turkey.

==== Song: I Hold You Child ====
In more recent times, after seeing the immense suffering of so many refugee children around the world, Zarema was inspired to write a song called "I Hold You Child" about a refugee mother and her child desperately fleeing from a war zone, leaving their husband/father behind to fight in the war. Her lyrics quote the mother speaking to her child about their "fragile lives" and covering her child's eyes to shield the child from the horrible sights of war and the night "skies on fire," as she comforts her child with their hopes of returning to "Daddy's safe arms."

After a great deal of searching for just the right music director, Zarema was fortunate enough to get in contact with Marc Klasfeld, the well-known creator of See You Again with Wiz Khalifa featuring Charlie Puth, one of the most-watched videos on YouTube. Meeting Zarema, hearing the song, and considering the cause that it advocated for, Klasfeld agreed to create a video for "I Hold You Child."

Zarema released the song and video on May 11, 2025, in observance of Mother's Day in the United States.

==== Song: Closure ====
Initially inspired by a personal loss in her own family, Zarema later wrote a song called “Closure” for everyone who has suffered an unexpected loss of a close relative or loved one, or even a cherished relationship.

In her lyrics, she identifies with her listeners and acknowledges their feelings of loss and helplessness, saying “… it isn't over, you couldn't say goodbye to give you closure”. In hopes that hearing the song comforts them and reminds them they’re not alone in their grief and that others empathize with them, she poignantly observes,

Day by day you're looking at your door,

You wait, but no one's there.

Can't delete that number on your phone,

You're hoping they're still there.

Hoping to help them accept their loss and hoping that at some point they’ll find peace in closure, she writes optimistically, “Took every picture off the wall, Learning how to live with letting go”. She ends with a plaintive lament,

If you had a chance to say goodbye and all of your regrets,

If you had a chance to hold them close before they left,

If you had a chance just one more time to look them in the face,

If you had a chance to say your love will never end.

Initially produced by Vic Latino and later David Alexander, Zarema released “Closure” in December, 2025 and January, 2026. Many online articles mention or feature the song.

==== Song: Child’s Prayer ====
Zarema found herself impressed by a documentary about refugee children severely affected by wars, and was particularly moved by the story of a young girl who had suffered amputation of one of her legs and lost her mother in a single airstrike. While the child was in the hospital and calling-out for her mother, her grandmother had tried to comfort her by telling her that she should go outside and look up at the night sky to find the brightest star, because that’s where she could find her mother. So after that, every night, this little girl would go outside and look up at the stars to talk to her mother.

Struck by that heartbreaking story, and on the encouragement of her parents, Zarema set out to write a song about that little girl. She immediately wrote the melody for the song and then later wrote the lyrics from the perspective of a young child, talking to the stars to communicate with her mother, clinging to the only remaining connection she had with her. The child would say,

I wonder if you're listening?

Are you watching over me?

Mama, can you hear my prayer?

I'm so lonely here.

The little child, in her lonely desolation, would use this connection to her mother to say her nightly prayers,

Mama, please tell the angels in heaven,

To save all the children God’s given.

When I look up to the stars,

I know you’re gone but you’re always in my heart.

Zarema, with her own background growing up a member of the marginalized and oppressed Crimean Tatars, indigenous to Crimea, was motivated to take up the cause of all refugee child victims of the many wars around the world. Many of them are overlooked by society and even when wars are over, many are left to face life-long struggles, emotionally alone. She said “I could never stand to see any child suffer indignities or be made to feel inferior, insignificant, or insecure. So I wrote this song to honor all refugee children, especially those who have lost their parents or who have suffered life-altering injuries due to such horrible events, events that seem to happen all too often around the world today.”

She went on to say, “When I finished the music and lyrics for this song, I had the amazing good fortune of being introduced to Grammy winning composer and producer, Kitt Wakeley. I sent him my song and he was immediately on-board, and enthusiastically agreed to produce the song!” To her great delight, she said, “I was astounded to learn that Kitt was able to record the song with the Royal Philharmonic Orchestra, with Cliff Masterson conducting, at the legendary Abbey Road Studios in London.”

“Child’s Prayer” was released both with lyrics and as a purely instrumental piece. The song drew international attention and was covered in articles in many online magazines.

Zarema expressed gratitude to Wakeley and the Royal Philharmonic Orchestra for their contributions to the song, stating that the project drew attention to the needs of orphaned and amputee refugee children. She expressed concern regarding the challenges faced by children affected by war.
