= Teyfuq Abdul =

Soviet Crimean Tatar military commander (1915–1945)

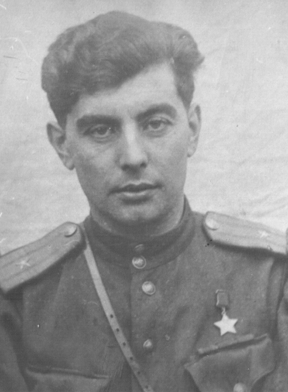
- Born: 24 December [O.S. 11 December] 1915; Partenit, Taurida Governorate, Russian Empire (now Crimea)
- Died: 18 March 1945 (aged 29); Ober, Nazi Germany
- Military career
- Allegiance: Soviet Union
- Branch: Red Army
- Service years: 1939–1945
- Rank: Major
- Units: 412th Rifle Regiment; 175th Guards Rifle Regiment; 178th Guards Rifle Regiment
- Conflicts: World War II †
- Awards: Hero of the Soviet Union

Teyfuq Amit oğlu Abdul (Russian: Тейфук Амитович Абдуль, romanized: Teyfuk Amitovich Abdul; 24 December [O.S. 11 December] 1915 – 18 March 1945) was a Crimean Tatar Hero of the Soviet Union who served as the commander of the 2nd battalion of the 175th Guards Rifle Regiment during the World War II.

He was drafted into the Red Army in November, 1939 after graduating from the M.V. Frunze Crimean Pedagogical Institute and working as a school teacher. He trained at the Orel Infantry School before being deployed as a junior lieutenant with the 412th Rifle Regiment following the German invasion of the Soviet Union. He fought on multiple fronts, was wounded several times, and rose to the position of battalion commander by late 1941. In 1942, he completed a sharpshooting course and joined the Communist Party.

In September 1943, as captain and commander of the 2nd Rifle Battalion of the 175th Guards Rifle Regiment, he led a successful crossing of the Dnieper River, capturing and holding a strategic bridgehead that allowed for the transfer of the main regiment forces. For this action, he was awarded the title Hero of the Soviet Union in December 1943. In 1944, he was appointed deputy commander of the 178th Guards Rifle Regiment and participated in several major Soviet offensives.

== Early life ==
Abdul was born on 24 December [O.S. 11 December] 1915 to a Crimean Tatar peasant family in the village of Partenit before the formation of the Soviet Union; he had five siblings. Many people in his family were veterans of the Russo-Japanese War. After graduating from eight years of school in his hometown he attended the Yalta Pedagogical College, which he graduated from in 1935 and later the M.V. Frunze Crimean Pedagogical Institute. In 1935 he began working as a schoolteacher and later as the head of a school while still studying at the pedagogical institute. After graduating from the institute in 1939 he was drafted into the Red Army in November.

== World War II ==
After being drafted into the Red Army he attended the Orel Infantry School before being deployed to the warfront upon the German invasion of the Soviet Union with the rank of junior lieutenant as part of the 412th Rifle Regiment. He saw combat on the Western, Don, South-Western and Steppe fronts. He was seriously wounded twice during the second half of 1941, and by the end of 1941 he was promoted to position of battalion commander. After graduating from a sharpshooting course in 1942 he was continued to serve as battalion commander until he was seriously wounded again in December. That same year he joined the Communist party.

After recovering from his injuries in the hospital he returned to combat and participated in the battle of the Dnieper as commander of the 2nd Rifle Battalion of the 175th Guards Rifle Regiment in the 58th Guards Rifle Division of the 57th Army on the Steppe Front with the rank of captain. On 26 September 1943 Abdul led his battalion across the Dnieper through a smokescreen and seized one of the first bridgeheads, doing from the strip of land near the village Verkhnedneprovsk to the small island of Pushkarevsky. They held the bridgehead for several days, permitting the transfer of the main forces of the regiment across the river and destroying large quantities of enemy equipment and manpower in the process. After leading the crossing in September he was wounded in battle again and hospitalized. While in the hospital he met Guard Lieutenant Mariya Stepanova Kochina, whom he soon married.

For his success in leading the crossing he was declared a Hero of the Soviet Union on 20 December 1943. Upon returning to the front he fought in the Lvov–Sandomierz, Vistula–Oder, and Silesian offensives, and in 1944 he was appointed deputy commander of the 178th Guards Rifle Regiment. In May that year his family was deported to Central Asia because they were Crimean Tatars after the Red Army took control of Crimea; his status as a war hero did not save his mother and sisters from being considered "traitors" due to their ethnicity, and he eventually learned of their exile to the Uzbek SSR via a letter. On 18 March 1945 he was killed in action during the Upper Silesian Offensive and was buried on the Hill of Glory in Lviv. The farewell address at his funeral was made by Marshal Konstantin Rokossovsky. His wife Mariya had not received a letter from him since March and was not notified of his death until 1948 when she received a letter from the chairman of the Supreme Soviet Nikolai Shvernik that he was killed in action. A street was named in his honor in Simferopol and an obelisk in his honor was built in Crimea in 2014.

== Awards and honors ==
- Hero of the Soviet Union (20 December 1943)
- Order of Lenin (20 December 1943)
- Order of the Red Banner (24 March 1945)
- Order of the Patriotic War 1st class (6 August 1943)
- Order of the Patriotic War 2nd class (4 November 1943)
