= Krasnokamianka (village) =

Krasnokamianka: Краснокам'янка; Краснокаменка; Qızıltaş
- Village
- Location of Krasnokamianka within Crimea
- Coordinates: 44°55′24.8″N 35°4′31.58″E
- Country: Disputed, Ukraine
- Republic: Crimea
- Region: Feodosia municipality
- Elevation: 430 m (1,410 ft)

Population (2014)
  - Total: 1,150
- Time zone: UTC+4 (Kyiv)
- Postal code: 98187
- Former names: Kiziltash, Kyzyltash

Krasnokamianka, also known as Kiziltash or Kyzyltash, is a village situated in the Feodosia municipality of the Autonomous Republic of Crimea. The name Krasnokamianka translates to "Red Stone Place" in Ukrainian, "Краснока́менка" in Russian, and "Qızıltaş" in Crimean Tatar. This village is located in the Autonomous Republic of Crimea which is recognized by the majority of countries as part of Ukraine but currently occupied by Russia and referred to as the Republic of Crimea. As of the 2014 Census, the population of Krasnokamianka was 1,150.

== History ==
The mountain slopes of the Kyzyltash tract are covered with forests consisting of downy oak, sessile oak, and common hornbeam. Within this area, one can often find common relict plants, some of which are listed in the Red Book of Ukraine. These include Greek juniper, pistacia atlantica, and various species of orchids.

The highest peak in the vicinity, Sandyk-Kaya ("Stone forehead") stands 698 meters above sea level.

In the late 1950s, the Council of Ministers of the USSR made a decision to establish a central database for the storage of nuclear weapons known as TSBH. TSBH stands for "organizations that carry out the assembly and storage of nuclear weapons", specifically referring to the facilities responsible for handling the nuclear weapons produced by the factories under the Ministry of Medium Machine Building (USSR Minsredmash, MSM USSR). The purpose of the TSBH was to centralize and streamline the management and storage of nuclear weapons within the Soviet Union.

The first central database storage, referred to as Object C, was located in the southern region of Crimea within the military unit (B/W) 62047 in Krasnokamianka, also known as Simferopol-10 or Theodosius-13. This facility, officially named Object 712, was under the command of M. Nemirovsky. It served as a storage site for nuclear weapons within the Soviet Union.

In post-Soviet Ukraine, the 47th Regiment of Special Purpose, which belonged to the Crimean Territorial Command of the Interior Troops of Ukraine, was stationed in Krasnokamianka. This regiment was commonly known as the "Tiger" and was assigned to military unit (a/h) 4125.

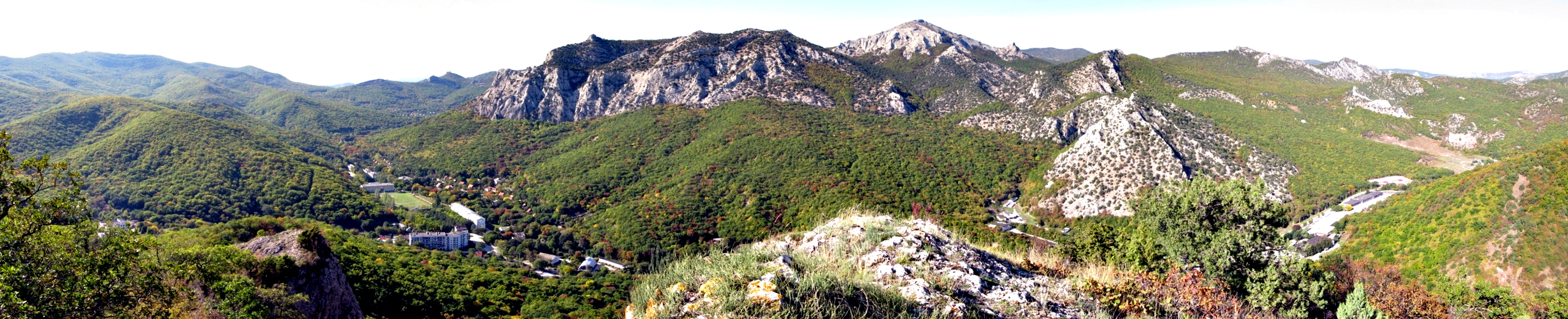
Panorama of Krasnokamianka
