= Seytnafe Seytveliyev =

Soviet Crimean Tatar gunner (1919–1983)

- Born: 29 May 1919; Tav-Kipchak village, Simferopolsky Uyezd, Taurida Governorate, RSFSR
- Died: 13 March 1983 (aged 63); Leninabad, Tajik SSR, USSR
- Military career
- Allegiance: Soviet Union
- Branch: Red Army
- Service years: 1939–1946
- Rank: Sergeant-major
- Unit: 350th Rifle Regiment
- Conflicts: World War II
- Awards: Hero of the Soviet Union

Seytnafe Seytveliyev (Crimean Tatar: Seyitnafe Seyitveliyev, Russian: Сейтнафе Сейтвелиев; 29 May 1919 – 13 March 1983) was a gunner in the Red Army during the Second World War and Hero of the Soviet Union. Despite taking out numerous enemy tanks and being a decorated veteran of the war, he was deported to Central Asia in 1946 because of his Crimean Tatar ethnicity.

== Early life ==
Seytveliyev was born on 29 May 1919 in the Tav-Kipchak village to a Crimean Tatar peasant family. After completing secondary school he worked at a collectivized grape farm until he was drafted into the Red Army in 1939 and assigned to the Odessa military district.

== World War II ==
After being drafted into the Red Army, he graduated from the junior commander's school and entered combat immediately upon the German invasion of the Soviet Union. Throughout the beginning of the war he participated in the Kerch landing, as well as in the battles for Sevastopol, Odessa, Stalingrad, Kursk, Bryansk, Gomel, Poland, Prussia, and the Baltics.

He was wounded in December 1942 during the Battle of Stalingrad and hospitalized for two months. Seytveliyev began to distinguish himself on 25 June 1944 in the fighting for the Gomel region of occupied Belarus. In the process of breaking through enemy defenses and repulsing counterattacks, he suppressed multiple enemy firing point as well as two tanks, all under heavy enemy fire. When his regiment was deployed to the Minsk region to attack a column of containing 40 enemy tanks, he managed to hit a total of 15 enemy tanks during the week-long battle. For his actions in Belarus he was awarded the Order of the Red Banner and nominated for the title Hero of the Soviet Union. On 25 September 1944 he was declared a Hero of the Soviet Union by decree of the Supreme Soviet, which he learned of while fighting for the town of Ostroleka in Poland. He continued to fight across Eastern Europe, reaching East Prussia in the winter of 1945, after which he reached the coast of the Baltic Sea and was demobilized in 1946.

== Postwar life and exile ==
After being demobilized in 1946, and despite his status as a war hero, he was deported to Central Asia due to his Crimean Tatar ethnicity. His mother Momine, who was subject to deportation from Crimea in 1944, died of starvation and was buried in a mass grave shortly thereafter and he never had the chance to see her again. Residing in exile in Tajik SSR, he worked in agriculture, at a glass factory, and as a teacher before he died in Leninabad on 13 March 1983, before the Crimean Tatar people received the full right to return in 1989. While in exile he participated in the Crimean Tatar civil rights movement.

== Awards and honors ==
- Hero of the Soviet Union (25 September 1944)
- Order of Lenin (25 September 1944)
- Order of the Red Banner (28 August 1944)
- Order of the Patriotic War 1st class (23 July 1945)
- Medal "For Courage" (26 December 1943)
- Medal "For Battle Merit" (27 August 1943)
- Honorary citizen of Minsk
