= Krasnokamianka, Crimea =

Krasnokamianka Краснокам'янка Краснокаменка Qızıltaş
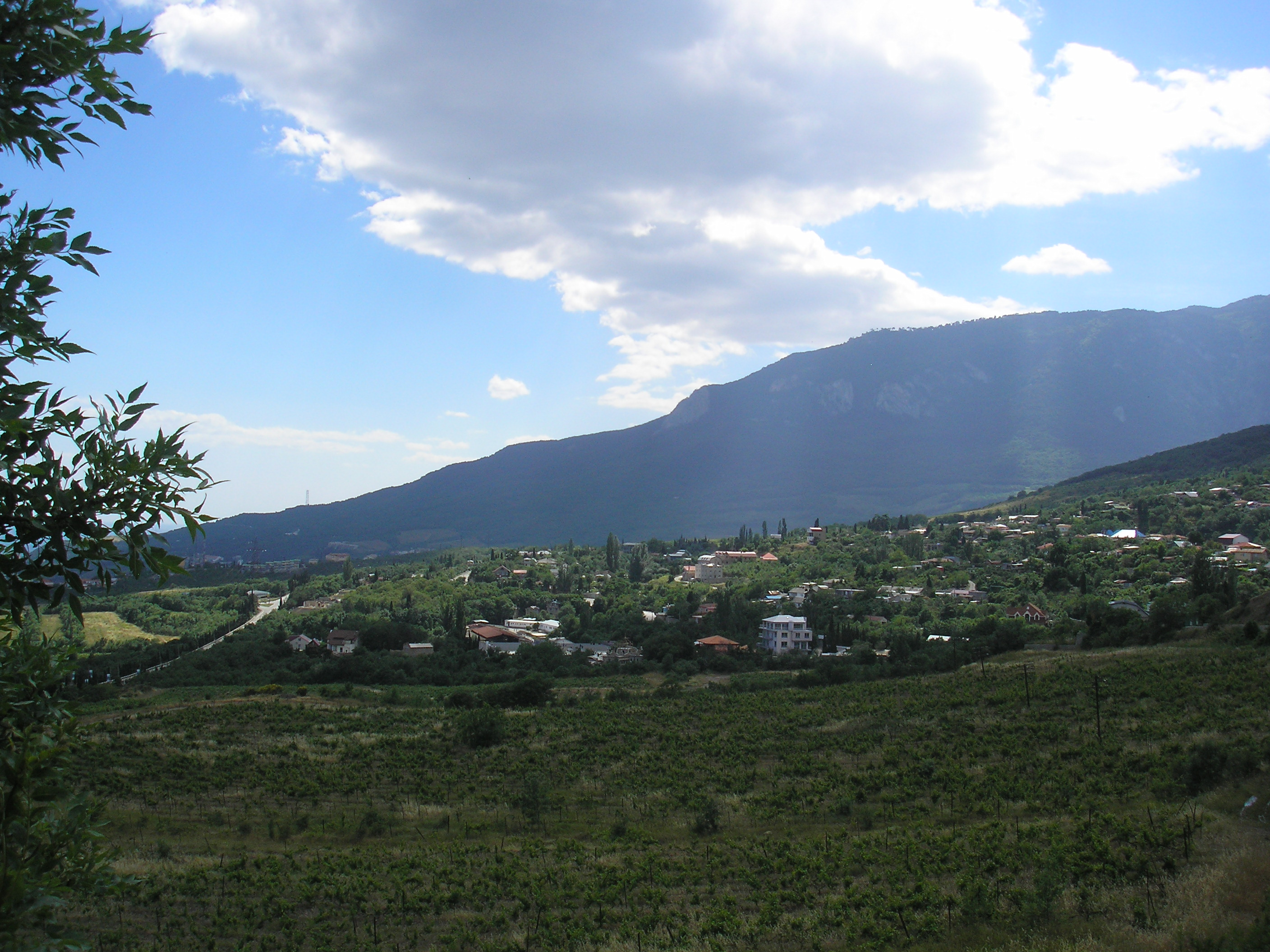

- Location of Krasnokamianka within Crimea
- Coordinates: 44°33′50″N 34°17′20″E
- Republic: Crimea
- Municipality: Yalta Municipality
- Local council: Gurzuf
- Elevation: 30 m (98 ft)

Population (2014)
  - Total: 1,051
- Time zone: UTC+4 (MSK)
- Postal code: 98646
- Former names: Kiziltash, Kyzyltash

Krasnokamianka (Ukrainian: Краснокам'янка; Russian: Краснокаменка, Crimean Tatar: Qızıltaş, also known as Kiziltash or Kyzyltash, the same word in Turkic dialects; literally, red stone) is a resort and urban-type settlement in Yalta Municipality in the Autonomous Republic of Crimea, a territory recognized by a majority of countries as part of Ukraine and incorporated by Russia as the Republic of Crimea. Population: 1,051 (2014 Census).

== Geography ==
Krasnokamianka is a former Crimean Tatar village, now a part of Greater Yalta, on the northern coast of the Black Sea.

It is near the headquarters of the Eurasian Scout Region, the divisional office of the World Scout Bureau of the World Organization of the Scout Movement in Gurzuf.
