= Cevdet Dermenci =

Soviet Crimean Tatar battalion commander

- Born: 27 August 1918; Kikeneiz, Crimean Regional Government (now Crimea)
- Died: 12 March 1985 (aged 66); Orenburg, Orenburg Oblast, Russian SFSR, Soviet Union (now Russian Federation)
- Military career
- Allegiance: Soviet Union
- Branch: Red Army
- Rank: Captain
- Nickname: Grigory Ivanovich
- Awards: Order of Lenin

Cevdet Dermenci (Russian: Джевдет Умерович Дерменджи, romanized: Dzhevdet Umerovich Dermendzhi; 27 August 1918 – 1985) was a decorated Crimean Tatar captain and battalion commander in the Red Army. For his bravery in being the first to lead his landing group across the Dnieper during his second crossing of the river he was nominated for the title Hero of the Soviet Union, but awarded only the Order of Lenin.

== Military career ==
Shortly after Nazi Germany invaded of the Soviet Union in Operation Barbarossa, Dermenci was drafted into the Red Army on 3 July by the Simferopol military enlistment office. Having been admitted to the Communist Party that year, he was briefly assigned to the 1180th Infantry Regiment before being appointed deputy commander for political affairs of a submachine gunner company on 5 November 1942. Throughout that year he was wounded in combat three times, and on 26 December 1942 he was nominated for his first military award - the Order of the Red Banner, which was awarded in 1943. Later, for his bravery in leading the unit under his command - the 112th separate anti-tank destroyer battalion - in crossing of the Dnieper he was nominated for the Order of Suvorov, which was changed to the Order of Alexander Nevsky.

For his actions on 26 September 1943 when he led a his battalion in crossing the river a second time, he was nominated for the title of Hero of the Soviet Union on 31 October 1943; despite facing a barrage of enemy artillery, machine-gun fire, and mortars, he led his battalion in being the first from the landing group to make it across to the right bank of the river. There, Dermenci led the unit in storming enemy trenches via throwing grenades and engaging in close-quarters combat, forcing the axis forces to retreat and allowing the landing group to establish a bridgehead in the area. For four days they fended off repeated counterattacks from enemy tanks and infantry, making it possible for additional friendly troops to cross the river and establish themselves in the area. Despite being wounded in the battle, he continued to command his battalion to fulfill the mission. For his actions in that battle he was nominated for the title Hero of the Soviet Union along with 28 other members of the Red Army who distinguished themselves in battle, but of the 29 people on the list he was the only person not awarded the title; he received only the Order of Lenin instead on 22 February 1944. After the victorious battle for the Dnieper he became acting commander of the 3rd Rifle Battalion of the 1120th Rifle Regiment, where he was praised for his effectiveness and leadership during the liberation of South Bessarabia. Throughout the war he took part in the battles for several major cities including Stalingrad and Odessa and was wounded at least five times.

== Postwar ==
After the war he lived in exile from Crimea in Orenburg, where he became an agronomist and director of a state farm. Later he headed a department of the regional executive committee in addition to defending his thesis for his candidate of sciences degree. He died in Orenburg in 1985 before the full right of return. Despite asking why, he never received an official explanation for why his Hero of the Soviet Union nomination was declined.

== Awards ==
- Order of Lenin (22 February 1944)
- Two Order of the Red Banner (13 March 1943 and 31 October 1943)
- Order of Alexander Nevsky (15 October 1943)
- Order of the Patriotic War 1st class (14 September 1944)
- campaign and jubilee medals
