= Samarkand State University =

Coordinates: 39.6448°N 66.9610°E

Samarkand State University (SamSU) Samarqand Davlat Universiteti (SamDU) Самаркандский государственный университет имени Шарофа Рашидова (СамГУ)
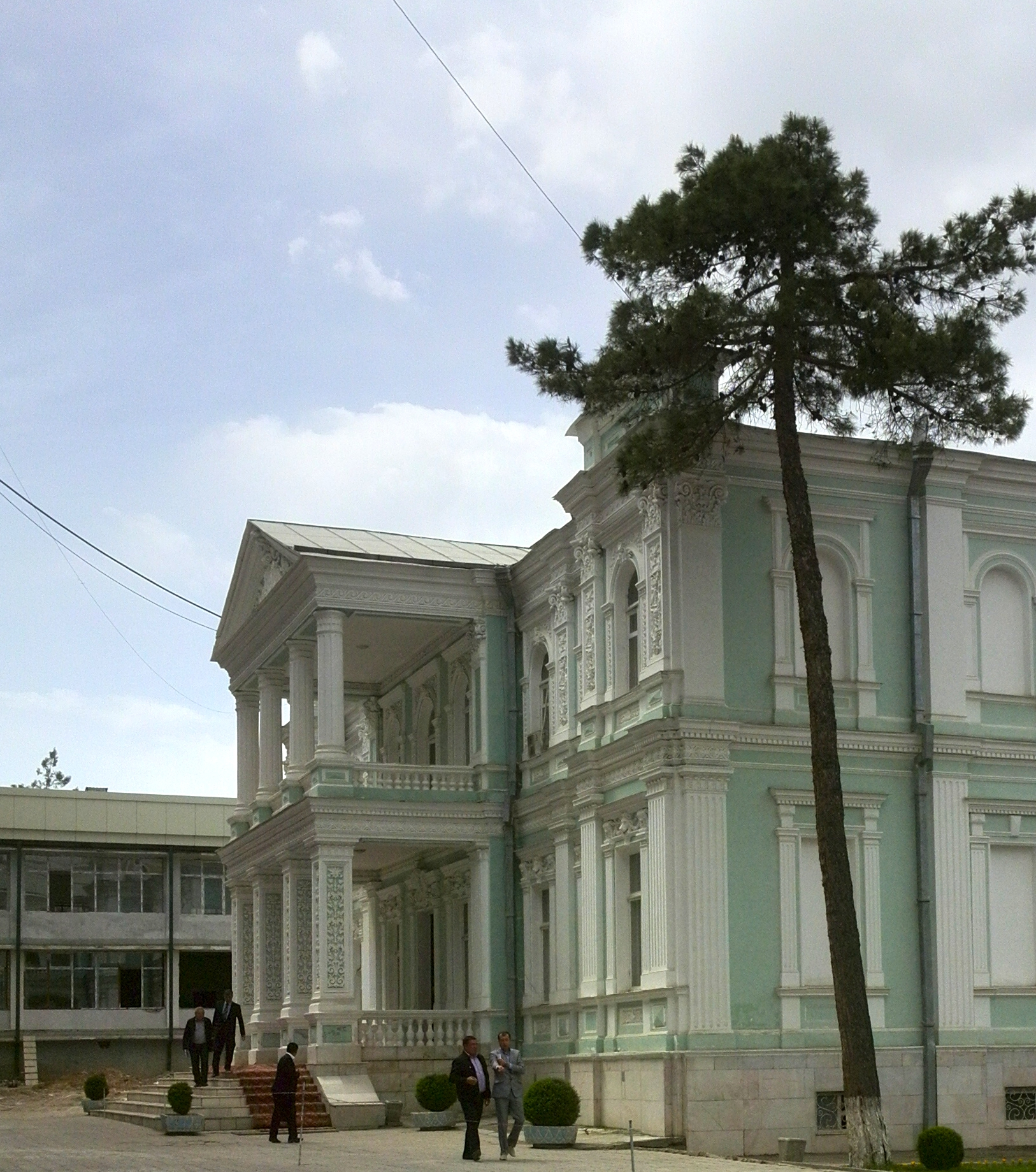
- Type: Public
- Established: 1927
- President: R. I. Xalmuradov
- Location: Samarkand, Uzbekistan
- Campus: Republic of Uzbekistan, 703004, Samarkand, University Boulevard, 15.
- Website: www.samdu.uz

University rankings

Global – Overall
- QS World: 1001-1200 (2026)

Regional – Overall
- QS Asia: 307 (2026)

Samarkand State University (SamSU) (Uzbek: Sharof Rashidov nomidagi Samarqand Davlat Universiteti (SamDU); Russian: Самаркандский государственный университет имени Шарофа Рашидова) is a public university in Samarkand, Uzbekistan established by a government decree of the Government of Uzbekistan on 10 November 2000 in the city of Samarkand. The university is commonly known as Samarkand University (in Uzbek Samarqand Universiteti).

== History ==
The university was originally organized in 1927 as the Uzbek Pedagogical Institute and in 1930, it was renamed the Uzbek State Pedagogical Academy and in 1933, upon merger of the Pedagogical Academy and the Uzbek State Medical Institute into the Uzbek State University. In 1941—2016, the University was named after poet and philosopher Ali-Shir Nava'i.

In 1961, the Uzbek State University was finally renamed the Samarkand State University, a name it keeps to date. The rector of the university since 2015 is Dr. Alimdjan Rakhimovich Khalmukhamedov.

Currently, the University comprises the following faculties:

- Philology;
- History and Philosophy;
- Teaching;
- Physics and Mathematics;
- Biology;
- Economy;
- Tajik Philology;
- Russian Philology;
- Law;
- Physical education.

== See also ==
- List of universities in Uzbekistan
- Zoological Museum of Samarkand State University
