= Abdraim Reshidov =

Crimean Tatar aviator and civil rights activist

Abdraim Izmailovich Reshidov
- Crimean Tatar: Abduraim İsmail oğlu Reşidov; Russian: Абдраим Измайлович Решидов
- Born: 8 March 1912; Mamashay, Taurida Governorate, Russian Empire
- Died: 24 October 1984 (aged 72); Simferopol, Ukrainian SSR, Soviet Union
- Military career
- Allegiance: Soviet Union
- Branch: Soviet Air Force
- Rank: Lieutenant colonel
- Nickname: "Firebird"
- Units: 5th High Speed Bomber Aviation Regiment; 15th Separate Reconnaissance Aviation Regiment; 162nd Guards Bomber Aviation Regiment
- Conflicts: World War II
- Awards: Hero of the Soviet Union

Abdraim Izmailovich Reshidov (Crimean Tatar: Abduraim İsmail oğlu Reşidov, Russian: Абдраим Измайлович Решидов; 8 March 1912 – 24 October 1984) was the deputy commander of the 162nd Guards Bomber Aviation Regiment of the Soviet Air Forces during World War II, known as the Great Patriotic War in the USSR. In 1945 while he held the rank of major he was declared a Hero of the Soviet Union for his first 166 missions in a Pe-2 during the war. After the war he was heavily involved in the Crimean Tatar civil rights movement, and swore to the government that he would publicly commit self-immolation if they did not let him live in Crimea.

== Early life ==
Reshidov was born on 8 March 1912 to a Crimean Tatar family in the village of Mamashay, Crimea. After completing only five grades of school he began working at the workshops of Kachin Military Aviation School. In 1932 he graduated from the Simferopol Osoaviahim flight school, and in 1933 he entered the Red Army, after which he continued his studies at the Lugansk Military Aviation School before goring on to graduate from the Odessa Military Aviation School in December 1934. After completing flight school he was assigned as a pilot to the 10th Reconnaissance Squadron of the Kharkov Military District. From May 1938 to April 1940 he served as a pilot in Sevastopol before transferring to the 5th High Speed Bomber Regiment in Odessa, in which he was stationed when Nazi Germany launched Operation Barbarossa.

== World War II ==
Shortly after the launch of the German invasion of the Soviet Union, Reshidov began flying defensive sorties on the Southern Front. In March 1942 his regiment was honored with the Guards designation and renamed the 8th Guards Bomber Aviation Regiment. He fought on the Southern, North Caucasian, and Transcaucasian fronts.

From March 1942 to June 1943 Reshidov studied at the Red Army Air Force Academy for commanders and chiefs of staff of aviation regiments, and went on to briefly serve in the 15th Separate Reconnaissance Aviation Reserve Regiment. He returned to the warfront in October as a squadron commander in the 854th Bomber Aviation Regiment. The regiment flew missions as part of the 2nd Ukrainian Front and fought in the Battle of the Dnieper, and in February 1944 the regiment received the Guards designation, becoming the 162nd Guards Bomber Aviation Regiment. In October 1944 he was appointed as the deputy commander of his regiment and as a flight instructor. By February 1945 he had completed 166 sorties, and received his third nomination to become a Hero of the Soviet Union. On 27 June 1945 while he held the rank of Major he was declared a Hero of the Soviet Union. By the end of the war he totaled 191 sorties and collected eight shared kills of enemy fighters.

== Later life ==
Stationed in Czechoslovakia when the war ended, he held various posts in the air force, getting stationed in Stavropol, in Chernivtsi, and Nalchik before he retired from the military with the rank of Lieutenant Colonel in 1958. Despite his prolonged service in the military he was not immediately permitted to return to his homeland of Crimea and spent many years in exile in Nalchik. While in Nalchik he worked as the head of the logistics department of the local department of transport. Shortly after seeing the strangely-worded decree "on citizens of Tatar nationality who formerly lived in Crimea" published in September 1967 that confused many Crimean Tatars into thinking they were allowed right of return, he soon returned to Crimea, arriving in October, and attempted to obtain a residence permit. However, unlike when he had moved to other cities, he was not given a residence permit, only given vague responses telling him to ask for one next year. Having brought his wife and daughter all the way from Nalchik thinking they would be allowed to live in Crimea, he became desperate and enraged, so on 4 November 1967 he sent a telegram to Chief Air Marshal Konstantin Vershinin, swearing that he would end his life by self immolation in Lenin square if he could not live in Crimea. Not backing down, he filled up two bottles of gasoline for such purpose shortly before officials came to him with a residence permit, allowing him to live in Simferopol. The incident was monitored by the KGB, which constantly surveilled him and produced various internal reports decrying his “provocative” behavior. Meanwhile, Reshidov became more active in the Crimean Tatar civil rights movement, and was the standard bearer at the funeral of Amet-khan Sultan and gave a speech about him. As a signer of various petitions demanding rehabilitation and right of return and having hosted meetings in his apartment with other Crimean Tatars, the KGB kept a close eye on him, and even demanded that he keep the celebrations of his 60th birthday to a minimum, which the KGB perceived as a potentially “provocative” and “nationalist” event. Reshidov died in Simferopol on 24 October 1984. Soviet authorities wanted him to be buried quietly in an ordinary cemetery, but his family was appalled by the notion that he not be given a military hero’s funeral, and in the end, he was buried with full honors.

His father died during the deportation in 1944.

== Awards and honors ==
- Hero of the Soviet Union (27 June 1945)
- Two Orders of Lenin (23 February 1942 and 27 June 1945)
- Three Orders of the Red Banner (23 February 1942, 15 May 1945, and 3 November 1953)
- Order of Aleksandr Nevsky (21 September 1944)
- Order of the Red Star (20 June 1949)
- Medal "For Battle Merit" (3 November 1944)
- Czechoslovak War Cross (1945)
- campaign and jubilee medals
