= Squatting in Crimea =

1991–present civil conflict in Crimea

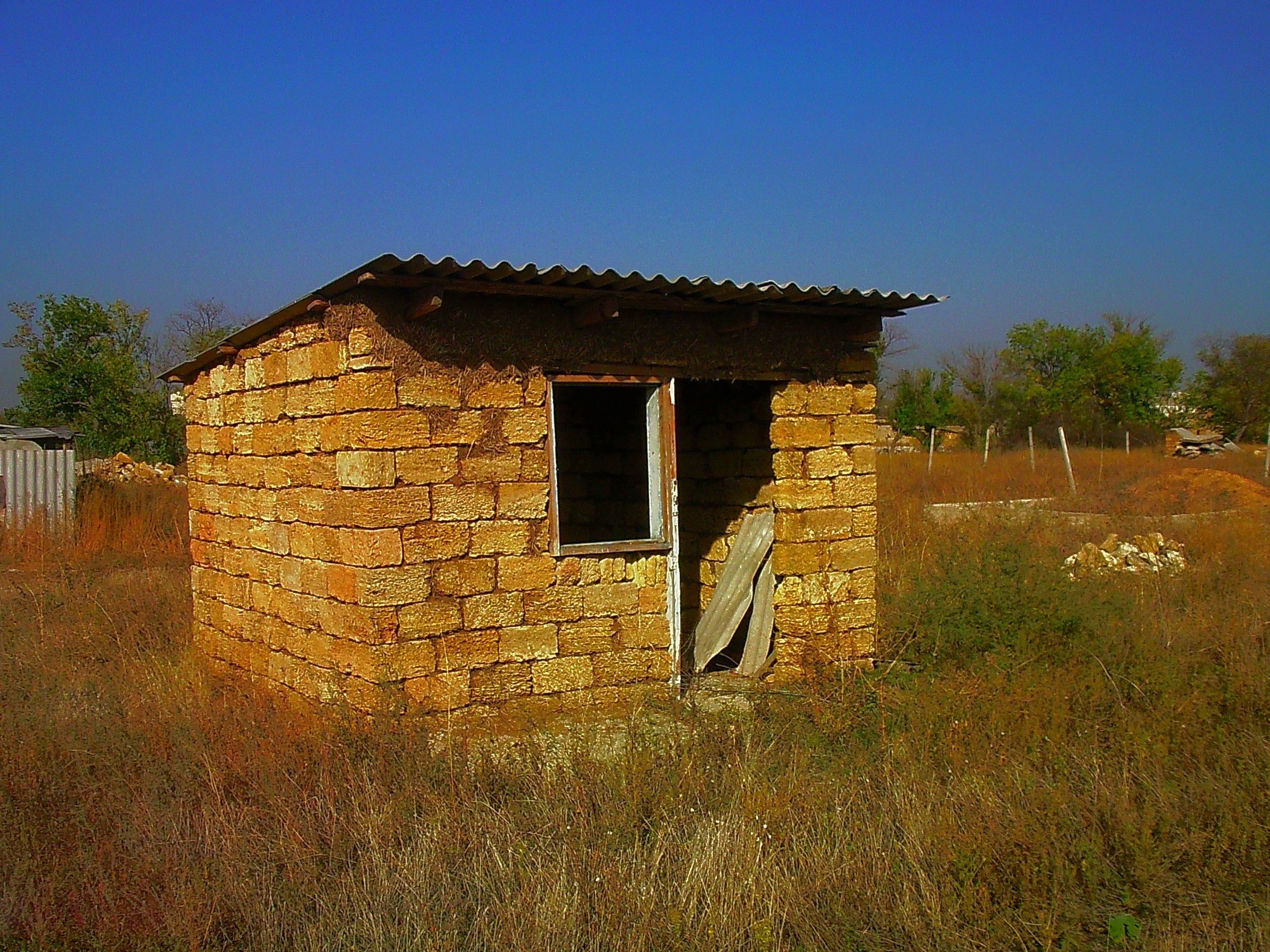
- A squatter's dwelling outside Simferopol
- Date: Total: 11 July 1989 – present (36 years, 11 months and 14 days); First major phase: 11 July 1989 – 6 October 1992 (3 years, 2 months and 25 days); Second phase: 28 March 2006 – present (20 years, 2 months and 28 days)
- Location: Crimea
- Caused by: Deportation of the Crimean Tatars; Soviet, Ukrainian, and Russian failure to support Crimean Tatar repatriation; Slavic settlement in Crimea
- Methods: Squatting
- Status: Ongoing
- Result: Ongoing

Parties
Squatters; (Crimean Tatars) Mejlis of the Crimean Tatar People	Soviet Union (1989–1991); (Ukraine) Autonomous Republic of Crimea (1991–present); (Russia) Republic of Crimea (2014–present); Supported by: NDKT (1989–1993)	(Autonomous Republic of Crimea) Republic of Crimea (1992–1995); (Russia) Russian nationalists; Slavic settlers in Crimea; Cossacks; Ministry of Internal Affairs (Crimea)

Squatting in Crimea (Ukrainian: Самозахват, lit. 'Self-occupation' or 'squatting') refers to the illegal occupation of land in Crimea; in the Ukrainian media, squatting is primarily discussed in regards to Crimean Tatar returnees, though most squatters are Slavs. The process, which began in the late 1980s following exiled Crimean Tatars being granted the right to return to the Crimean peninsula, has been caused by the inability of the Ukrainian and Russian governments to efficiently give land grants to Crimean Tatars. As a result of the slow process, many Crimean Tatars have turned to erecting impromptu structures on undeveloped land.

Squatting is a controversial issue in Crimea. It has led to violence by Russian nationalists against Crimean Tatars and has been used as justification for anti-Crimean Tatar positions. Since the Annexation of Crimea by the Russian Federation, the Russian government has claimed to have solved the issue, though squatting remains a significant issue.

== Background and early squatting ==
In 1944, the entire Crimean Tatar population was deported from the Crimean Peninsula and sent into exile in Central Asia, primarily Uzbekistan. During their exile, the Crimean peninsula was colonised by Russian and Ukrainian settlers.

When the return of the Crimean Tatars began in 1989, there was no real support for such an undertaking from the Soviet government. A proposed government programme to organise and facilitate the return of Crimean Tatars never came to fruition due to the collapse of the Soviet Union. There was no housing supplied nor available to the returnees. The problem of housing led to a split between two groups; on one hand was the NDKT, led by Yuri Osmanov, called for patience and support for Soviet measures. Running counter to the NDKT was the OKND, led by Dzhemilev, which criticised the slow pace of government repatriation and called for returnees to resettle land on their own initiative. Dzhemilev said of Soviet repatriation efforts, "The USSR was able to evict the entire people in one night, and is it going to return them in 20 years?"

The development of a government repatriation programme seemed positive for the NDKT. However, this repatriation programme soon revealed itself to be hollow; the areas of the peninsula historically most inhabited by Crimean Tatars, including major cities and the Southern Coast, were declared off-limits to returnees. Government officials threatened those seeking to sell their homes to Crimean Tatars with deportation from Crimea. In spite of this opposition, a tent camp was established on the Southern Coast in the village of Zaprudne (Crimean Tatar: Degirmenköy) in autumn 1989. Despite early cooperation with the Soviet government, things soon turned sour; on 14 December 1989, the encampment was stormed by the militsiya, soldiers, and local settlers, who attacked the Crimean Tatars. Six of the victims were imprisoned for four months on charges of hooliganism before being released in the face of widespread outcry. The organiser of the tent camp, Ulviye Ablayeva, was declared to be at large.

In the final months of the Soviet Union, the Crimean Autonomous Soviet Socialist Republic was re-established as a territorial autonomous entity. In contrast to the previous Crimean ASSR, which had been a national and territorial autonomy with the intention of protecting Crimean Tatars, the new Crimean ASSR was purely territorial, therefore entrusting power in the hands of Russians. The response by Crimean Tatars was fierce, and, at the Second Qurultay of the Crimean Tatar People, Declaration of national sovereignty of the Crimean Tatar people was adopted, saying that the Crimean Tatar people have a right to the land and natural resources of Crimea, and that any political decisions should be made with the consent of the Crimean Tatars. The dissolution of the Soviet Union brought an end to the half-hearted repatriation efforts, though a replacement never came; the new Ukrainian government failed to establish a resettlement plan, and numbers of Crimean Tatar returnees rose to 30,000–50,000 after the Soviet Union dissolved.

== Squatting under Ukraine (1991–2014) ==
With no existing infrastructure to facilitate the repatriation or housing of Crimean Tatars, early returnees found themselves in destitute living conditions. Many lived in hostels or trailers. In one instance, the campus of Tavrida National V.I. Vernadsky University was occupied by repatriated families. Waiting for government involvement became an impossibility due to a combination of hyperinflation and the sheer number of people in waiting lists for housing, and squatting became the only real option. As privatisation of once-collectivised land began, Crimean Tatar activists negotiated with local authorities in an effort to gain control of uninhabited land. But these efforts were for naught, as land was sold to ethnic Russians who had worked on former kolkhozes. Matters were further troubled by ethnic Russian separatism in Crimea. In an effort to defuse tensions and prevent the establishment of a pro-Russian state in Crimea, President Leonid Kravchuk granted several concessions to the separatist Republic of Crimea. As a result, Crimean Tatars continued to be marginalised.

=== 1992 clashes ===
In mid-1992, frustrated by the slow pace of housing in the city of Alushta, an impromptu village was established in Alushta Municipality, near the village of Krasny Ray. Soon after its establishment, the village was attacked by state farm workers with the support of the Crimean authorities, leading to 17 being severely injured. Undeterred, the Crimean Tatars re-established their encampment, only to be confronted once again in August. This time, the Crimean government left no doubts about its involvement, sending in special forces to support the farmers. The authorities agreed to negotiations after being confronted by Crimean Tatars who threatened self-immolation if their demands were not met. However, no results came from the negotiations, and on 1 October 1992, the encampment was attacked once again, this time by special forces. The inhabitants of the camp were beaten, attacked with gas, and sprayed with fire hoses as their homes were bulldozed. 20 were seriously injured, suffering from burns, internal organ damage, or having their eyes gouged out. 26 additional Crimean Tatars were abducted by the special forces and forcibly disappeared.

As a result of the storming of the village, 10,000 Crimean Tatars marched on the city of Simferopol, Crimea's capital, on 6 October 1992 and met near the Verkhovna Rada of Crimea. There, Dzhemilev revealed six demands towards the Crimean authorities which had been adopted by the Mejlis of the Crimean Tatar People the same day:

1. To release the 26 disappeared Crimean Tatars
2. To initiate criminal proceedings against the organisers of the clashes, among them Mykola Bahrov, head of the Verkhovna Rada of Crimea
3. Complete material compensation for damages caused by the destruction of the village
4. That the Verkhovna Rada of Ukraine, the Verkhovna Rada of Crimea, the government of the Republic of Crimea, and the Mejlis of the Crimean Tatar People together consider proposed reforms by the Mejlis
5. To end discrimination against Crimean Tatars in repatriation
6. To involve Crimean Tatars in the repatriation process

After Dzhemilev announced the six demands, the 10,000 stormed the Verkhovna Rada of Crimea, fighting with special forces and militsiya who guarded the premises. That night, negotiations were conducted between the Crimean authorities and the Mejlis, upon which the 26 disappeared Crimean Tatars were released.

After the 1992 clashes, several changes were made to ensure the reintegration of Crimean Tatars into Ukrainian society. The Constitution of Ukraine, adopted in 1996, recognised Crimean Tatars as an indigenous people of Crimea, while electoral reforms allocated 14 seats in the Verkhovna Rada of Crimea to the Crimean Tatars. At the same time as these reforms, however, the government took a stand against squatting, including introducing criminal liability. Following the 1992 clashes, repatriation to Crimea ebbed, and though squatting continued by Crimean Tatars, they were gradually outpaced by Slavs living in Crimea. By April 2006, there were 658 squatting sites settled by Slavs compared to 237 by Crimean Tatars.

=== 2006–2014 ===
Two days following the 2006 Crimean parliamentary election, Crimean Tatars once again began returning to Crimea in significant numbers. This time, the settlements doubled as a form of protest. By 5 April 2006, six tent villages had been established in and around Simferopol. The largest of the encampments was established at a former artillery depot owned by the Ministry of Defence, and Dzhemilev requested negotiations with Viktor Shevchenko, head of the Crimean militsiya, and Anatoliy Hrytsenko, Minister of Defence, for the transfer of the site to Crimean Tatars. On 1 November 2007, Crimean Tatar squatters and representatives of the Olvy-Krym corporation clashed violently in Simferopol. Five days later, Anatolii Mohyliov ordered the destruction of an illegal village on Ay Petri yayla. After the destruction of the village, Dzhemilev called for Mohyliov's resignation.

Under the presidency of Viktor Yushchenko, further attention was paid to Crimean Tatar land issues. Dzhemilev claimed in 2010 that over a dozen commissions were established to investigate problems regarding squatting over the course of the previous six to seven years, but that they failed to reach a resolution due to the fact that "very interesting names of the highest echelons of power in both Crimea and Kyiv were revealed." At this time, Dzhemilev also claimed that Crimean Tatars were being used as a scapegoat for those illegally settling inhabited areas, stating that Crimean Tatars primarily squatted on unowned lands while Ukrainian oligarchs illegally took control of land.

Following Yushchenko's presidency, the pro-Russian Viktor Yanukovych became President of Ukraine. Yanukovych, who had fought for more stringent fines and prison time against squatters as Prime Minister, centred his concerns on Crimean Tatars for squatting in a 2010 speech. Yanukovych repeated his opposition to squatting in 2013. However, despite these statements, Yanukovych and his associates illegally participated in squatting. One of the most significant cases was the "Second Mezhyhirya", to be constructed at the southern Sarych cape in Crimea.

== Squatting under Russia (2014–present) ==
Since the annexation of Crimea by the Russian Federation, the Russian government has variously promised to alleviate Crimean Tatars' housing conditions and claimed to have resolved the issue. Ruslan Balbek said in 2014 that the register of those wishing to receive land would be updated, while President of Crimea Sergey Aksyonov has claimed that everyone wishing to receive land could receive it. In February 2022, the government of the Republic of Crimea claimed that 180 housing units (108 in Yevpatoria and 72 in Saky Municipality) would soon be completed for distribution to the "rehabilitated peoples" of Crimea (also including Greeks, Bulgarians, Germans, and Armenians) by May.
