= Crimean Tatar repatriation =

Return of Tatars to Crimea, 1980s–1990s

The main wave of Crimean Tatar repatriation occurred in the late 1980s and early 1990s when over 200,000 Crimean Tatars left Central Asia to return to Crimea whence they had been deported in 1944. While the Soviet government attempted to stifle mass return efforts for decades by denying them residence permits in Crimea or even recognition as a distinct ethnic group, activists continued to petition for the right of return. Eventually a series of commissions were created to publicly evaluate the prospects of allowing return, the first being the notorious Gromyko commission that lasted from 1987 to 1988 that issued declaring that "there was no basis" to allow exiled Crimean Tatars to return en masse to Crimea or restore the Crimean ASSR.

However, the government soon reconsidered its decision in light of the June 1989 pogroms against minorities in the Fergana valley where Crimean Tatars were exiled to, resulting in the formation of the Yanayev commission to readdress the possibility of allowing Crimean Tatars to return to Crimea. As result, on 14 November 1989, the Supreme Soviet issued a statement unequivocally condemning the deportation and exile of Crimean Tatars, re-recognizing them as a distinct ethnic group, and calling for the implementation of a state-sponsored repatriation of exiled Crimean Tatars to Crimea. Subsequently a commission led by Vitaly Doguzhiyev was formed to develop plans to carry out the repatriation and assist Crimean Tatars in returning to Crimea.

However, many of the state-sponsored return efforts did not last long due to the subsequent dissolution of the Soviet Union, and when the Crimean ASSR was re-established in 1991 it was designed as a regional autonomy, not as the de facto Crimean Tatar titular republic of the original Crimean ASSR. What followed was the mass return of a large portion of the Crimean Tatar diaspora in Central Asia, with an estimated 166,000 making it to Crimea by the end of 1991. Eventually over 200,000 Crimean Tatars returned, but many struggled to get suitable housing and citizenship in newly independent Ukraine for several years and to this day remain poorly integrated in Russian-dominated Crimean society. Today they compose an estimated 12% of the population of Crimea, living mostly in the central parts of the peninsula with negligible representation in the southern coastal regions where they were a majority before the deportation, which are currently very expensive to live in.

== Background ==
Ever since the deportation of 1944, Crimean Tatar exiles sought to return to their homeland. However, while most deported peoples, including the Chechens, Ingush, Kalmyks, were all allowed to return to their homelands, had their titular national republics restored, and were recognized as distinct ethnic groups. However, the same 1956 decree that restored the rights and republics of those deported peoples delimited Crimean Tatars, failing to recognize that they never part of the Volga Tatar people, and rationalized that the Crimean ASSR didn't need to be restored since the Tatar ASSR already existed, suggesting that "people of Tatar nationality formerly living in the Crimea" "return" to Tatarstan. Although Crimean Tatar rights activists attempted to explain to the Kremlin that they were a distinct ethnic group and not part of the Volga Tatar people colloquially simply called "Tatars", and only wanted to return to Crimea, they remained unrecognized, continuing to be counted simply as "Tatars" in censuses, and their repeated petitions requesting right of return to Crimea and restoration of the Crimean ASSR were rejected.

Eventually in September 1967 a carefully worded decree proclaiming that "Citizens of Tatar nationality previously living in the Crimea" were officially rehabilitated, leading to confusion among many Crimean Tatars about their status, but the subsequent fine print declared that they were "firmly rooted" in "places of residence" and reinforced that they could move about "in accordance with the passport regime". The initial vagueness of the announcements resulted in the first wave of Crimean Tatar returnees arriving in Crimea. While some of them were granted the required propiska (residence permit) to live in Crimea legally, many others were turned away and re-deported to Central Asia. The "lottery for the homeland" died off, with the number of Crimean Tatar families permitted to return to Crimea each year turning into a trickle by the 70's. Nevertheless, numerous Crimean Tatar families continued to seek repatriation to Crimea, only for most of them to be re-deported to Central Asia after being denied the required residence permit. Meanwhile, slavic settlers in Crimea from the mainland Ukraine and the RSFSR continued to flow into Crimea, and faced no barriers to obtaining housing and the required residence permit.

== Soviet reconsideration ==
=== Gromyko commission ===
After decades of petitioning and delegations in 1987 Crimean Tatar activists organized a protest in the centre of Moscow near the Kremlin, which led the Soviet government to form a commission to evaluate the possibility of allowing Crimean Tatars to return to Crimea. The ensuing commission led by the hardliner Andrei Gromyko, who did not hide his disdain for Crimean Tatars and was reluctant to even meet with them, contained no Crimean Tatars on the board, and in July 1988 a formal conclusion statement was issued saying that there was "no basis" to allow mass repatriation of Crimean Tatars to Crimea and or the restoration of the Crimean ASSR on practical grounds due to the sharp demographic changes in Crimea over the decades, reaffirming the status quo of only seldom allowing small numbers of Crimean Tatars into Crimea on an individual basis.

=== Fergana pogroms ===
In June 1989, Uzbek nationalist mobs attacked en masse the Meskhetian Turk minority (another ethnic group exiled in the Uzbek SSR) and other minorities to a lesser extent, including the Crimean Tatars. Earlier in December 1988 there had been a rally in Tashkent where Uzbek nationalists held banners saying "Russians - go to Russia! Crimean Tatars - go to Crimea!" Anecdotal evidence suggests that while approximately three-fourths of Crimean Tatars wanted to return to Crimea before the pogroms, almost all Crimean Tatars wanted to leave the Uzbek SSR afterwards, as they felt that the writing was on the wall that they would be the next target and the authorities would not be able to protect them when targeted by Uzbek mobs, just like they were unable to protect the Meskhetian Turks. In addition, the blatant violence against minorities in the riots limited the government's ability to claim Crimean Tatars and other exiled minorities had "taken root" in the Uzbek SSR or had no reason to want to leave.

=== Yanayev commission ===
After the Gromyko commission and the Fergana pogroms, the government decided to officially reconsider the possibility of allowing Crimean Tatars to return to Crimea. The Commission on the Problems of the Crimean Tatars headed by Gennady Yanayev was formed on 12 July 1989. Just like in the previous commission, members of the commission travelled across the Soviet Union to speak with Crimean Tatar diaspora communities in Central Asia as well as the leadership of Crimea and the Central Asia republics, as well as activists from across the spectrum of the Crimean Tatar rights movement ranging from the NDKT to the OKND. The conclusions, issued on 28 November 1989, cleared the way for the rehabilitation of the Crimean Tatar people and supported allowing their return to Crimea.

Although it acknowledged that mass return would not be easy due to the demographics of Crimea at the time, which the Gromyko commission used as a reason to reject the right of return, it noted that such excuses were an unacceptable grounds to deny justice to the Crimean Tatar people, who long lived in hope of seeing Crimea again. In addition, it pointed out and condemned the hypocrisy of the continued recruitment of people from other parts of the union to work and live in Crimea while denying Crimean Tatars the same opportunity to do so, and acknowledged that the Crimean Tatars were widely discriminated against when attempting to get residence permits in Crimea, and called for the abolition of decrees specifically intended to limit their ability to return. Subsequently, another commission, led by Vitaly Doguzhiyev and composed of various Soviet politicians in addition to five Crimean Tatars (Refat Appazov, Refat Chubarov, Ferit Ziyadinov, Akhtem Tippa, and Riza Asanov) was formed to develop proposals for the implementation of the planned return.

== Return process ==
In 1989, the ban on the return of the deported ethnicities was officially declared null and void; the Supreme Council of Crimea also issued a declaration on 14 November 1989 that the previous deportations of peoples were a criminal act. In 1989 Mustafa Dzhemilev, the chairman of the newly founded Crimean Tatar National Movement returned to Crimea.

Some Crimean Tatars, led by Dzhemilev, in the early 1990s were calling for a two-chamber parliament for Crimea, with one chamber limited to Crimean Tatars with a veto over legislation.

The 1991 Russian law On the Rehabilitation of Repressed Peoples addressed the rehabilitation of all ethnicities repressed in the Soviet Union. It adopted measures which involved the "abolition of all previous RSFSR laws relating to illegally forced deportations" and called for the "restoration and return of the cultural and spiritual values and archives which represent the heritage of the repressed people."

By the 2001 census Crimean Tatars formed 12 per cent of the population of Crimea.

== Results ==
=== Reactions from Russian residents ===
The Russian population of Crimea, who formed the majority demographic of the peninsula, were often very hostile to returning Crimean Tatars, whose return was perceived as an invading enemy. Organizers encouraged fellow Russians in Crimea to buy up land plots as soon as possible and ask their Russian relatives outside Crimea to help buy more to prevent it from being bought by Crimean Tatars. With the complicity of Crimean authorities, Crimean Tatars continued to be presented with bureaucratic obstacles to buying land and housing in Crimea, while state land that was earmarked for redistribution to Crimean Tatar returnees to build housing on ended up being given to the slavic population in Crimea for gardens and dachas.

At the start of the return in 1989 various Russian nationalists staged protests in Crimea under the slogan "Tatar traitors—Get out of Crimea!" Several clashes between locals and Crimean Tatars were reported in 1990 near Yalta, which resulted in the army to intervening.

=== Government actions ===
After the dissolution of the USSR, Crimea found itself a part of Ukraine, but Kyiv gave only limited support to Crimean Tatar settlers. Some 150,000 of the returnees were granted citizenship automatically under Ukraine's Citizenship Law of 1991, but 100,000 who returned after the country declared independence faced several obstacles, including a costly bureaucratic process. By 2000, there were 46,603 recorded appeals of returnees who demanded a piece of land. A majority of these applications were rejected.

=== Ruralization and impact on Crimean Tatar community ===
Although around two-thirds of Crimean Tatars in exile lived in urban areas of Central Asia by the 1980's, upon returning to Crimea, about the same percent were settled in the rural areas where the land was of lower value, where they built shanty towns, instead of mass resettling in the south coast where most of the Crimean Tatar population used to live. The exclusion of large swaths of the Crimean Tatar population from the economy of the South Coast further deepened the poverty of the returnees in the steppes, who often lacked basic utilities or even insulation in the hastily constructed houses. With unemployment among Crimean Tatars reaching 40% to 70% at some points, many who were well-educated ended up working in menial jobs well below their skill level; however, very few left Crimea for Central Asia, (less than 2%) and most who did leave did so only temporarily. Over time migration within Crimea moved somewhat southward towards their ancestral villages and closer to urban areas where employment opportunities were better but the cost of living higher.

Around the larger cities, such as Sevastopol, a Crimean Tatar was on average given only 0.04 acres of land, which was of poor quality or unsuitable for farming.

The repatriation program approved by the government in 1989 intended to aid the return of 50,000 exiled Crimean Tatars each year, and set targets for the number of housing units to be constructed in Crimea for returnees each year. However, the program supporting Crimean Tatar returnees did not meet its construction targets, and after Ukraine gained independence from the USSR the number of Crimean Tatars returning each year drastically declined, with Crimean Tatars largely left with no option but to claim an unused land plot in a remote area and build a house from scratch there, and until then live in tents.

The returnees found 517 abandoned Crimean Tatar villages, but bureaucracy constrained their efforts to restore them. During 1991 at least 117 Crimean Tatar families lived in tents in two meadows near Simferopol, waiting for the authorities to grant them a permanent residence.

However, some Crimean Tatars nevertheless aimed for returning to the coast: on 23 October 1989 the first temporary tent city on the south coast was established in Degirmenkoy, after repeated attempts to obtain residence permits and land through the formal process reached a dead end. However, the tent city was soon violently demolished on 14 December 1989 when over 600 policemen accompanied by over 200 vigilantes attacked the camp, who brutalized residents including the elderly; one farm director who participated in the attack would knock people over and then kick them on the ground. In the midst of the chaos, Seidamet Balji set himself on fire, attempting self-immolation, but was soon extinguished.

Nevertheless, Crimean Tatars were not intimidated by the events, and continued to return to Crimea, building villages in empty fields. By the time most Crimean Tatars started returning to Crimea, the already expensive housing prices in Crimea continued to rise while the prices of housing in Central Asia continued to decrease, resulting in very few Crimean Tatar returnees being able to buy their own houses. As a result, most returning Crimean Tatars settled in Central Crimea where the land was less costly and constructed their own shanty towns there.

=== Family separation ===
Since the exile lasted for almost 50 years, some Crimean Tatars decided to stay in Uzbekistan or were unable to travel to Crimea, which led to the separation of families who had decided to return to Crimea.
