= Yuri Osmanov =

Soviet-Crimean activist (1941–1993)

Yuri Bekirovich Osmanov
- Born: 1 April 1941; Büyük Qaralez, Bakhchysarai Raion, Crimean ASSR, RSFSR, USSR
- Died: 7 November 1993 (aged 52); Simferopol, Republic of Crimea, Ukraine
- Citizenship: Soviet Union; Ukraine
- Education: Bauman Moscow State Technical University
- Political party: NDKT
- Spouse: Ayshe Dobro

Yuri Bekirovich Osmanov (Crimean Tatar: Yuriy Bekir oğlu Osmanov, Russian: Юрий Бекирович Османов; 1 April 1941, Büyük Qaralez, Bakhchysarai district, Crimean Autonomous Soviet Socialist Republic, RSFSR, USSR — 7 November 1993, Simferopol, Republic of Crimea, Ukraine) was a scientist, engineer, Marxist–Leninist, and Crimean Tatar civil rights activist. He was one of the co-founders of the National Movement of Crimean Tatars, which sought full right of return of the Crimean Tatar people to their homeland and restoration of the Crimean ASSR.

== Early life ==
Osmanov was born on 1 April 1941 in Büyük Qaralez, Crimea. His father Bekir Osmanov was an agronomist of Crimean Tatar ethnicity who became a scout for the Soviet partisans during the German occupation of Crimea, during which Yuri was evacuated to Azerbaijan with his mother, a Belarusian. A postwar book about partisans in Crimea falsely stated that his father was a German spy who was shot, but in reality he survived the war and never sided with the Germans, and the central committee eventually acknowledged the claim was false, and ordered that later editions of the book be corrected. In 1944 the Osmanov family was deported to Ferghana in the Uzbek SSR as "special settlers" because of their Crimean Tatar background. Despite being just a small child during World War II, having been away from Crimea during the conflict, and being the son of a wounded partisan, the declaration that Crimean Tatars were traitors was applied to him and he was treated like a second-class citizen as a result. After completing secondary school in 1958 with excellent marks he applied to enter Moscow State University since his grades were high enough, but he was rejected because he was Crimean Tatar and hence officially forbidden from attending an institution outside Central Asia. However, Amet-khan Sultan put in a good word about Osmanov to academics, and he was eventually allowed to attend Bauman Moscow State Technical University. There, he graduated in 1965 with a degree in mechanical engineering. He worked at the Joint Institute for Nuclear Research and the Institute for High Energy Physics; while there he became interested in the Crimean Tatar civil rights movement, and spent his free time studying the legacy and works of Ismail Gasprinsky, the founder of the Crimean Tatar enlightenment.

== Activism ==
=== Background ===
At that time Osmanov became an activist, most deported peoples who had survived the "special settler" regime including Chechens and Kalmyks were completely allowed to return to their homeland and were not denied residence permits necessary for doing so; however, Soviet leadership did not apply the same policy for Crimean Tatars, and as a result a vast majority of Crimean Tatars were forced to remain in exile due to being unable to get a residence permits in Crimea. However, the official Soviet narrative was that the Crimean Tatars had taken root in their place of exile and had equal rights - despite not having the same rights to residence permits in their previous land of residence as other deported nations, and the claim that Crimean Tatars had "taken root" was a false; there was an overwhelming desire to return to Crimea, a theme pervasive throughout all aspects of their culture, ranging from embroidery featuring the peninsula to the mournful song Ey Guzel Qirim. Moscow's refusal to allow a return was not only based out of a desire to satisfy the new Russian settlers in Crimea, who were very hostile to the idea of a return, but for economic reasons: high productivity from Crimean Tatar industries in Central Asia meant that letting the diaspora return would take a toll on the industrialization goals of Central Asia. Historians attribute Chechen resistance to confinement in exile to Khrushchev's support of allowing them to return, while the non-violent Crimean Tatar movement did not lead to any desire from the government of the Uzbek SSR for Crimean Tatars to leave. In effect, the government was punishing Crimean Tatars for being Stakhanovites while rewarding the deported nations that contributed less to the building of socialism, creating further resentment.

=== Political activities in the Soviet Union ===
In January 1968 Osmanov faced his first arrest for distributing documents stating grievances of Crimean Tatars and demanding full rehabilitation, for which he was sentenced to two and a half years in a high-security penal labour colony at the Kyzylkum gold mine. Upon release he began working at a glass factory in Azerbaijan as an engineer before returning to Fergana in 1972; there he worked at a nitrogen fertilizer factory and later at the Giprovodkhoz Institute, all while continuing to remain politically active. One of the projects of his activism was an evaluation of the extent of the losses to the Crimean Tatar people caused by the deportation. From 1973 to 1974 he and his father worked on conducting a census of deported Crimean Tatars in Central Asia, in which they estimated that the real number of Crimean Tatars deported in 1944 was well above 200,000. The KGB insisted that the mortality rate of deported Crimean Tatars was "only" around 22% in the first few years of exile, but the Osmanov census showed a figure of around 46%, which led to him concluding that the government downplayed the death toll of Crimean Tatars. After compiling the census and evaluating the losses, he created a list of seven grievances against Soviet policy that he sent to the central government of the USSR as well as the UN. On 1 December 1982 he was arrested for distributing a series leaflets describing Crimean Tatar mistreatment in the Soviet Union, for which he was charged "defaming the Soviet system"; his samizdat works that led to his arrest included a leaflet titled "Genocide-Israeli style" that compared the treatment of Crimean Tatars by the USSR and Palestinians by Israel. Subsequently, he served three years in a high-security labor camp in Yakutia, and then three days before his scheduled release he was forcibly taken to the Blagoveshchensk psychiatric hospital, where he was detained for another two years and subject to punitive psychiatry.

While in prison, his father, one of the few who was allowed to return to Crimea, died. At the funeral, which had intense KGB surveillance, he was buried next to Musa Mamut, who had committed self-immolation in protest of being forced to leave Crimea. Yuri was released in September 1987 during perestroika and returned to activism. Earlier that year in July, a state commission was created to consider and evaluate the request for the right of return, chaired by Andrey Gromyko. Gromyko's condescending attitude and failure to assure them that they would have the right of return ended up concerning members of the Crimean Tatar civil rights movement. In June he rejected the request for re-establishment of a Crimean Tatar autonomy in Crimea and supported only small efforts for return, while agreeing to allow the lower-priority requests of having more publications and school instruction in the Crimean Tatar language at the local level among areas with the deported populations. Gromyko's eventual conclusion that "no basis to renew autonomy and grant Crimean Tatars the right to return" triggered widespread protests. Anatoly Lukyanov from the commission had pointed out that other nations deported in the war were allowed to return, and noted that the case of the Kalmyks, who were deported less than a year before the Crimean Tatars for the same official reason but allowed to return to Kalmykia in the 1950s. Kalmyk collaboration with the Germans in the war was not used as a reason to treat Kalmyk civilians as second-class citizens in the 1980s, since by then they had become effectively rehabilitated, while the treatment of Crimean Tatars as second-class citizens at the time was often justified by reiterating the same official talking points about their alleged actions in World War II. Less than two years after Gromyko's commission had rejected their request for autonomy and return, pogroms against the exiled Meskhetian Turks were taking place in Central Asia. During the pogroms, some Crimean Tatars were targeted as well, but Osmanov played an active role in de-escalating the conflict and protecting local Crimean Tatar communities from attackers. After the pogroms, it became clear to the leadership of the USSR that Crimean Tatars and Meskhetian Turks had not fully assimilated into Central Asia as intended, and a second commission led by Gennady Yanaev was established to reconsider Crimean Tatar demands in June 1989. In November the military adopted the resolution "On the Recognition of the Repressive Acts Against Peoples Subjected to Forced Displacement and Ensuring their Rights", which was based on the draft "Declaration on the Crime and Wrongfulness of State Acts Against Peoples Victimized by Deportation." On 14 December 1989 the Supreme Soviet declared the deportation to have been illegal, and in 1990 Osmanov was appointed the acting chairman of the State Committee for Deported Peoples in the Crimean Regional Executive Committee. There, he managed to get the leadership of the Central Asian republics and Crimea to permit the full return and was granted funding to support returning people. He held the post until March 1991.

Longstanding disagreements between followers of Osmanov and Dzhemilev became more apparent during the perestroika era. While the goal of Osmanov's Fergana faction, which later became the NDKT (Russian: НДКТ, Национального движения крымских татар) was to conform within the Soviet system was the restoration of the Crimean ASSR under the Leninist principle of national autonomy for titular indigenous peoples in their homeland, the Dzhemilev faction, at the time under the banner of the OKND, which later became the Mejilis, wanted the creation of an independent Crimean Tatar state. Osmanov was very afraid that the more radical OKND would exacerbate already-strained ethnic tensions in Crimea, with Tatarophobia being widespread and the OKND claiming more and more land in Crimea instead of trying to take more reconciliatory measures.

The mainstream Soviet dissident movement was very critical of Osmanov for wanting to work within the Soviet system to restore the Crimean ASSR instead of broadly opposing communism. Soviet dissident Leonid Plyushch called Osmanov as a "convinced marxist" Prominent Soviet dissidents like Andrey Sakharov and Petro Grigorenko sided with the much more aggressive OKND faction. Osmanov always dissented against the Dzhemilev-led wing of the Crimean Tatar rights movement for being too aggressive.

== Later years and death ==
After leaving the commission, Osmanov devoted himself to journalism and the NDKT. In 1991 he established the newspaper "Areket", which he was the editor of for the remainder of his life. In 1992 he moved to his homeland, Crimea, with his wife and daughter. In March 1993 he became the dean of the faculty for oriental studies at Taurida Ecological and Political University. Later that year he visited Turkey to meet with the Crimean Tatar diaspora there. The meeting went well, since many of the Crimean Tatars in diaspora agreed with his ideas. but Osmanov's disagreements with the Mejilis intensified after Dzhemilev made controversial comments to two Turkish newspapers about violence being inevitable.

However, before Osmanov could continue his political work, he was badly beaten while walking home from work on the evening of 6 November 1993 and was found dead of his injuries the next day. After his assassination, the NDKT became much weaker, and the OKND faction became even more powerful. He was buried in the Abdal cemetery. Two people, Konstantin Dovzhenko and Rail Khayrov were convicted of his murder and sentenced to 15 and 11 years in prison respectively. His widow complained to the Supreme Court of Ukraine, insisting that her husband was the victim of a political assassination and not a typical mugging by street hooligans.

== See also ==
- Deportation of the Crimean Tatars
- Racism in the Soviet Union
- Civil Rights Movement
- Right of return
- Nelson Mandela
- Martin Luther King Jr.
- Ismail Gaspirali
