= Crimean Tatar civil rights movement =

Movement in the Soviet Union to restore Crimean Tatar civil rights

- Part of the human rights movement in the Soviet Union
- Date: May 1944 – 14 November 1989
- Location: Uzbek and Tajik Soviet Socialist Republics; Crimean oblast
- Caused by: Deportation of the Crimean Tatars, Tatarophobia, De-Tatarization of Crimea
- Methods: Nonviolence, nonviolent resistance, civil disobedience
- Result: Crimean Tatar repatriation

The Crimean Tatar civil rights movement was a loosely-organized movement in the second half of the 20th century among the Crimean Tatars, who were living in exile following their deportation from Crimea in May 1944. It had the primary goals of regaining recognition as a distinct ethnic group, the right to return to live in Crimea, and restoration of the Crimean ASSR. When the movement started in the 1950s, its leaders were exclusively Communist Party workers and Red Army veterans, who were confident that the Soviet Union would soon fully rehabilitate them in accordance with proper adherence to Leninist national policy. As decades passed and the party remained hostile to even the most basic requests from Crimean Tatar petitions and deletions, a split emerged in the movement; many youths who were deported as children gave up hope in communism and took issue with the Leninist line towed by leaders of the movement. Eventually in 1989 the Soviet government lifted the restrictions on moving to Crimea from all exiled Crimean Tatars, and began the rehabilitation process. Since then, in the period of a few years, over 200,000 Crimean Tatars returned to Crimea, but they continue to lack a national autonomy of their own in Crimea.

== Causes ==
Starting in 1944, Crimean Tatars lived mostly in Central Asia with the designation as "special settlers", meaning that they had few rights. "Special settlers" were forbidden from leaving small designated areas and had to frequently sign in at a commandant's office. Soviet propaganda directed towards Uzbeks depicted Crimean Tatars as threats to their homeland, and as a result there were many documented hate crimes against Crimean-Tatar civilians by Uzbek Communist loyalists. In the 1950s the "special settler" regime ended, but Crimean Tatars were still kept closely tethered to Central Asia; while other deported ethnic groups like the Chechens, Karachays, and Kalmyks were fully allowed to return to their native lands during the Khrushchev thaw, economic and political reasons combined with basic misconceptions and stereotypes about Crimean Tatars led to Moscow and Tashkent being reluctant to allow Crimean Tatars the same right of return; the same decree that rehabilitated other deported nations and restored their national republics urged Crimean Tatars who wanted a national republic to seek "national reunification" in the Tatar ASSR in lieu of restoration of the Crimean ASSR, much to the dismay of Crimean Tatars who bore no connection to or desire to "return" to Tatarstan. Moscow's refusal to allow a return was not only based on a desire to satisfy the new Russian settlers in Crimea, who were very hostile to the idea of a return and had been subject to lots of Tatarophobic propaganda, but for economic reasons: high productivity from Crimean Tatar workers in Central Asia meant that letting the diaspora return would take a toll on Soviet industrialization goals in Central Asia. Historians have long noted that the violent resistance to confinement in exile from Chechens led to further willingness to let them return, while the non-violent Crimean Tatar movement did not lead to any desire for Crimean Tatars to leave Central Asia. In effect, the government was punishing Crimean Tatars for being Stakhanovites while rewarding the deported nations that contributed less to the building of socialism, creating further resentment.

A 1967 Soviet decree removed the charges against Crimean Tatars on paper while simultaneously referring to them not by their proper ethnonym but by the euphemism that eventually became standard of "citizens of Tatar nationality who formerly lived in Crimea", angering many Crimean Tatars who realized it meant they were not even seen as Crimean Tatars by the government. In addition, the Soviet government did nothing to facilitate their resettlement in Crimea and to make reparations for lost lives and confiscated property. Before the mass return in the perestroika era, Crimean Tatars made up only 1.5% of Crimea's population, since government entities at all levels took a variety of measures beyond the already-debilitating residence permit system to keep them in Central Asia.

== Methods ==
The abolition of the special settlement regime made it possible for Crimean Tatar rights activists to mobilize; initially, the primary method of raising grievances with the government was petitioning. Many for the right of return gained over 100,000 signatures; although other methods of protest were occasionally used, the movement remained completely non-violent. When only a small percentage of Crimean Tatars were allowed to return to Crimea, those who were not granted residence permits would return to Crimea and try to live under the radar. However, the lack of a residence permit resulted in a second deportation for them.

A last-resort method to avoid a second deportation was self-immolation, famously used by Crimean Tatar national hero Musa Mamut, one of those who moved to Crimea without a residence permit. He doused himself with gasoline and committed self-immolation in front of police trying to deport him on 23 June 1978. Mamut died of severe burns several days later, but expressed no regret for having committed self-immolation. Mamut posthumously became a symbol of Crimean Tatar resistance and nationhood, and remains celebrated by Crimean Tatars. Other notable self-immolations in the name of the Crimean Tatar right of return movement include that of Shavkat Yarullin, who fatally committed self-immolation in front of a government building in protest in October 1989, and Seidamet Balji who attempted self-immolation while being deported from Crimea in December that year but survived. Many other famous Crimean Tatars threatened government authorities with self-immolation if they continued to be ignored, including Hero of the Soviet Union Abdraim Reshidov. In the later years of the Soviet Union, Crimean Tatar activists held picket protests in Red Square.

== Results ==
For many decades, the government remained staunchly opposed to satisfying the demands for full rehabilitation for Crimean Tatars, and offered only very small token concessions over time, such as allowing a Crimean Tatar language faculty in Tashkent, although it was not officially called a Crimean Tatar language faculty and instead officially called the "Department of Tatar Language and Literature in Tashkent" due to censorship of the term "Crimean Tatar" as part of the government strategy of deliberately withholding re-recognition of Crimean Tatars as a distinct ethnic group. Eventually in 1978 the government came up with the idea of offering Crimean Tatars compact residence with cultural support in the Mubarek zone project.

After a prolonged effort of lobbying by the Crimean Tatar civil rights movement, the Soviet government established a commission in 1987 to evaluate the request for the right of return, chaired by Andrey Gromyko. Gromyko's condescending attitude and failure to assure them that they would have the right of return ended up concerning members of the Crimean Tatar civil rights movement. In June 1988 he issued an official statement that rejected the request for re-establishment of a Crimean Tatar autonomy in Crimea and supported only allowing an organized return of a few more Crimean Tatars, while agreeing to allow the lower-priority requests of having more publications and school instruction in the Crimean Tatar language at the local level among areas with the deported populations. The conclusion that "no basis to renew autonomy and grant Crimean Tatars the right to return" triggered widespread protests. Less than two years after Gromyko's commission had rejected their request for autonomy and return, pogroms against the deported Meskhetian Turks were taking place in Central Asia. During the pogroms, some Crimean Tatars were targeted as well, resulting in changing attitudes towards allowing Crimean Tatars to move back to Crimea. Eventually a second commission, chaired by Gennady Yanaev and inclusive of Crimean Tatars on the board, was established in 1989 to reevaluate the issue, and it was decided that the deportation was illegal and the Crimean Tatars were granted the full right to return, revoking previous laws intended to make it as difficult as possible for Crimean Tatars to move to Crimea.
