= Ay Petri yayla =

Massif and nature reserve in Crimea

- Ay Petri yaylası (Crimean Tatar); Ай-Петринська яйла (Ukrainian); Ай-Петринская яйла (Russian)
- IUCN category IV (habitat/species management area)

- Location within Crimea Location within Ukraine
- Nearest city: Yalta
- Coordinates: 44°27′04″N 34°03′10″E
- Area: 1,795.5 ha (17.955 km^{2})

Ay Petri yayla (Crimean Tatar: Ay Petri yaylası; Ukrainian: Ай-Петринська яйла, romanized: Ai-Petrynska yaila; Russian: Ай-Петринская яйла, romanized: Ay-Petrinskaya yayla) is a massif and regional nature reserve (zakaznik) located in Crimea, a region internationally recognised as part of Ukraine but occupied by Russia since 2014. It is one of the yaylas of the Crimean Mountains.

== Description ==
Ay Petri yayla, though it is a massif, is somewhat more plateau-like than other yaylas of the Crimean Mountains. At its highest peak, Ai-Petri, it reaches up to 1,346 m (4,416 ft). As the yayla approaches the Southern Coast, it drops steeply. Ay Petri yayla is home to a variety of tunnels with a combined length of 1,800 m (5,900 ft), as well as numerous caves. Like other yaylas, Ay Petri yayla has a limestone composition. 12.6% of its surface is covered by forests.

Ay Petri yayla is recognised as a regional landscape reserve (zakaznik) of Crimea, including an area of 1,795.5 ha (17.955 km^{2}). The reserve was declared due to the yayla's diversity of flora and fauna, as well as its underground wells which supply water to the nearby population. In addition to Ay Petri yayla itself, there are multiple nature reserves within the yayla, including the Grand Canyon of Crimea. The yayla is part of the Yalta Mountain-Forest Nature Reserve.

Environmental concerns regarding Ay Petri yayla have been particularly significant, with Anatoliy Hrytsenko calling on President Viktor Yushchenko to expand environmental protections to clear pollution on the mountain in 2007. In 2014, environmental activists protested plans by the government of Anatolii Mohyliov to expand recreational areas on the yayla, as well as for the removal of areas on the Southern Coast from the Yalta Mountain-Forest Nature Reserve.
