= Refat Appazov =

Soviet Crimean Tatar rocket scientist and civil rights activist

- Born: 8 September 1920; Simferopol, South Russia
- Died: 18 April 2008 (aged 87); Korolyov, Moscow Oblast, Russia
- Education: Bauman Moscow State Technical University
- Awards: USSR State Prize

Refat Fazıl oğlu Appazov (Russian: Рефат Фазылович Аппазов, romanized: Refat Fazylovich Appazov; 8 September 1920 – 18 April 2008) was a Soviet Crimean Tatar rocket scientist and colleague of Sergei Korolev who served as head of the ballistics department of Energia from 1961 to 1988. Unlike most Crimean Tatars, he was spared special settler status and exile to Central Asia since the authorities forgot to include him in the deportation due to being in Izhevsk at the time. As a result, he was left cut off from the rest of Crimean Tatar society in the Soviet Union for much of his life. Nevertheless, he managed to become an engineer in OKB-1 and later a teacher at the prestigious Moscow Aviation Institute despite repeatedly facing discrimination. After keeping quiet about his Crimean Tatar identity for most of his life, he became heavily involved in the right of return movement after seeing the 1987 announcement about the conclusion by the Gromyko commission downplaying the entire issue and rejecting full right of return to Crimea. He went on to be a member of the second committee dedicated to considering the issue of Crimean Tatar return, which overturned the conclusions of the Gromyko commission, and in 1991 he was elected as a delegate of the Crimean Tatar Qurultay.

== Early life ==
Appazov was born on 8 September 1920 to a Crimean Tatar family in Simferopol. Initially he attended Crimean Tatar primary school before moving to Yalta where he attended a Russian school. After completing secondary school in 1939 he went on to attend Bauman Moscow State Technical University. During World War II the school relocated to Izhevsk, where he worked as a milling machine operator at a factory in addition to his studies. Having been so far away from Crimea and not with any Crimean Tatar diaspora group at the time of the deportation, he was spared exile to Central Asia, (Note: Many other Crimean Tatars outside of Crimea during the deportation, be it living in other parts of the Soviet Union or fighting on the frontlines of the war in the Red Army, were later subject to exile to Central Asia and registration under the special settler regime, for example, Yuri Osmanov and his family. However, unlike other Crimean Tatars later sent to Central Asia, Appazov was in Izhevsk at the time, an area with negligible Crimean Tatar presence but a sizable population of Volga Tatars (who were often referred to by the same demonym of simply "Tatar" as Crimean Tatars in official Soviet documents, despite huge differences between the two groups), which allowed him to remain unnoticed by the NKVD for quite some time, and by then he had made connections with high-ranking engineers who vouched for him and demanded he be given an exemption.) but effectively cut off from the rest of the Crimean Tatar community afterwards.

== Engineering career ==
Upon graduation in 1946 he began working at a former artillery plant in Moscow, which soon became a rocket technology research institute. During a business trip to Germany to analyze V-2 missiles, he was introduced to Sergey Korolyov, chief designer of OKB-1, who recruited him to work in the space program and later personally confronted Beria and insisted that Appazov be allowed to stay and spared exile when word of his Crimean Tatar ethnicity reached the NKVD. Despite being given an exception from exile, he was still treated like a member of a "hostile nationality" at various points in his career, at one period not being able to use materials designated as "top secret" and having to ask Russian subordinates for technical reports in order to get work done. Nevertheless, he secured a job teaching at the Moscow Aviation Institute from 1959 to 1993 and served as head of the ballistics department of Energia from 1961 to 1988. During his career is participated in the development of the R-1 ballistic missile, R-5 "Pobeda", Sputnik 1, R-7 Semyorka, and Buran as well as projects for flights to the Moon, Venus, and Mars.

== Later years and Crimean Tatar identity ==
Throughout his life he had been plagued with "survivor's guilt" for having been spared the fate of the rest of his people, and suffered several traumatic episodes of being reminded of the situation; during a two-day trip to Crimea in the 1950s he was horrified upon seeing the site of pieces of Tatar gravestones used as bricks in a bathroom, and later experienced depression and despair to the point of mental breakdown whenever reminded of the lost homeland, such as by seeing images of the Yalta coast on television. During rare meetings with relatives the issue of exile was rarely discussed, but Appazov gained an impression that the government had no desire to allow Crimean Tatars to return, having allowed exiled Caucasian peoples to return but gone above and beyond to minimize Crimean Tatar presence in Crimea. Having suppressed his Crimean Tatar identity for most of his life, Appazov became enraged upon seeing the official statement by the Gromyko commission in 1987 claiming there was "no basis to renew autonomy and grant Crimean Tatars the right to return" as well as completely downplaying and dismissing the situation of the Crimean Tatars and their desire to return. He subsequently reached out to the staff of the Lenin Bayrağı newspaper to establish contacts with the civil rights movement in the diaspora and gain information about the political situation, since the newspaper itself did not highlight Crimean Tatar struggles. Getting highly involved in the right of return movement ultimately led to his retirement in 1988. Soon thereafter he was given a seat on a second committee (chaired by Vitaly Doguzhiyev) to address the situation of Crimean Tatars - one that, unlike the Gromyko commission, had Crimean Tatars on it (the four others being Refat Chubarov, Ferit Ziyadinov, Akhtem Tippa, and Riza Asanov). After the conclusion of the committee, officially supporting the right of return, in 1991 he became a delegate in the Crimean Tatar Qurultay and from 1991 to 1995 he was a member of the Presidium of the Mejlis of the Crimean Tatar People. In 2001 he published his memoir "Следы в сердце и в памяти" (English: Traces in the Heart and Memory), and in a 2005 interview he stated: "I never stopped feeling like a Crimean Tatar". He lived for the remainder of his life in Korolev, Moscow, where he died on 18 April 2008 and was buried in Crimea in accordance with his will.

== Awards ==
- USSR State Prize
- Order of Lenin
- Order of the Red Banner of Labour
- Order of the Badge of Honor
