= Ai-Petri =

Mountain in Crimea, Ukraine

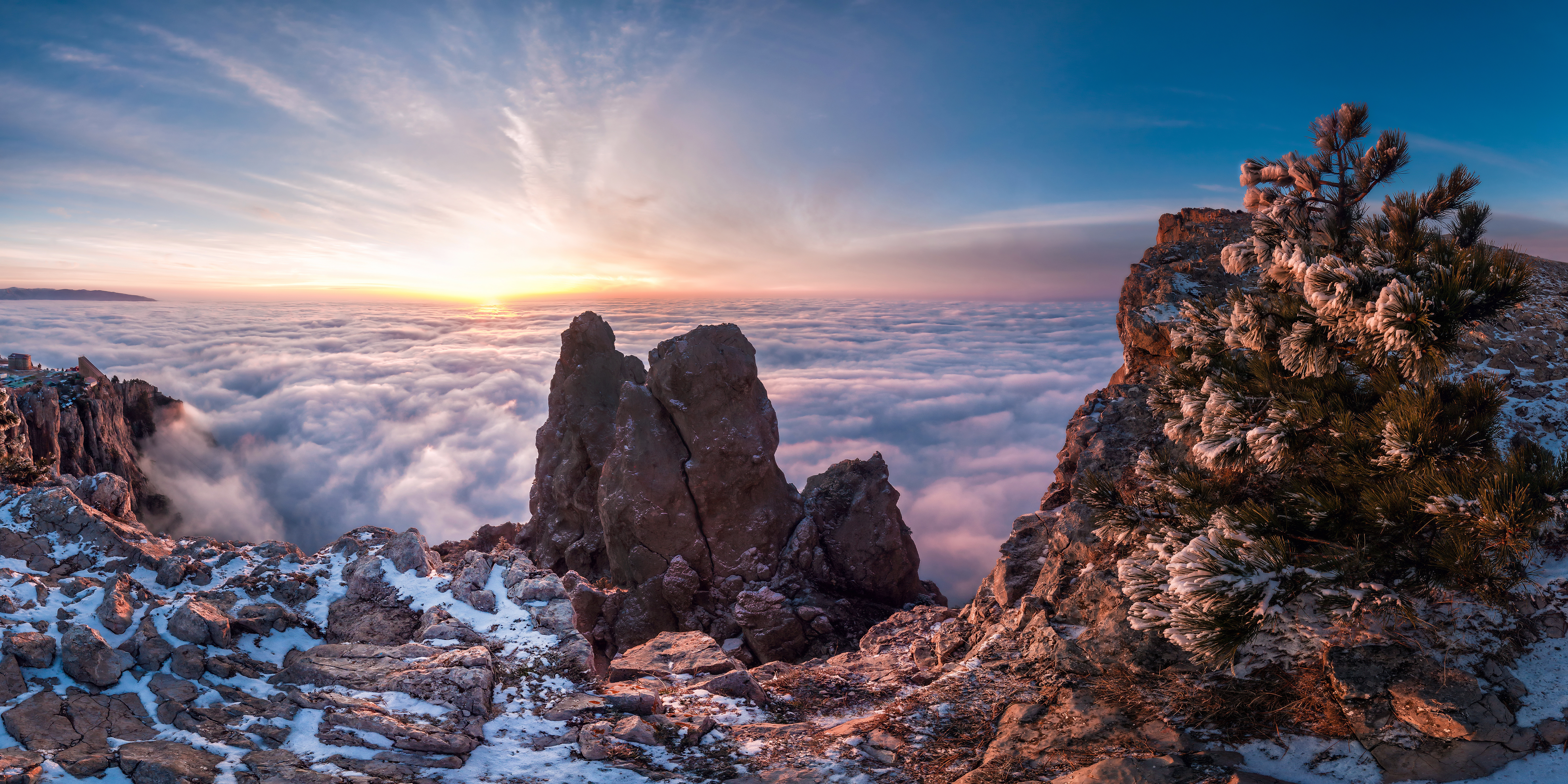
- A panorama of the winter on Ai-Petri

Highest point
- Elevation: 1,234 m (4,049 ft)
- Listing: Mountains of Ukraine
- Coordinates: 44°27′04″N 34°3′10″E

Geography
- Location within Crimea
- Parent range: Crimean Mountains

Ai-Petri (Crimean Tatar: Ay Petri; Ukrainian: Ай-Петрі) is a peak in the Crimean Mountains. For administrative purposes it is in the Yalta municipality of Crimea. The name is of Greek origin, and translates as "St. Peter" (Greek: Άγιος Πέτρος, romanized: Ágios Pétros).

== Overview ==
Ai-Petri is one of the windiest places in Crimea. The wind blows for 125 days a year, reaching a speed of 50 m/s (110 mph).

The peak is located above the city of Alupka and the town of Koreiz.

There is a cable car that takes passengers from a station near Alupka to the main area in Ai-Petri.

The Ai-Petri massif makes up one side of the Grand Canyon of Crimea, with the other side being the Boyka massif.

A military base is located here. It was attacked in May 2024. Newsweek reported that a Russian commander was killed in the attack.

== Climate ==
Climate data for Ai-Petri (1991–2020)
| Month | Jan | Feb | Mar | Apr | May | Jun | Jul | Aug | Sep | Oct | Nov | Dec | Year |
|---|---|---|---|---|---|---|---|---|---|---|---|---|---|
| Mean daily maximum °C (°F) | 0.0 (32.0) | 0.2 (32.4) | 2.6 (36.7) | 8.3 (46.9) | 13.4 (56.1) | 17.6 (63.7) | 20.6 (69.1) | 20.4 (68.7) | 15.2 (59.4) | 11.1 (52.0) | 6.2 (43.2) | 1.5 (34.7) | 9.8 (49.6) |
| Daily mean °C (°F) | −2.8 (27.0) | −3.0 (26.6) | −0.6 (30.9) | 4.7 (40.5) | 10.1 (50.2) | 13.8 (56.8) | 16.7 (62.1) | 16.5 (61.7) | 11.5 (52.7) | 7.4 (45.3) | 2.9 (37.2) | −1.2 (29.8) | 6.3 (43.3) |
| Mean daily minimum °C (°F) | −5.7 (21.7) | −6.2 (20.8) | −3.8 (25.2) | 1.4 (34.5) | 6.6 (43.9) | 10.2 (50.4) | 13.1 (55.6) | 12.7 (54.9) | 7.9 (46.2) | 3.9 (39.0) | −0.4 (31.3) | −4.1 (24.6) | 3.0 (37.4) |
| Average precipitation mm (inches) | 125 (4.9) | 108 (4.3) | 84 (3.3) | 58 (2.3) | 57 (2.2) | 69 (2.7) | 47 (1.9) | 57 (2.2) | 73 (2.9) | 84 (3.3) | 104 (4.1) | 139 (5.5) | 1,005 (39.6) |
| Average precipitation days (≥ 1.0 mm) | 13.5 | 11.2 | 11.6 | 8.4 | 7.3 | 7.0 | 5.3 | 5.5 | 6.6 | 8.3 | 9.2 | 12.8 | 106.7 |
| Average relative humidity (%) | 81.0 | 78.6 | 76.1 | 68.4 | 66.2 | 67.9 | 64.6 | 65.4 | 70.8 | 71.0 | 73.1 | 81.2 | 72.0 |
| Mean monthly sunshine hours | 85 | 103 | 144 | 188 | 264 | 286 | 320 | 290 | 219 | 170 | 115 | 74 | 2,258 |
Source: NOAA

== Gallery ==
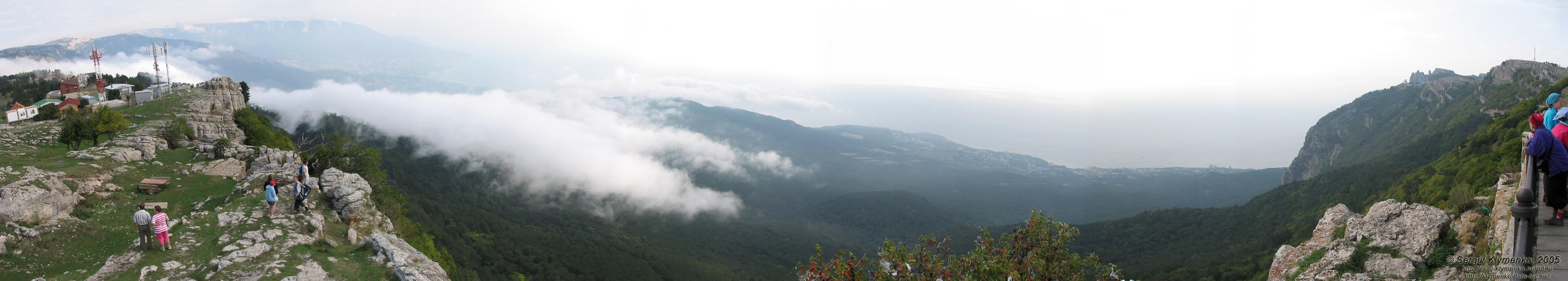
A panoramic view from Ai-Petri.

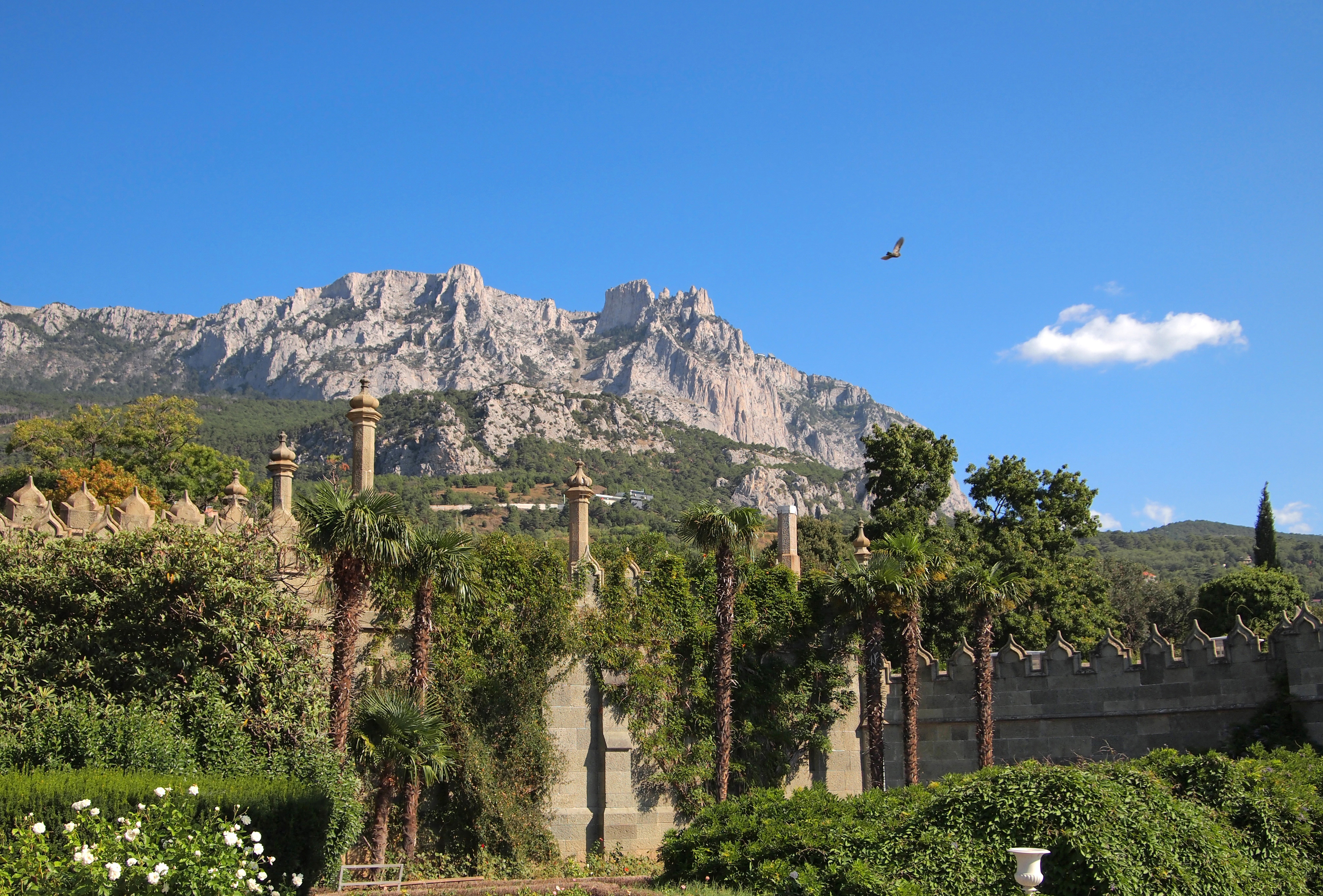
View of Ai-Petri from Vorontsov's Palace in Alupka.

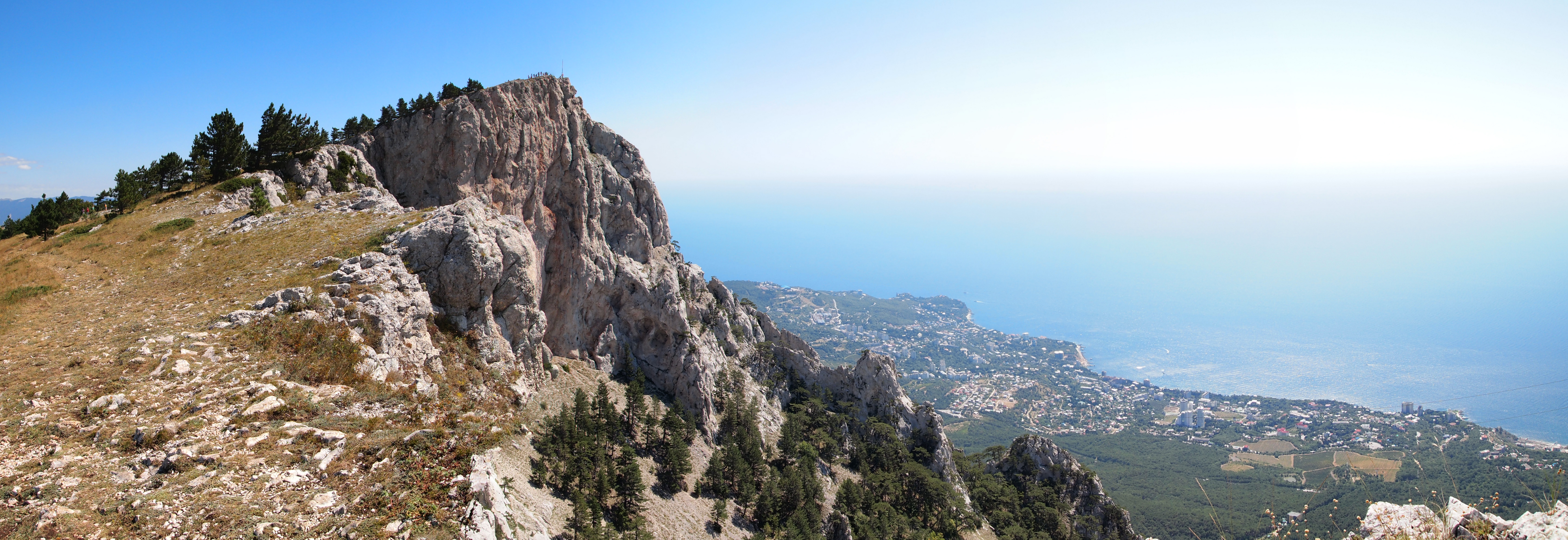
View on Ai-Petri

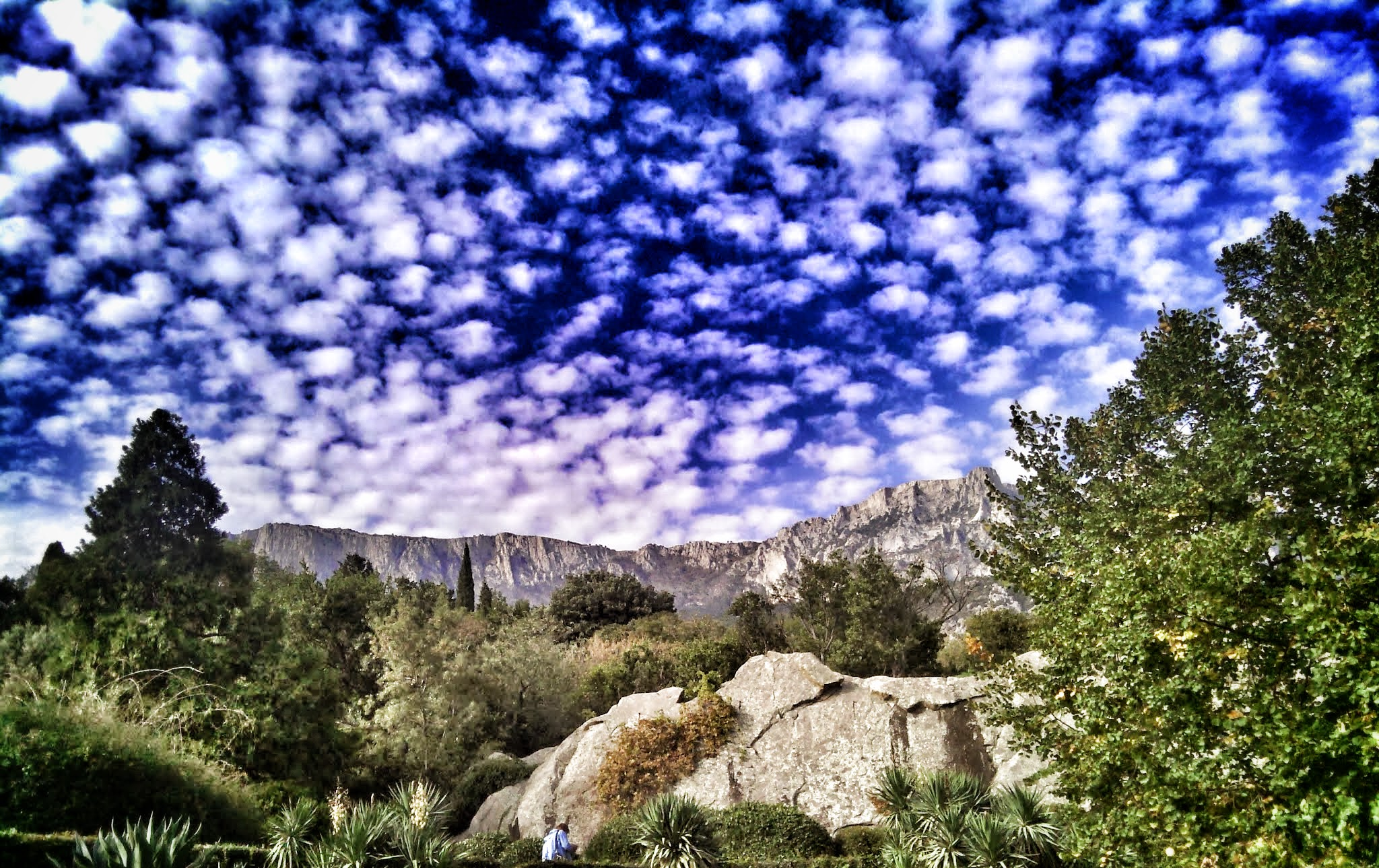
View of Ai-Petri from Vorontsov's Palace in Alupka.

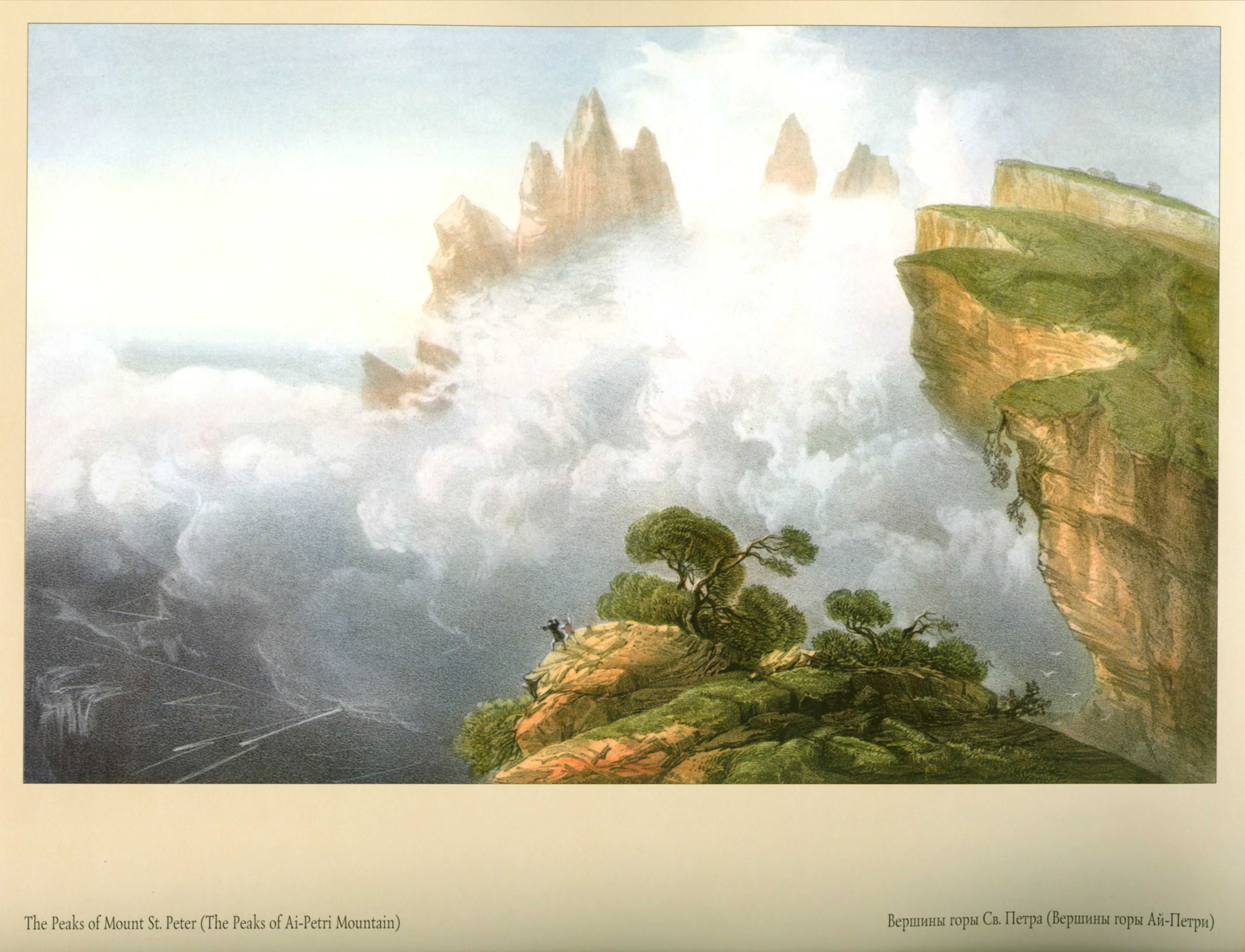
Ai-Petri in the 1850s, by Carlo Bossoli
