= Grand Canyon (Crimea) =

Canyon in Crimea

Grand Canyon of Crimea
- Великий каньйон Криму (Ukrainian); Большой каньон Крыма (Russian)
- IUCN category VI (protected area with sustainable use of natural resources)

- Location within Crimea Location within Ukraine
- Location: Crimean Mountains, Crimea
- Nearest city: Bakhchysarai
- Coordinates: 44°31′40″N 34°01′00″E
- Area: 500 ha (5.0 km^{2})
- Established: 1974

The Grand Canyon of Crimea (Ukrainian: Великий каньйон Криму, romanized: Velykyi kanion Krymu; Russian: Большой каньон Крыма, romanized: Bolshoy kanon Kryma) is a canyon located in southern Crimea, an area internationally recognised as part of Ukraine but currently controlled by Russia. The Grand Canyon separates the Ai-Petri and Boyka massifs, and the area of the Grand Canyon zakaznik (nature reserve) is 500 ha (5.0 km^{2}). It has a depth of 320 m (1,050 ft), and its bottom are several springs.

== Description ==
The Grand Canyon of Crimea was formed around 2 million years ago by a tectonic crack. It is approximately 3 km (1.9 mi) long, and its walls, made of limestone, reach 320 m (1,050 ft) high. At the bottom of the canyon, widths reach as thin as 2 m (6.6 ft). The canyon is located between the Ai-Petri and Boyka massifs. The walls of the canyon are home to a variety of different types of trees and herbs, but are prone to rock slides during dry weather and after rain. On the Boyka side of the canyon is the Cathedral of Christ the Saviour, a ruined church Eastern Orthodox icons are placed.

At the bottom of the canyon are a variety of bodies of water, including several springs, for which it is best known. Among its rivers are the Avuzıñ Özen and the Kökköz. The former river itself produces several springs, among them the Pania, Crimea's largest karstic spring. During the dry season, one can venture on from the Avuzıñ Özen to the Cow's Grotto. There are also forests at the Canyon's bottom, inhabited by hedgehogs, badgers, and roes. The canyon's bottom is typically cool, owing to the coverage of yew, oak, and beech forests located on the slopes. One can find rare species of Cypripedium in the canyon.

The first person to describe in detail the features of the Grand Canyon of Crimea was Russo-Ukrainian scientist Ivan Puzanov, who explored the canyon in 1925. Puzanov also gave the canyon its name.

== Legends ==
The Grand Canyon of Crimea is home to several local legends. Prior to his 1925 description of the canyon, Puzanov recorded a local legend from a groundskeeper at Yusupov Palace, who stated, "Our peasants say that at night, wild cries and squeals are heard, and laughter - demons celebrate their weddings then." This legend possibly emerged due to the loud and destructive flooding in the canyon in the aftermath of rain and during the spring, when the Avuzıñ Özen rises by 5 metres.

The Postal Oak, located near the Cow's Grotto, is another legendary location. It is a destroyed tree which is said to grant the wishes of those who deposit notes into it.

The most significant landmark in the canyon, however, is the Fountain of Youth, or Kara-Gol (Ukrainian: Кара-Голь). The Fountain of Youth, a 5-metre erosion in the Avuzıñ Özen, is thought by local legend to possess rejuvenating powers, and never surpasses 10-13°C (50-55°F).
