= Krasnyi Mak =

Krasnyi Mak Büyük Qaralez Красный Мак
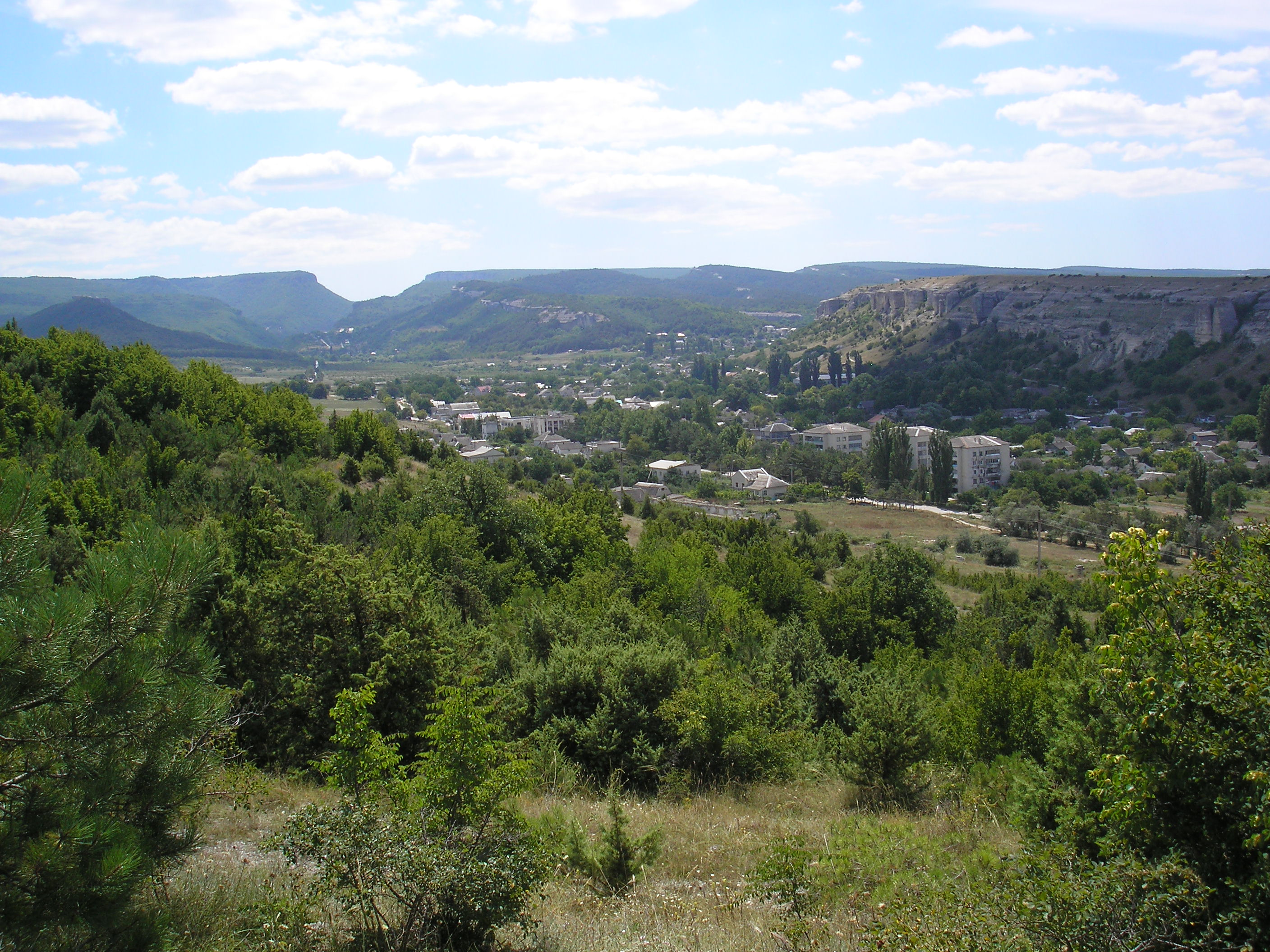

- Location of Büyük Qaralez within Crimea
- Coordinates: 44°38′38″N 33°46′51″E
- Country: Disputed; Russia, Ukraine
- Republic: Crimea
- District: Bakhchysarai Raion
- Elevation: 120 m (390 ft)

Population (2014)
  - Total: 1,663
- Time zone: UTC+4 (MSK)
- Postal code: 98464
- Area code: +380-6554

Krasnyi Mak (Ukrainian: Красний Мак; Crimean Tatar: Büyük Qaralez, Буюк Къаралез; Russian: Красный Мак, romanized: Krasny Mak) is a village in Bakhchysarai Raion of the Autonomous Republic of Crimea, a disputed territory recognized by a majority of countries as part of Ukraine and incorporated by Russia as the Republic of Crimea. It is located in the Crimean Mountains, southerly of Bakhchysarai. The village stretches along the Bystrianka creek, a tributary of the Belbek River. Population: 1,663 (2014 Census).

Near the village are the medieval settlements of Mangup and Eski-Kermen. During the Soviet period, the area became a local center, where blocks of flats have been constructed.
