= Musa Mamut =

Soviet Crimean Tatar human rights activist

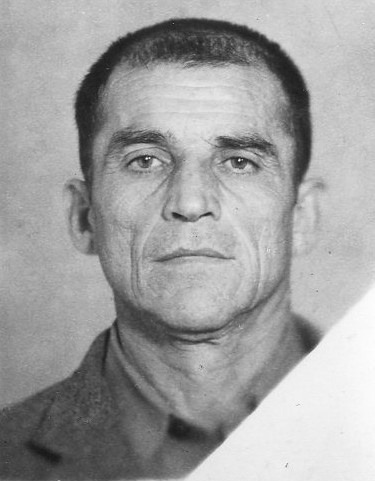
- Born: 20 February 1931; Balaklava District, Crimean ASSR, Russian SFSR, Soviet Union
- Died: 28 June 1978 (aged 47); Simferopol, Crimean Oblast, Ukrainian SSR, Soviet Union
- Cause of death: Burns from self-immolation
- Resting place: Besh-Terek, Crimea
- Occupations: Machinist and tractor driver
- Known for: Self-immolation in Crimea as a sign of protest against the repression of Crimean Tatars
- Spouse: Zekiye Abdullayeva

Musa Mamut (Russian and Crimean Tatar Cyrillic: Муса Мамут; 20 February 1931 – 28 June 1978) was a deported Crimean Tatar who immolated himself in Crimea as a sign of protest against the enforced exile of indigenous Crimean Tatars. His self-immolation symbolized the Crimean Tatar belief that deportation back to exile was worse than death. Today, he remains an icon of the Crimean Tatar civil rights movement. His act of ultimate self-sacrifice was later repeated by other Crimean Tatars, but Mamut remains the most well-known Crimean self-immolator, with his act being commemorated annually with large memorials. Crimean Tatar literature often describes him as an eternal flame illuminating Crimea.

== Biography ==
Mamut was born on 20 February 1931 in Uzundza, Balaclava region, Crimea to a shepherd family. He had five brothers and two sisters. In 1944 Joseph Stalin accused the entire Crimean Tatar nation of collaborating with the Nazis, and sentenced them to exile. Like thousands of other Crimean Tatars, Musa's family was driven out of its home, they were loaded onto a cattle wagon and deported to Uzbek SSR. In exile, the family lived in poverty, which caused four of Mamut's siblings to die of malnutrition. Deported to the Mirzachul district of Tashkent oblast, he began working in a cotton mill despite being only 13 years old, and was frequently beaten by the commandants, on one occasion to the point of unconsciousness for being late to regular registration, something required of all Crimean Tatars in exile under the "special settler" system. With only four years of education, he entered an agriculture school in January 1956 and went on to become a tractor driver on a state farm in 1957. Not long afterward he met Zekiye Abullayeva, and shortly afterwards they married; until 1973 the couple resided in Yangiyul.

During the era of Leonid Brezhnev the Crimean Tatar repatriation movement was supported by Soviet human rights activists, such as Petro Grigorenko and Andrei Sakharov. In September 1967 the Soviet authorities dropped the accusation against the Crimean Tatar people, but unlike other deported ethnic groups, they were not universally permitted to return to their homeland, and a vast majority were required to remain in Uzbekistan by the residence permit system.

In April 1975 Mamut came back to Crimea. He settled near Simferopol, in the village of Besh-Terek where he bought a house. But he did not obtain a notarial certificate of the house and a residence permit. He was arrested on 23 April 1976, and on 13 May 1976 he was sentenced to two years imprisonment without probation in Kremenchuk, Poltava Oblast. His wife, Zekiye Abdullayeva, was sentenced to two years probation. After several months the rest of his sentence was changed to penal labor in a local refinery and on 18 July 1977 the court released him. But once again, the local authorities denied his residency and continued to harass him. He often talked with his friends about the tragic situation of the Crimean Tatars.

On 20 June 1978, new criminal charges were brought against his family and when the police came to his house on 23 June 1978 to deport them, Mamut doused himself with petrol and lit a match. He died of his burns five days later on 28 June 1978. While he lay dying he said "someone had to do this". He was buried in Besh-Terek.

On 4 July 1978, Russian dissident Andrei Sakharov sent a letter to Leonid Brezhnev and asked him to assure the return of justice to Crimean Tatars.

== See also ==
- List of political self-immolations
- Detatarization of Crimea
- Tatarophobia
