= Gromyko Commission =

1987–1988 Soviet government commission on Crimean Tatar legal rights

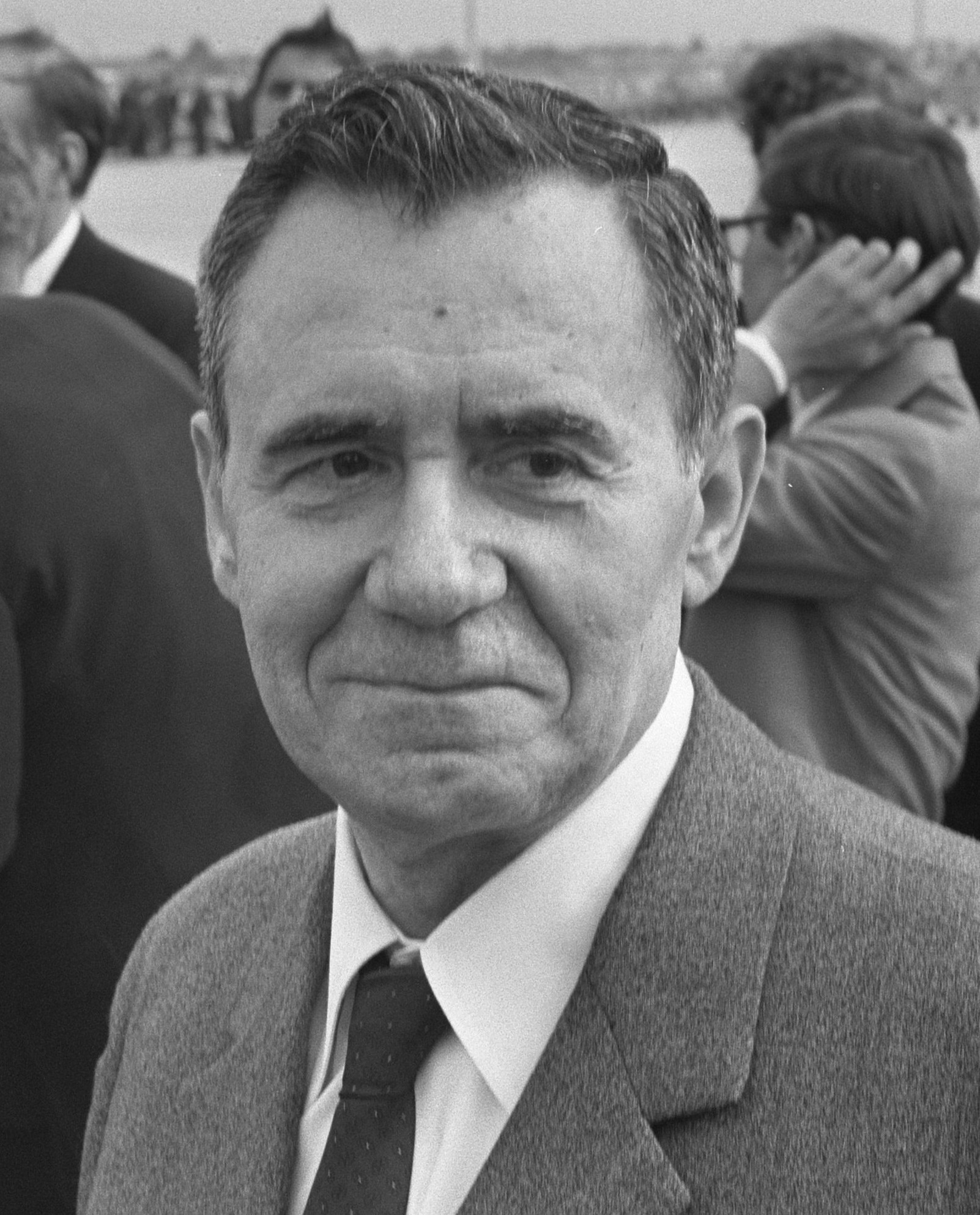
Andrei Gromyko, the chairman of the commission, who remained consistently opposed to restoring the rights of Crimean Tatars in the Soviet Union, nor even conceding to the fact that Crimean Tatars are a distinct ethnic group (see Denial of Crimean Tatars by the Soviet Union)

The Gromyko Commission, officially titled the State Commission for Consideration of Issues Raised in Applications of Citizens of the USSR from Among the Crimean Tatars (Russian: Государственная комиссия по рассмотрению вопросов, которые ставятся в обращениях граждан СССР из числа крымских татар) was the first state commission on the subject of addressing what the dubbed "the Tatar problem". Formed in July 1987 and led by Andrey Gromyko, it issued a conclusion in June 1988 rejecting all major demands of Crimean Tatar civil rights activists ranging from right of return to restoration of the Crimean ASSR.

== Background ==
In May 1944 the Crimean Tatar people was deported from Crimea on blanket accusations of mass collaboration with Nazi Germany. Most were sent to the Uzbek SSR and scattered around various oblasts within the Uzbek SSR, but some were sent to other areas such as the Mari ASSR. Those who did not collaborate with the Nazis were not spared deportation. Even the families of Heroes of the Soviet Union where the head of the household was Crimean Tatar were subject to deportation. (Note: Crimean Tatar women married to non-Crimean Tatar men were not subject to deportation, but non-Crimean Tatar women married to Crimean Tatar men were deported with their husbands.) Crimean Tatars who were members of the Communist Party and in leadership positions in the Crimean ASSR government, as well Crimean Tatars serving in the Red Army and even Tajfa Crimean Tatar Holocaust survivors were subject to exile. As special settlers in diaspora they had few civil rights and were forbidden from leaving a small radius of the village or city they were assigned to, punishable by 20 years in prison.

The Crimean ASSR was dissolved on 30 June 1945, and a campaign of mass detatarization of Crimea followed: Crimean Tatar books were burned, villages with Crimean Tatar names were renamed, and Crimean Tatar cemeteries were not only destroyed but the gravestones used as building materials. Crimea was quickly resettled by waves of ethnic Russian and Ukrainian immigrants, many of whom were given houses and property of deported Crimean Tatars.

In 1956 other nations deported with accusations of mass treason were permitted to return and their titular republics were officially restored - such as the Chechens and Ingush, Kalmyks, Balkars, and Karachays. The deported Caucasian peoples heavily resisted their exile, many participating in a prolonged guerrilla war against the NKVD in the mountains of the Caucasus. Abreks, like Akhmed Khuchbarov and Laysat Baisarova became folk heroes of those deported peoples. In contrast, Crimean Tatars put up considerably less resistance to exile, but still had a strong desire to return. The decree rehabilitating the aforementioned deported peoples of the Caucasus in 1956 did not restore the Crimean ASSR, and said that Crimean Tatars who wanted a national autonomy could "reunite" with the Volga Tatars of the Tatar ASSR. (Note: The Crimean Tatars are not closely related to the Tatars proper of Tatarstan, who are a Bulgar people with origins in Kazan. Many other ethnic groups not part of the Volga Tatars (who are now just called Tatars) have historically been called Tatar, such as the Azerbaijanis, formerly called Caucasian Tatars. After the deportation of the Crimean Tatars, the Soviet Union did not recognize Crimean Tatars as a distinct ethnic group and frequently suggested Crimean Tatars "return" to Tatarstan despite the fact that Crimean Tatars have no ancestral roots in Tatarstan or common ancestor with the Volga Tatars.)

For twenty years, the government maintained that their national issue had been "solved" by the decree in 1967 which proclaimed that "people of Tatar nationality formerly living in Crimea" [sic] were "rehabilitated". The decree, published selectively in newspapers where Crimean Tatars lived for them to see, showed that the state no longer recognized Crimean Tatars as a distinct ethnic group, through the use of the euphemism "people of Tatar nationality formerly living in Crimea". The decree did not answer any of the requests of Crimean Tatar rights activists at the time, specifically official rehabilitation by the state restoration of the Crimean ASSR with a Crimean Tatar national district, the right to return to Crimea. As more and more tried to return to Crimea, the government made it even harder for Crimean Tatars to return to Crimea by issuing decrees in the 1970s tightening the passport regime in Crimea.

Because they were not a recognized ethnic group and lumped into the Tatars in censuses despite being a completely separate ethnic group of a different origin, it was very hard to determine what the Crimean Tatar population was in the Soviet Union during the struggle for the right of return.

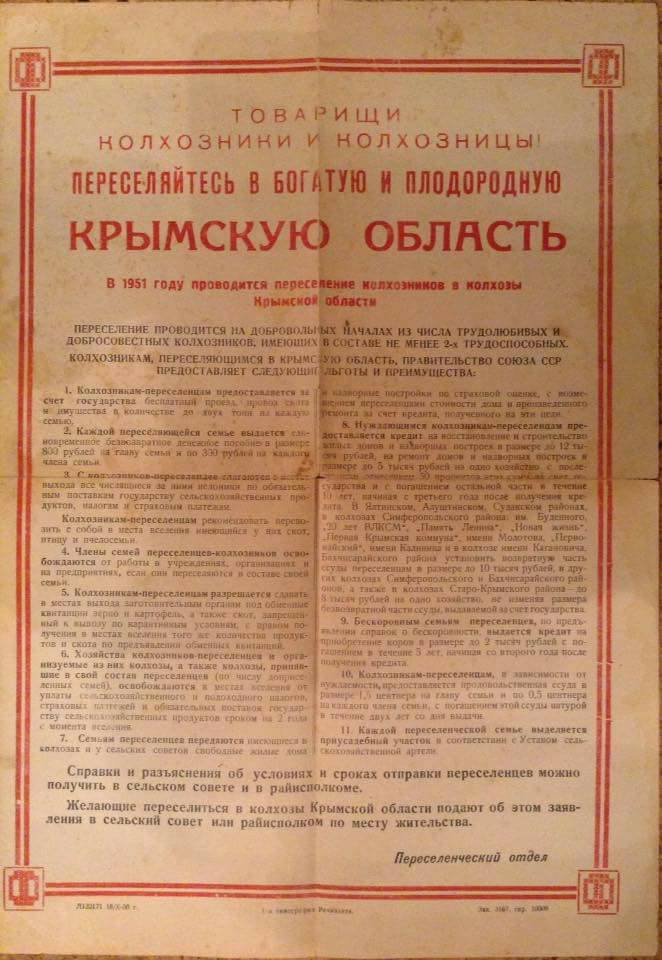
Flyer encouraging Russians to resettle in Crimea

When pressed on the issue by foreign journalists, the government insisted that Crimean Tatars had equal rights and but that most simply did not want to return to Crimea and had "taken root" in places of exile. However, when Crimean Tatars tried to move to Crimea, they were almost always denied the required propiska (residence permit) and subject to re-deportation, while slavic migrants to Crimea faced no such barriers to getting permission to live in Crimea and were frequently encouraged to move there. While Crimean Tatars were told that Crimea was already overpopulated as an excuse for not letting them return, even though newspapers frequently advertised the need for more workers in Crimea.

In the Uzbek SSR, where most Crimean Tatars lived, those who expressed desire to move to Crimea were told that they could not move to Crimea and should know better than to ask for the right of return, and Crimean Tatars who tried to return to Crimea were almost always forced to leave. Nevertheless, most Crimean Tatars still wanted to return to Crimea.

== Initial Red Square protest and delegations ==
During the early days of the Crimean Tatar national movement, Crimean Tatars sent large delegations of highly respected Crimean Tatar activists and party members to Moscow to meet with Soviet leaders and ask for right of return and restoration of the Crimean ASSR and present them with petitions. However, as time passed and the delegations accomplished little besides being participants being berated for their participation, such delegations and visits to Moscow became smaller and less frequent. However, due to perestroika, Crimean Tatar activists developed a renewed interest in visiting Moscow en masse. In addition, they hoped that under reduced censorship the media would be willing to listen to and include their opinions in media coverage of the national issue instead of maintaining the line that the issue was settled. On 20 June 1987 the first Crimean Tatar delegates arrived in Moscow, where they visited the offices of various newspapers, magazines, and TV stations as well as the writers union and talked about their exile and requested that their letters and petitions be published, but they were typically turned down. Later on 26 June several Crimean Tatars met with Pyotr Demichev, who only agreed to tell Gorbachev about their comments. Later on in early July several dozen Crimean Tatars began picketing in Red Square holding signs calling for right of return. The size of the protests grew quickly: the picket in front of the building of the Central Committee of the CPSU on 23 July drew around 100 protesters, but the number increased to around 500 just two days later.

== Formation of commission ==
On 9 July 1987 the government agreed to form a commission decide the fate of the Crimean Tatar people. The day before, a small delegation of Crimean Tatars met with People's Writer of the USSR Yevgeny Yevtushenko, who then encouraged Soviet leaders to give them a meeting or at least listen to them. Originally they were given a meeting with Pyotr Demichev, not Gorbachev; Demichev was not sympathetic to their petitioning but did forward their message to Gorbachev.

The issue made it to discussion in the politburo, and Gorbachev, who was reluctant to make any solid decisions on the issue, decided to outsource the issue to a commission. Subsequently, Gromyko, who rarely handled domestic issues, was selected by Gorbachev to head the commission despite his extreme reluctance to meet with Crimean Tatars and his hostile attitude towards the ethnic group. In a conversation with Gorbachev, he expressed desire to ignore the Crimean Tatars entirely and keep them in places of exile as was policy for the past decades. Nevertheless, Gromyko was appointed head of the commission, and he reluctantly discussed the issue with other Soviet politicians.

The leadership of the commission consisted of various senior Soviet politicians who had strong feelings on the issue, specifically Viktor Chebrikov, Vitaly Vorotnikov, Vladimir Shcherbitsky, Inomjon Usmonxoʻjayev, Pyotr Demichev, Alexander Yakovlev, Anatoly Lukyanov, Georgy Razumovsky, but no Crimean Tatars.

== Period of operation ==
After asking for meetings with Mikhail Gorbachev, 21 Crimean Tatar representatives eventually met in the Kremlin with Gromyko on 27 July 1987 in a very unproductive meeting for 2 hours and 27 minutes where he demanded Crimean Tatars be more calm but was extremely condescending insulted them as an "invented" ethnic group and showed his hatred for Crimean Tatars, living up to his nickname "Mr. No."

Compounded by the publication of the libelous announcement from TASS in central newspapers the next day about the formation of the commission, many Crimean Tatar activists and even communist elders were very disappointed as it became obvious that the commission was unwilling to seriously consider their demands. Later another statement from Gromyko warning that any attempt to put pressure on state organs would not work out in their favor was republished by TASS.

Meanwhile, authorities in Crimea remained hostile to the idea of allowing Crimean Tatar right of return, and further tightened the passport regime in Crimea as additional Crimean Tatars attempted to arrive and register in the peninsula. A decree signed by Nikolai Ryzhkov created special restrictions on registering new residents in Crimea as well as Krasnodar. The government characterized the Crimean Tatar desire to return and restoration of the Crimean ASSR as an extreme position and claimed such positions were not specific.

=== Central Initiative Group actions ===
Despite Gromyko's warning that increased protests and other forms of public discontent would not be taken well, members of the Central Initiative Group (OKND) led by Mustafa Dzhemilev continued to remain in Moscow, holding rallies in Izmailovsky Park. Prominent representatives from the Dzhemilev faction including Sabriye Seutova, Safinar Dzhemileva, Reshat Dzhemilev, and Fuat Ablyamitov. While the original advocates of the Crimean Tatar national movement who were condemned by mainstream Soviet dissidents as Marxists, many members of the more radical Central Initiative Group listed above, among others, openly solicited support from the West, which concerned the more moderate NDKT. The Central Initiative group disproportionately of the younger generation born in exile and had never been part of the national movement before, and grew in power as Soviet authorities failed to meaningfully address Crimean Tatar rights.

== Results ==
Despite being sent various proposals for plans to restore the Crimean ASSR and return Crimean Tatars to Crimea, in addition to polling information of Crimean Tatars showing that a solid majority supported returning to Crimea, the requests of the Crimean Tatar community were rejected. The conclusion statement issued by Gromyko in June 1988 stated there was "no basis" restore the Crimean ASSR because of the current demographics of Crimea, and suggested only a small percent of the Crimean Tatars to Crimea to work in Crimea under an organized recruitment scheme, but maintained that there would be no mass return of Crimean Tatars, and instead offered additional small-scale measures to address the cultural needs of Crimean Tatars places of exile.

It also did not agree to restore the official recognition of Crimean Tatars as a distinct ethnic group.

=== Reception and aftermath ===
Responses to the conclusions of the commission were overwhelmingly negative; even people the most loyal communist Crimean Tatars were disappointed by the conclusions of the commission and criticized the lack of good faith on part of the commission. For example Rollan Kadyev, by then having evolved politically to the point of opposing the rally in Red Square out of fear it would provoke authorities and frequently telling other Crimean Tatars to not respond to provocations from the government and maintain patriotism, expressed dismay at the idea that only a few more Crimean Tatars could be allowed to move to Crimea, which he dubbed "lottery for the homeland." He also criticized Gromyko's conclusions that the Crimean ASSR could not be restored because of demographic reasons, noting that the Kazakh SSR was formed when Kazakhs were only 13% of the population of the region.

Barely a year after the conclusion of the commission rejecting return and restoration of the Crimean ASSR, a second commission was composed to re-evaluated the issue, but headed by Yanaev instead of Gromyko and inclusive of Crimean Tatars on the board. Only in 1989 were the restrictions on the use of the term Crimean Tatar officially lifted.
