= NDKT =

Crimean Tatar civil rights organization

National Division of Crimean Tatars Национальное движения крымских татар
- Abbreviation: NDKT
- Leader: Yuri Osmanov
- Founded: 1987
- Dissolved: 1993
- Headquarters: Fergana, Uzbekistan
- Ideology: Crimean autonomy Marxism–Leninism
- Political position: Far-left

The National Division of Crimean Tatars (Russian: Национальное движения крымских татар, NDKT) was a Crimean Tatar civil rights organization that was highly active in the late Soviet era.

== History ==
Formally founded in 1987 from what was then the Fergana Initiative Group, it united various small-scale Crimean Tatar initiative groups in the Uzbek SSR, with the exception of the breakaways from the Dzhemilev faction (who called themselves the Central Initiative Group at the time). The platform consisted of recognition as a distinct ethnic group, full right of return to Crimea, and restoration of the Crimean ASSR – with Marxist-Leninism as the ideological central principle, in contrast to the pro-Western OKND. The organization fell into obscurity after the assassination of its leader Yuri Osmanov in 1993 and the subsequent rise of the Mejilis.
