= OKND =

Crimean Tatar civil rights organization in the Soviet Union

The OKND (Russian: Организация крымскотатарского национального движения) was an anti-communist grouping of Crimean Tatars and the successor of the Central Initiative Group in the late Soviet era. It was formed in opposition to the Leninist NDKT.

== Position and supporters ==
Headed by Mustafa Dzhemilev, the group defied long-established norms in the Crimean Tatar civil rights movement; unlike the NDKT, which held that the deportation and marginalization of Crimean Tatars was a revisionist deviation from proper Leninist values, the OKND was hostile towards communism and did not see restoration of the Crimean ASSR as a core component of national rehabilitation. As such, the group elicited support from the West and its members were championed by mainstream Soviet dissident groups. Many members of the modern Qurultay and Mejlis are former members of the OKND.
