= Romani people =

Romane manusha (Romani)
- Romani flag created in 1933 and accepted at the 1971 World Romani Congress

Total population
- 6–15.5 million

Regions with significant populations
- United States: 1 million estimated with Romani ancestry (Note: 5,400 per 2000 census.)
- Brazil: 800,000 (0.4%)
- Spain: 750,000–1.5 million (1.5–3.7%)
- Romania: 569,500–1.85 million (3.4–8.32%)
- Turkey: 500,000–2.75 million (0.57–3.2%)
- Bulgaria: 325,343 (Note: This is a census figure. Some 736,981 (10% of the population) did not declare any ethnicity. There was not any option for a person to declare multiple ethnicities. In a Bulgarian government report on the census, the ethnic results are identified as a "gross manipulation".)–750,000 (4.9–10.3%)
- Hungary: 309,632 (Note: This is a census figure. There was an option to declare multiple ethnicities, so this figure includes Roma of multiple backgrounds. According to the 2016 microcensus 99.1% of Hungarian Roma declared Hungarian ethnic identity also.)–870,000 (3.21–9%)
- France: 300,000–1.2 million (0.21%)
- Argentina: 300,000 (Note: Approximate estimate.)
- United Kingdom: 225,000 (0.4%)
- Russia: 205,007 (Note: This is a census figure.)–825,000 (0.6%)
- Serbia: 131,936 (0.2%) (Note: This is a census figure from 2022 (2% percent of the population). Some 136,198 (2.1% of the population) did not declare any ethnicity, with the unknown number 322,013, that in total makes 458,211 (or 6.9% of the population))
- Italy: 120,000–180,000 (0.3%)
- Greece: 111,000–300,000 (2.7%)
- Germany: 105,000 (0.1%)
- Slovakia: 105,738 (Note: This is a census figure. Some 408,777 (7.5% of the population) did not declare any ethnicity. There was not any option for a person to declare multiple ethnicities.)–490,000 (2.1–9%)
- Albania: 9,813 (2023 census)
- Iran: 2,000–110,000
- North Macedonia: 46,433 (2.53%)
- Sweden: 50,000–100,000
- Ukraine: 47,587 (Note: This is a census figure. Less than 1% of the population did not declare any ethnicity.)–260,000 (0.6%)
- Portugal: 52,000 (0.5%)
- Austria: 40,000–50,000 (0.6%)
- Kosovo: 36,000 (Note: This is a census figure including Romani, Ashkali and Balkan Egyptians.) (2%)
- Netherlands: 32,000–40,000 (0.2%)
- Poland: 17,049–32,500 (0.1%)
- Croatia: 16,975–35,000 (0.8%)
- Mexico: 15,850
- Chile: 15,000–20,000
- Finland: 10,000–12,000 est. (0.2%)
- Moldova: 9,323–20,000
- Bosnia and Herzegovina: 8,864–58,000 (1.5%)
- Colombia: 2,649–8,000
- Belarus: 7,316–47,500 (0.5%)
- Latvia: 7,193–12,500 (0.6%)
- Canada: 5,255–80,000
- Montenegro: 5,629
- Czech Republic: 5,199 (Note: This is a census figure. Some 25% of the population did not declare any ethnicity.)–40,370 (Romani speakers)–250,000 (1.9%)
- Australia: 5,000–25,000
- Slovenia: 3,246
- Lithuania: 2,571
- Denmark: 5,500
- Ireland: 22,435
- Georgia: 1,200
- Belgium: 30,000
- Cyprus: 1,250
- Switzerland: 25,000–35,000

Languages
- Romani (Para-Romani) · Official languages of native countries

Religion
- Christianity · Islam; Buddhism · Shaktism · Judaism (through marital conversions) · Romani mythology · Irreligion

Related ethnic groups
- Ghorbati · Doms · Lom · Ḍoma · Ashkali and Balkan Egyptians · Bede · other Indo-Aryan peoples

The Romani, also spelled Romany or Rromani (/ˈroʊməni/ ROH-mə-nee or /ˈrɒməni/ ROM-ə-nee), colloquially known as the Roma (sing.: Rom), are an Indo-Aryan ethnic group who traditionally led a nomadic, itinerant lifestyle. Linguistic and genetic evidence suggests that the Romani originated in northwestern regions of the Indian subcontinent. (Note: Attributed to multiple sources:) Their subsequent westward migration, possibly in waves, is now believed by historians to have occurred around 1000 CE. (Note: Attributed to multiple sources:) Their original name, derived from the Sanskrit डोम (doma), may refer to the Doma, a Dalit caste traditionally associated with musicians and dancers. The Romani population moved west into the Ghaznavid Empire and later into the Byzantine Empire. The Romani arrived in Europe around the 13th to 14th century, via the Balkans. Although they are dispersed, their most concentrated populations are in Europe, especially Central, Eastern, and Southern Europe, as well as West Asia (mainly Turkey and Iran).

In the English language, the Romani are widely known by the exonym Gypsies (or Gipsies), which is considered a pejorative by some Romani due to its connotations of illegality and irregularity, as well as its historical use as a racial slur. However, in the United Kingdom, the term Gypsies (or Romany Gypsies) is preferred by many of the Kale and Romanichal, and is used to refer to them in official documentation. The attendees of the first World Romani Congress in 1971 unanimously voted to reject the use of all exonyms for the Romani, including Gypsy. The exonym Tsigani and its variants are commonly used in Central and Eastern Europe, particularly in the Balkans. However, this term is also considered pejorative.

Since the 19th century, some Romani have migrated to the Americas. There are an estimated 1 million Romani in the United States and 800 thousand in Brazil, most of whose ancestors emigrated in the 19th century from Eastern Europe. Brazil also includes a notable Romani community descended from deportees from the Portuguese Empire during the Portuguese Inquisition. Since the late 19th century, Romani have migrated to other countries in South America and Canada. Though often confused with Irish Travellers and the Yenish people in Western Europe, the Romani are culturally different.

The Romani language is an Indo-Aryan language with strong Persian, Armenian, Greek, and South Slavic influence. Balkan Romani also shows an extensive Turkish influence. It is divided into several dialects, which together are estimated to have more than 2 million speakers. Because the language has traditionally been oral, many Romani are native speakers of the dominant language in their country of residence, or else of mixed languages combining the dominant language with a dialect of Romani in varieties sometimes called para-Romani.

== Names ==
The Romani people are known by a variety of names, mostly as Gypsies, Romani, Roma, Romanies, Tsinganoi, Bohémiens, with many variants. Numerous subgroups and clans self-designate, such as the Sinti, Kalderash, Boyash, Manouche, Lovari, Lăutari, Machvaya, Romanichal, Romanisael, Calé, Kale, Kaale, Xaladytka, Romungro, Ursari, and Sevlengere. In English, the word gypsy is most common.

In some regions, Roma is the primary term used in political contexts. Because all Romani use Romani as an adjective, Romani became an alternative noun. It is used by organizations such as the United Nations and the US Library of Congress. However, the World Roma Congress, the Council of Europe and other organizations prefer the term Roma, and recommend that Romani be used only as an adjective. The British government uses "Roma" as a sub-group of "White" in its ethnic classification system.

The English word Rom derives from Romani rom, meaning 'man, husband' (plural romá). Rom (with the plural Roma or Roms) and Romani (with the plural Romanies) are nouns and adjectives. Both Rom and Romani have been in use in English since the 19th century as an alternative for Gypsy. Romani is also spelled Romany, or Rommany. The terms Roma and Romanis are increasingly encountered as generic terms for the Romani people.

Rom's etymology is unclear. The Oxford English Dictionary says it likely derives from Sanskrit ḍomba, meaning 'lower-caste person working as a wandering musician', itself deriving from a Dravidian word, such as domba, ḍomba ('caste of acrobats, jugglers, clowns'). The standard assumption is that the demonyms of the Roma, Lom, and Dom, share the same origin.

Romani may serve as the feminine adjective and Romano as the masculine adjective. Some Romanies use Rom or Roma as an ethnic name, while others (such as the Sinti, or the Romanichal) do not.

Sometimes, Rom and Romani are spelled with a double r, i.e. Rrom and Rromani. In this case, Rr is used to represent the phoneme /ʀ/ (also written as ř and rh), which in some Romani dialects has remained distinct from the one written with a single r. The double r spelling is common in certain institutions (such as the INALCO Institute in Paris) or used in certain countries, e.g. Romania, to distinguish it from the endonym/homonym for Romanians (sg. român, pl. români).

In English, the exonym Gypsy (or Gipsy) is the most commonly used term. It originates from the Middle English gypcian, short for Egipcien. The Castilian term Gitano and the French Gitan have similar etymologies. They are ultimately derived from the Greek Aigyptioi (Αιγύπτιοι), meaning 'Egyptian', via Latin. This designation owes its existence to the belief, common in the Middle Ages, that the Roma, or some related group (such as the Indian Dom people), were itinerant Egyptians. Another designation is Cingane (alternatively Çingene, Tsinganoi, Zigar, Zigeuner, Tschingaren), likely deriving from the Persian word چنگانه (chingane), itself derived from the Turkic word çıgañ, meaning poor person. It is possible that the origin of this word is Athinganoi, the name of a Christian sect with whom the Roma (or some related group) could have become associated.

These exonyms may be written with a capital letter, to designate an ethnic group. While some Roma use the term, others consider it derogatory. (Note: Attributed to multiple sources:) The Council of Europe rejects the use of "Gypsy" and its variants, as well as administrative terms such as "Gens du Voyage". In Britain, many Roma proudly identify as "Gypsies", and, as part of the Gypsy/Roma/Traveller grouping, it is used to describe all para-Romani groups in official contexts. In North America, the word Gypsy is most commonly used as a reference to Romani ethnicity, though a nomadic lifestyle and fashion are also referenced using this word.

=== Other designations ===
Another designation of the Roma is Cingane (alternatively Çingene, Tsinganoi, Zigar, Zigeuner, Tschingaren), likely deriving from the Persian word چنگانه (chingane), itself derived from the Turkic word çıgañ, meaning poor person. It is also possible that the origin of this word is Athinganoi, the name of a Christian sect with whom the Roma (or some related group) could have become associated in the past.

== Demographics ==
=== Estimates ===
No official/reliable counts of Roma populations worldwide were available as of 2005. Many Roma refuse to register their ethnic identity in official censuses for reasons such as fear of discrimination.

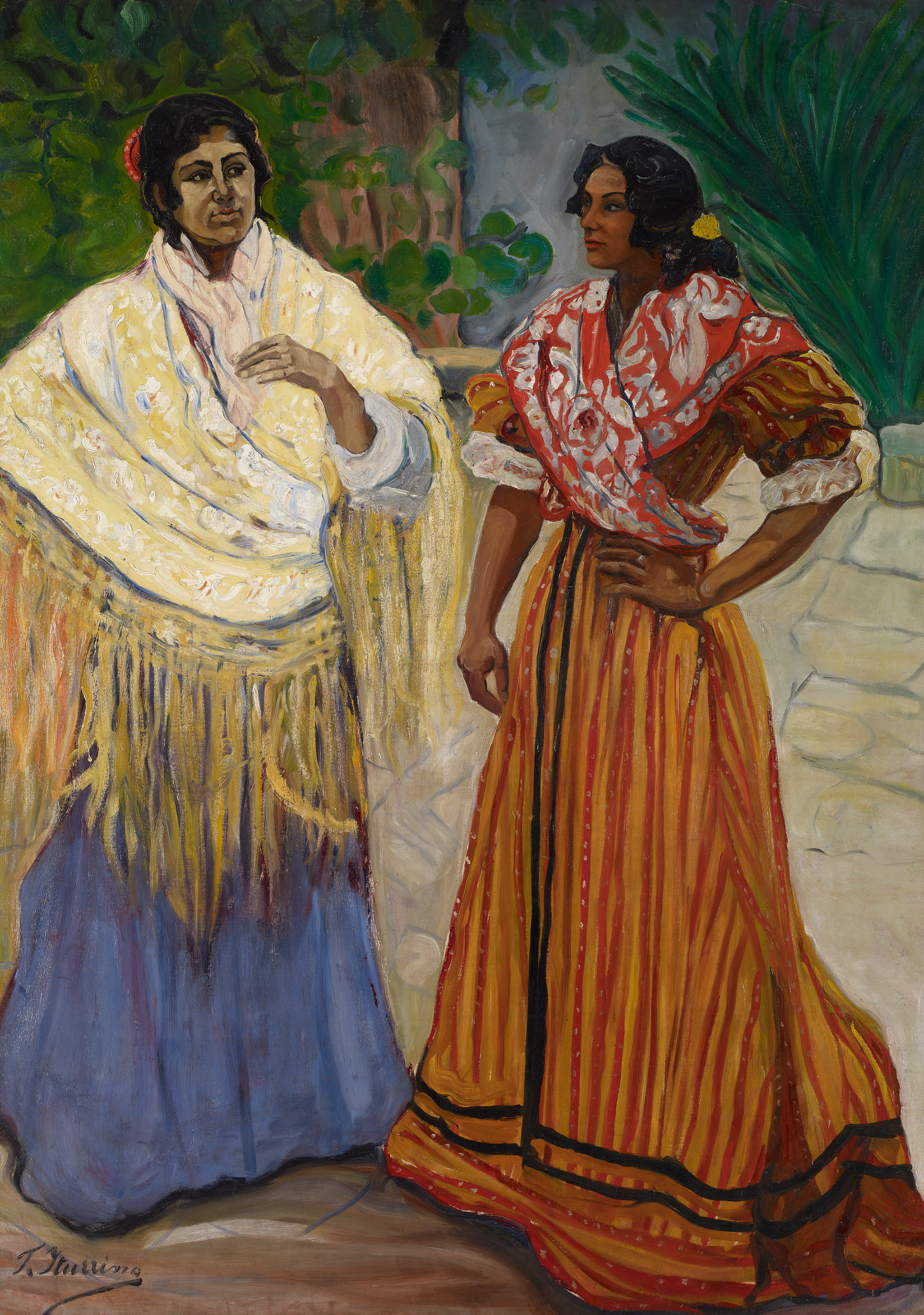
Two Gypsies by Francisco Iturrino

The European Romani population was estimated to be 10 million in Europe (as of 2019). Some Romani organizations gave earlier estimates as high as 14 million (2007). Significant Romani populations inhabit the Balkans and spread across Europe. In the European Union, an estimated 6 million Roma live (2019).

Outside Europe, several million more Roma may live, particularly in the Americas. Today, Turkey has the largest Romani population.

=== Subgroups ===
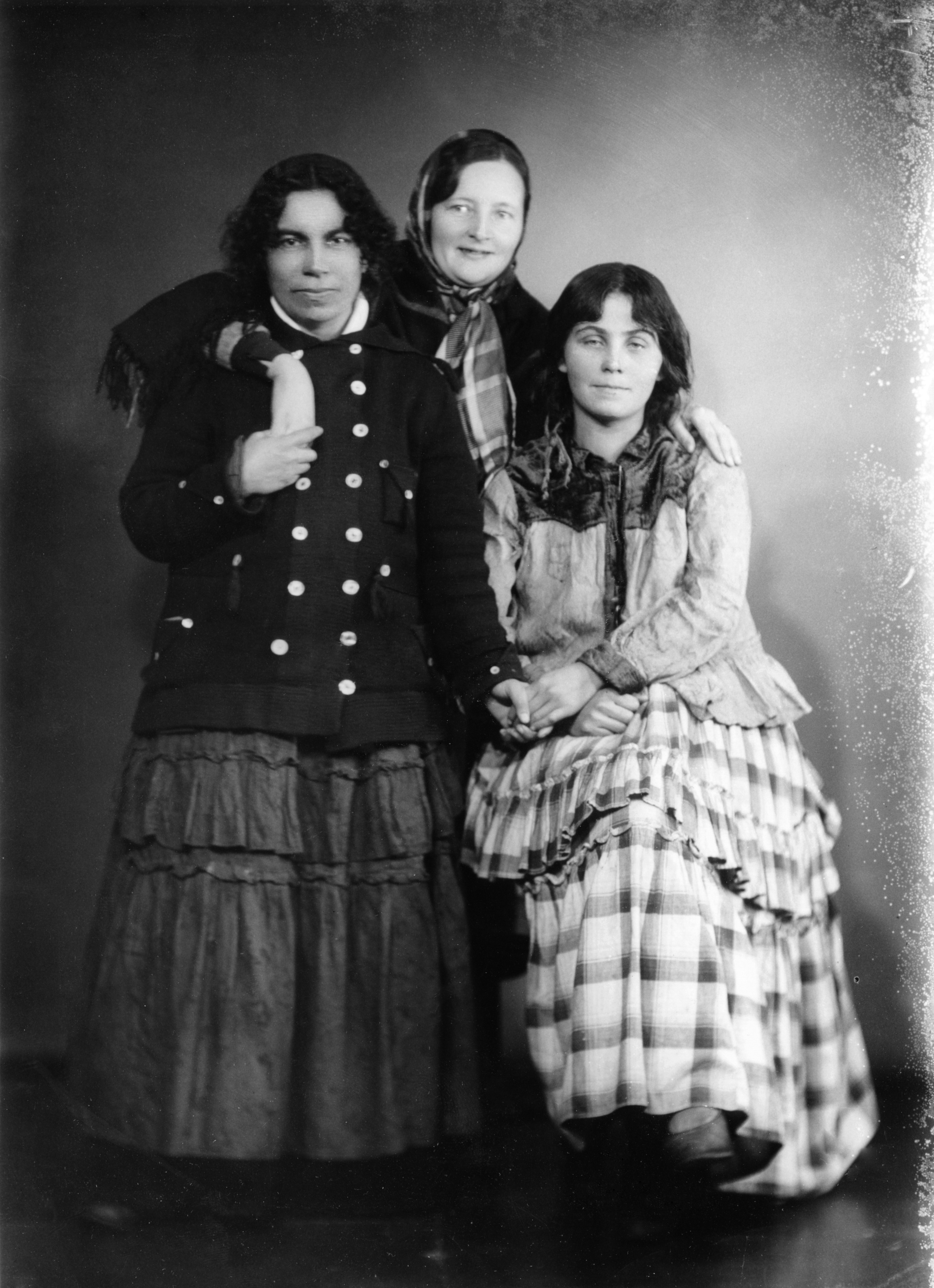
Kàlo Romani women in Helsinki, Finland, 1930s

Romani people may belong to distinct subgroups based in part on territorial, cultural and dialectal differences, as well as self-designation.

Romani subgroups may have more than one ethnonym. They may use more than one endonym and be commonly known by an exonym or by the endonym of another subgroup. The only name approaching an all-encompassing self-description is Rom. Even when subgroups do not use the name, they all acknowledge a common origin and a dichotomy between themselves and Gadjo (non-Roma). For instance, while the main group of Roma in German-speaking countries refer to themselves as Sinti, their name for their language is Romanes.

Subgroups have been described, in part, as a result of the castes and subcastes in India, which the founding population of Rom almost certainly experienced in their South Asian urheimat.

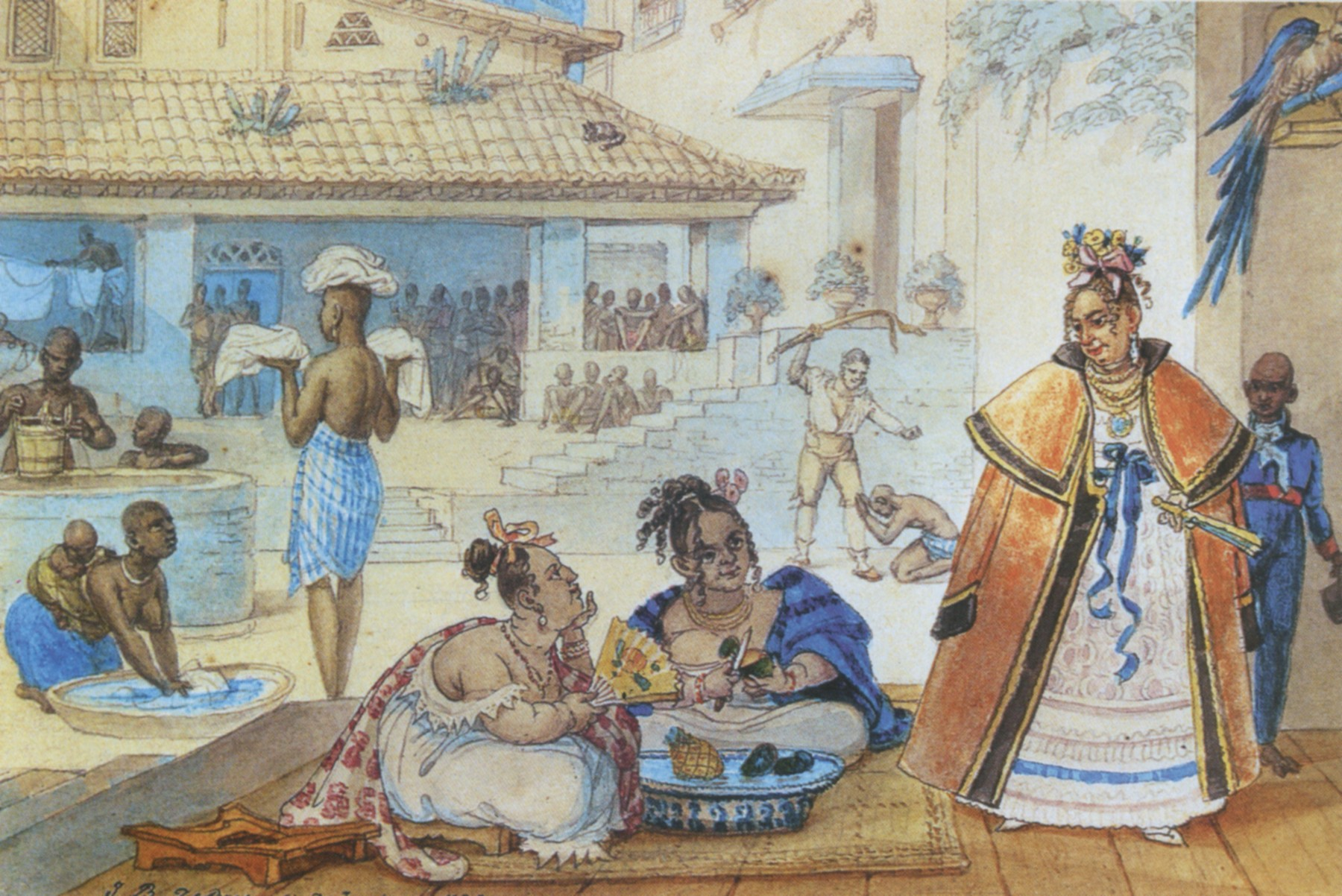
Jean-Baptiste Debret: Interior of a gipsy's house in Brazil (c. 1820)

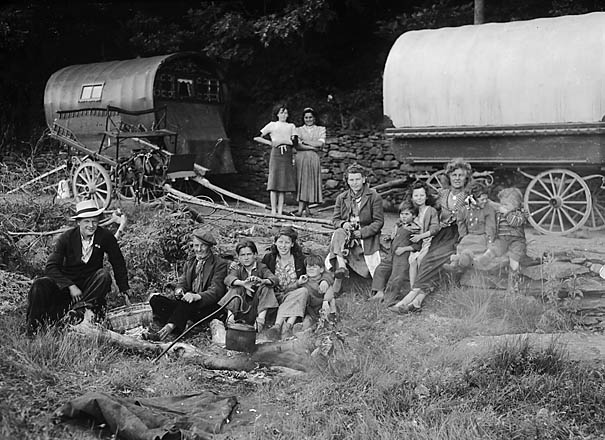
Gypsies camping. Kalé Roma near Swansea in Wales, 1953

Many subgroups use names derived from the Romani word kalo or calo, meaning "black" or "absorbing all light". This closely resembles words for "black" or "dark" in Indo-Aryan languages (e.g., Sanskrit काल kāla: "black", "of a dark color"). Likewise, the name of the Dom or Domba people of North India, with whom the Roma have genetic, cultural, and linguistic links, has come to imply "dark-skinned" in some Indian languages. Hence, names such as kale and calé may have originated as an exonym or euphemism for Roma.

While not a subgroup, Romani people often use the term Xoraxane to refer to Turkified or Muslim Romani people. During Ottoman times, the term Dasikane was used to refer to Christian Roma.

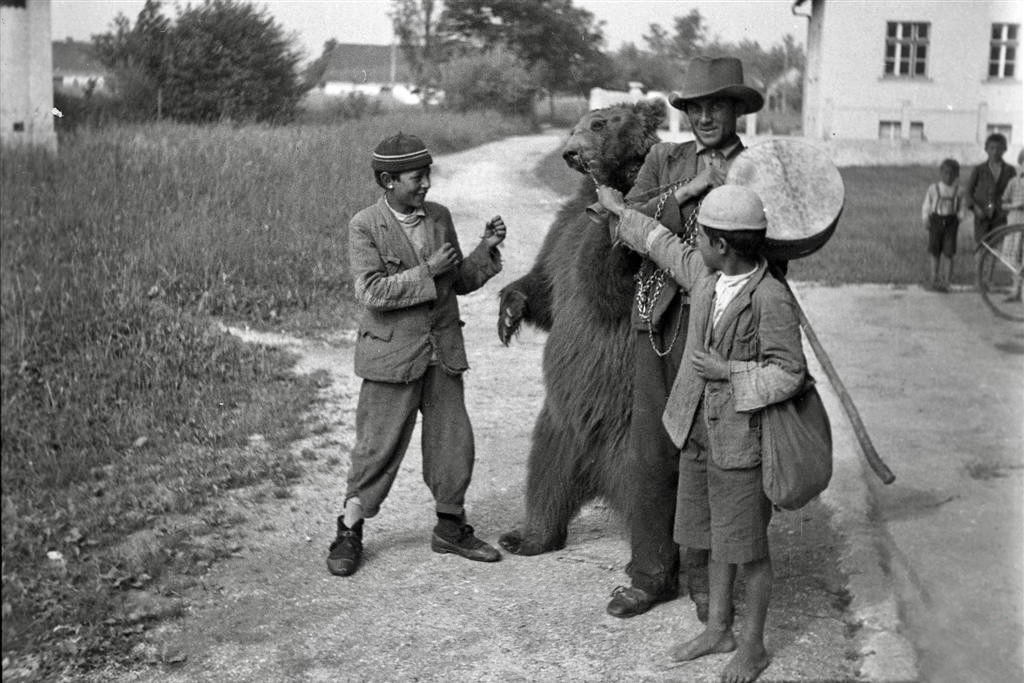
Ursari Roma in Šmarca, Slovenia, 1934

Other endonyms for Roma include:

- Arlije (also Erlides, Yerli, meaning "local", from the Turkish word Yerli) in the Balkans and Turkey to describe sedentary Muslim Roma
- Bashaldé – Hungarian-Slovak Roma diaspora in the US from the late 19th century
- Bergitka Roma (also Carpathian Roma), Poland, mainly Goral lands
- Çerge also Čergarja (nomad), Nomadic Lifestyle Muslim Roma in the Balkans and Turkey
- Calé, the endonym used by both the Spanish Roma (gitanos) and Portuguese Roma (ciganos). Caló is the language spoken by the Calé
- Gurbeti Muslim Roma in Northern Cyprus, Turkey and Balkans
- Kaale or Kàlo in Finland and Sweden
- Kā̊lē – the primary endonym used by the Romani subgroup in Wales, although Kalé is the most prominent orthography in academia (Note: The Welsh language alphabet lacks the letter k.) (Romanichal also live in Wales)
- Lalleri, from Austria, Germany, and western Czechia (including the former Sudetenland)
- Lovari, chiefly in Central Europe, formerly known as horse traders, whose name derives from the Hungarian word for horse
- Polska Roma, largest Romani subgroup in Poland
- Rom in Italy
- Roma in Romania, commonly known by ethnic Romanians as țigani, have a number of subgroups defined by occupation:
  - Argintari "silversmiths"
  - Aurari "goldsmiths"
  - Boyash, also known as Băieși, Lingurari, Ludar, Ludari, or Rudari, who coalesced in the Apuseni Mountains of Transylvania. Băieși is a Romanian word for "miners." Lingurari means "spoon makers", and Ludar (sing.), Ludari (pl.), and Rudari may mean "woodworkers" or "miners". (There is a semantic overlap due to the homophony or merging of lemmas with different meanings from at least two languages: the Serbian rudar "miner", and ruda "stick", "staff", "rod", "bar", "pole" (in Hungarian, rúd, and in Romanian, rudă)
  - Churari (from Romanian ciurari "sieve-makers")
  - Colari "carpet dealers"
  - Florari "flower-sellers"
  - Kalderash, from Romanian căldărar, literally "bucket-maker", meaning "kettle-maker", "tinsmith", "tinker"; also in Poland, Moldova and Ukraine
  - Lăutari "musicians" (lăută = lute)
  - Ungaritza (blacksmiths, bladesmiths)
  - Ursari ""dancing bears" trainers" (from Romanian urs "bear")
  - Zlătari "goldsmiths working with extracting and processing gold" (Not to be confused with Rudari miners)"
- Romové (or Roma), Czechia
- Rómovia (or Roma), Slovakia
- Romanichal, in the United Kingdom

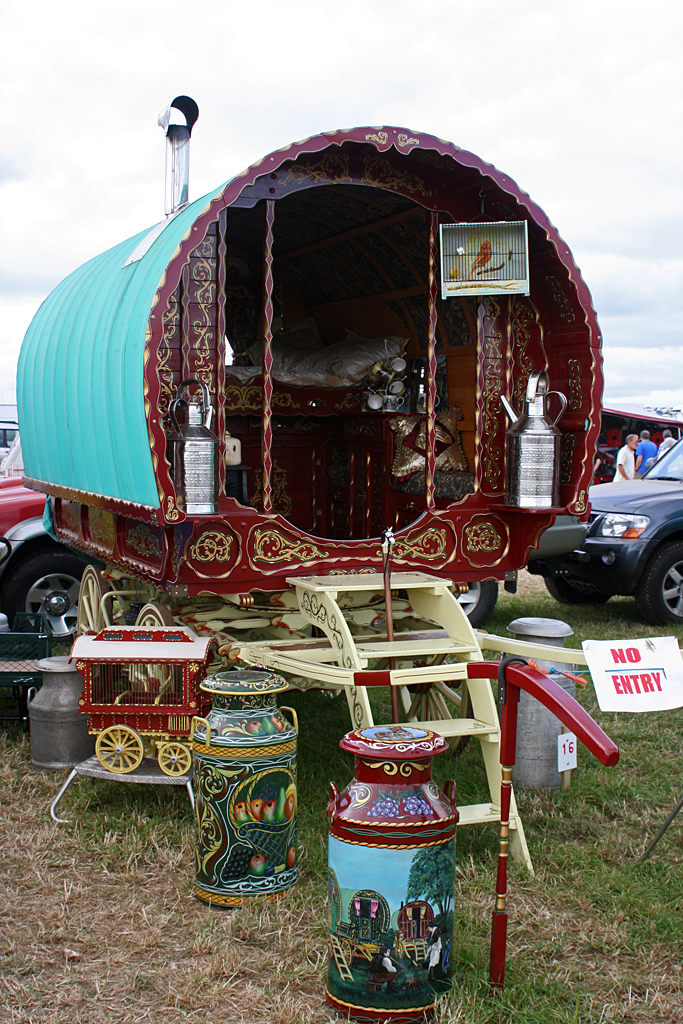
A Romanichal vardo pictured at the Great Dorset Steam Fair in 2007, England

- Romanisæl, in Norway and Sweden
- Romanlar, Turkish-speaking Muslim Roma in Turkey, also called Çingene or Şopar, with all subgroups, who are named after their professions, like:
  - Ayıcı (bear-leader)
  - Cambaz (acrobatics and horse trading)
  - Çiçekçi (flower-seller)
  - Demirci (blacksmith)
  - Kalaycı (tinsmith)
  - Kuyumcu (goldsmith)
  - Müzisyen (musician)
  - Sepetçi (basket-maker)
  - Subaşı (soldier or butler)
  - Sünnetçi (circumciser)
  - Şarkıcı (singer) etc., but the majority of Turkish Roma work as day laborers too
- Roms or Manouche (from manush, "people" in Romani) in France
- Romungro or Carpathian Roma from eastern Hungary and neighbouring parts of the Carpathians
- Sepečides, meaning "basket-maker"; Muslim Roma in West Thrace, Greece
- Sinti or Zinti, predominantly in Germany, and northern Italy
- Zargari, Muslim Roma in Iran, who once came from Rumelia/Southern Bulgaria from the Maritsa Valley in Ottoman times and settled in Persia

=== Diaspora ===
Countries with a significant Romani population according to unofficial estimates. + 1,000,000 + 100,000 + 10,000

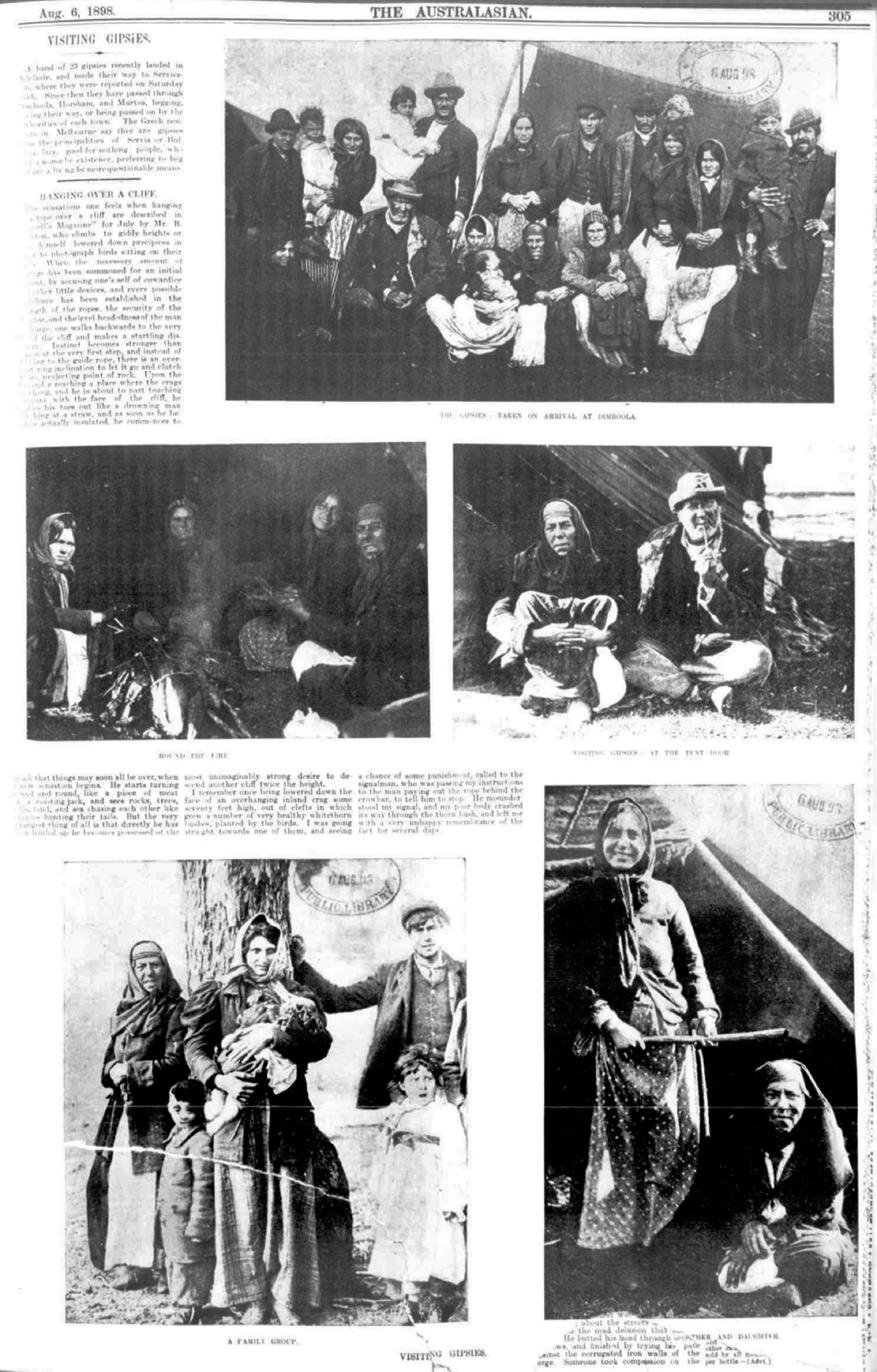
"Visiting Gipsies", article from Australian newspaper, The Australasian, 1898

Roma form distinct populations throughout Europe.

In the 19th century, Roma began migrating from Europe to the Americas. However, Romani slaves were first shipped to the Americas with Columbus in 1498. Spain sent Romani slaves to its Louisiana colony between 1762 and 1800. An Afro-Romani community exists in St. Martin Parish due to intermarriage between freed African American and Romani slaves.

In Brazil, the Roma are mainly called ciganos by the non-Romani population. Most of them belong to the Calés (Kale) subgroup. Juscelino Kubitschek, Brazil's president from 1956 to 1961, was 50% Romani via his mother'. Washington Luís, the last president of the First Brazilian Republic (1926–1930), had Romani ancestry.

The US Romani population is estimated at more than one million. (Note: "Today, estimates put the number of Roma in the U.S. at about one million.") Between 800,000 and 1 million Roma live in Brazil, most of whose ancestors immigrated in the 19th century. Brazilian Roma are mostly descended from German and Italian Sinti (in the South and Southeast regions) and from Roma and Calon people. Brazil also includes a notable Romani community descended from Sinti and Roma deportees from the Portuguese Empire during the Portuguese Inquisition.

Persecution led many Roma cultural practices to be extinguished, hidden, or modified to survive in places that excluded them. The widespread carnivals throughout Brazil are one of the few spaces in which the Roma can express their cultural traditions, including the so-called "carnival wedding" in which a boy is disguised as a bride, and the "Romaní dance", presented by women parading in their traditional attire.

== Origin ==
Genetics reveal that the ancestors of the Romani people originated in the northwestern regions of South Asia, particularly in present-day Punjab, Rajasthan, and Sindh. Because Romani groups did not chronicle their history or maintain oral accounts, most hypotheses about early Roma are based on linguistic data.

=== Shahnameh legend ===
According to a legend reported in the Persian epic poem, the Shahnameh, the Sasanian king Bahrām V Gōr learned toward the end of his reign (421–439) that the poor could not afford to enjoy music, and so he asked the king of India to send him ten thousand luris, expert lute-players. When the luris arrived, Bahrām gave each one an ox, a donkey, and a donkey-load of wheat so they could live on agriculture and play music for the poor. However, the luris ate the oxen and the wheat and returned a year later with their cheeks hollowed by hunger. The king, angered by their having wasted his gifts, ordered them to wander the world on their donkeys.

=== Linguistic evidence ===
Linguistic evidence showed that the roots of the Romani language lie in India: the language has grammatical characteristics of Indian languages, and a large part of its lexicon shares that root.

Romani and Domari share some agglutination of second-layer postpositions (or case-marking clitics) to the nominal stem, concord markers for the past tense, neutralization of gender marking in the plural, and use of the oblique case as an accusative. This prompted discussion about the relationship between the languages. Domari was once thought to be a "sister language" of Romani, with the two languages splitting after leaving the Indian subcontinent. Later research suggests that the differences between them are significant enough to treat them as separate branches within the central zone language group. The Dom and the Rom, therefore, likely descend from two waves of migration separated by several centuries.

The Romani migration hypothesis is supported by several lines of evidence. The Romani language features a unique blend of words found in modern Indian dialects, including many military-related terms. Genetic studies reinforce this theory by revealing a link between Romani populations and specific communities (castes) in northern India, such as the upper-caste Jats and Rajputs.

In phonology, the Romani language shares isoglosses with the Central branch of Indo-Aryan languages, especially in the realization of some sounds of Old Indo-Aryan. However, it preserves several dental clusters. In regards to verb morphology, Romani follows the same pattern of northwestern languages such as Kashmiri and Shina through the adoption of oblique enclitic pronouns as person markers, lending credence to the theory of their Central Indian origin and migration to northwestern India. Although the retention of dental clusters suggests a break from central languages during the transition from Old to Middle Indo-Aryan, the overall morphology suggests that the language participated in some of the significant developments leading toward the emergence of New Indo-Aryan languages.

=== Genetic evidence ===
Genetic findings published in 2012 suggest that the Roma originated in northwestern India and migrated as a group. According to the study, the ancestors of present-day scheduled caste and scheduled tribe populations of northern India, traditionally referred to collectively as the Ḍoma, are the likely ancestral populations of European Roma. However, scholars such as Ian Hancock speculated that they could have originated from high-caste groups such as Jats and Rajputs.

Also in 2012, another study reported that the "Roma came from a single group that left northwestern India about 1,500 years ago". According to the study, they reached the Balkans about 900 years ago and subsequently spread throughout Europe. The team also found that the Roma displayed genetic isolation, as well as "differential gene flow in time and space with non-Romani Europeans".

Genetic research reported that "over 70% of males belong to a single lineage that appears unique to the Roma".

Genetic evidence dates the migration from India to medieval times. The Roma were described as "a conglomerate of genetically isolated founder populations", while common Mendelian disorders among Roma indicates "a common origin and founder effect". A 2020 whole-genome study reported the northern Indian origins, and substantial Balkan and Middle Eastern ancestry amongst Roma in Central and Eastern Europe. The study also included a sample of Roma from Spain and Lithuania, with significantly greater European ancestry.

A 2001 study reported "a limited number of related founders, compatible with a small group of migrants splitting from a distinct caste or tribal group". The same study reported that "a single lineage... found across Romani populations, accounts for almost one-third of Romani males". A 2004 study of Roma in Central and Eastern Europe and Spain. concluded that the Romani population "was founded approximately 32–40 generations ago, with secondary and tertiary founder events occurring approximately 16–25 generations ago".

Haplogroup H-M82 is a major lineage cluster among Balkan Roma, accounting for approximately 60% of the total. Haplogroup H is uncommon in Europe, but is present in the Indian subcontinent.

A study of 444 people representing three ethnic groups in North Macedonia found that mtDNA haplogroups M5a1 and H7a1a were dominant among Roma (13.7% and 10.3%, respectively).

Y-DNA composition of Muslim Roma from Šuto Orizari Municipality in North Macedonia, based on 57 samples:

- Haplogroup H – 59.6%
- Haplogroup E – 29.8%
- Haplogroup I – 5.3%
- Haplogroup R – 3.0%, of which half are R1b and many are R1a
- Haplogroup G – 1.8%

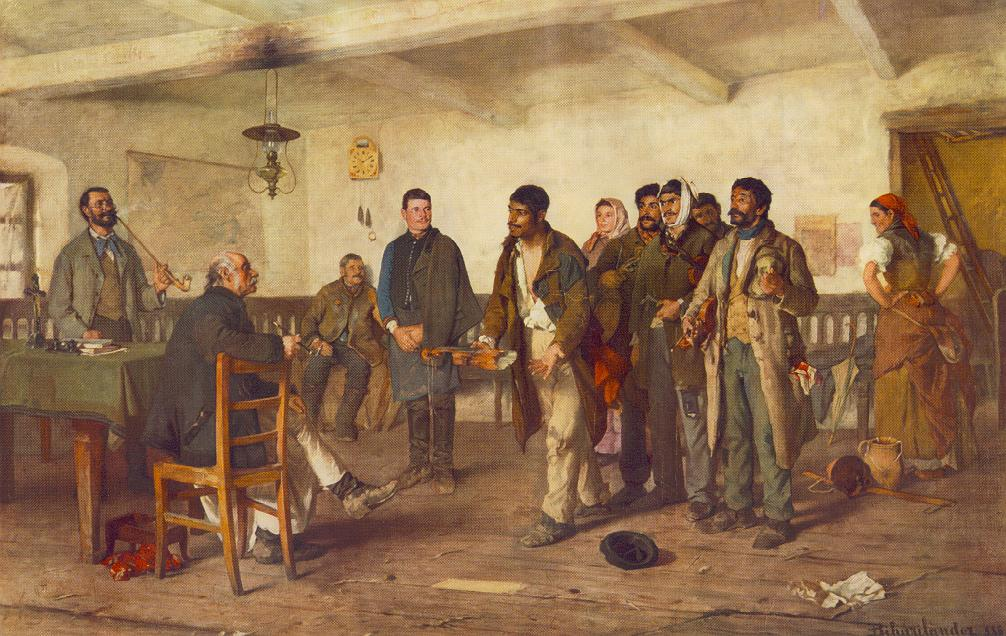
A Rom makes a complaint to a local magistrate in Hungary, by Sándor Bihari, 1886

Y-DNA Haplogroup H1a occurs in Roma at 7-70% frequencies. Unlike ethnic Hungarians, Hungarian and Slovak Roma subpopulations typically exhibit Haplogroup E-M78 and I1 at frequencies above 10% and sometimes above 20%, while the dominant haplogroup among Slovak and Tiszavasvari Roma is H1a; among Tokaj Roma, it is Haplogroup J2a (23%); and among Taktaharkány Roma, it is Haplogroup I2a (21%).

Five relatively consistent founder lineages were reported among Roma subpopulations: J-M67 and J-M92 (J2), H-M52 (H1a1), and I-P259 (I1). Haplogroup I-P259, as H, is not found at frequencies above 3% among host populations, while haplogroups E and I are absent in South Asia. The lineages E-V13, I-P37 (I2a), and R-M17 (R1a) may represent gene flow from the host populations. Bulgarian, Romanian, and Greek Roma are dominated by Haplogroup H-M82 (H1a1), while J2 is prevalent among Spanish Roma. In Serbia, Haplogroup H prevails among Kosovo and Belgrade Roma, while among Vojvodina Roma, H drops to 7% and E-V13 becomes the dominant haplogroup.

Among non-Roma Europeans, Haplogroup H is rare, peaking at 7% among Albanians from Tirana and 11% among Bulgarian Turks. The Ottoman occupation of the Balkans left a significant genetic mark on the Y-DNA of the Roma there, resulting in a higher frequency of Haplogroups J and E3b in Romani populations from the region.

==== Full genome analysis ====
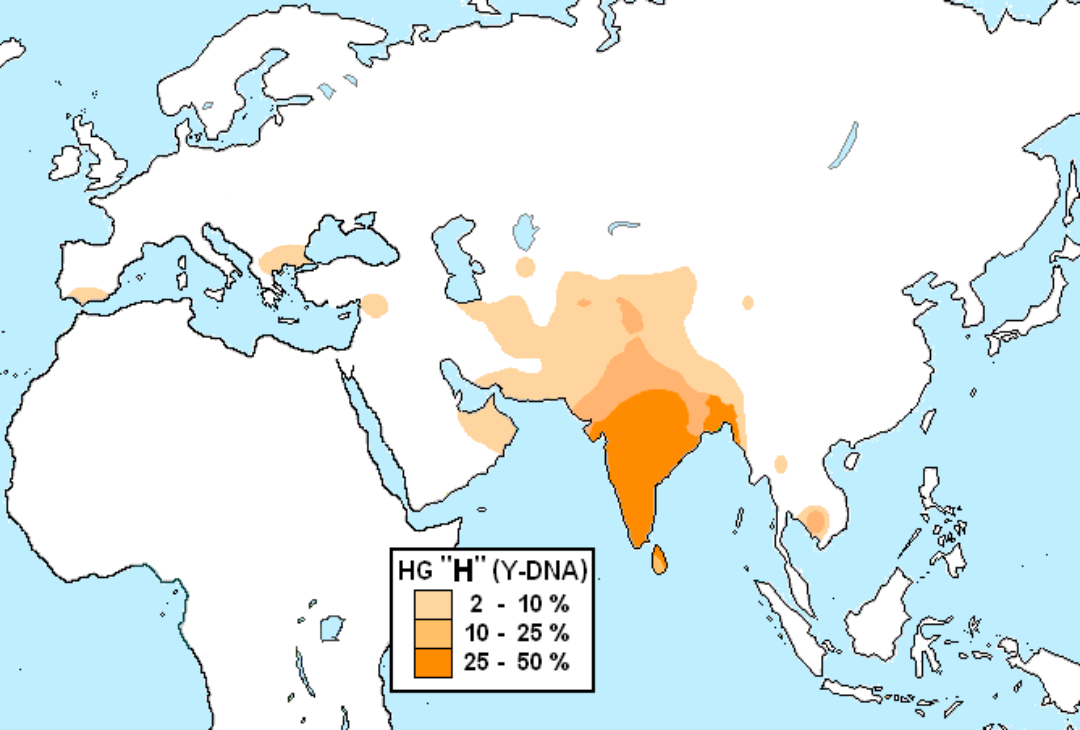
The most common paternal haplogroup among Roma is the South Asian Y-chromosome H, most commonly found among Dravidian peoples.

A 2019 full-genome autosomal DNA study on 186 Roma samples from southeastern, northeastern, and southwestern Europe reported that modern Romani people in these areas are characterized by a common South Asian origin and a complex admixture of Middle Eastern, Caucasus, Balkan, and broader European-derived ancestries. Earlier admixture dates among Roma in the Balkans support that they migrated into Europe via the Balkans. The autosomal genetic data links the proto-Roma to groups in northwest India (specifically Punjabi and Gujarati samples), as well as Dravidian-speaking groups in southeastern India (specifically the Irula). The paternal lineages of Roma are most common among Dravidian-speaking populations in southern and central India. The authors argue that this may point to a founder effect among the early Roma during their ethnogenesis or shortly after their migration out of the Indian subcontinent. It is theorized that the ancestors of the Romani people may have had a low-caste origin, since they were genetically closer to the Punjabi cluster that lacks a common marker characteristic of high castes: West Eurasian admixing.

=== Possible migration route ===
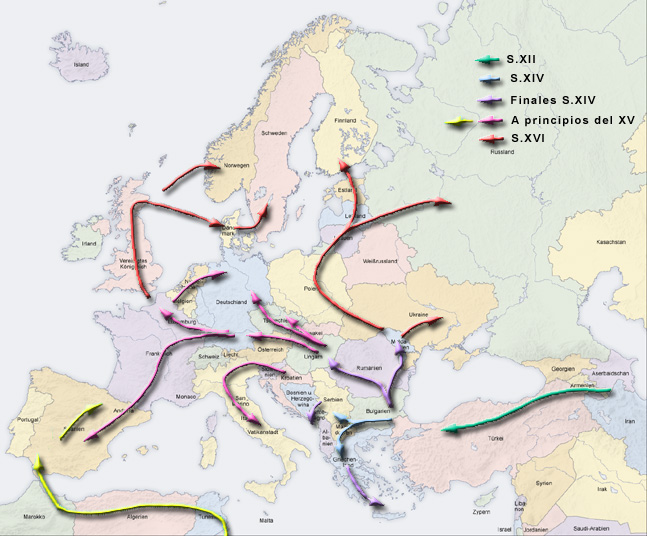
The migration of the Romanies into and through Europe

Romani ancestors may have emerged from what became Rajasthan and migrated northwest to what became Punjab around 250 BCE. Their subsequent westward migration, possibly in waves, was dated around 500 CE. The migration may have taken place in the context of the raids of Mahmud of Ghazni. As these soldiers were defeated, they moved westward with their families into the Byzantine Empire. A central Indian origin for Romani followed by a migration to northwest India, is supported by ancient isoglosses with Central Indo-Aryan languages in the realization of some Old Indo-Aryan sounds. This is further supported by its sharing patterns with northwestern languages such as Kashmiri and Shina through the adoption of oblique enclitic pronouns as person markers. The overall morphology suggests that Romani participated in some of the developments leading to the emergence of New Indo-Aryan languages, thus indicating that the proto-Roma did not leave the Indian subcontinent until the late second half of the first millennium.

Armenian-origin words in the Romani language indicate that Roma passed through Armenia before the linguistic changes of the 9th century. They arrived in the Balkans, and thus in Europe proper, during the Byzantine period.

== Ethnic identities conflated with the Roma ==
Romani people have a long history of adopting other ethnic identities or getting labeled as members of other ethnic groups.

=== Indian diaspora ===
In March 1976, the International Roma Cultural Festival in Chandigarh, India, received the support of then-Prime Minister Indira Gandhi, who referred to the Roma as part of the global Indian diaspora. In February 2016, during the International Roma Conference, then Indian Minister of External Affairs Sushma Swaraj stated that the Roma are the "children of India". Advocates who took part, including Jovan Damjanovic, president of the World Roma Organisation (Rromanipen), argued that recognition could provide the Roma with cultural affirmation, a stronger sense of belonging, and potential access to support from Indian institutions while symbolically addressing centuries of marginalization. Damjanovic stated that if India were to accept this proposal, it would mark the first step toward countering negative perceptions surrounding the Roma and that this could provide India with cultural, economic, and political benefits. The conference ended with a recommendation to the Government of India to recognize the Romani community as a part of the Indian diaspora. Following that event, a starred question was raised in the Lok Sabha concerning whether the Roma constituted part of the diaspora and whether any official study had been proposed to trace their origins. The Ministry of External Affairs replied that the purpose of the conference was to revive cultural and linguistic ties, assess scholarship, and encourage research, not to grant formal recognition.

In April 2022, an international conference revisited the issue. The event, supported by the Indian Council for Cultural Relations, examined whether the Roma could be recognized. Speakers emphasized the connections from the Roma to India and the community's desire for recognition while noting the complexities arising from centuries of displacement and marginalization. The conference underscored the ongoing need to consider formal recognition.

A 2007 article argued that the Romani people's Indian origin is of more than historical/academic interest and that acknowledging this connection is essential for the "political legitimacy and security" of the Romani people. Establishing a verifiable historical and genetic link to a specific place of origin would allow the Romani people to counter the "fictitious history" often imposed on them. This connection provides a basis for seeking Indian government support, which is instrumental in symbolically acknowledging them as an Indian population outside of India. This recognition supports Romani leaders in their struggle for representation in forums such as the United Nations, thereby enhancing their political standing and providing a measure of security.

=== Romaei/Eastern Romans ===
As the Roma fled the Muslim conquests of Mahmud of Ghazni in Northern India during the early 11th century, they arrived in the Eastern Roman (Byzantine) Empire by the 12th century.

=== Athinganoi ===
In the Byzantine Empire, the Roma took on the identity of the Athinganoi (Greek: Αθίγγανοι). They were a Manichaean sect regarded as Judaizing heretics who lived in Phrygia and Lycaonia, but were neither Hebrews nor Gentiles. They kept Sabbath but were not circumcised. They were Shomer nagia. The word "Athiganoi" is the origin of the Turkish name Ciganos as well as the Romanian name țigani, as the Ottoman Empire had linguistic and cultural influence on the neighbouring Romanian principalities of Wallachia and Moldavia. The Ottoman Turks conquered the Byzantine Empire in the 15th century; consequently, they ruled over the Roma (Ciganos).

=== Egyptians ===
Some terms for the Romani people point to Egyptians. The English term Gypsy (or Gipsy) originates from the Middle English gypcian, short for Egipcien. The Spanish term Gitano and French Gitan have similar etymologies. They are ultimately derived from the Greek Αιγύπτιοι (Aigyptioi), meaning "Egyptian", via Latin. This designation owes its existence to the belief, common in the Middle Ages, that the Roma, or some related group (such as the Indian Dom people), were itinerant Egyptians.

=== Bohemians ===
The Roma from Bohemia (later a part of Czechia) were called Bohemians because they were believed to have originated in Bohemia and came later to Western European countries such as France in the 16th century. The term bohemian came to refer to carefree, artistic people. The Roma were musicians, dancers, and circus performers who moved from place to place, leading a nomadic lifestyle away from society's conventional norms and expectations. This lifestyle inspired the 19th-century European artistic movement Bohemianism, as well as the hippie movement of the 1950s and 1960s in the United States.

=== Irish Travellers ===
Because Irish Travellers, a subgroup of the Irish (having the same ancestral genetics as the general population of Ireland), lived as nomads, the Roma and the Irish Travellers came to be conflated with each other.

=== Yenish people ===
Similar to Irish Travellers, the Yenish people were confused with the Roma because they were nomadic and itinerant. The Yenish originated in Western Europe, primarily in Germany, Austria, Switzerland, Luxembourg, and Belgium. The Yenish descended from members of marginalized/vagrant classes of society in Germanic-speaking regions in Europe during the Late Middle Ages. Most of the Yenish became sedentary during the mid-19th to 20th centuries. Their cultures remained distinct despite sharing nomadic and itinerant lifestyles.

=== Balkan people ===
Forced sterilization carried out in several European countries, such as Norway, Sweden, Czechia, and Slovakia, in the mid- to late 20th century and led to decreased Roma populations in those countries. Countries in Southeastern Europe that had not forced sterilization, such as Romania and Bulgaria, experienced steady increases of Roma birth rates during the 20th and 21st centuries, mainly because of the Roma tradition of marrying in their early teens. Once communism fell in Eastern Europe, travel restrictions were lifted, and Eastern European countries joined the European Union, it was easier for Eastern European Roma to migrate to Western Europe. Often, Romania is wrongly identified as the place of origin of the Roma because of their similar names. Romanians derive their name from the Latin romanus, meaning "Roman". This refers to the Roman conquest of Dacia, whose inhabitants, the Dacians, were a sub-group of the Thracians.

In parts of the Balkans, particularly in Bulgaria, some people of Romani descent identify as ethnic Turks, and over generations have adopted the Turkish language.

== History ==
=== Arrival in Europe ===
A number of Armenian-origin words in the Romani language indicate that Roma passed through Armenia prior to linguistic 9th century changes. They arrived in the Balkans—Europe proper—during the Byzantine period. A 1068 document describing an event in Constantinople mentions "Atsingani", probably referring to Roma. They likely reached the Balkans in the 12th century, although some records support arrival as early as the 7th century.

Later historical records of the Roma in the Balkans date to the 14th century: in 1322, after leaving Ireland on a pilgrimage to Jerusalem, Irish Franciscan friar Symon Semeonis encountered Romani migrants outside Candia (modern Heraklion), in Crete, calling them "the descendants of Cain"; his account is the earliest surviving description by a western chronicler of Roma in Europe.

In 1350, Ludolph of Saxony mentioned a people with a unique language whom he called Mandapolos, a word possibly derived from the Greek word mantes (meaning prophet or fortune teller).

In the 14th century, Roma are recorded in Venetian territories, including Methoni and Nafplio in the Peloponnese, and Corfu. Around 1360, a fiefdom called the Feudum Acinganorum was established in Corfu, which mainly used Romani serfs and to which the Roma on the island were subservient.

With the decline of the Byzantine Empire, the Ottoman Empire began expanding into Europe during the second half of the 14th century. Fleeing Ottoman wars, Romani people began migrating to western Europe during the 15th and 16th centuries. They often travelled as pilgrims, in organised groups of between 40 and 200 people. By the 16th century, they were present throughout western and northern Europe.

By the 1440s, they were recorded in Germany; and by the 16th century, Scotland and Sweden. Some Gitanos are thought to have migrated from Persia through north Africa, reaching the Iberian Peninsula in the 15th century.

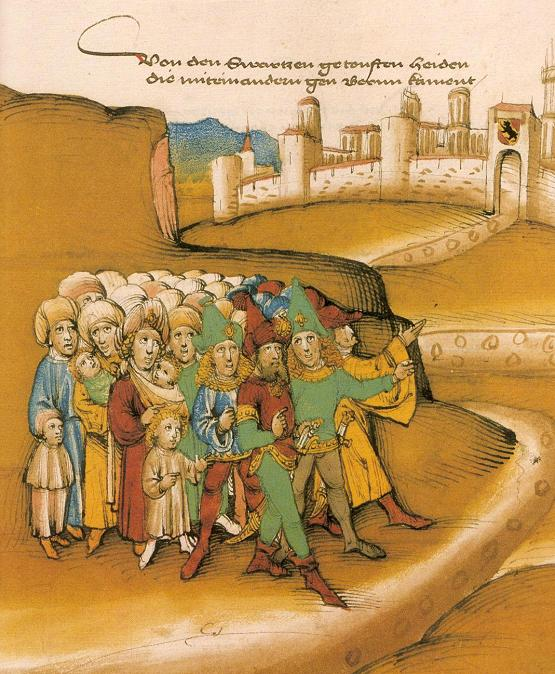
First arrival of the Romanies outside Bern in the 15th century, described by the chronicler as getoufte heiden ("baptized heathens") and wearing Saracen-style clothing and weapons.

=== Early modern history ===
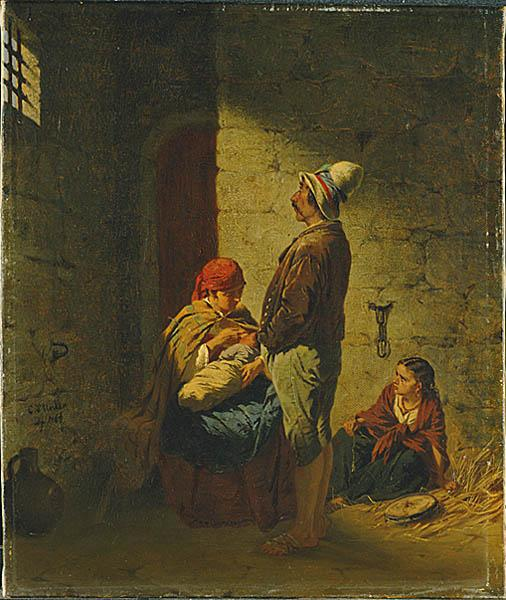
Gypsy Family in Prison, 1864 painting by Carl d'Unker. An actual imprisoned family in Germany served as the models. The reason for their imprisonment remains unknown.

Their early presence met a mixed reception. Although 1385 marks the first recorded transaction for a Romani slave in Wallachia, they were issued safe conduct by Holy Roman Emperor Sigismund in 1417. Roma were ordered expelled from the Meissen region of Germany in 1416, Lucerne in 1471, Milan in 1493, France in 1504, Catalonia in 1512, Sweden in 1525, England in 1530 (see Egyptians Act 1530), and Denmark in 1536. From 1510 onwards, any Roma found in Switzerland was to be executed, while in England (beginning in 1554) and Denmark (beginning of 1589) Roma who did not leave within a month were to be executed. Portugal began deportations of Roma to its colonies in 1538.

A 1596 English statute gave Roma privileges that other wanderers lacked. France passed a similar law in 1683. Catherine the Great of Russia declared the Roma "crown slaves" (a status superior to serfs), but also kept them out of certain parts of the capital. In 1595, Ștefan Răzvan overcame his birth into slavery, and became the Voivode (Prince) of Moldavia.

Since a royal edict by Charles II in 1695, Romanis in Spain had been restricted to certain towns. An official edict in 1717 restricted them to 75 towns and districts, so that they would not concentrate. During the latter part of the 17th century, around the Franco-Dutch War, both France and the Dutch Republic needed thousands of men to fight. Some recruitment took the form of rounding up vagrants and the poor to work the galleys and provide the armies' labour force. With this background, Roma were targets of both the French and the Dutch.

Into the first decade of the 18th century, Roma were slaughtered with impunity throughout the Dutch Republic. Roma, called 'heiden' ('heathens') by the Dutch, wandered throughout the rural areas of Europe and became the societal pariahs of the age. In the Great Gypsy Round-up, Roma were arrested and imprisoned by the Spanish Monarchy in 1749. Heidenjachten, translated as "heathen hunt" happened throughout the Dutch Republic in an attempt to eradicate them.

Although some Roma were kept as slaves in Wallachia and Moldavia until abolition in 1856, the majority traveled in wagons as free nomads, as reflected in the spoked wheel symbol in the Romani flag. Elsewhere in Europe, they were subjected to ethnic cleansing, abduction of their children, and forced labour. In Britain, Roma were sometimes expelled from small communities or hanged; in France, they were branded, and their heads were shaved; in Moravia and Bohemia, the women were distinguished by their severed ears. As a result, large groups of the Roma moved East, toward Poland, which was more tolerant, and Russia, where the Roma were treated more fairly as long as they paid taxes.

=== Modern history ===
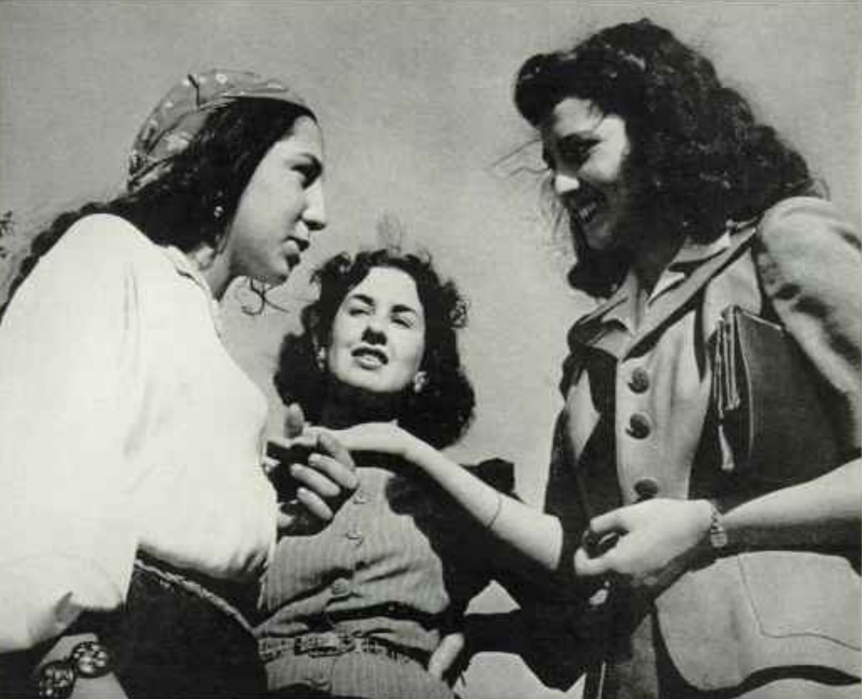
Romani woman conducting a palm reading in Chile, 1944

Roma began emigrating to colonial North America, with small groups recorded in Virginia and French Louisiana. Larger-scale Roma emigration began in the 1860s, with Romanichal groups from Great Britain. The most significant number immigrated in the early 20th century, mainly from the Vlax group of Kalderash. Many Roma settled in South America.

The flag of Kosovo, adopted on February 17, 2008, includes one white star (of six) that symbolizes the Romani people, alongside Albanians, Serbs, Bosniaks, Turks, and Gorani.

==== World War II ====
Austrian politician and dictator Adolf Hitler enacted a law targeting Jews, Romani people, Black people, homosexuals, and others, which included the phrase "lives undeserving of life," just four months after he became Chancellor of Germany.

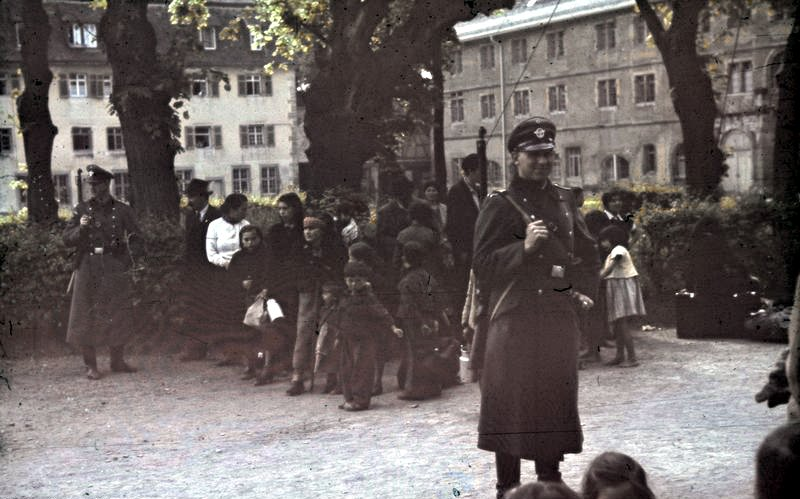
Sinti and other Roma about to be deported from Germany, 22 May 1940

During World War II and the Holocaust, the Nazis committed genocide against the Roma. In the Romani language, this genocide is known as the Porajmos. Roma were marked for extermination and sentenced to forced labor and imprisonment in Zigeunerlager ("Gypsy camps") and concentration camps. They were often killed on sight, especially by the Einsatzgruppen (paramilitary death squads) on the Eastern Front. The number of victims has been estimated at between 220,000 and 1,500,000.

The Roma were also persecuted in Nazi puppet states. In the Independent State of Croatia, the Ustaša almost killed the entire Romani population of 25,000. The concentration camp system of Jasenovac, run by the Ustaša militia and the Croat political police, was responsible for the deaths of between 15,000 and 20,000 Roma.

==== Post-1945 ====
In Czechoslovakia, they were labeled a "socially degraded stratum", and Romani women were sterilized as part of a state policy to reduce their population. This policy was implemented with large financial incentives, with threats of denying future welfare payments, with misinformation, or after administering drugs.

An official inquiry from Czechia, resulting in a report (December 2005), concluded that the Communist authorities had practiced an assimilation policy towards Roma, which "included efforts by social services to control the birth rate in the Romani community. The problem of sexual sterilization carried out in Czechia, either with improper motivation or illegally, exists," said the Czech Public Defender of Rights, recommending state compensation for women affected between 1973 and 1991. New cases were revealed until 2004, in both Czechia and Slovakia. Germany, Norway, Sweden and Switzerland "all have histories of coercive sterilization of minorities and other groups".

== Culture ==
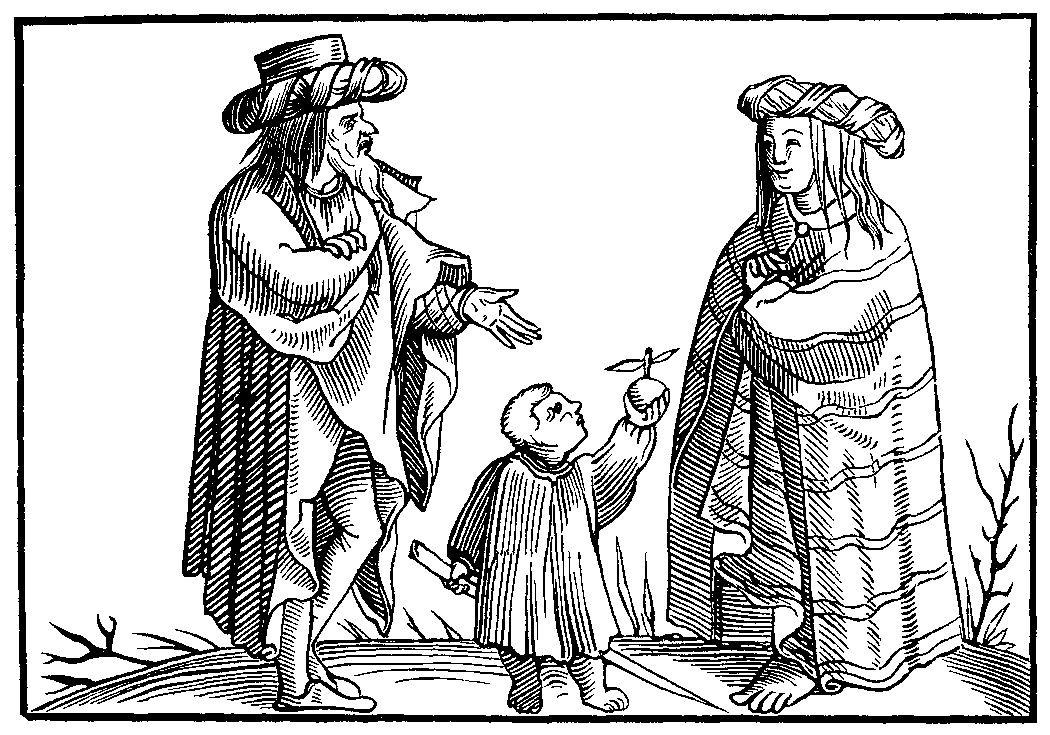
Münster, Sebastian (1552), "A Gipsy Family", The Cosmographia (facsimile of a woodcut), Basle

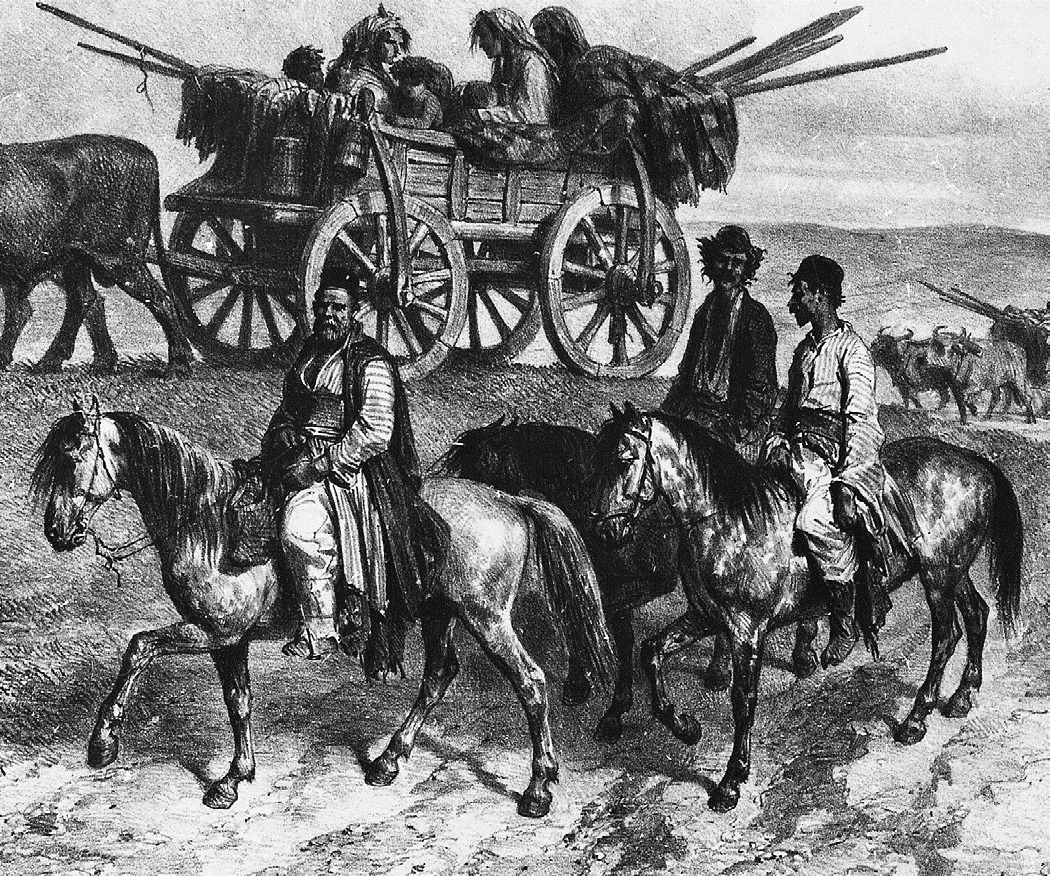
Nomadic Romani family travelling in Moldavia, 1837

Traditional Romanis place a high value on the extended family. Traditionally, virginity is essential in unmarried women. Eastern European Romanis are more likely to find it acceptable for girls to have sex before marriage versus other Eastern Europeans. Roma usually marry young; the Romani practice of child marriage created controversy in several countries. Romani law amongst some Roma, particularly the Kalaidzhi, establishes that the man's family must pay a bride price to the bride's parents, but only traditional families still follow it.

Once married, the woman joins the husband's family, where her role is to tend to her husband and her children and care for her in-laws. In the traditional Romani household the oldest man or grandfather is head of the household, while men have more authority than women. Women gain respect and power as they age. Young wives begin gaining authority once they have children.

Traditionally, as can be seen on paintings and photos, some Romani men wear shoulder-length hair and a mustache, as well as an earring. Romani women generally have long hair, and Xoraxane Romani women often dye hair blonde with henna.

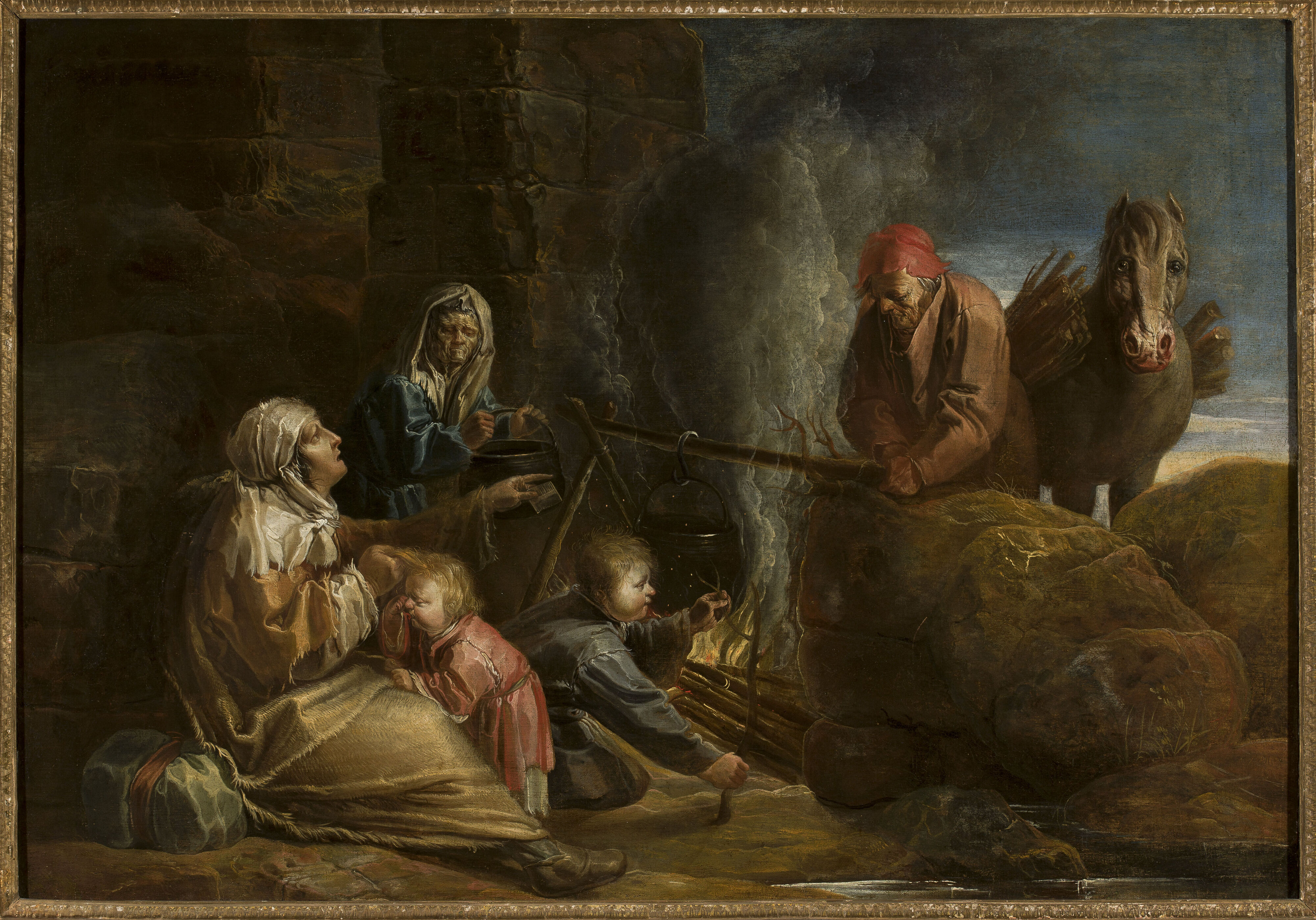
Roma cooking outside over an open fire in the Spanish Netherlands, in the early 17th century

Romani people traditionally displayed a desire to live in alignment with the natural world. Cooking was often done outdoors over open fires, using hunted/foraged ingredients. Many Romanis in England historically lived and traveled around the English countryside in vardos, while others settled in urban areas. Today, most are sedentary and live in houses. Romanis were often portrayed outdoors in rural settings in historical European art and literature.

Romani social behavior has traditionally been regulated by Indian social customs ("marime" or "marhime") which are respected by most Roma (and by most older generations of Sinti). This regulation affects many aspects of life and is applied to actions, people and things: parts of the human body are considered impure, the genital organs (because they produce emissions) and the rest of the lower body. Clothes for the lower body, as well as the clothes of menstruating women, are washed separately. Items used for eating are also washed in a different place. Childbirth is considered impure and must occur outside the dwelling. The mother is deemed impure for forty days after giving birth.

Death is considered impure, and affects the whole family, who remain impure for a period of time. Romani dead must be buried. Animals that are considered to have unclean habits are not eaten by the community.

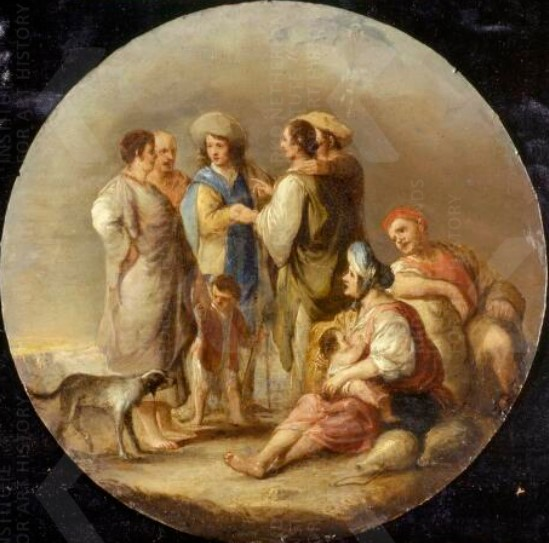
Gypsies reading the hand of a young traveler by Cornelis de Wael, c. 1607–1667

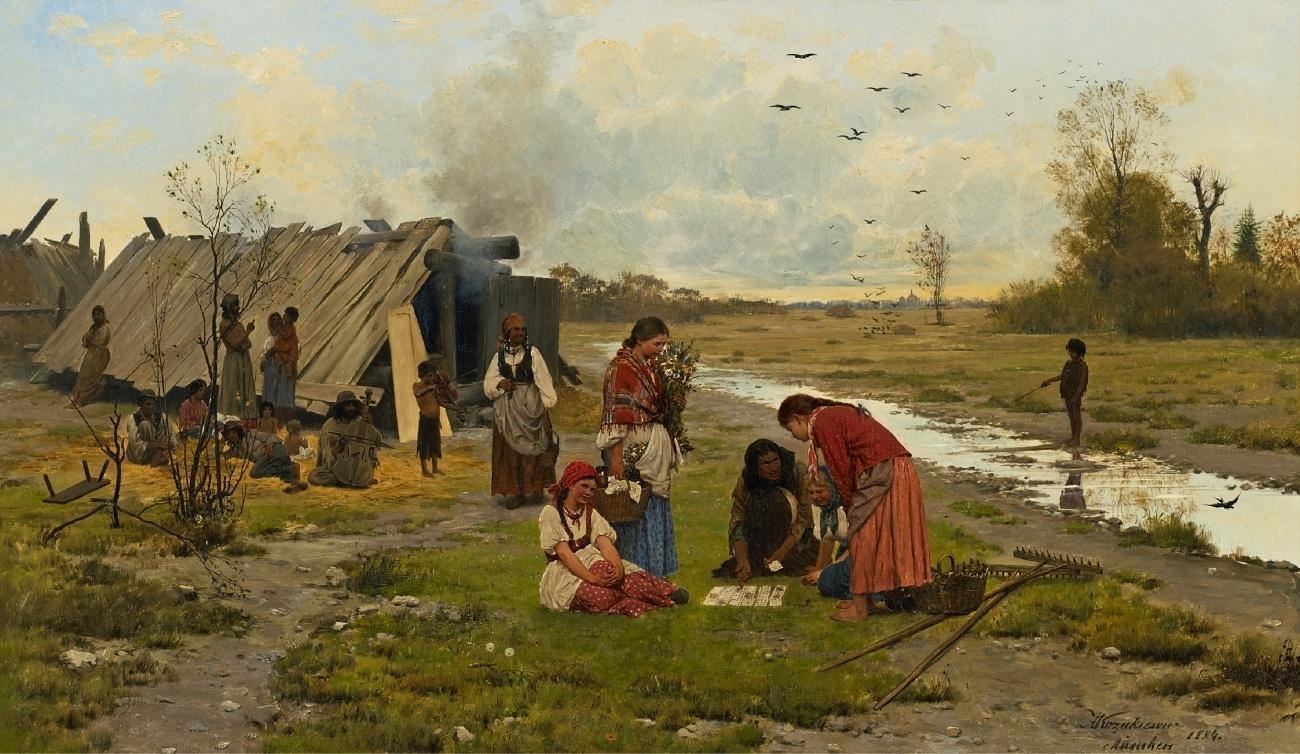
Gypsy fortuneteller in Poland, by Antoni Kozakiewicz, 1884

Romani women practiced fortune-telling for centuries, using techniques such as palm-reading. It provided income, and typically passed from mother to daughter. In 1747 and later again in 1824, palm-reading was made illegal in Britain, which drove it underground. Romani fortunetellers were traditionally known as drabardi. While it was practiced as a trade aimed at non-Romani, it was virtually never practiced amongst Romani. However, the notion that Romani people have psychic powers and that Romani women are fortunetellers also functions as a continuing negative stereotype.

Romani people historically practiced nomadic professions such as horse trading, metalworking, music, dancing, juggling, horse training, fortune-telling and animal training (such as bears). Romani people also earned money as tinkers or sieve-makers. Romani people turned to roofing and blacktopping when metalworking was superseded by factory technology.

=== Belonging and exclusion ===
In Romani philosophy, Romanipen (also romanypen, romanipe, romanype, romanimos, romaimos, romaniya) is the totality of the Romani spirit, Romani culture, Romani Law, and Romani identity.

An ethnic Rom is considered a gadjo in Romani society if they have no Romanipen. Sometimes a non-Rom may be considered a Rom if they do have Romanipen. Usually this is an adopted child. It has been hypothesized that this owes more to a framework of culture than adherence to traditional rules.

=== Religion ===
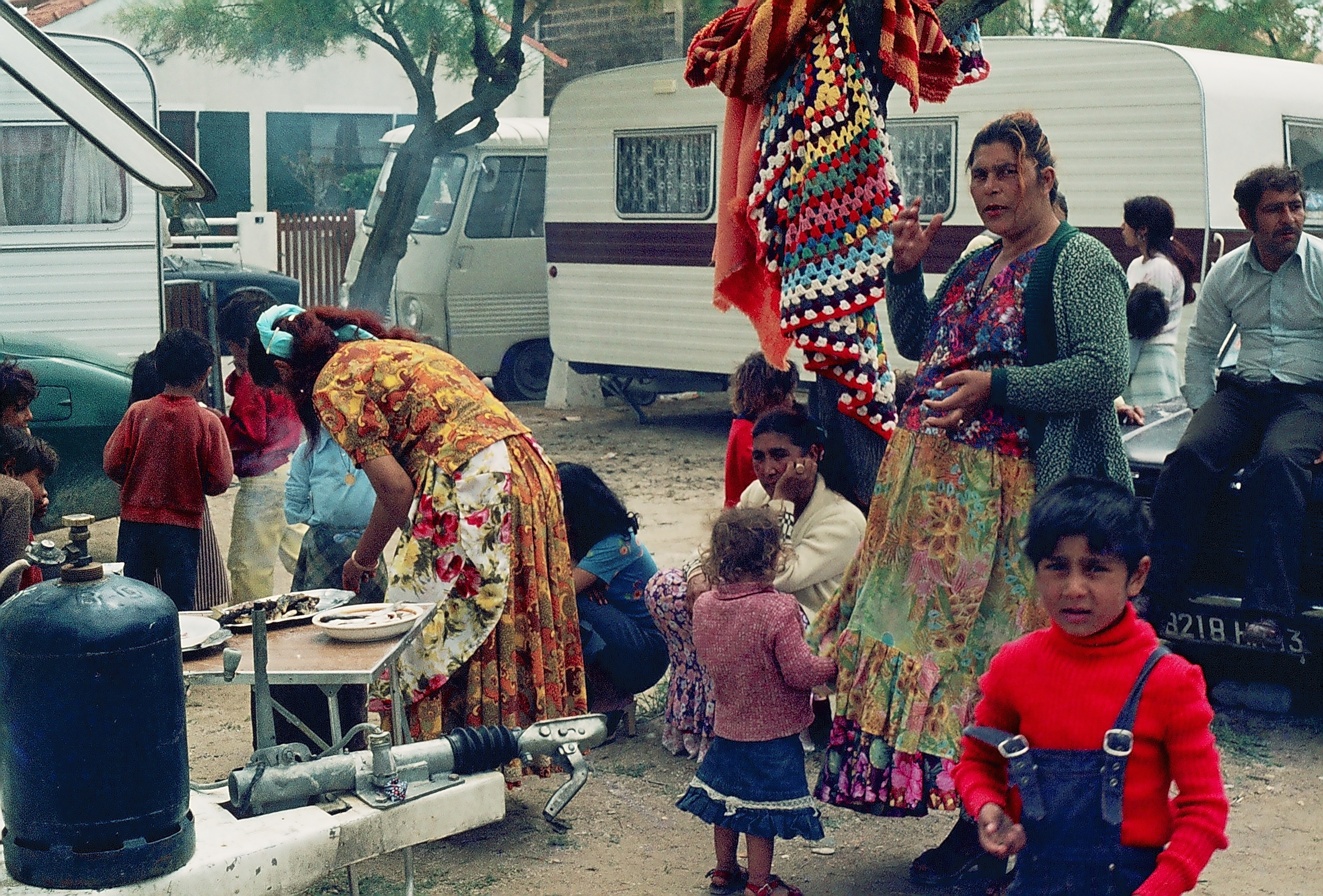
Christian Romanies during the pilgrimage to Saintes-Maries-de-la-Mer in France, 1980s

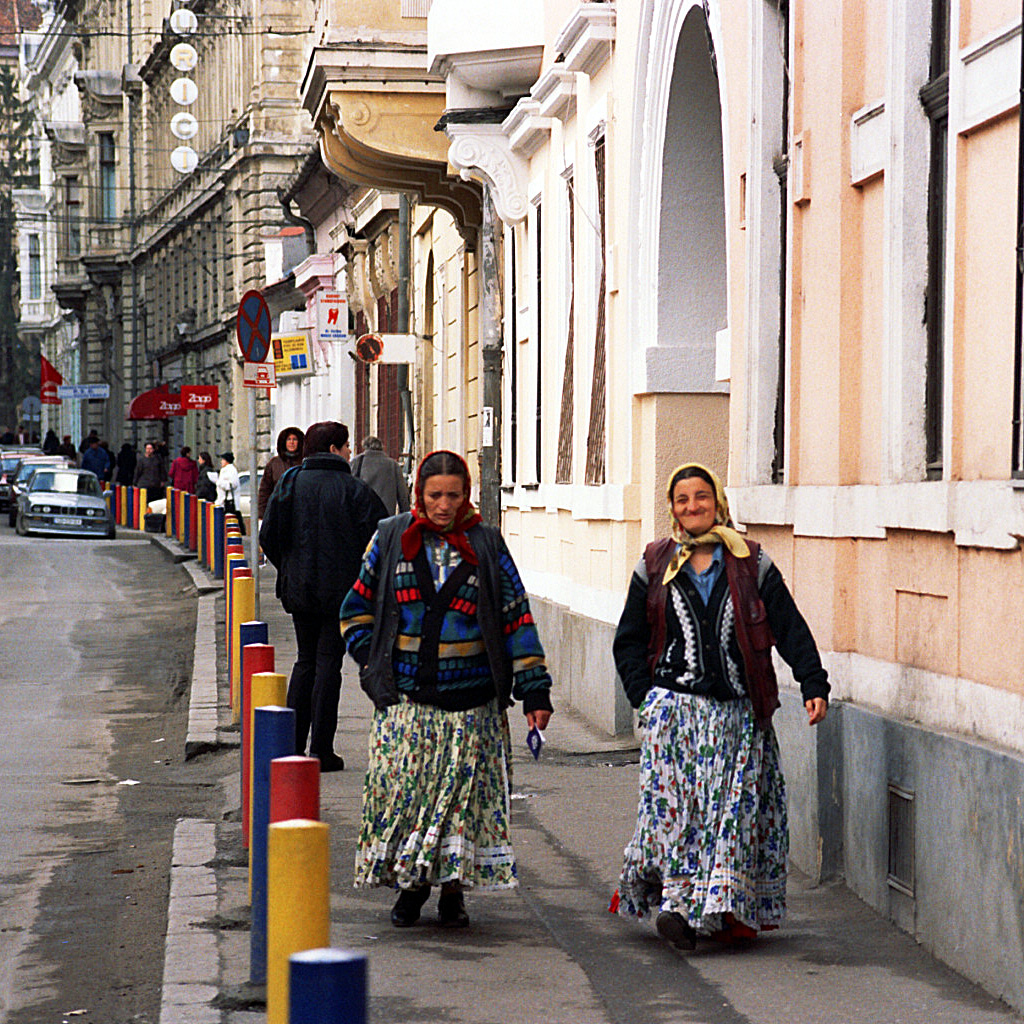
Two Orthodox Christian Romanies in Cluj-Napoca, Romania

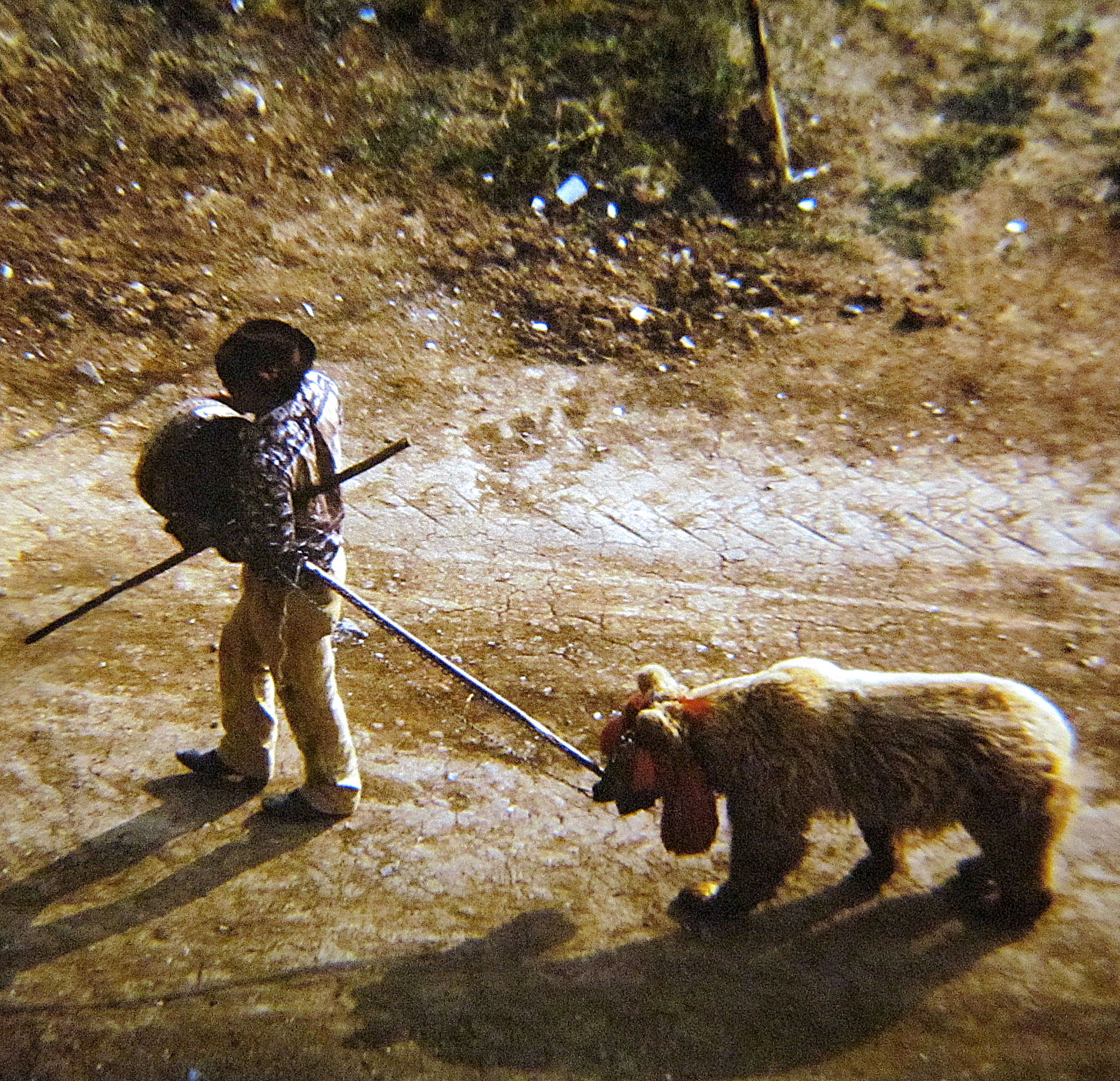
Rom and bear (Belgrade, Banovo Brdo, 1980s)

Religious Romani people are predominantly Christian or Muslim.

Muslim Romani people generally retain enduring influences of Ottoman culture, as shaped within Anatolia and former Ottoman territories. During periods of conflict, particularly the Ottoman wars in Europe, some Romani fled the Balkans, settling in northern and western Europe. Muslim Romani partaking in these migrations, or their descendants, eventually converted to Christianity.

==== Deities and saints ====
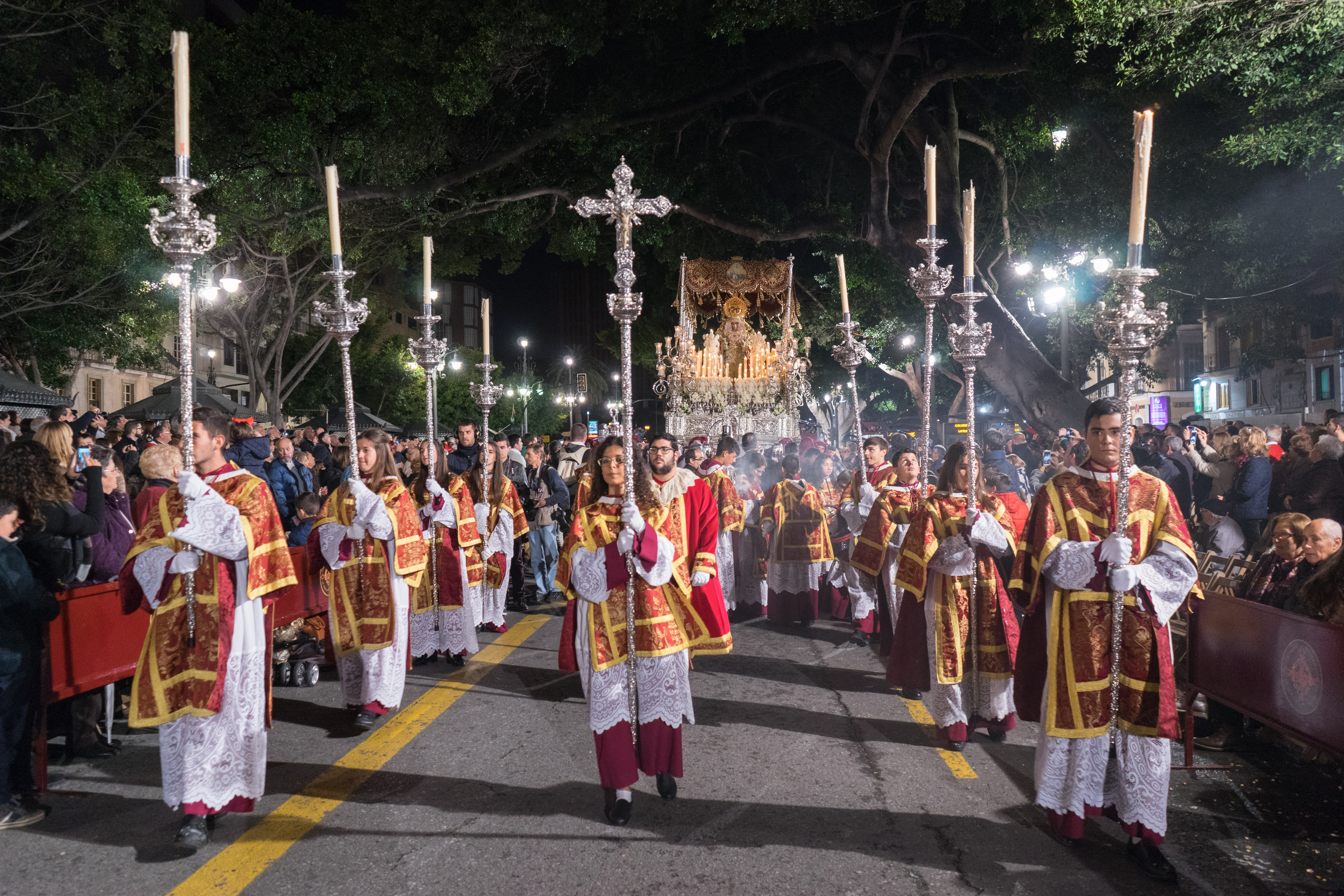
Members of the Cofradía de los Gitanos parading the "throne" of Mary of the O during the Holy Week in Malaga, Spain

Blessed Ceferino Giménez Malla is considered a patron saint of the Roma. Saint Sarah, or Sara e Kali, is venerated as a patron saint in her shrine at Saintes-Maries-de-la-Mer, France. Since the turn of the 21st century, Sara e Kali is understood to have been Kali, a Hindu deity brought from India by the Roma; as the Roma became Christianized, she was absorbed in a syncretic way and venerated.

Saint Sarah is now increasingly considered as "a Romani Goddess, the Protectress of the Roma" and an "indisputable link with Mother India".

===== Balkans/Southeastern Europe =====
For the Romani communities in Southeastern Europe, the following apply:

- Albania – The majority of the Romani population in Albania identify as Muslim.
- Bosnia and Herzegovina – The majority of the Romani population in Bosnia and Herzegovina identify as Muslim.
- Bulgaria – The majority of the Romani population in Bulgaria identify as Christian (mostly Orthodox). In northwestern Bulgaria, in addition to Sofia and Kyustendil, Christianity is the dominant religion among the Roma, and a major conversion to Eastern Orthodox Christianity among the Roma has occurred. In southeastern Bulgaria, Islam is the dominant religion among the Roma. Many of the Roma in Bulgaria declare themselves as "Turks"; a number of them converted to Christianity after the fall of communism in Bulgaria, and a number of them reconverted to Islam since.

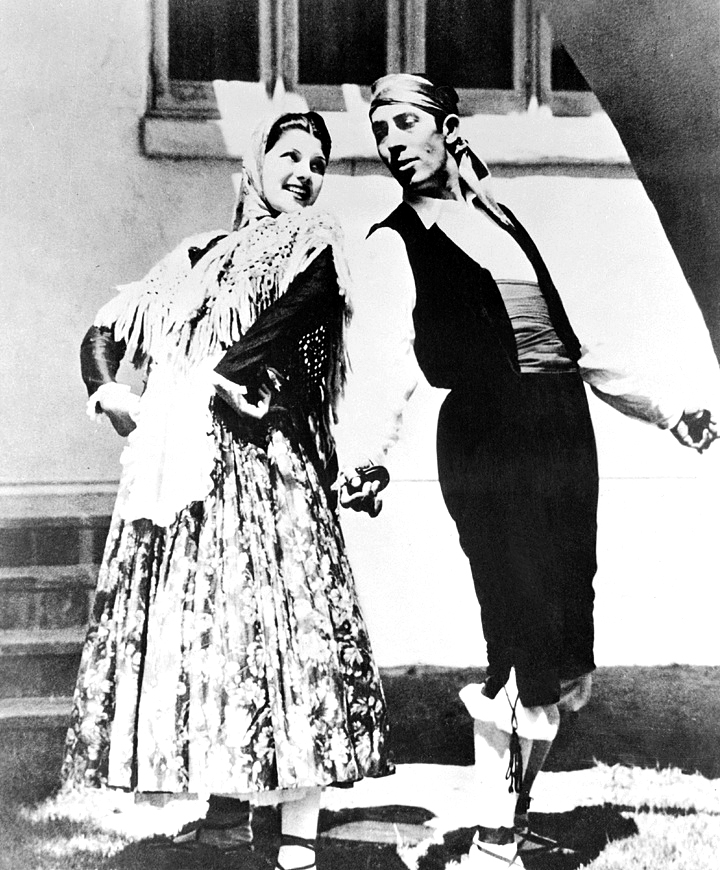
Margarita Cansino (later known as Rita Hayworth) with her father and dance partner Eduardo Cansino, 1933

- Croatia – The majority of the Romani population in Croatia identify as Christian (mostly Catholic). After World War II, a large number of Muslim Roma relocated to Croatia, the majority moving from Kosovo. Their language differs from those living in Međimurje and those who survived Romani Holocaust.
- Greece – The majority of the Romani population in Greece identify as Christian. (Note: Muslim Romas were excluded from the Deportation of Muslims from Greece's new conquered territory following the First Balkan War and presently form the majority of Greece's native Muslim population.) The descendants of groups, such as Sepečides or Sevljara, Kalpazaja, Filipidži and others, living in Athens, Thessaloniki, central Greece and Greek Macedonia are mostly Orthodox Christians, with Islamic beliefs held by a minority of the population. Following the Peace Treaty of Lausanne of 1923, many Muslim Roma moved to Turkey in the subsequent population exchange between Turkey and Greece.
- Hungary – The majority of the Romani population in Hungary identify as Christian. The country experienced an influx of Muslim Roma during the Ottoman period in Hungary, who later converted to Christianity. Theravada Buddhism influenced by the Dalit Buddhist movement has gained popularity in recent times among Romani in Hungary.

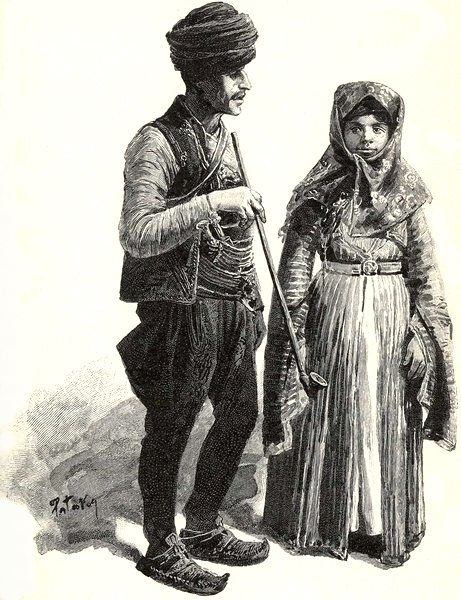
Muslim Romanies in Bosnia and Herzegovina (around 1900)

- Kosovo – The majority of the Romani population in Kosovo identify as Muslim and speak Albanian. Some Roma in Kosovo speak Serbian and identify as Orthodox Christians.
- Montenegro – The majority of the Romani population in Montenegro identify as Muslim.
- North Macedonia –The majority of the Romani population in North Macedonia identify as Muslim.
- Romania – The majority of the Romani population in Romania identify as Christian (mostly Orthodox). In Dobruja, there is a small community that are Muslim and also speak Turkish.
- Serbia – The majority of the Romani population in Serbia identify as Christian (mostly Orthodox). There are some Muslim Roma in southern Serbia, who are mainly refugees from Kosovo.
- Slovenia – The majority of the Romani population in Slovenia identify as Christian (mostly Catholic), although a sizeable proportion identify as Muslim.

==== Other regions ====
Modern-day Romani often adopted the dominant religion in the regions through which they had migrated. It is likely that the adherence to differing religions prevented families from intermarriage. In Eastern Europe, most Romani are Orthodox Christians, Muslims or Catholics. In Moldova, Romania, the majority of Romani inhabitants are Orthodox Christians. In Western Europe, the majority of Romani inhabitants are Catholic or Protestant. In Crimea and East Thrace, the majority of Romani inhabitants are Muslim. The majority of the diaspora in the United States practice Christianity.

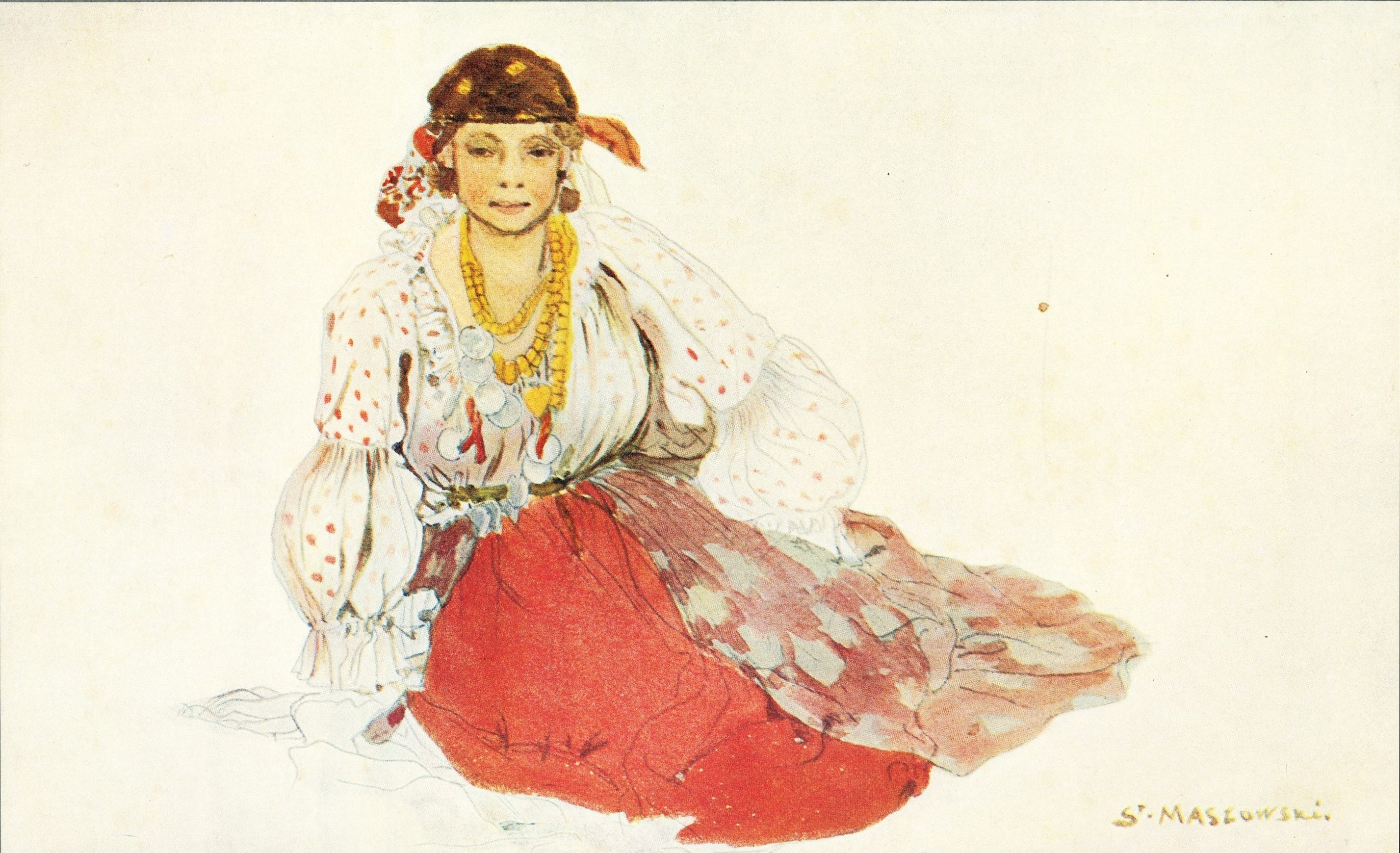
Gipsy Woman, Stanisław Masłowski, watercolour, 1877

In Ukraine and Russia, the Romani populations are Christian and Muslim. Their ancestors settled on the Crimean peninsula during the 17th and 18th centuries, but some migrated to Ukraine, southern Russia and the Povolzhie (along the Volga River). These communities are recognized for their staunch preservation of the Romani language and identity.

In Czechia, Poland, and Slovakia, Romani populations are Roman or Greek Catholic, many times adopting and following local, cultural Catholicism as a syncretic system of belief that incorporates distinct Roma beliefs and cultural aspects. For example, many Polish Roma delay their Church wedding due to the belief that sacramental marriage is accompanied by divine ratification, creating a virtually indissoluble union until the couple consummate, after which the sacramental marriage is dissoluble only by the death of a spouse. Therefore, for Polish Roma, once married, one cannot ever divorce. Another aspect of Polish Romas' Catholicism is a tradition of pilgrimage to the Jasna Góra Monastery.

In southern Spain, many Romanies are Pentecostal, but this is a small minority that has emerged in contemporary times. The majority of the Romani people in France are Catholic or Protestant (mostly Pentecostal).

=== Music ===
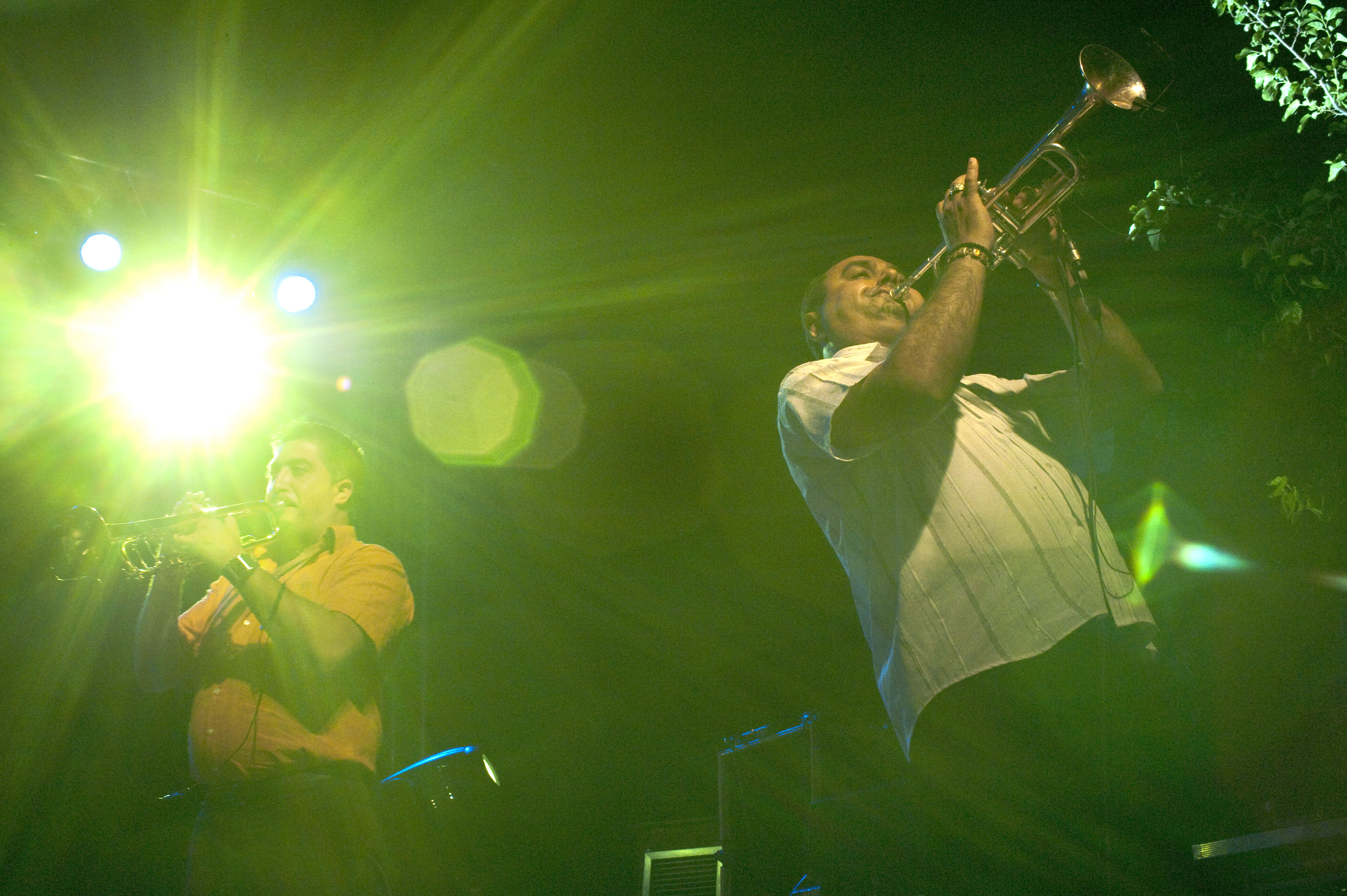
27 June 2009: Fanfare Ciocărlia live in Athens

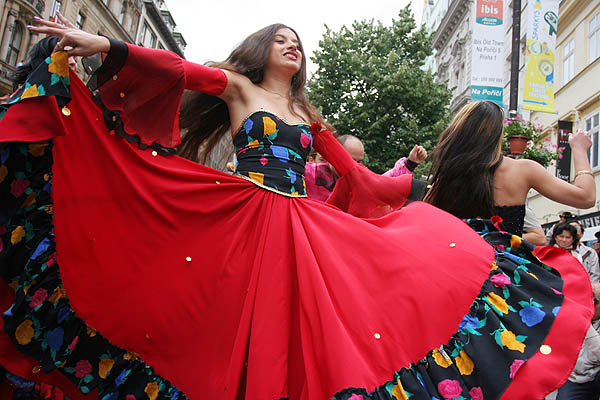
Street performance during the Khamoro World Roma Festival in Prague, 2007

Romani music plays an important role in Central and Eastern European countries. The style and performance practices of Romani musicians have influenced European classical composers such as Franz Liszt and Johannes Brahms. The lăutari who perform at traditional Romanian weddings are virtually all Romani.

Probably the most internationally prominent contemporary performers in the lăutari tradition are Taraful Haiducilor. Bulgaria's popular "wedding music", too, is almost exclusively performed by Romani musicians such as Ivo Papasov, a virtuoso clarinetist closely associated with this genre and Bulgarian pop-folk singer Azis.

Many famous classical musicians, such as the Hungarian pianist Georges Cziffra, are Romani, as are many prominent performers of manele. Zdob și Zdub, one of the Moldova's most prominent rock bands, although not Romanies themselves, draw heavily on Romani music, as do Spitalul de Urgență in Romania, Shantel in Germany, Goran Bregović in Serbia, Darko Rundek in Croatia, Beirut and Gogol Bordello in the United States.

Another tradition of Romani music is the Romani brass band, with practitioners such as Boban Marković, and the brass lăutari groups Fanfare Ciocărlia and Fanfare din Cozmesti.

The distinctive sound of Romani music influenced bolero, jazz, and flamenco (especially cante jondo) in Spain.

Dances such as Spain's flamenco and bolero were influenced by the Romani. Antonio Cansino blended Romani and Spanish flamenco and is credited with creating modern-day Spanish dance. The Dancing Cansinos popularized flamenco and bolero in the United States. Dancer and actress Rita Hayworth was Cansino's granddaughter.

European-style gypsy jazz ("jazz Manouche" or "Sinti jazz") is practiced among its creators (the Romanie People); one who acknowledged this artistic debt was guitarist Django Reinhardt. Contemporary artists in this tradition known internationally include Stochelo Rosenberg, Biréli Lagrène, Jimmy Rosenberg, Paulus Schäfer and Tchavolo Schmitt.

The Romani people in Turkey achieved musical acclaim. Local performers usually perform for holidays. Their music is typically performed on instruments such as the darbuka, gırnata and cümbüş.

Tallava is performed by the Romani community in Albania and Kosovo. Notable tallava musicians include Mandi Nishtulla, Marsel Selita, Bekim Dehari, and Muharrem Ahmeti.

=== Folklore ===
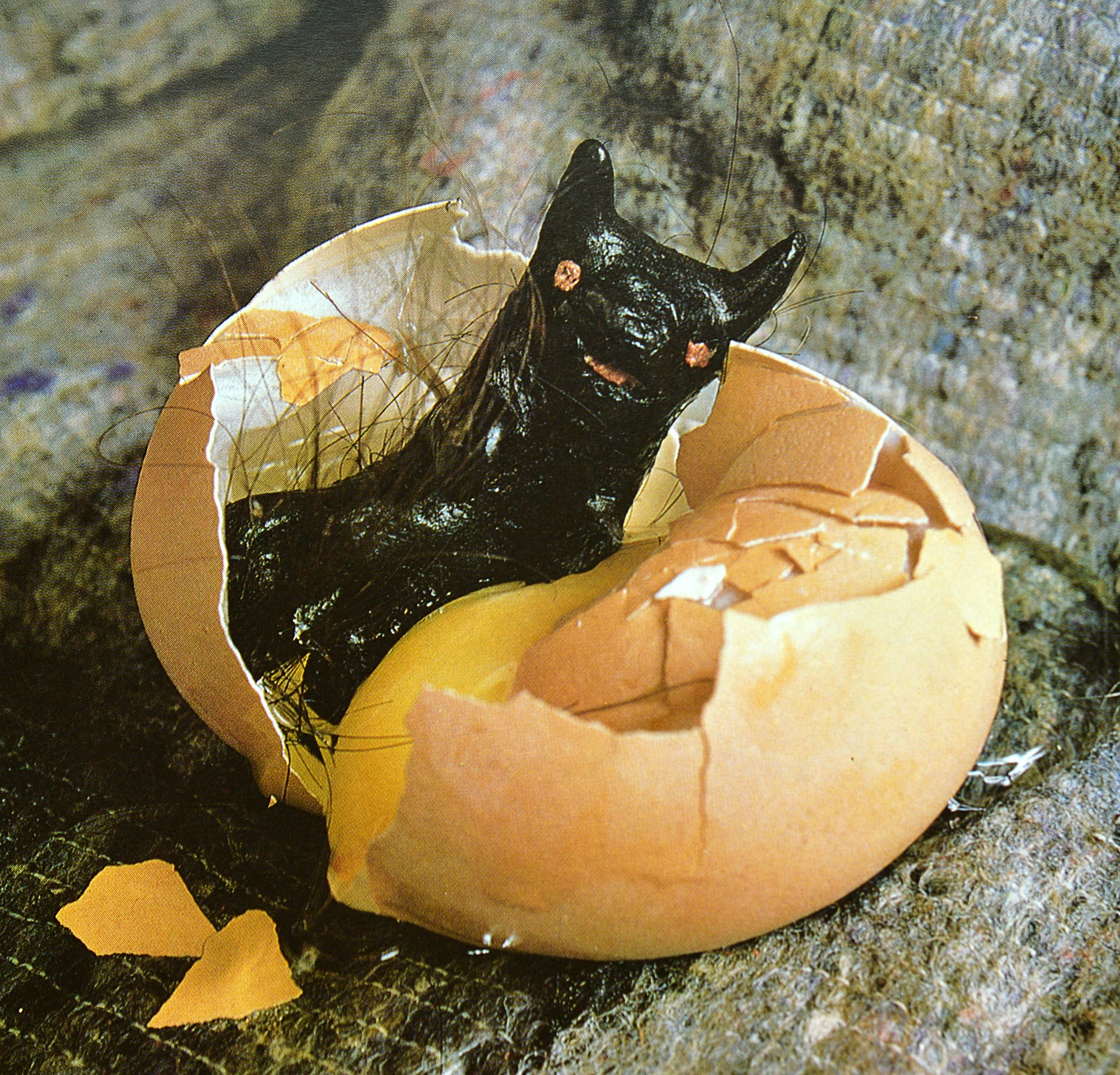

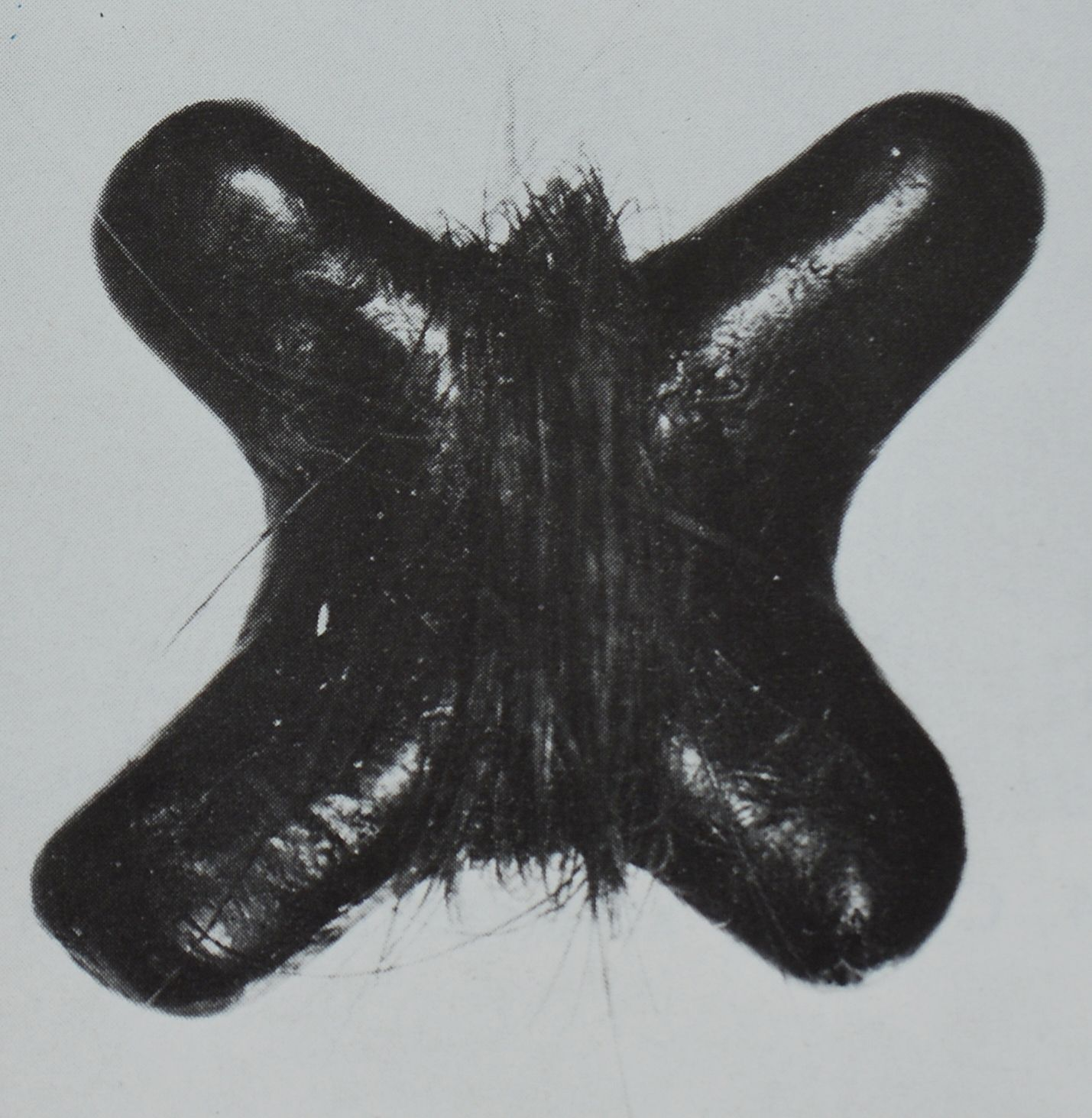

Romani folklore (paramichia) encompasses the folktales, myths, oral traditions, and legends. A popular legend among the Vlach Roma is of the hero Mundro Salamon, known by other Roma subgroups as Wise Solomon or O Godjiaver Yanko.

Some Roma believe in the mulo or mullo, meaning "one who is dead"; the Romani version of the vampire. The Roma from Slavic countries believe in werewolves. Roma figure prominently in the 1941 film The Wolf Man and the 2010 remake.

Other legends include the ability to levitate, travel through astral projection by way of meditation, invoke curses or blessings, conjure or channel spirits, and skill with illusion-casting. The Roma from Slavic countries believe in werewolves. Romani chovihanis often use a variety of herbs and amulets for protection. Garlic is a popular herb used by the Roma.

=== Cuisine ===
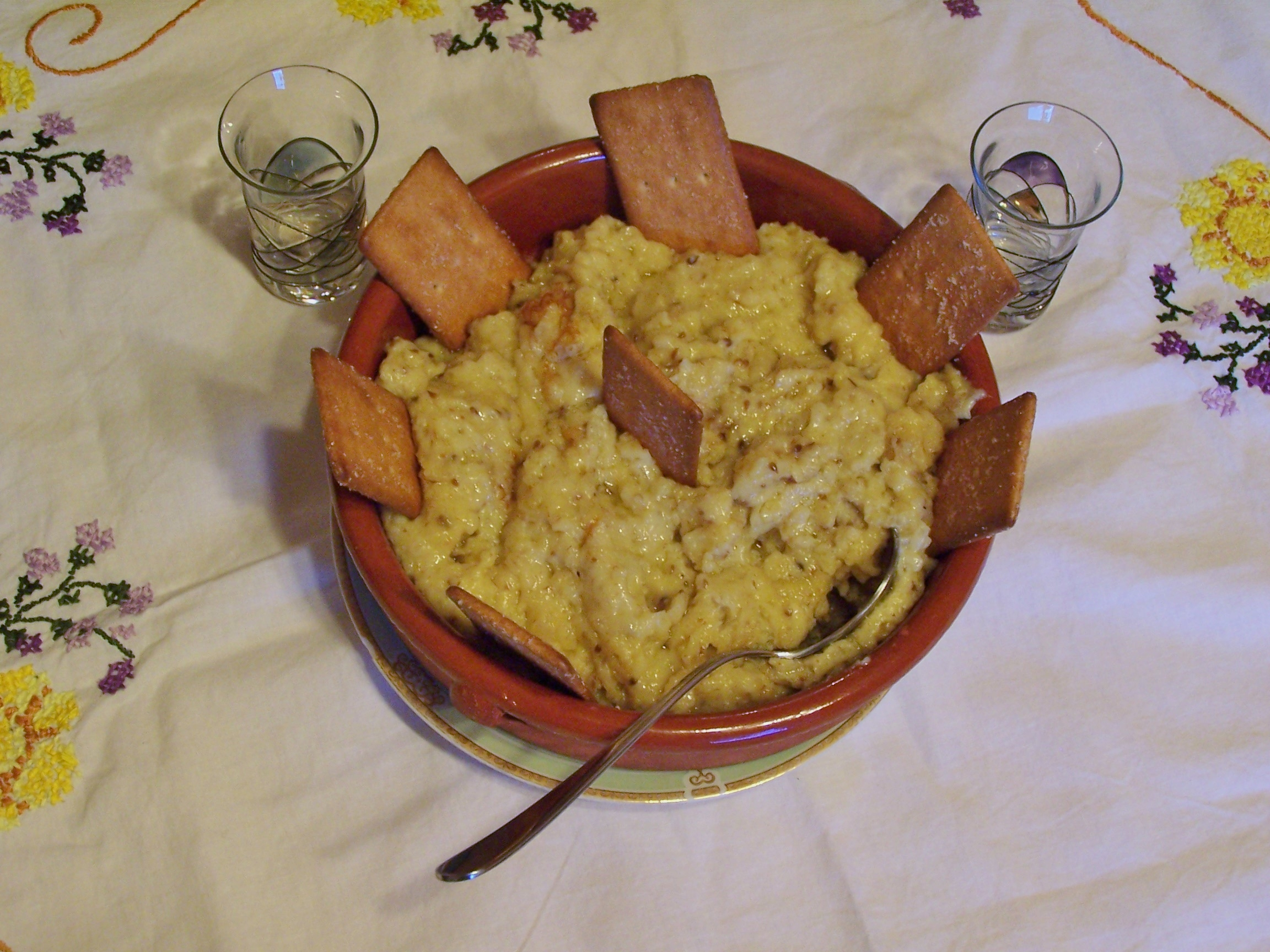
Gachas

Romani cuisine (Romani: Romano xabe) is diverse, reflecting the culinary traditions of the respective countries in which Romani people have lived for generations. However, distinctive recipes have emerged within Romani populations over time. In Southeastern Europe, Romani cuisine is part of the broader Balkan culinary tradition, with profound Ottoman Turkish influence. Stuffed cabbage and stuffed peppers are widely prepared. In Romania, cornmeal is a frequent dish. Ian Hancock dubbed Romani cuisine the “soul food of Europe”.

Some Roma hold that certain foods are auspicious, or lucky (baxtalo), especially foods with pungent tastes such as garlic, lemon, tomato, and peppers, and fermented foods such as sauerkraut, pickles and sour cream. Hedgehogs were historically a delicacy among some Romanis. Traditionally, many Romani would avoid eating food prepared by non-Romani. Tea is widely enjoyed, prepared with peaches and strawberries. Frybread is another favored dish. Romani dishes may retain influences from their historically nomadic lifestyle.

== Language ==

Romani (/ˈrɒməni, ˈroʊ-/ ROM-ə-nee, ROH-; Romanes /ˈrɒmənɪs/ ROM-ən-iss; or Romany; Romani: rromani ćhib) is an Indo-Aryan macrolanguage of the Romani people. Most Roma speak one of its dialects. Its largest dialects are Balkan Romani (about 600,000 speakers), Vlax Romani (500,000), and Sinte Romani (300,000). Some Romani communities speak mixed languages based on the surrounding language with some Romani-derived vocabulary; these are known as Para-Romani varieties rather than Romani dialects.

These dialects typically incorporate loanwords and calques from national languages, especially for terms that Romani lacks. Most of the Ciganos of Portugal, the Gitanos of Spain, the Romanichal of Great Britain, and the Romanisael of Sweden and Norway speak the mixed languages Caló, Angloromani and Scandoromani, respectively. Most Romani language-speaking communities there consist of later immigrants.

Assuming 3.5 million speakers in Europe, makes Romani the second-largest minority language in Europe, behind Catalan.

Romani speakers are bilingual, accustomed to borrowing words or phrases from a second language; this makes it difficult for Roma to communicate across national borders. No tradition or standard guides Romani language use.

== Persecutions ==
The Romani population has historically been subjected to persecution, largely stemming from pervasive stereotypes that characterize them as criminals, scammers, fraudsters, con artists and thieves.

Denial is common about the continuing persecution faced by the Roma.

=== Roma enslavement ===
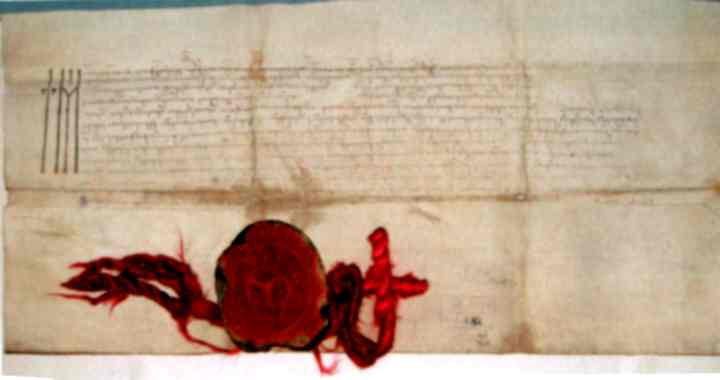
A deed of donation through which Stephen III of Moldavia donates a number of sălașe of Romani slaves to the Rădăuţi bishopric

Slavery was widely practiced in medieval Europe, including the territory of present-day Romania (then Wallachia and Moldavia), from the 13th–14th centuries. Legislation decreed that Roma there, as well as any others who immigrated there, were classified as slaves. Slavery was gradually abolished during the 1840s and 1850s.

The origins of slavery in the Danubian Principalities are not known. Whether the Roma came to Wallachia and Moldavia as free people or as slaves is unresolved. Possibly, the Romanians took the Roma from the Mongols and left them as slaves. Alternatively captured Roma may have become enslaved during battles with the Tatars.

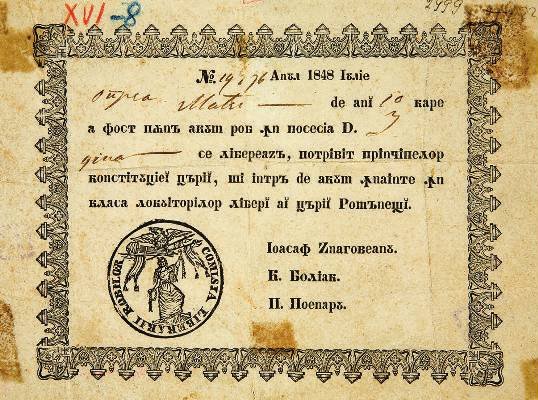
Slave liberation certificate issued during the Wallachian Revolution of 1848

Some Roma may have been slaves of the Mongols or the Tatars, or served as auxiliaries in the Mongol or Tatar armies. However, most of them migrated across the Danube at the end of the 14th century, after the founding of Wallachia. The institution of slavery was already established in Moldavia and possibly in both principalities. After the Roma arrived, slavery became widespread. The Tatar slaves, smaller in numbers, were eventually merged into the Romani population.

=== Persecution ===
Some Roma refugees arrived in western Europe in the 15th century, fleeing the Ottoman conquest of the Balkans. They were often suspected of linkage with the Ottoman invasion because their physical appearance was seen as exotic. (The Imperial Diet at Landau and Freiburg in 1496–1498 declared that the Roma were spies for the Ottomans). In western Europe, this led to persecution, often violent, including attempts at ethnic cleansing, persisting into the 20th century. In times of social tension, the Romani were scapegoated; even accused of bringing plague.

On 30 July 1749, Spain conducted The Great Roundup of Gitanos. The Crown ordered a nationwide raid that split families because all able-bodied men were interned in labor camps. The measure was eventually reversed and the Roma were freed as protests erupted in various communities. Sedentary Roma were esteemed and protected in rural Spain.

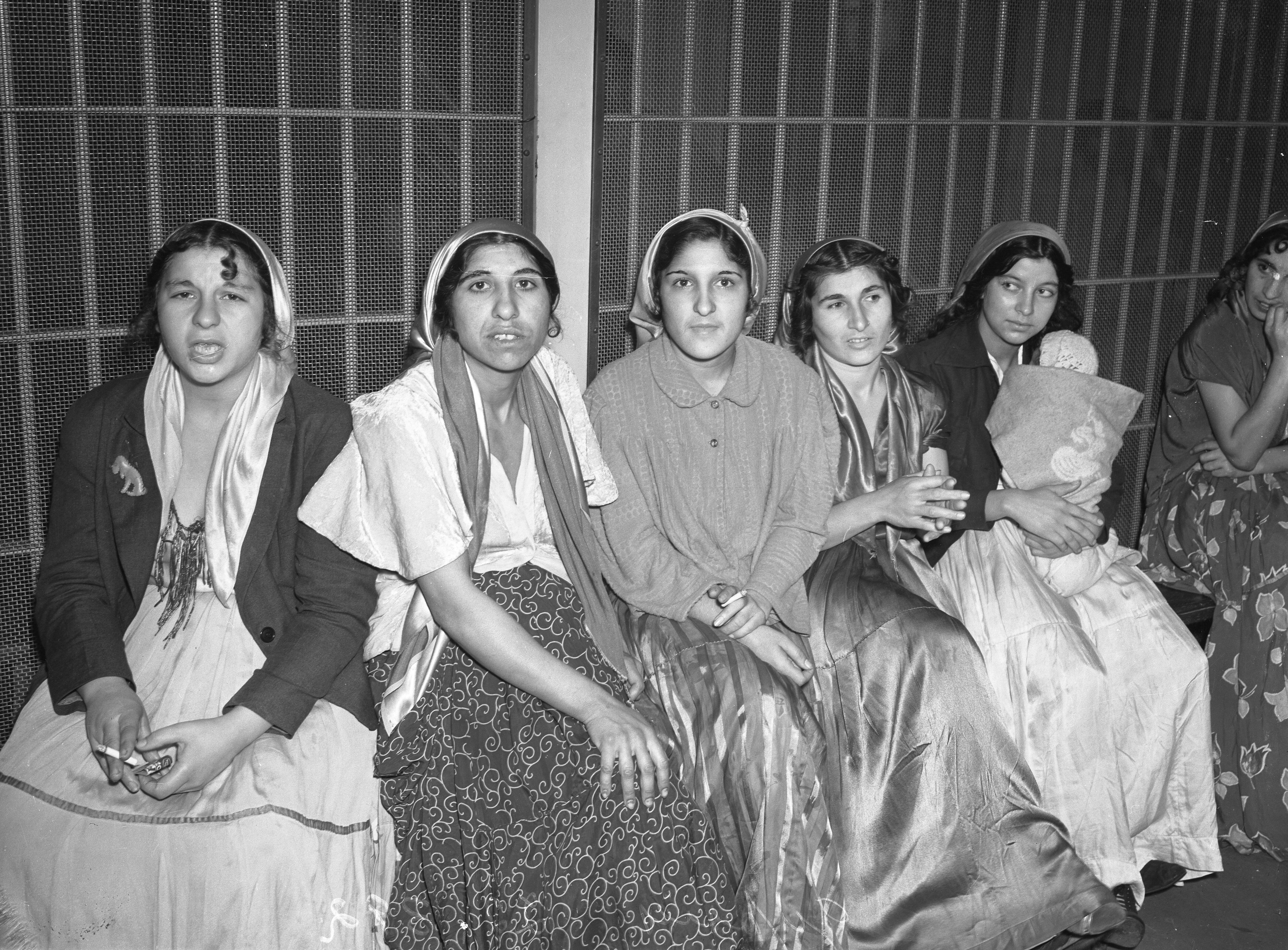
Romani women in Lincoln Heights Jail, Los Angeles, California, 1940

Later in the 19th century, Romani immigration was forbidden in some areas outside Europe, mostly in the Anglosphere. In 1880, Argentina prohibited immigration by Roma, as did the United States in 1885.

=== Forced assimilation ===
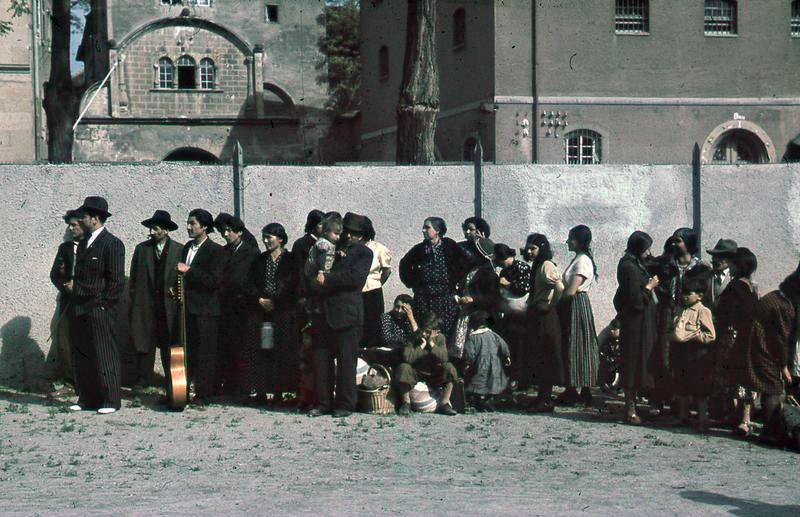
Deportation of Roma from Asperg, Germany, 1940 (photograph by the Rassenhygienische Forschungsstelle)

Under Maria Theresa (1740–1780), the Habsburg monarchy issued decrees that attempted to get the Roma to permanently settle, removed their rights to horse and wagon ownership (1754) to reduce their mobility, renamed them "New Citizens", and obliged Romani boys to enter military service like any other citizen if they had no trade (1761, and Revision 1770), required them to register with the local authorities (1767); and prohibited marriages between Romanis (1773) to force them to assimilate. Her successor, Josef II, prohibited traditional Romani clothing and the Romani language, on penalty of flogging. Schools were obliged to register and integrate Romani children; the first modern policy of assimilation.

In Spain, attempts to assimilate the Gitanos were under way as early as 1619. The Gitanos were forcibly settled, the Romani language was prohibited, Gitano men and women were sent to separate workhouses, and their children were sent to orphanages. King Charles III took a more progressive approach, giving them the same rights as Spanish citizens and ending their official (race-based) denigration. While he prohibited their nomadic lifestyle, their Calo language, Romani clothing, their trade in horses and other itinerant trades; he also forbade discrimination against them, and forbade the guilds from barring them. The disparaging word gitano was forbidden. It was replaced with "New Castilian", a designation also applied to former Jews and Muslims.

Most historians believe that Charles III's pragmática failed for three main reasons, reasons that ultimately derived from its implementation outside major cities and in marginal areas: the difficulty the Gitano community faced in changing its nomadic lifestyle; the community's marginal lifestyle, and the difficulties of applying the pragmática to education and work. One author ascribes its failure to the wider population's overall rejection of the Gitanos.

Forced assimilation was implemented in other countries: in Norway a law permitted the state to remove children from their parents and place them in state institutions passed in 1896. Some 1,500 Romani children were taken from their parents in the 20th century.

=== Porajmos (Romani Holocaust) ===
Persecution of the Roma reached a peak during the Romani Holocaust in World War II. The Nazis perpetrated genocide against them. In 1935, Roma living in Germany were stripped of citizenship by the Nuremberg laws and subjected to violence and imprisonment in concentration camps. The policy was extended to areas under German occupation, and was implemented by other Axis countries, most notably, the Independent State of Croatia, Romania, and Hungary. The extermination camps began massacring Roma in 1942.

In the absence of accurate pre-war census figures, the number of Romani victims in the Romani Holocaust cannot be assessed. Estimates range from 90,000-4,000,000, with most falling between 200,000 and 500,000. Lower estimates do not include Roma who were killed in other Axis countries.

== Contemporary issues ==
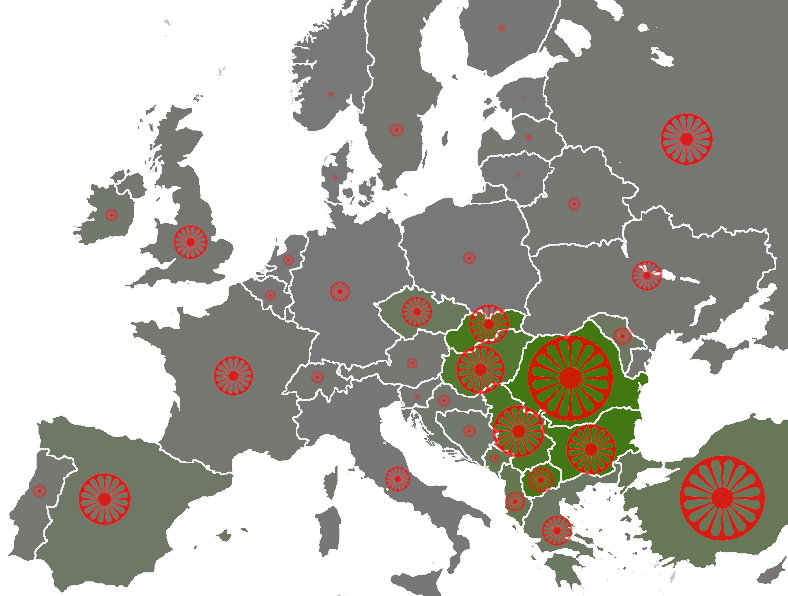
Distribution of the Roma in Europe (2007 Council of Europe "average estimates", totalling 9.8 million)

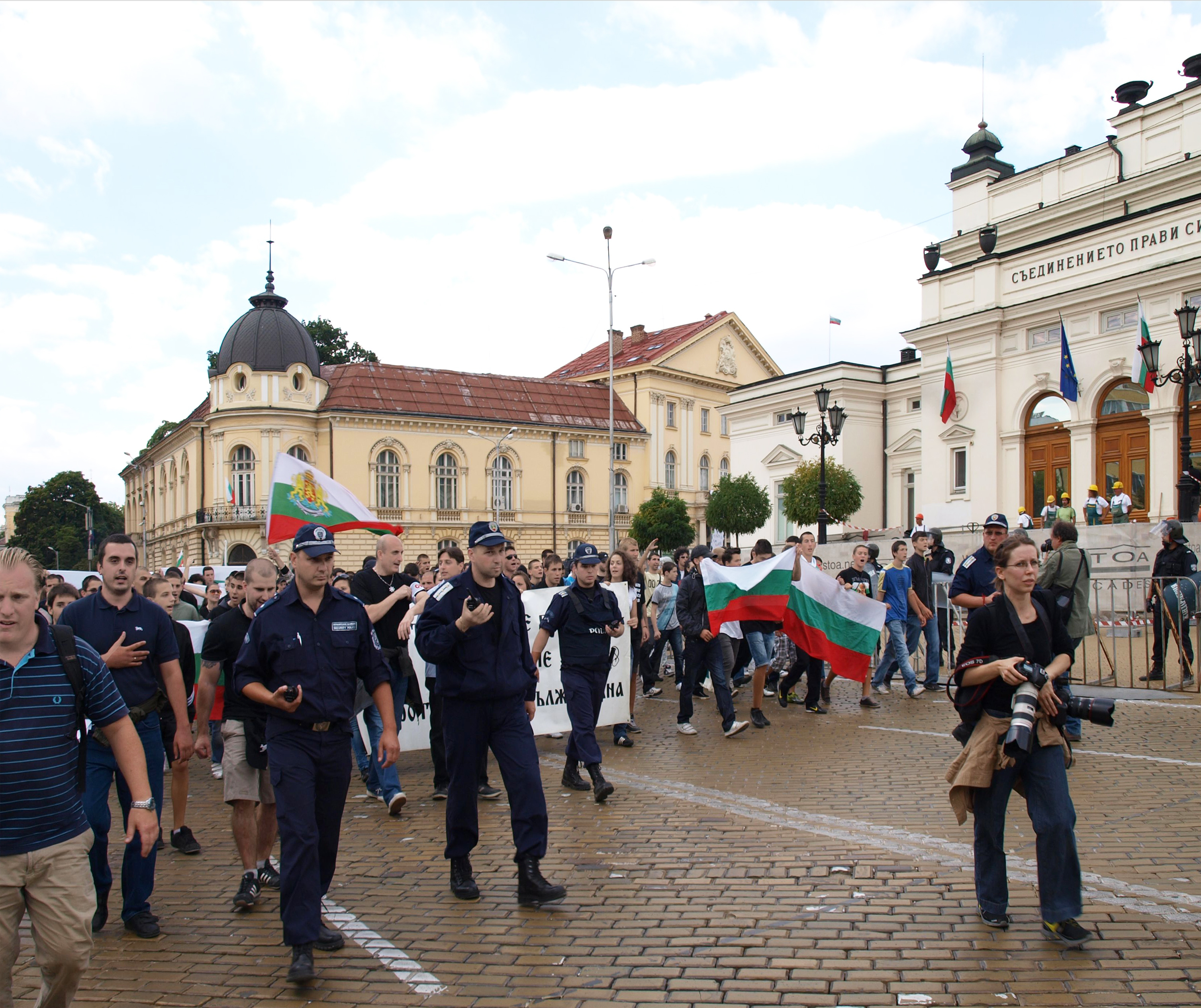
Anti-Romani protests in Sofia, Bulgaria, 2011

In Europe, the Romani population are associated statistically and culturally with high poverty, high crime rates, and behavior that is considered antisocial or inappropriate by their neighbors. Anti-Roma discrimination continues, despite efforts to address such bigotry.

Amnesty International reported continued anti-Romani discrimination during the late 20th century, particularly in Romania, Serbia, Slovakia, Hungary, Slovenia, and Kosovo. The European Union issued the national Roma integration strategy to encourage member states to work towards greater Romani inclusion and uphold the rights of the Roma in the European Union.

*projections for Serbia also include up to 97.000 Roma IDPs in Serbia

Roma percentage of population in European countries based on higher estimates
Country	Percent
Bulgaria	10.33%
North Macedonia	9.59%
Slovakia	9.17%
Hungary	9%
Romania	8.23%
Turkey	5.97%
Spain	3.21%
Albania	3.18%
Montenegro	2.95%
Greece	2.47%
Serbia	1.98%
Czech Republic	1.96%
Kosovo	1.47%

Romani children face significant disadvantages in education, including lower rates of school enrollment and higher dropout rates. Romani children are disproportionately placed in special education schools and often segregated from other children. Educational disparities are compounded by higher rates of poverty, housing insecurity, discrimination, and limited access to early childhood education.

The Roma of Kosovo continued to be persecuted by ethnic Albanians after the Kosovo War, and much of the Romani community was expelled.

Czechoslovakia carried out a policy of sterilization of Romani women, starting in 1973. The dissidents of the Charter 77 denounced it in 1977–78 as a genocide, but the practice continued through the Velvet Revolution of 1989. A 2005 report identified dozens of cases of coercive sterilization between 1979 and 2001, and called for criminal investigations and possible prosecution against several health care workers and administrators.

In 2008, following the rape and subsequent murder of an Italian woman in Rome at the hands of a Romani man, the Italian government declared that Italy's Romani population represented a national security risk and declared that would address the emergenza nomadi (nomad emergency). Italian government officials accused the Romanies of responsibility for rising urban crime rates.

The 2008 deaths of Cristina and Violetta Djeordsevic, two Romani children who drowned while beach-goers ignored them, brought international attention to the relationship between ethnic Italians and Roma. Reviewing the situation in 2012, one Belgian magazine observed:

On International Roma Day, which falls on 8 April, the significant proportion of Europe's 12 million Roma who live in deplorable conditions will not have much to celebrate. And poverty is not the only worry for the community. Ethnic tensions are on the rise. In 2008, Roma camps came under attack in Italy, intimidation by racist parliamentarians is the norm in Hungary. Speaking in 1993, Václav Havel prophetically remarked that "the treatment of the Roma is a litmus test for democracy": and democracy has been found wanting. The consequences of the transition to capitalism have been disastrous for the Roma. Under communism they had jobs, free housing and schooling. Now many are unemployed, many are losing their homes and racism is increasingly rewarded with impunity.

A 2016 Pew Research poll found that Italians held strong anti-Roma views; 82% of Italians expressed negative opinions about Roma. In Greece 67%, in Hungary 64%, in France 61%, in Spain 49%, in Poland 47%, in the UK 45%, in Sweden 42%, in Germany 40%, and in the Netherlands 37% had an unfavourable view of Roma. A 2019 Pew Research poll found that 83% of Italians, 76% of Slovaks, 72% of Greeks, 68% of Bulgarians, 66% of Czechs, 61% of Lithuanians, 61% of Hungarians, 54% of Ukrainians, 52% of Russians, 51% of Poles, 44% of French, 40% of Spaniards, and 37% of Germans held unfavorable views of Roma. A 2020 IRES survey revealed that 72% of Romanians held a negative opinion about them.

As of 2019, reports of anti-Roma attacks were increasing across Europe. Discrimination against Roma remains widespread in Kosovo, Romania, Slovakia, Bulgaria, and Czechia, against which the European Court of Human Rights ruled in Romani advocates' favor over discriminatory and segregationist education and housing practices. In 2018 Romani communities across Ukraine were the target of violent attacks.

Ukraini Romani refugees fleeing the 2022 Russian invasion faced discrimination in Europe, including in Poland, Czechia, and Moldova.

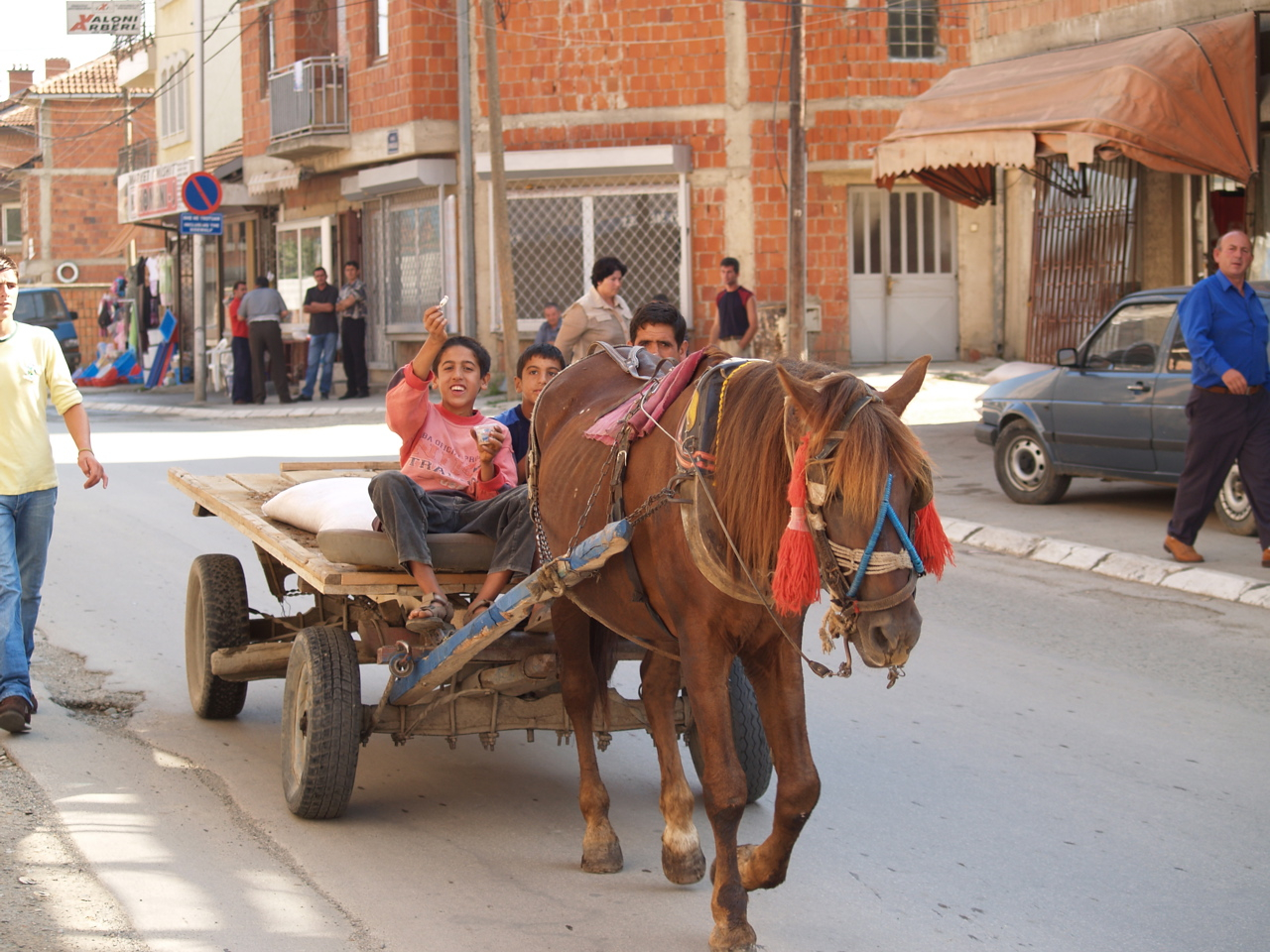
Roma people in Gjakova, Kosovo in 2005

Concerning employment, a 2019 report by the FRA revealed that, across surveyed European states, on average only 34% of Romani men and 16% of Romani women were in paid work.

Romani children are overrepresented as victims of human trafficking and sexual exploitation.

Many EU Roma have no health insurance and around 57% have no job or paid employment. A third of households lack tap water, a toilet and a shower.

Roma and Sinti communities face markedly higher levels of anxiety, sleep issues, depression, and psychological distress, stemming from discrimination, marginalization, poverty, and trauma.

The European Union Agency for Fundamental Rights reported in 2021 that 25% of Roma surveyed in ten European countries had experienced discrimination within the prior year in healthcare, housing, education, or employment. Of these, only 5% reported the incidents, a decrease from 16% in 2016. 80% of Roma across ten European countries were at risk of poverty, which has remained unchanged since 2016. Despite slight improvements in housing conditions (the share living in poor housing decreased from 61% to 52%), material deprivation and overcrowding remain widespread. Discrimination remains a significant barrier to equal access to education, contributing to segregation and education deficiencies. The FRA Roma Survey 2021 highlighted health disparities; Roma men live, on average, nine years less, and Roma women eleven years less than their neighbors.

=== Forced repatriation ===
In the summer of 2010, French authorities demolished at least 51 Roma camps and began to repatriate them. This reflected tensions between the French state and Romani communities, heightened after a traveller drove through a French police checkpoint, hit an officer, attempted to hit two more officers, and was killed by police. In retaliation a group of Roma, armed with hatchets and iron bars, attacked the Saint-Aignan police station, toppled traffic lights and road signs and burned three cars. The French government was accused of perpetrating these actions. EU Justice Commissioner Viviane Reding stated that the European Commission should take legal action against France. A leaked file dated 5 August, sent from the Interior Ministry to regional police chiefs, included the instruction: "Three hundred camps or illegal settlements must be cleared within three months, Roma camps are a priority."

=== Voluntarily assimilated groups ===
Some Romani groups have been absorbed by other ethnic groups. Assimilated Romani people often keep their identity a secret from outsiders, obscuring the extent to which Romani people voluntarily assimilate.

The most notable case of large-scale Romani assimilation is the Romani Crimean Tatars. Independent waves of Romani people completely or nearly-completely assimilated into the Crimean Tatar people. Romani Crimean Tatars are the fourth largest subgroup of the Crimean Tatar nation.

For centuries, the Crimean Roma worked as artisans, musicians, entertainers, and in blue-collar professions such as porters and blacksmiths. Almost all Romani Crimean Tatars living in Crimea are legally Gadjo because they are recorded as ethnic Crimean Tatars on their passports and censuses and consider their Crimean Tatar identity to be primary. Mixed marriages between Romani Crimean Tatars and other Crimean Tatars without Romani backgrounds are accepted by Crimean Roma. Many prominent Crimean Tatar celebrities are of Romani descent, such as Enver Sherfedinov and Sabriye Erecepova. Historian Olga Kucherenko postulates that while Crimean Tatars were in exile, additional Romani people of non-Crimean origin were similarly absorbed.

In Basque Country, the Erromintxela people are assimilated descendants of a 15th-century wave of Kalderash Roma, who entered Basque Country via France. Both ethnically, linguistically, and culturally, they are distinct from Caló-speaking Roma in Spain and the Cascarot Roma of Northern Basque Country. Over time the Erromintxela replaced many Romani customs with Gadjo Basque customs. Their Erromintxela language is a mixture of Basque and Romani, but it is dying becasue so few speakers are left.

In the United States, an estimated one million Americans are of Romani descent, although most obscure their background and keep a low profile. Most Americans have little awareness of Romani people, who face less discrimination there than in Europe. Prominent Americans of Romani descent include Charlie Chaplin and President Bill Clinton.

=== Segregation and water injustice ===
Roma communities across Europe face significant barriers in accessing adequate water, sanitation, and hygiene services. A 2018 report by the European Roma Rights Centre (ERRC) exemplifies, claiming that the systematic exclusion of Roma from decision-making processes results in the denial of the human right "to safe and clean drinking water and sanitation" as defined by the UN General Assembly in 2010. These cases of systemic discrimination, environmental racism, and the failure of authorities to provide sanitation services reflect patterns identified in research and in legal proceedings. Litigation in Bulgaria, Slovakia, Romania, Hungary, North Macedonia, Bosnia and Herzegovina, Serbia, and Kosovo exposed the problem's systemic nature.

=== Special education ===
A Roma Special School is a school for Roma children. They are often associated with schools for disabled children, and are generally considered to put Roma students at a disadvantage by delivering lower-quality education than traditional schools. Special Schools are sometimes preferred by Roma parents because children are better-protected from discrimination.

== Organizations and projects ==
- World Romani Congress
- European Roma Rights Centre
- Gypsy Lore Society
- International Romani Union
- Decade of Roma Inclusion, multinational project
- International Romani Day (8 April)
- Contact Point for Roma and Sinti Issues
- National Advisory Board on Romani Affairs (Finland)

== Artistic depictions ==
Many depictions of Roma in literature and art present romanticized narratives of the mystical powers of fortune telling or as people who have an irascible or passionate temper paired with a love of freedom and a habit of criminality. The Roma were a popular subject in Venetian painting from the time of Giorgione at the start of the 16th century. The inclusion of such a figure adds an exotic oriental flavor to scenes. A Venetian Renaissance painting by Paris Bordone (c. 1530, Strasbourg) of the Holy Family in Egypt makes Elizabeth a Romani fortune-teller; the scene is otherwise located in a European landscape. The Romani community served as an inspiration and is represented in Bram Stoker's Dracula.

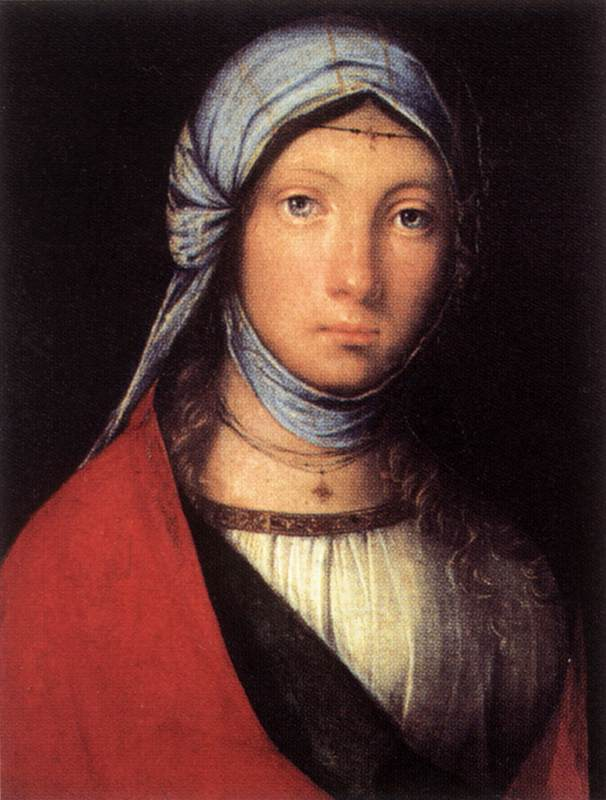
Boccaccio Boccaccino: Gypsy Girl (c.1504–1505)

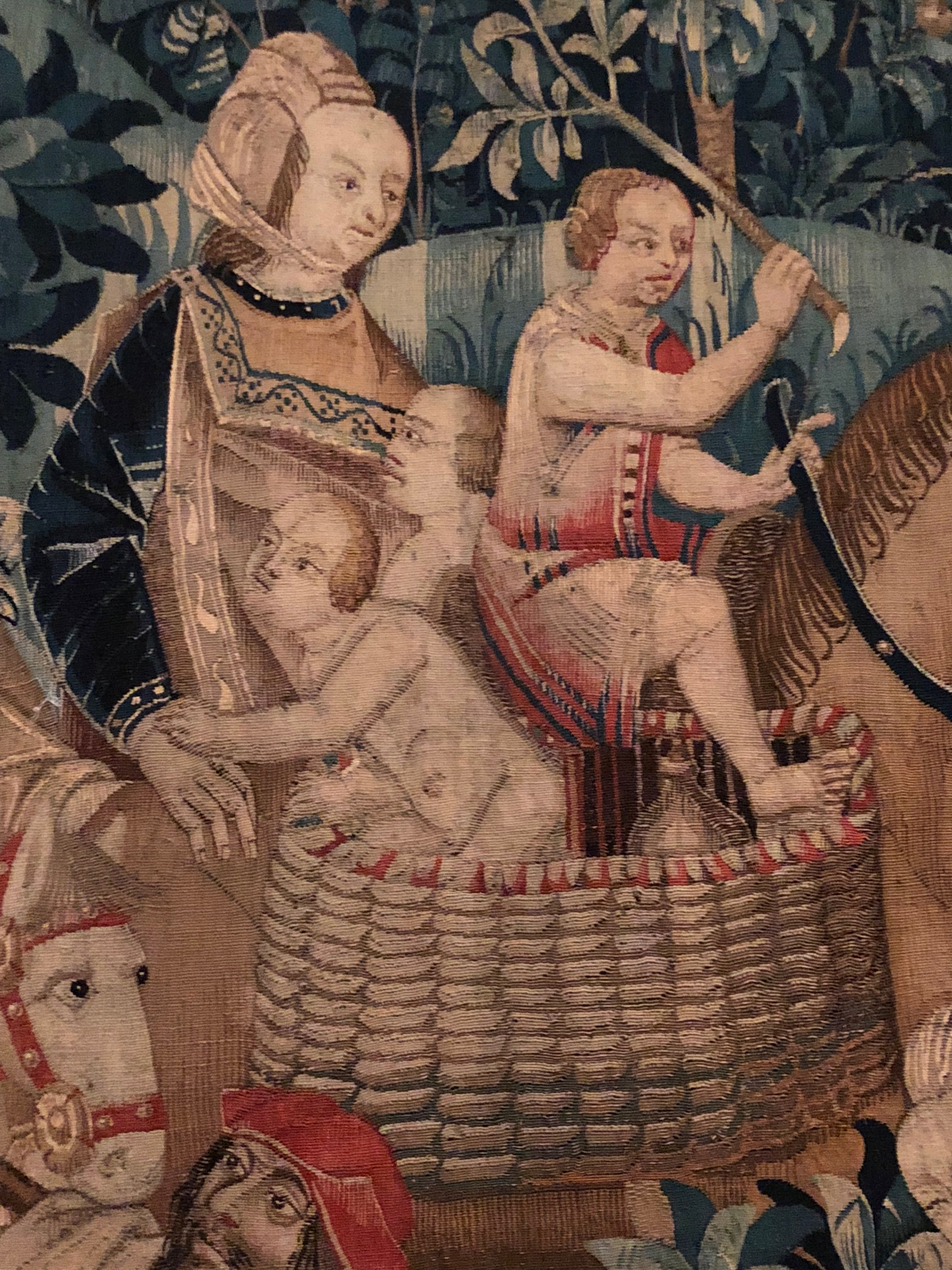
An excerpt from The Visit of the Gypsies (c.1510, tapestry from wool and silk), Currier Museum of Art

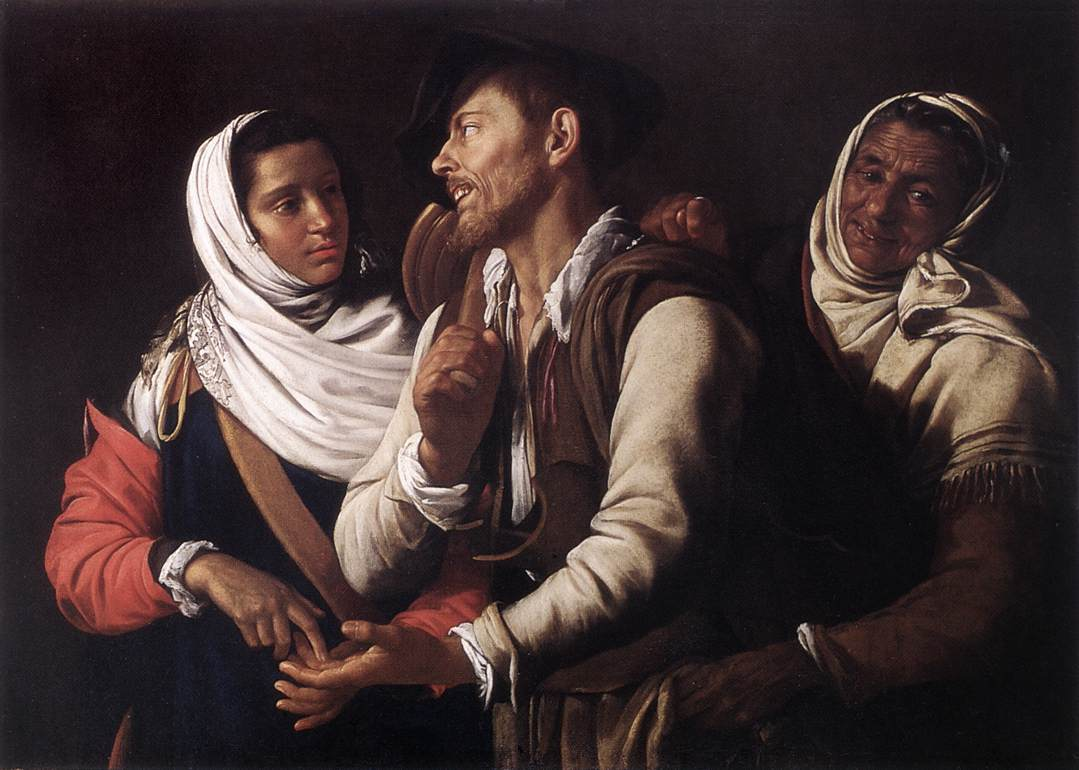
Simon Vouet: The Fortune Teller (1617)

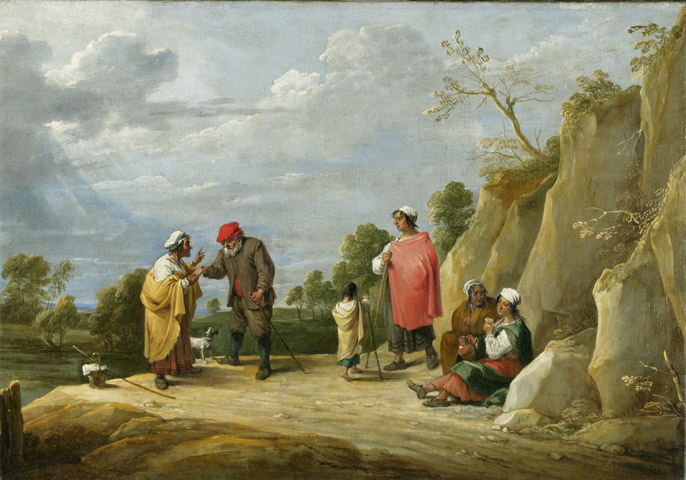
David Teniers – Four Gypsies with a Child, One Telling a Peasant His Fortune (c.1630–1690)

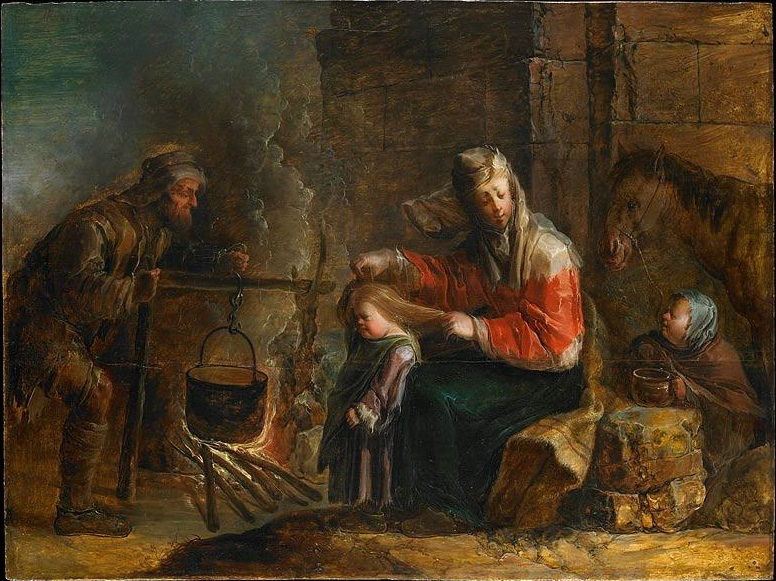
Jan van de Venne – Gypsy Family (c.1631–1651)

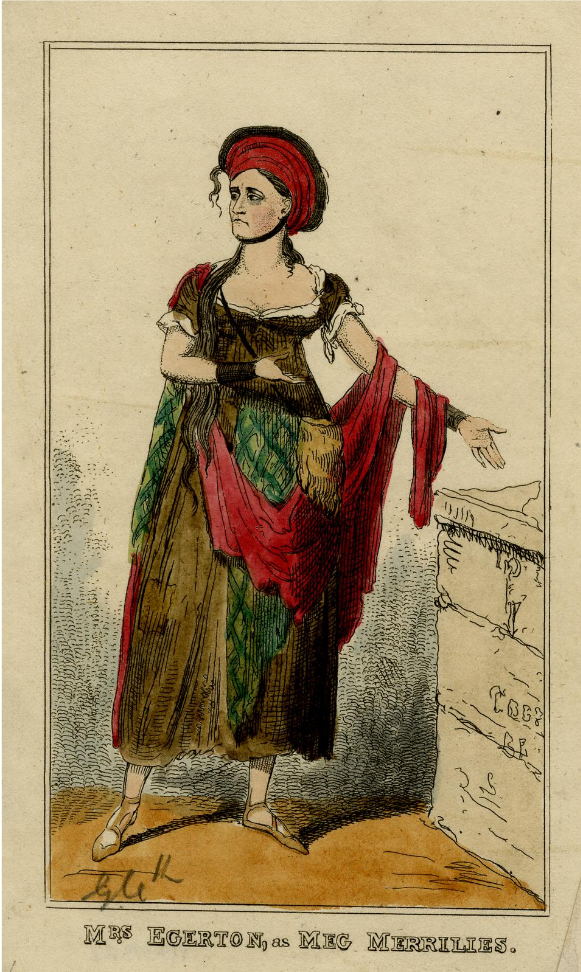
Meg Merrilies from Walter Scott's Guy Mannering, illustrated 1821

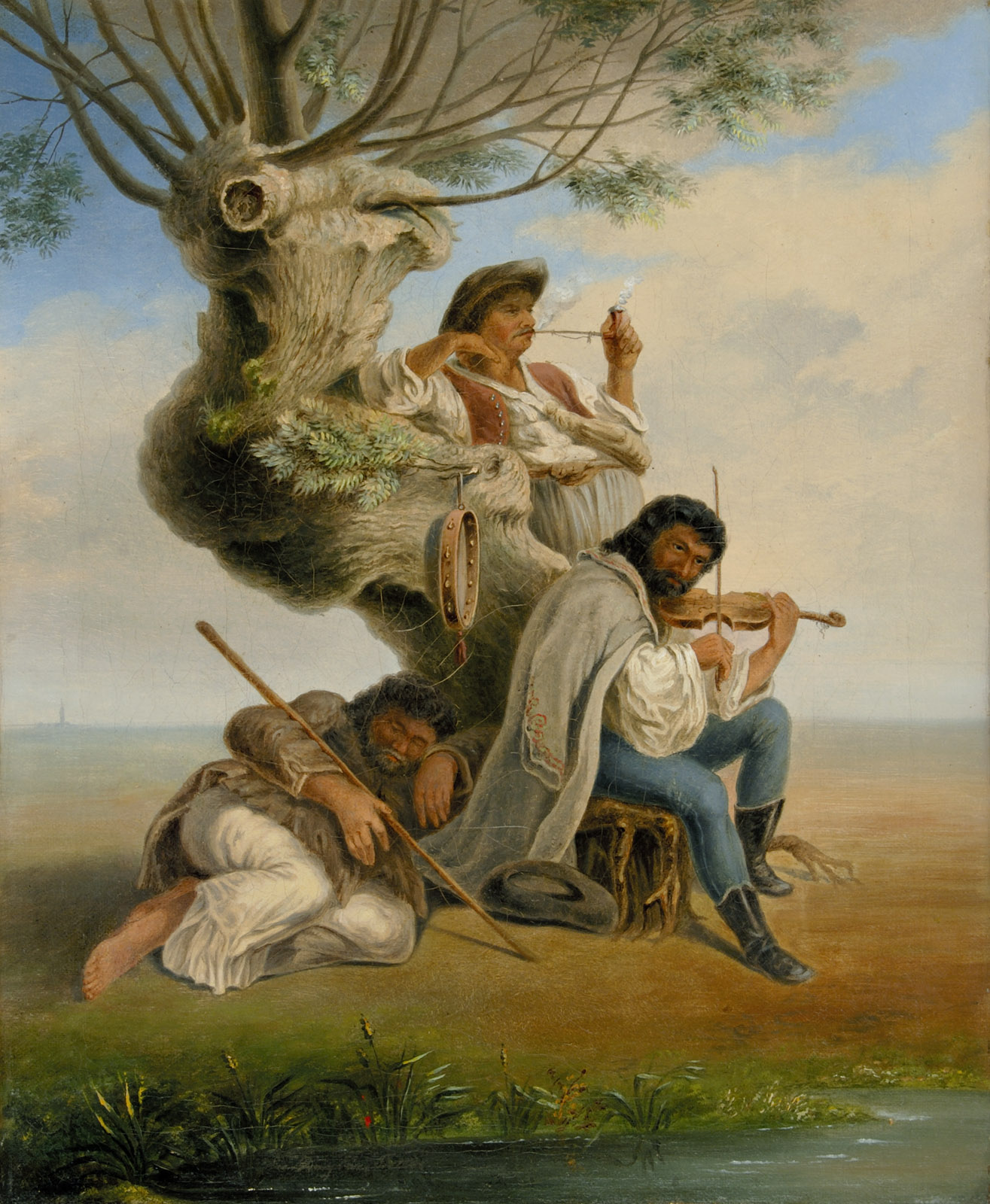
Ferencz Pongrácz: Three Gypsies (1836)

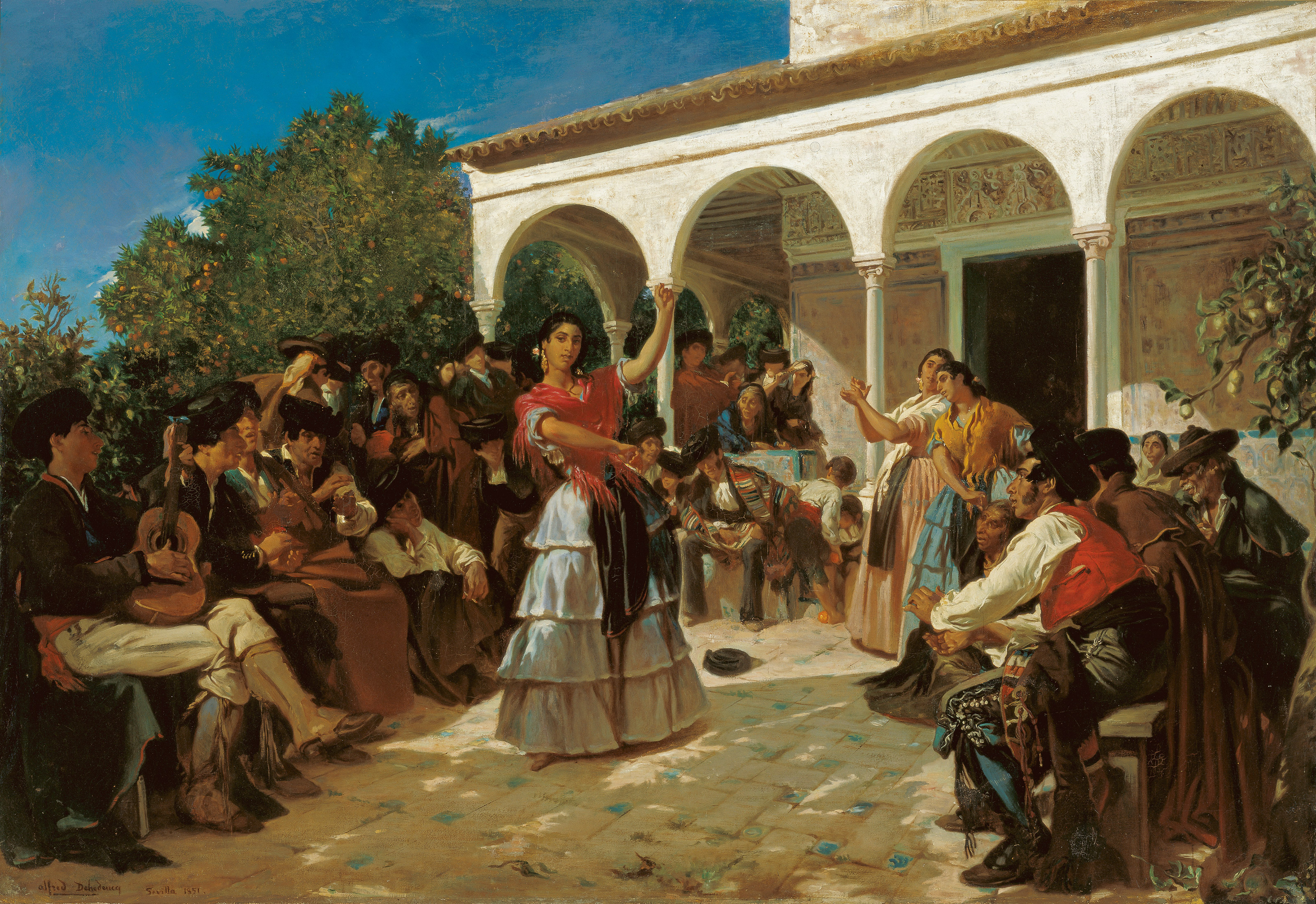
Alfred Dehodencq: A Gypsy Dance in the Gardens of Alcázar (1851)

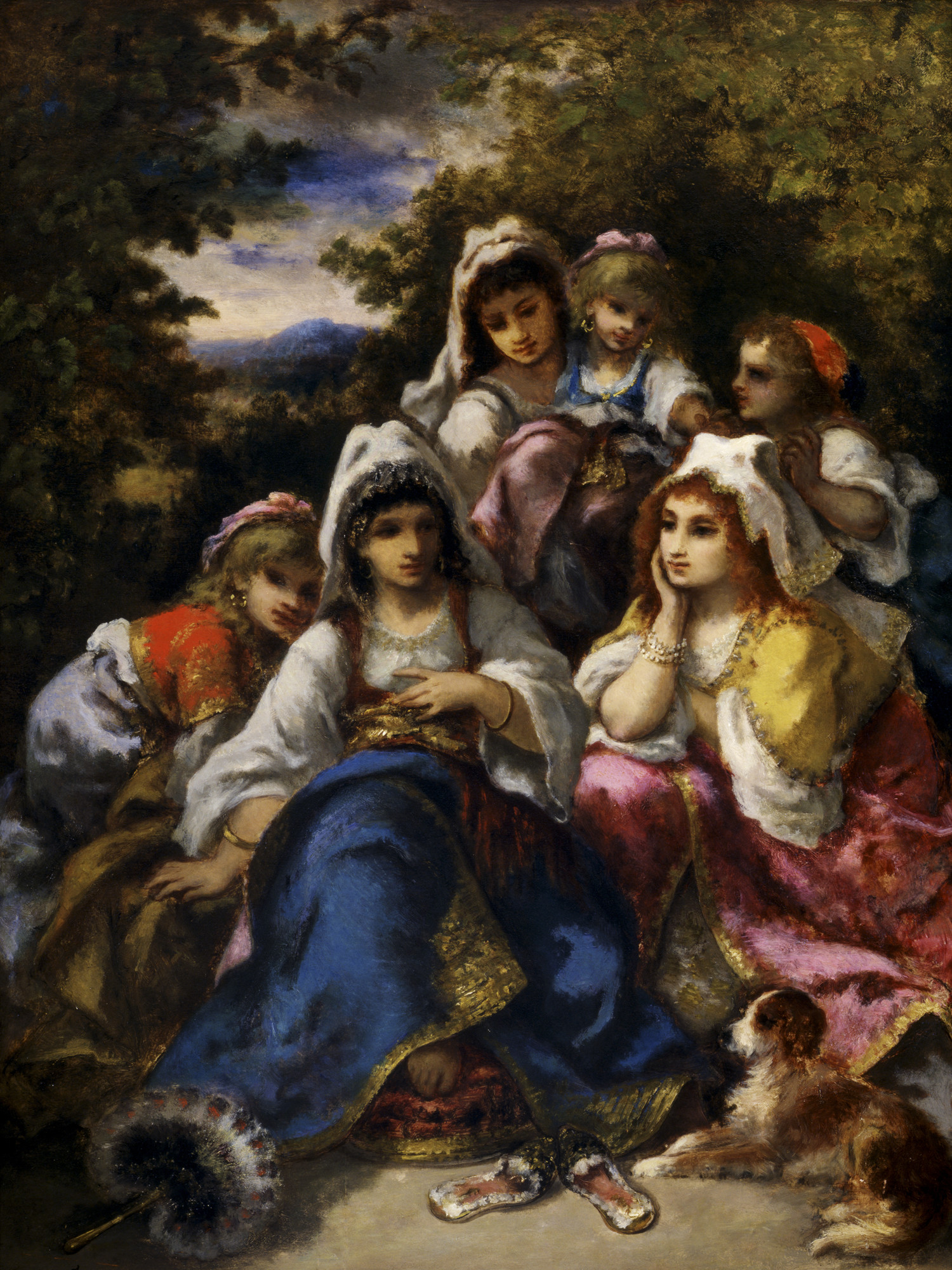
Narcisse Virgilio Díaz: The Gypsy Princesses (c.1865–1870), San Antonio Museum of Art

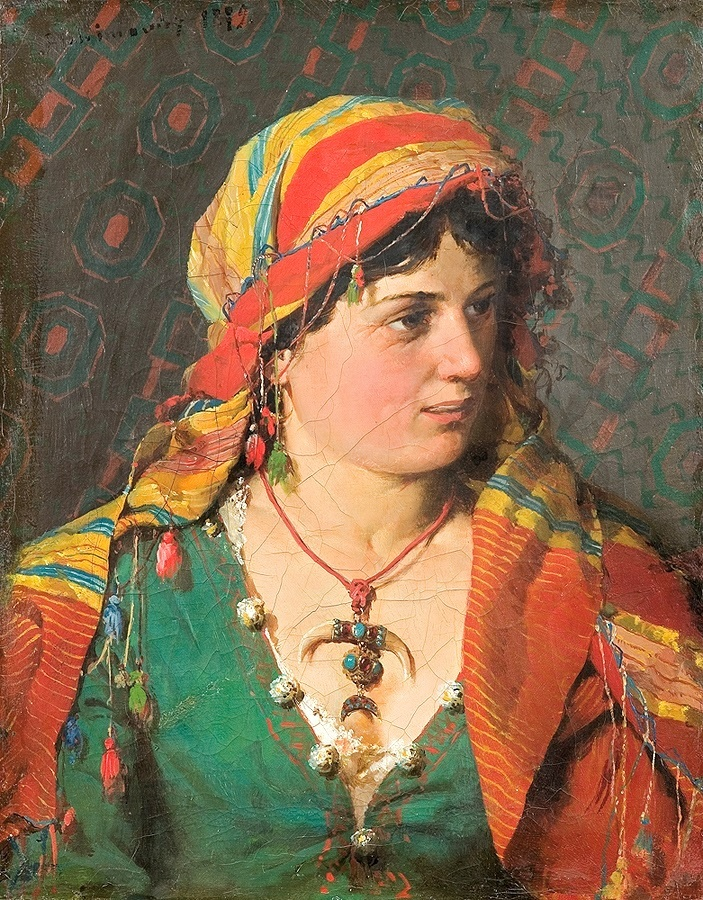
Kazimierz Alchimowicz: Gypsy (c.1870–1879)

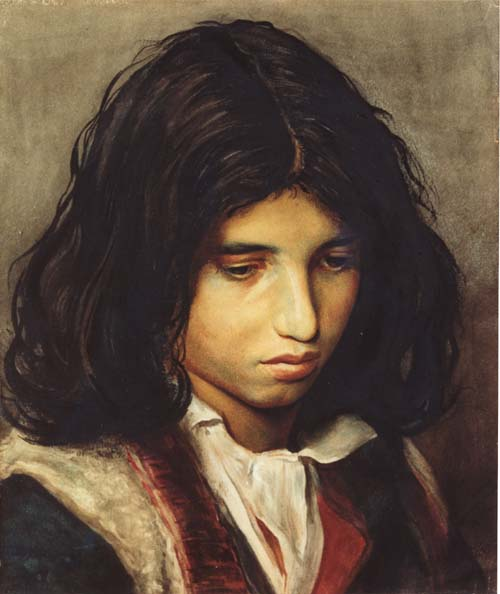
Franz von Defregger: Half Portrait of a Gypsy Boy (1873, gouache)

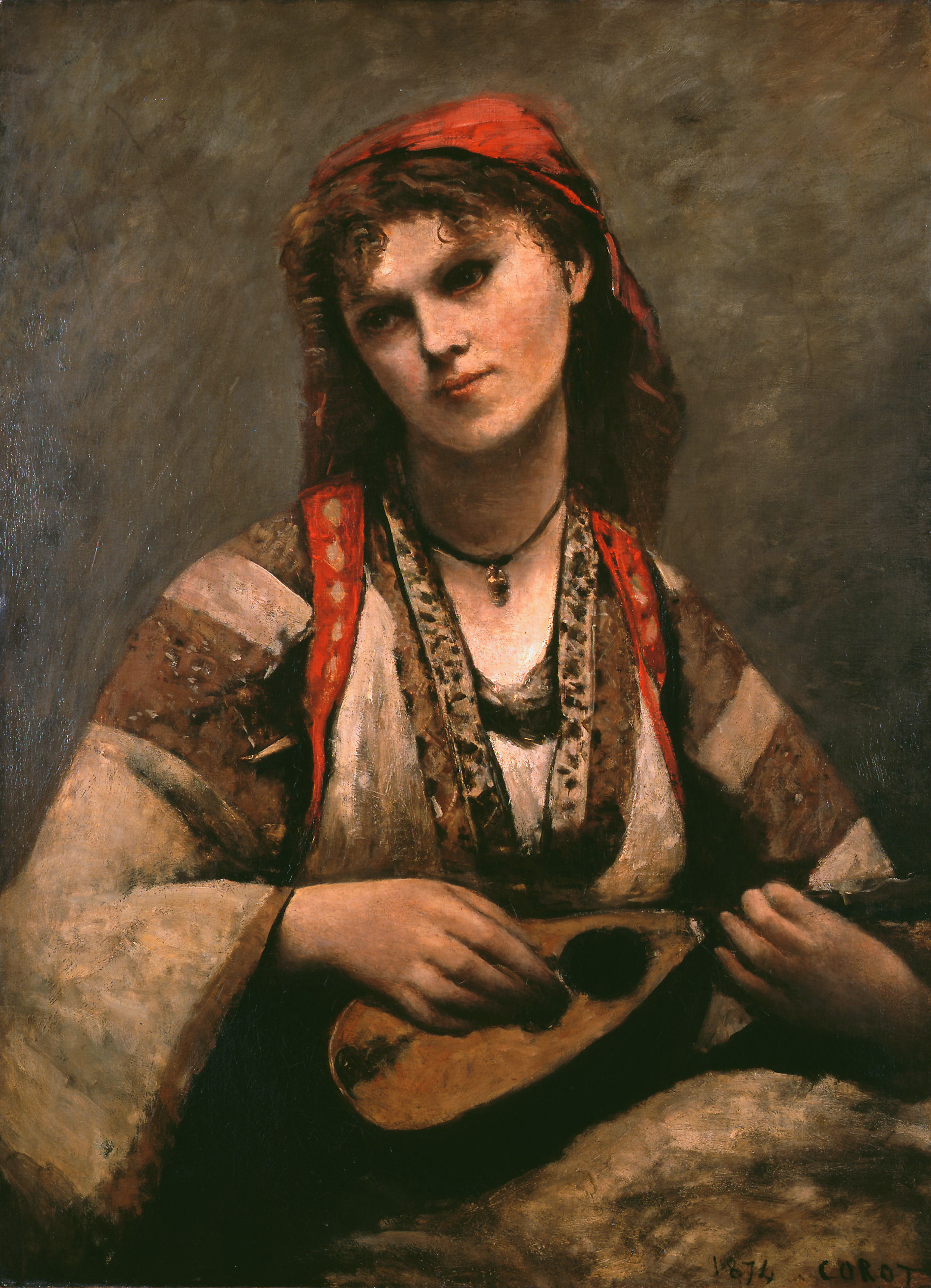
Jean-Baptiste-Camille Corot: Gypsy Girl with Mandolin (1874)

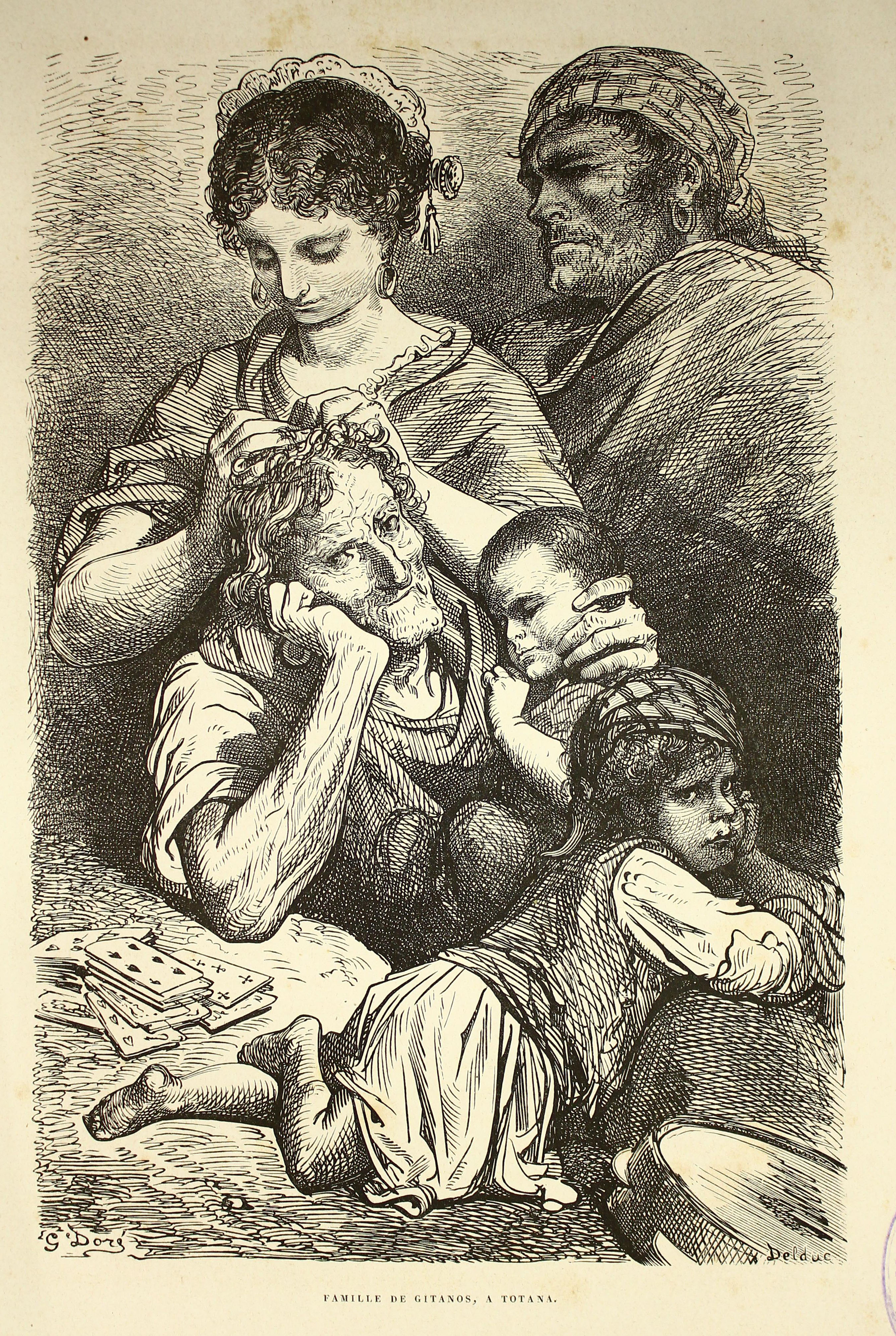
Gustave Doré: Family of Gypsies, to Totana (1874)

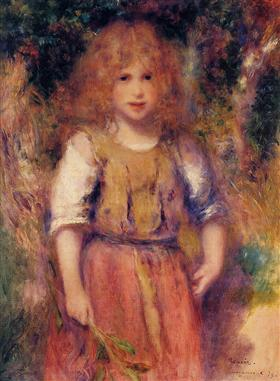
Pierre-Auguste Renoir: Gypsy Girl (1879)

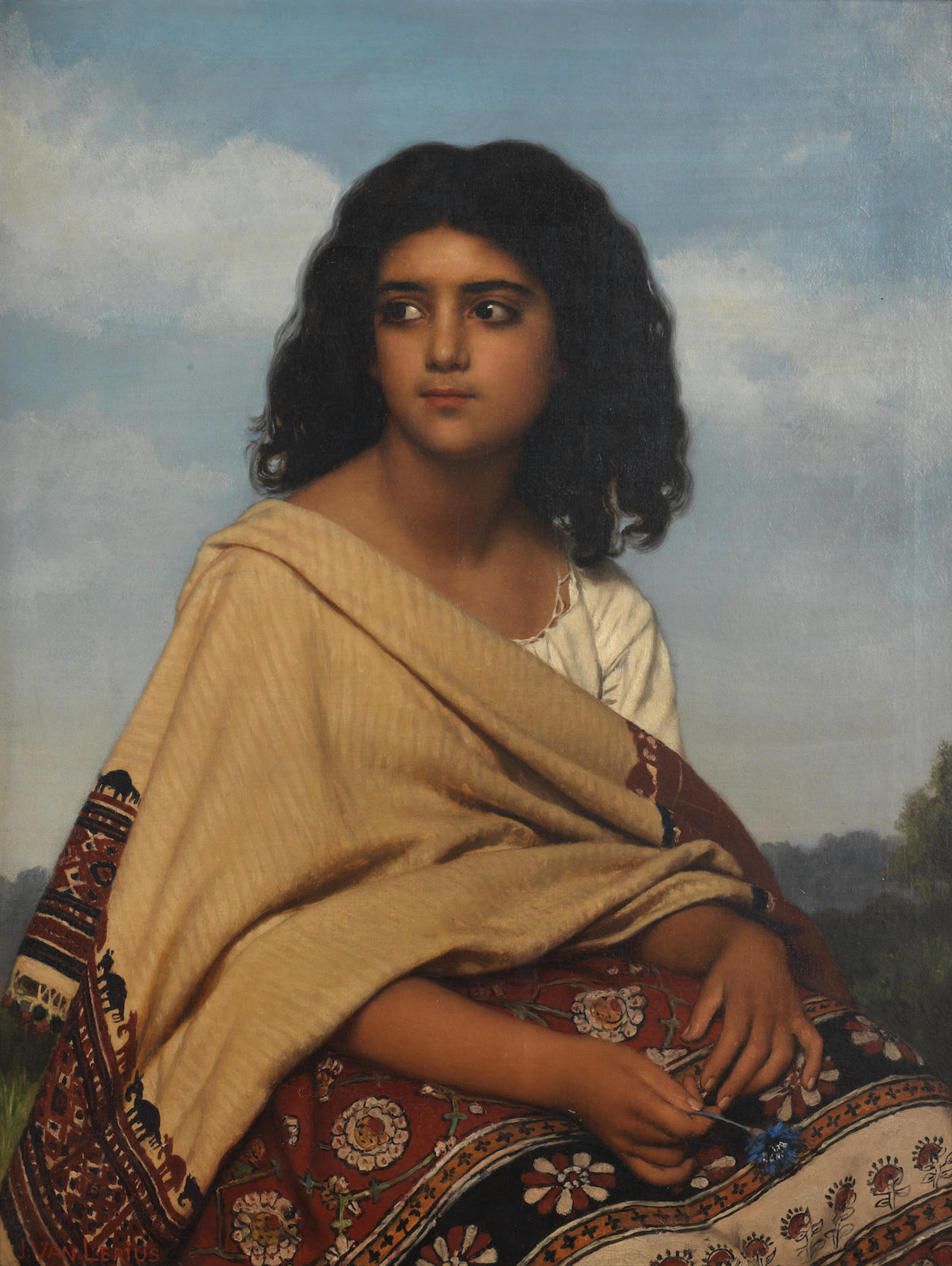
Jozef Van Lerius: Moza, the Gypsy woman (1880)

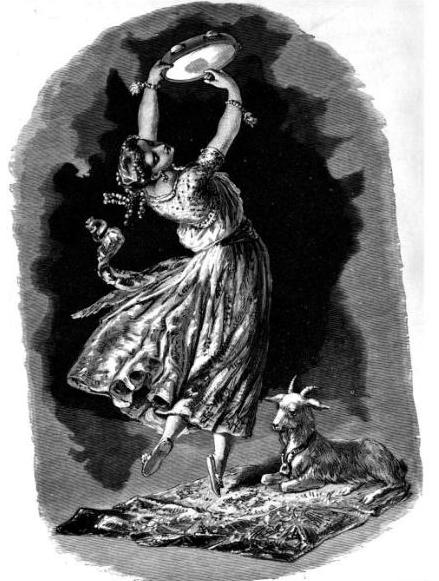
Esméralda, illustrated 1882

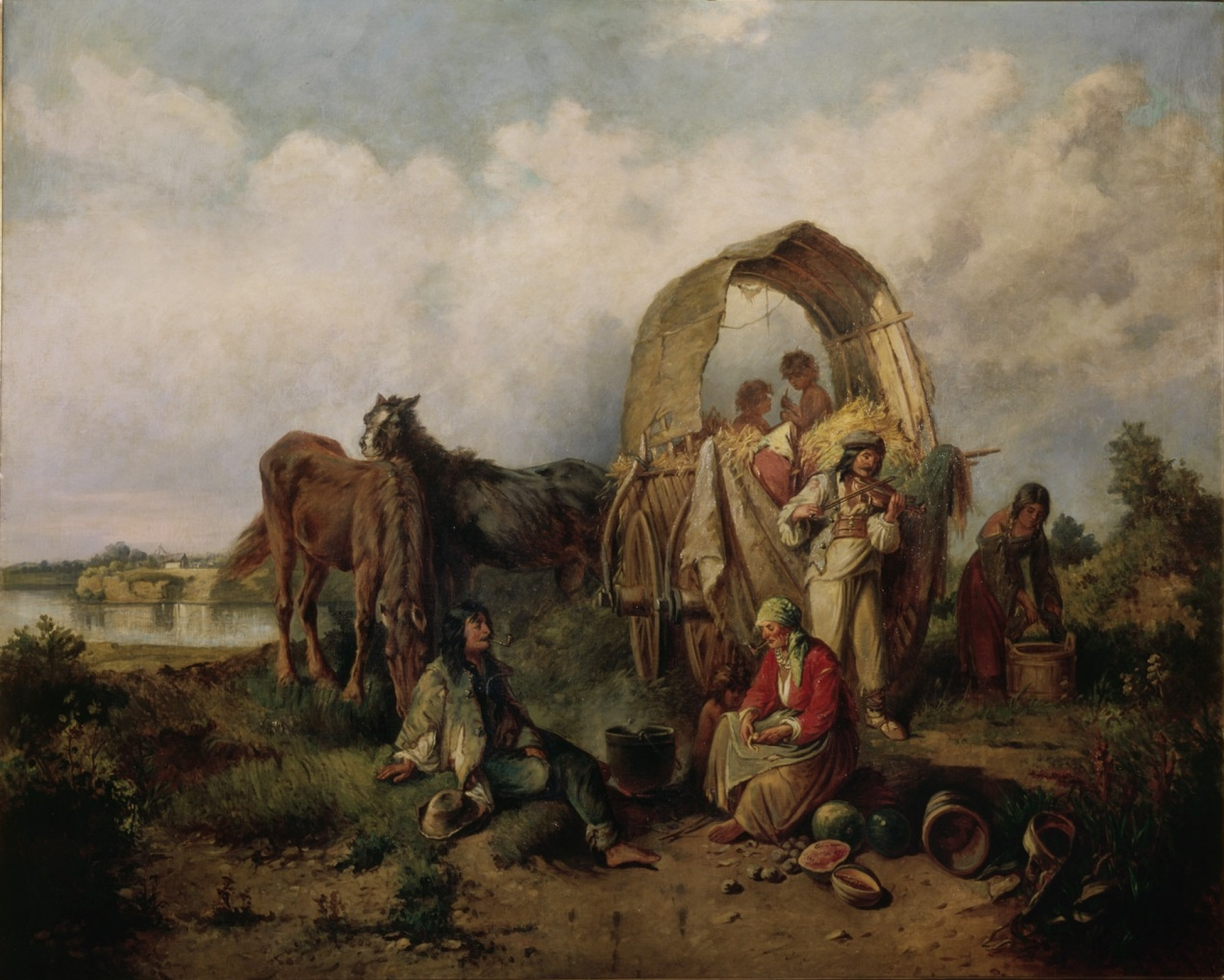
Mihály Munkácsy: Gypsy Family (1884, oil on canvas)

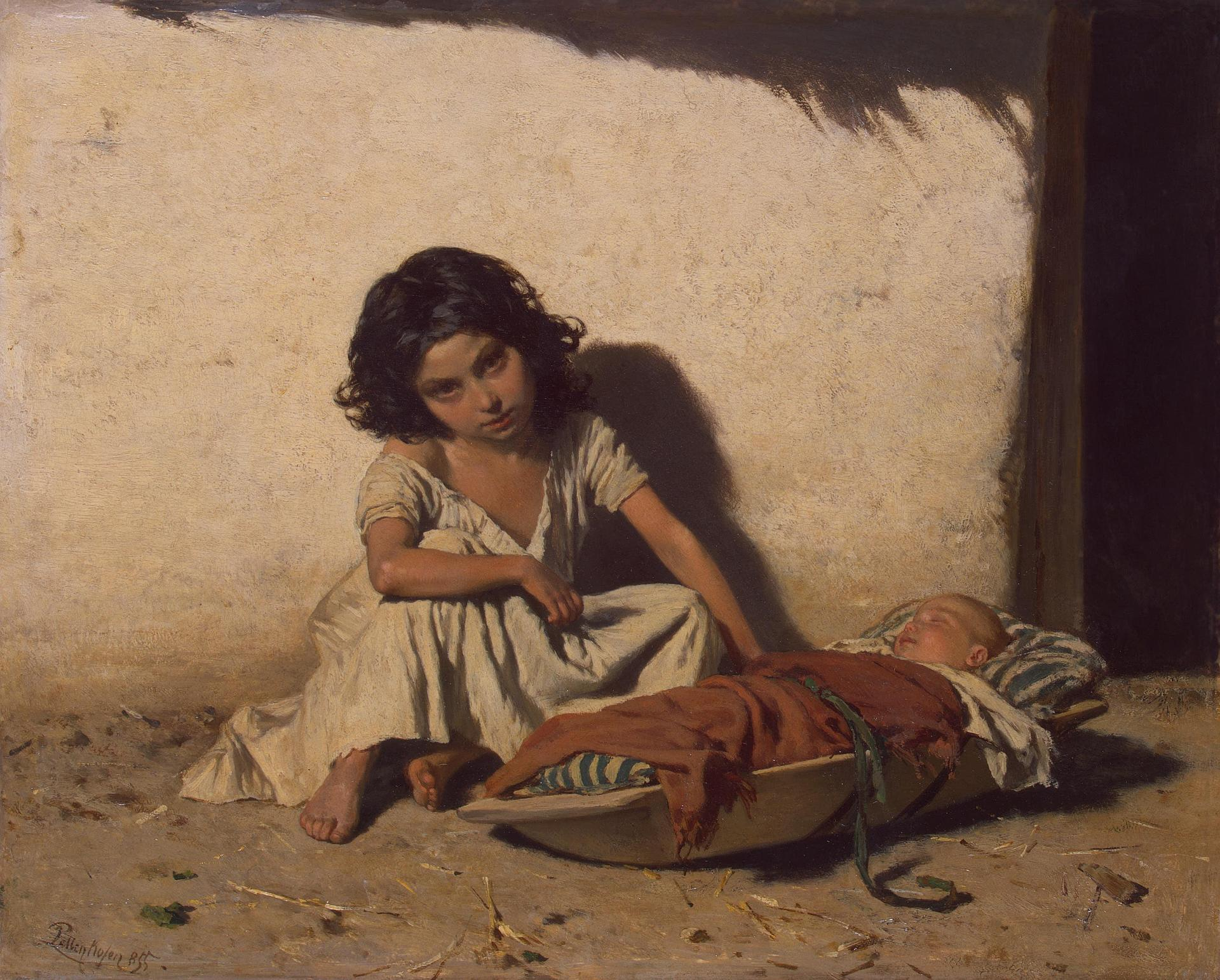
August von Pettenkofen: Gypsy Children (1885), Hermitage Museum

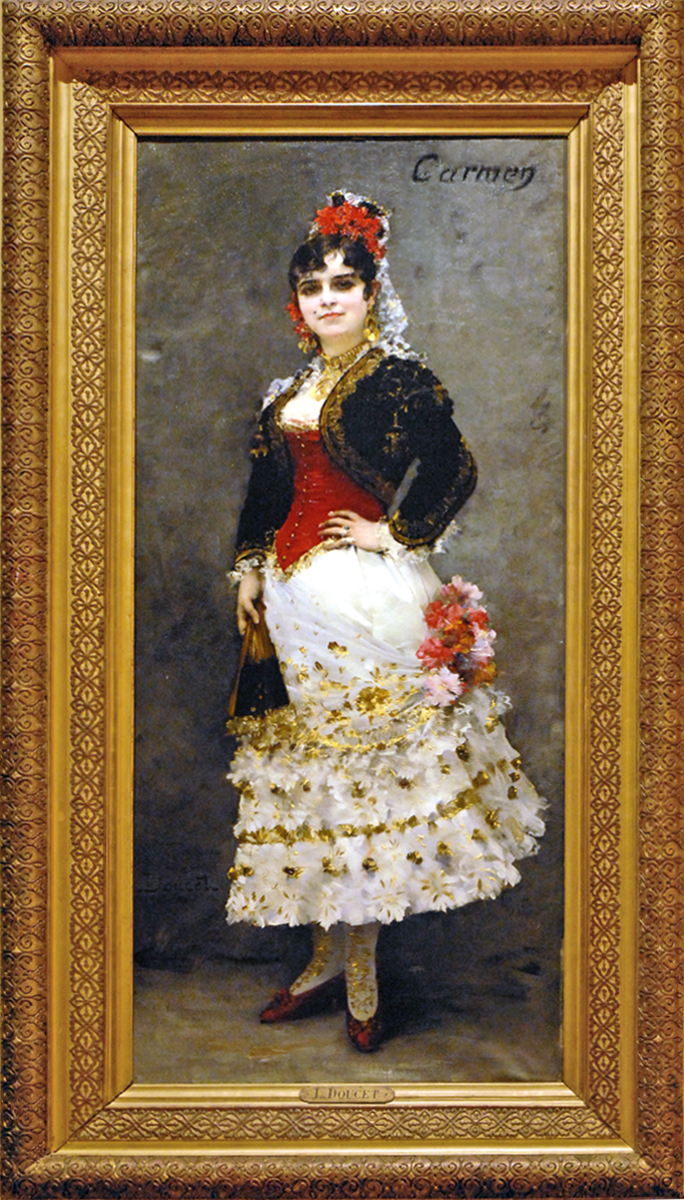
Célestine Galli-Marié as Carmen (1886)

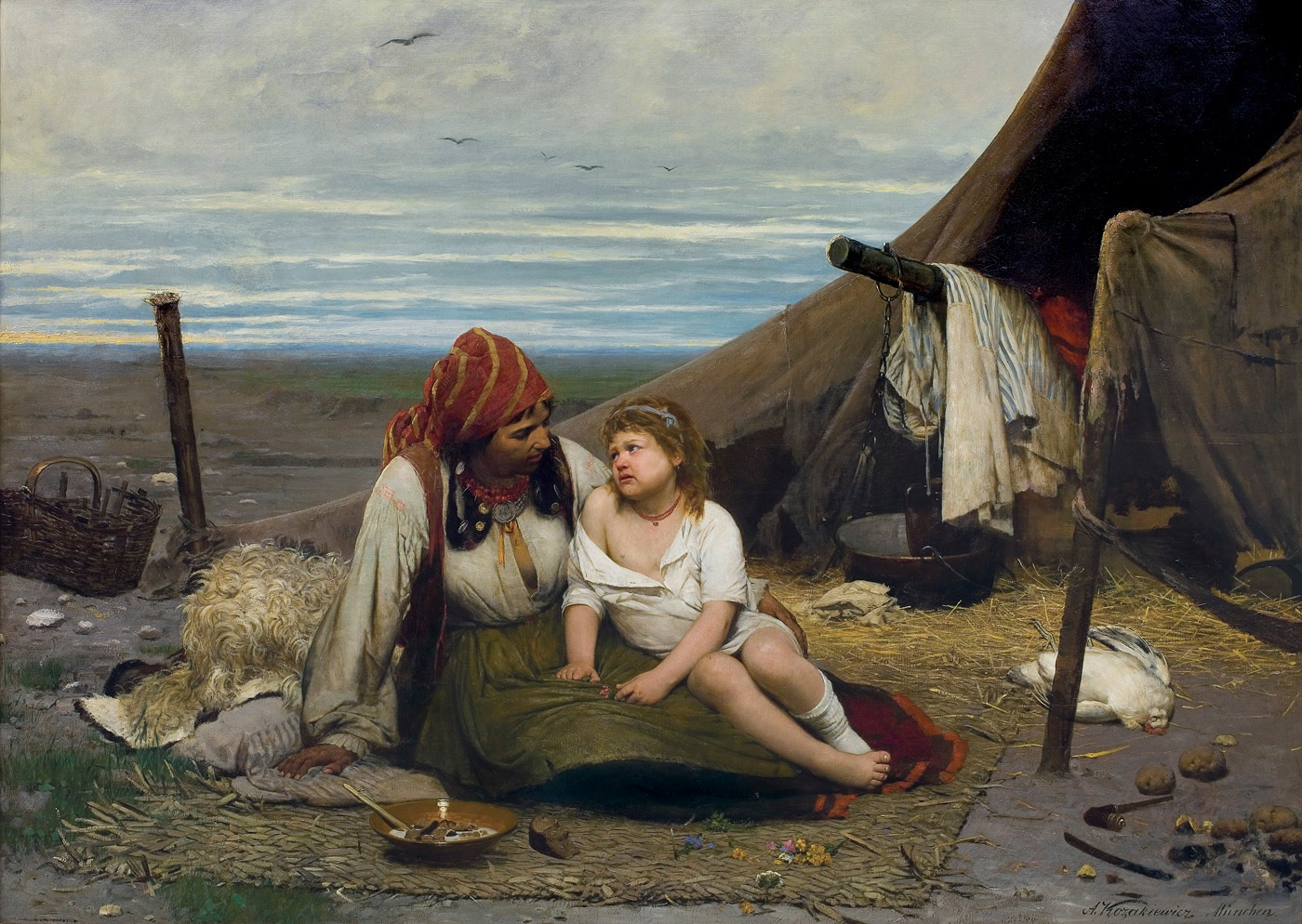
Antoni Kozakiewicz: Gypsy Family (c.1886)

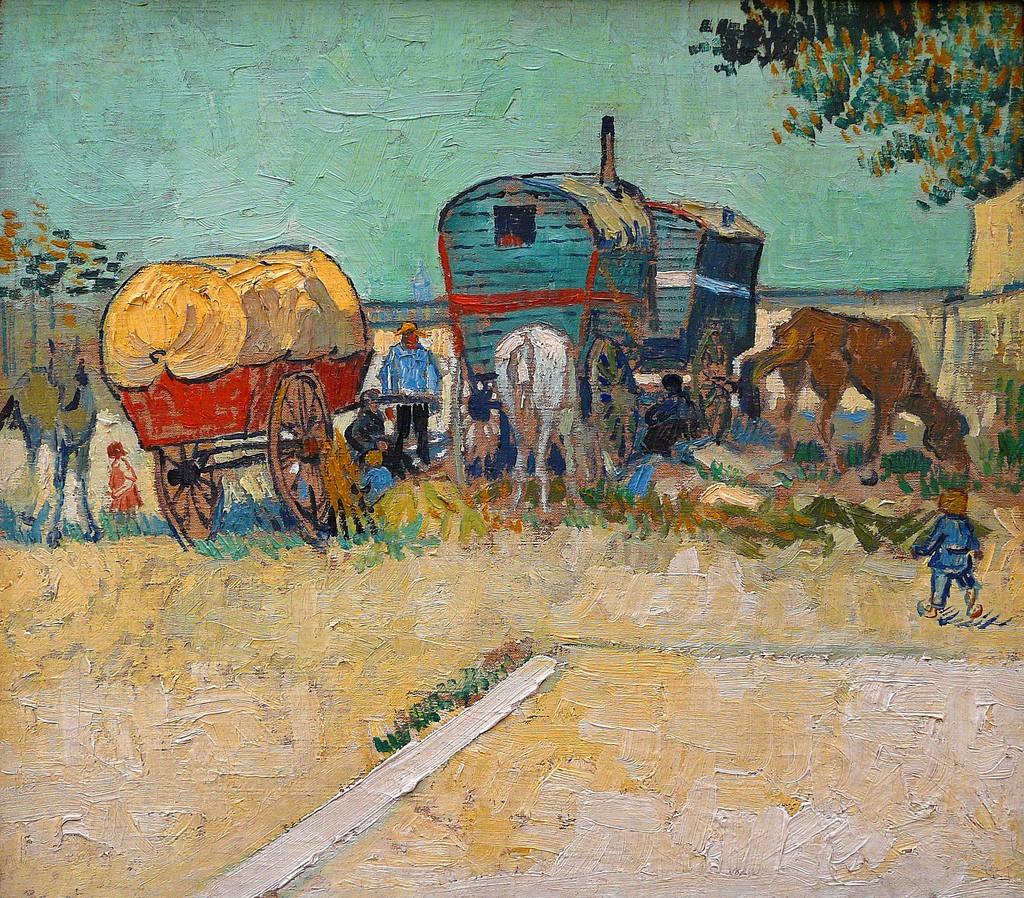
Vincent van Gogh: The Caravans – Gypsy Camp near Arles (1888, oil on canvas)

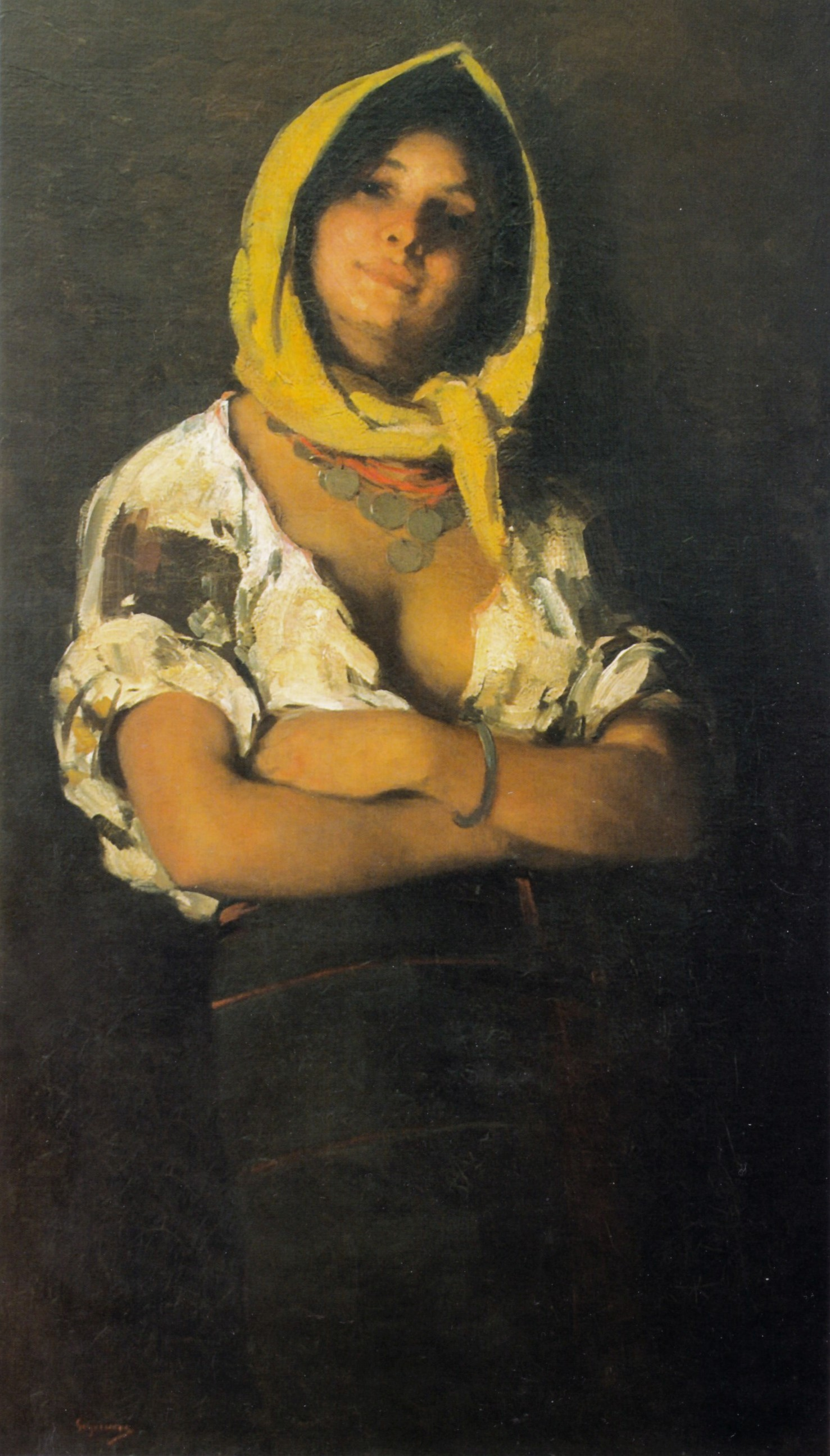
Nicolae Grigorescu: Gypsy from Boldu (1897), Art Museum of Iași

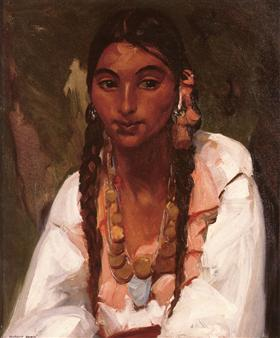
Robert Henri: Gypsy Girl in White (1916)

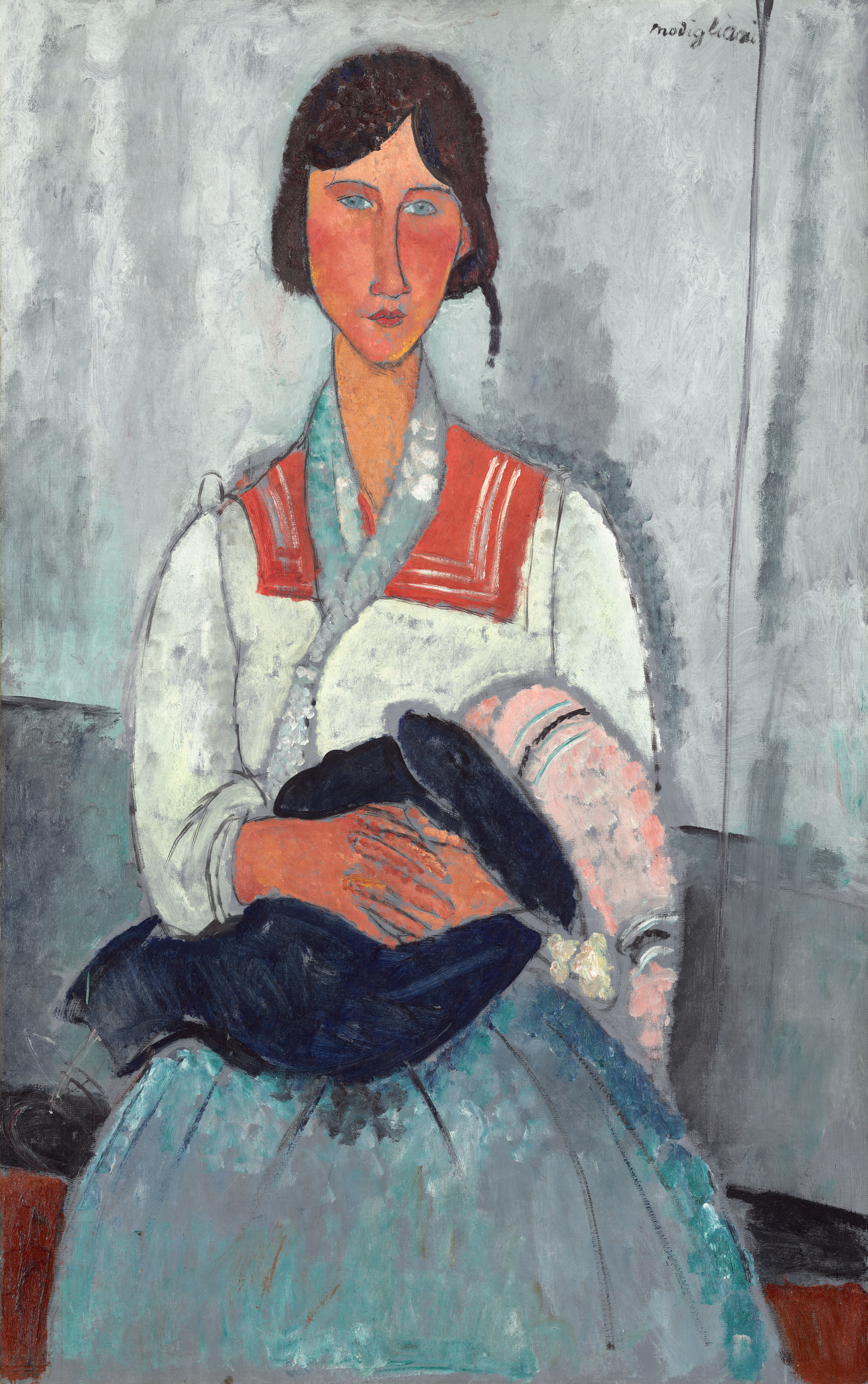
Amedeo Modigliani: Gypsy Woman with Baby (1919)

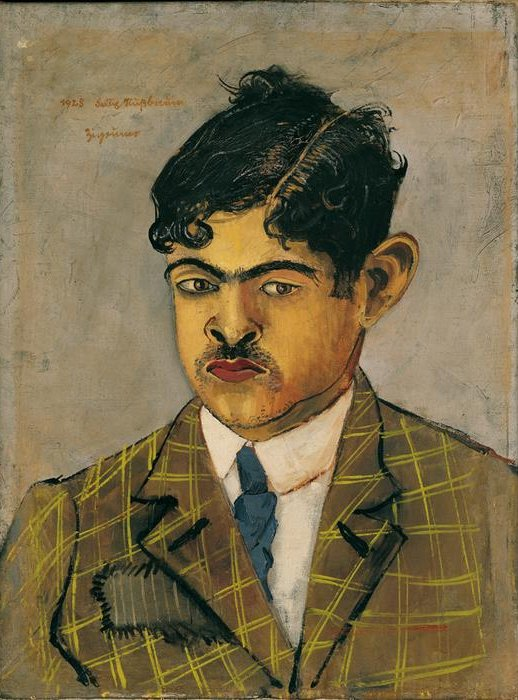
Felix Nussbaum: Gypsy (1928)

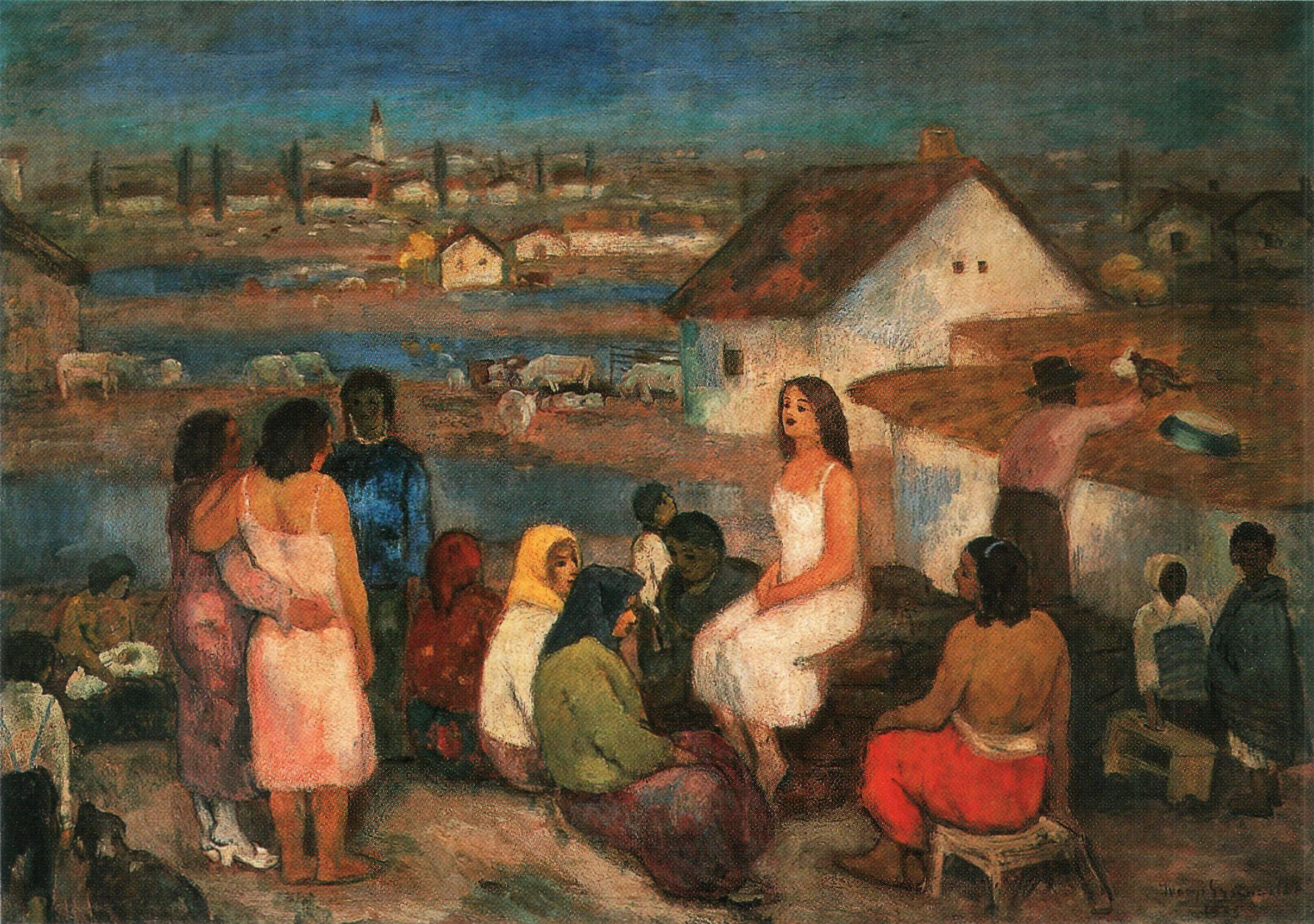
Béla Iványi-Grünwald: Gypsies at Balatonlelle (1935)

== See also ==
- History of the Romani people
- Romani people in Spain
- Gypsy Scourge
- King of the Gypsies
- Romani studies
- Romani society and culture
- Romani literature
- Romani dress
- Romani diaspora
- Racism in Europe
- Ethnic groups in Europe
- Environmental racism in Europe
- Romani folklore
- Romani cuisine
- Sinti
- The Blond Angel Case

General

- Itinerant groups in Europe
- Nomadic tribes in India
- Dalit

Lists

- List of Romani people
- List of Romani settlements

Other

- Dom people
- Lom people
- South Asian people
- South Asian diaspora
- Lori people
- Indo-Roman relations

== Sources ==
- Achim, Viorel (2004). The Roma in Romanian History. Budapest: Central European University Press. ISBN 978-963-9241-84-8.
- Fraser, Angus (1992), The Gypsies, Oxford, UK: Blackwell, ISBN 978-0-631-15967-4
- Hancock, Ian (2001), Ame sam e rromane džene, New York: The Open Society Institute
- Helsinki Watch (1991), Struggling for Ethnic Identity: Czechoslovakia's Endangered Gypsies, New York: Helsinki Watch
- Hübshmanová, Milena (2003). "Roma – Sub Ethnic Groups". Rombase. Karl-Franzens-Universität Graz. Archived from the original on 11 December 2022.
- Lemon, Alaina (2000). Between Two Fires: Gypsy Performance and Romani Memory from Pushkin to Post-Socialism. Durham: Duke University Press. ISBN 978-0-8223-2456-0.
- Matras, Yaron; Popov, Vesselin (2001). Gypsies in the Ottoman Empire. Hatfield: University of Hertfordshire Press.
- Matras, Yaron (2005). Romani: A Linguistic Introduction. Cambridge University Press. ISBN 978-0-521-02330-6.
- Matras, Yaron (2002). Romani: A Linguistic Introduction. Cambridge University Press. ISBN 978-0-521-63165-5.
- "Gypsies, The World's Outsiders", National Geographic, pp. 72–101, April 2001
- Nemeth, David J. (2002). The Gypsy-American. Lewiston, NY: Edwin Mellen.
- Sutherland, Ann (1986). Gypsies: The Hidden Americans. Waveland. ISBN 978-0-88133-235-3.
- Silverman, Carol (1995). "Persecution and Politicization: Roma (Gypsies) of Eastern Europe". Cultural Survival Quarterly.
