= Buzescu =

- Commune
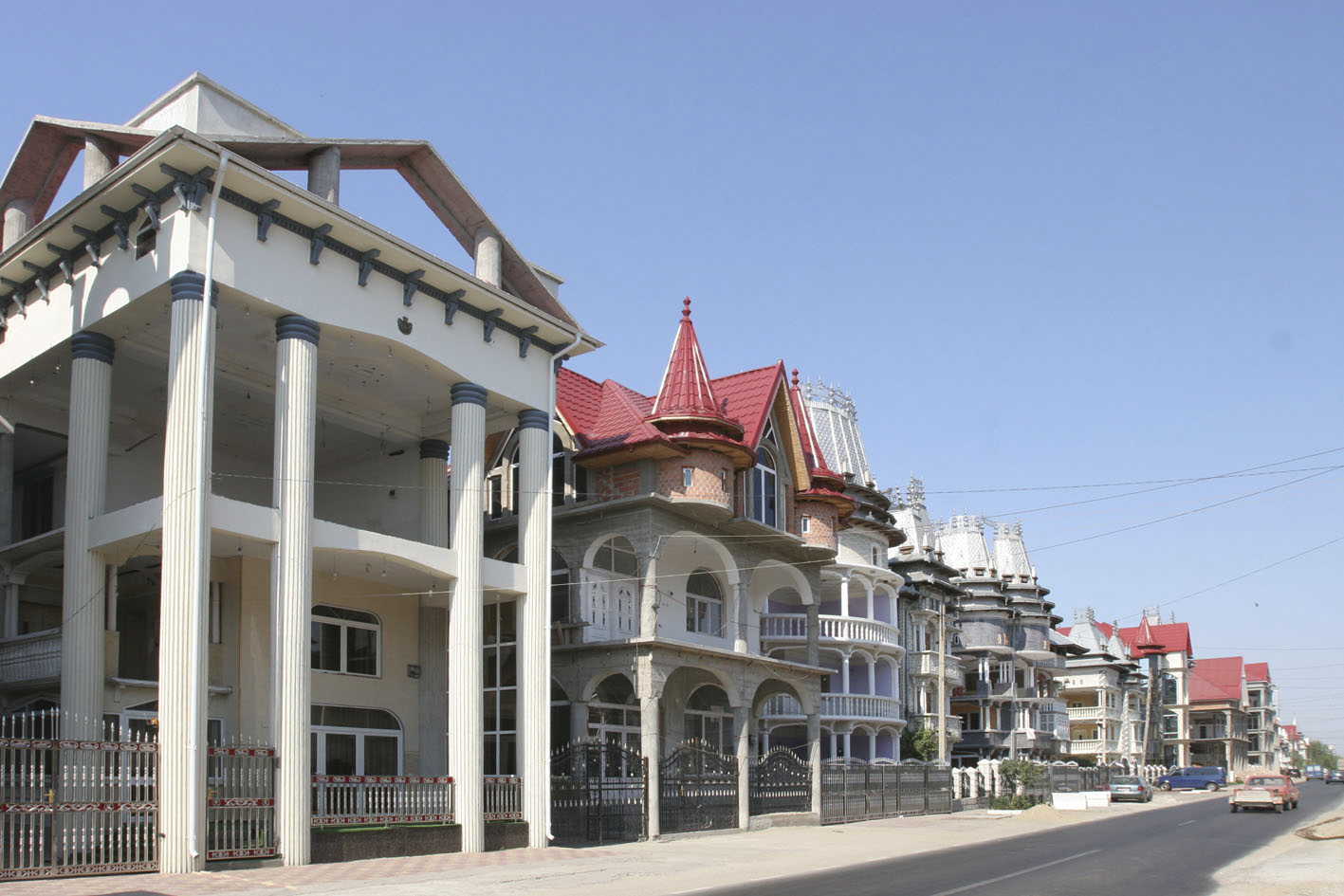
- Main street of Buzescu

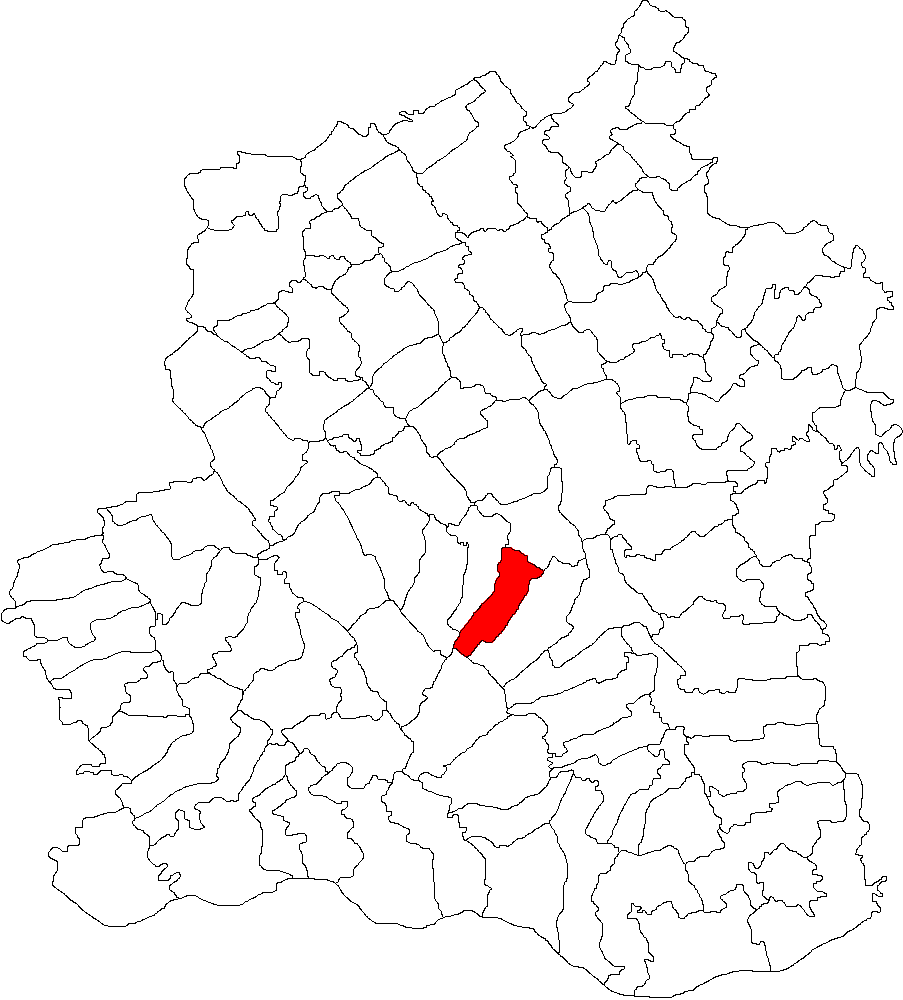
- Location in Teleorman County

- Location in Romania
- Coordinates: 44°01′N 25°14′E
- Country: Romania
- County: Teleorman

Government
  - Mayor (2020–2024): Valentin Trăistaru (PNL)
- Area: 35 km^{2} (14 sq mi)
- Population (2021-12-01): 3,707
  - Density: 110/km^{2} (270/sq mi)
- Time zone: UTC+02:00 (EET)
  - Summer (DST): UTC+03:00 (EEST)
- Postal code: 147050
- Vehicle reg.: TR
- Website: https://www.primaria-buzescu.ro/

Buzescu (Romanian pronunciation: [buˈzesku]) is a commune in Teleorman County, Muntenia, Romania. It is composed of a single village, Buzescu. It is well known for its wealthy Roma inhabitants and their extravagant Romani palaces.

At the 2002 census, 77% of inhabitants were ethnic Romanians and 22.9% Roma. However, more recent estimates place the number at around 35% Roma.

The town runs along a single street filled with various Romani mansions. Most Romanians live outside the town in the surrounding rural area. The Romani usually only occupy a portion of their houses due to the cost of air conditioning. The Romani citizens abide by their own code of honor that emphasizes silence called omerta.

In terms of religious affiliation, 94.9% identified as Romanian Orthodox and 4.7% as Seventh-day Adventist.

== History ==
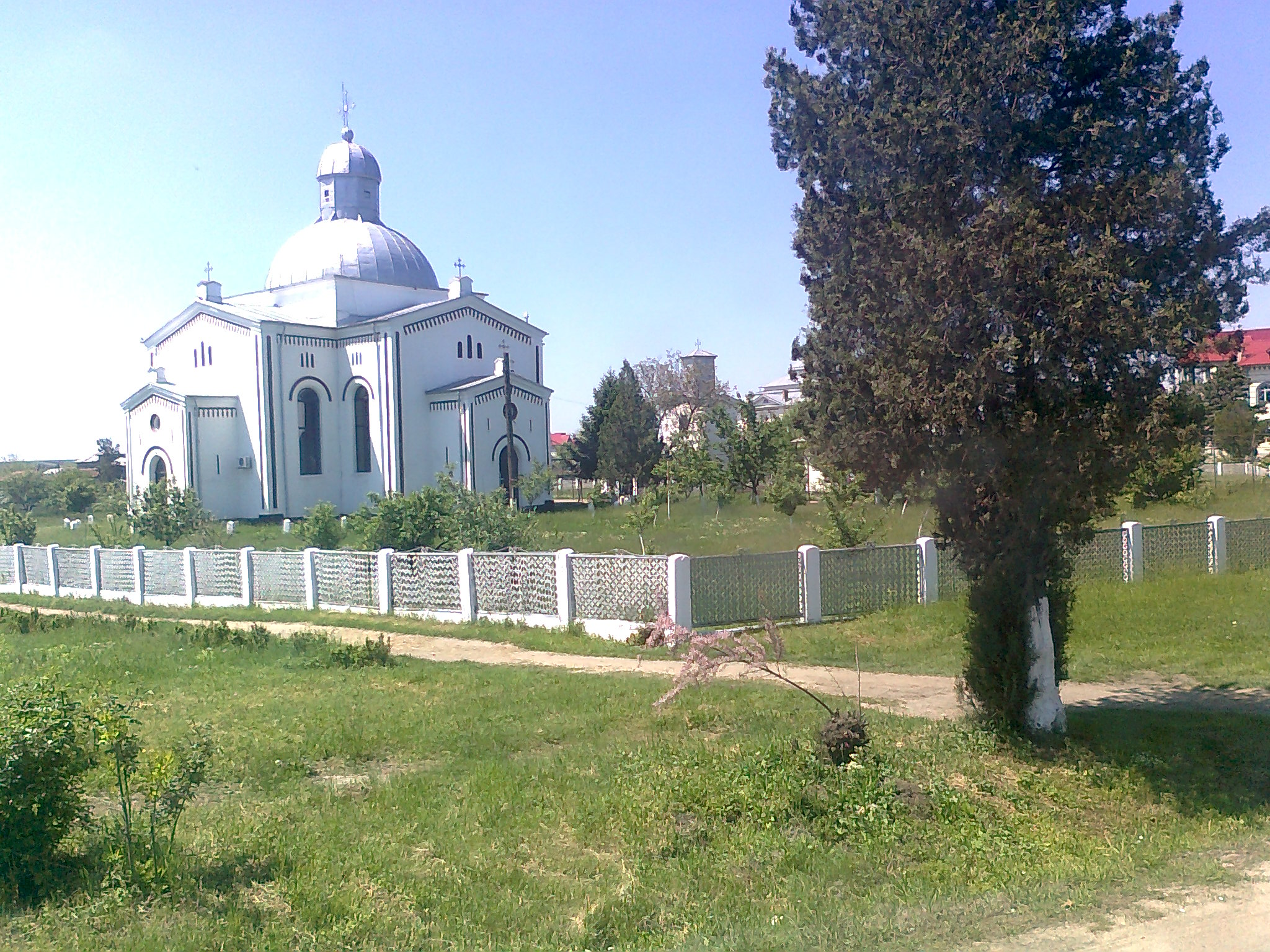
The main church in Buzescu built in 1860

Following the abolition of slavery in Romania in the 1860s, the first recently freed Roma families settled in this part of Romania to work as metal smiths. Because of this profession they became known as the Kalderash clan. Nowadays, the town has changed much with the new extravagant mansions of wealthy Roma that contrast with the rural cottages of Romanian peasants in the countryside. The Kalderash Roma of the town are said to have made their wealth trading scrap metal in a previously unregulated market. However, since Romania joined the European Union more regulations have been put on this trade and only a handful of Buzescu’s families are extremely wealthy.

== Tourism and culture ==
Buzescu’s unique architecture attracts many western tourists interested in the Romani culture. Each building represents the family that lives in it through the use of certain colors in combination with lines or elements of oriental architecture. The size of the building represents the wealth and social standing of its owner. In addition, the Kalderash Roma of Buzescu adhere strictly to cultural clothing practices. Each cultural costume has a certain significance. The colors of the costume worn by women and girls, the number of skirts, and the color and ornamentation of the shirts, all are significant in the Kalderash Romani culture. Tourists have the opportunity to understand the significance of each color in relation to the age of the person wearing that particular object plus the knowledge about Romani family life and customs. Jewellery, especially made of gold, accompany the traditional outfit, individualizing each person.
