= Romani dress =

Romani traditional clothing

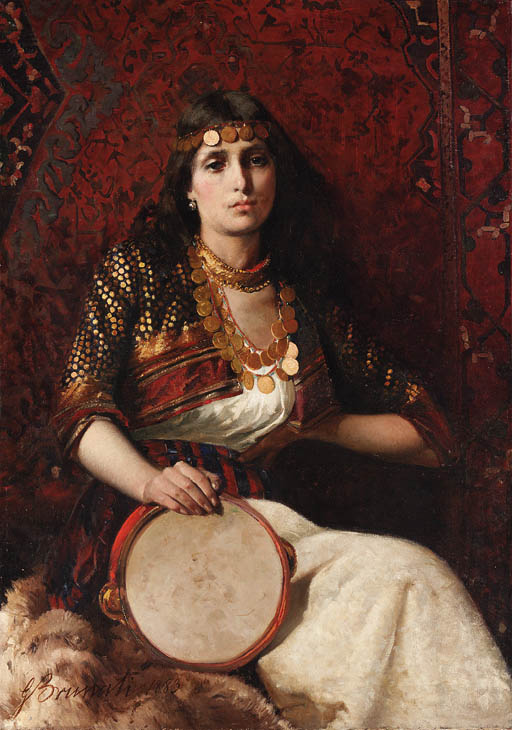
Gypsy Woman by Gabriele Brunati, 1883

Romani dress is the traditional attire of the Romani people, an Indo-Aryan ethnic group widely known in English by the exonymic term Gypsies, though this term is often considered derogatory by people of Romani descent. (Note: Gypsy is considered by some Roma people to be pejorative and a slur due to its connotations of illegality and irregularity.) Romani traditional clothing is closely connected to the history, culture and identity of the Romani people.

Romani dress can vary drastically among different subgroups. However, there are certain constant similarities that define Romani dress as a whole. Traditionally, certain clothing traditions may have helped them to recognise one another. Moreover, some Romani value the outward display of their wealth and prosperity, which they reflect in their traditional dress.

== Women's clothing ==
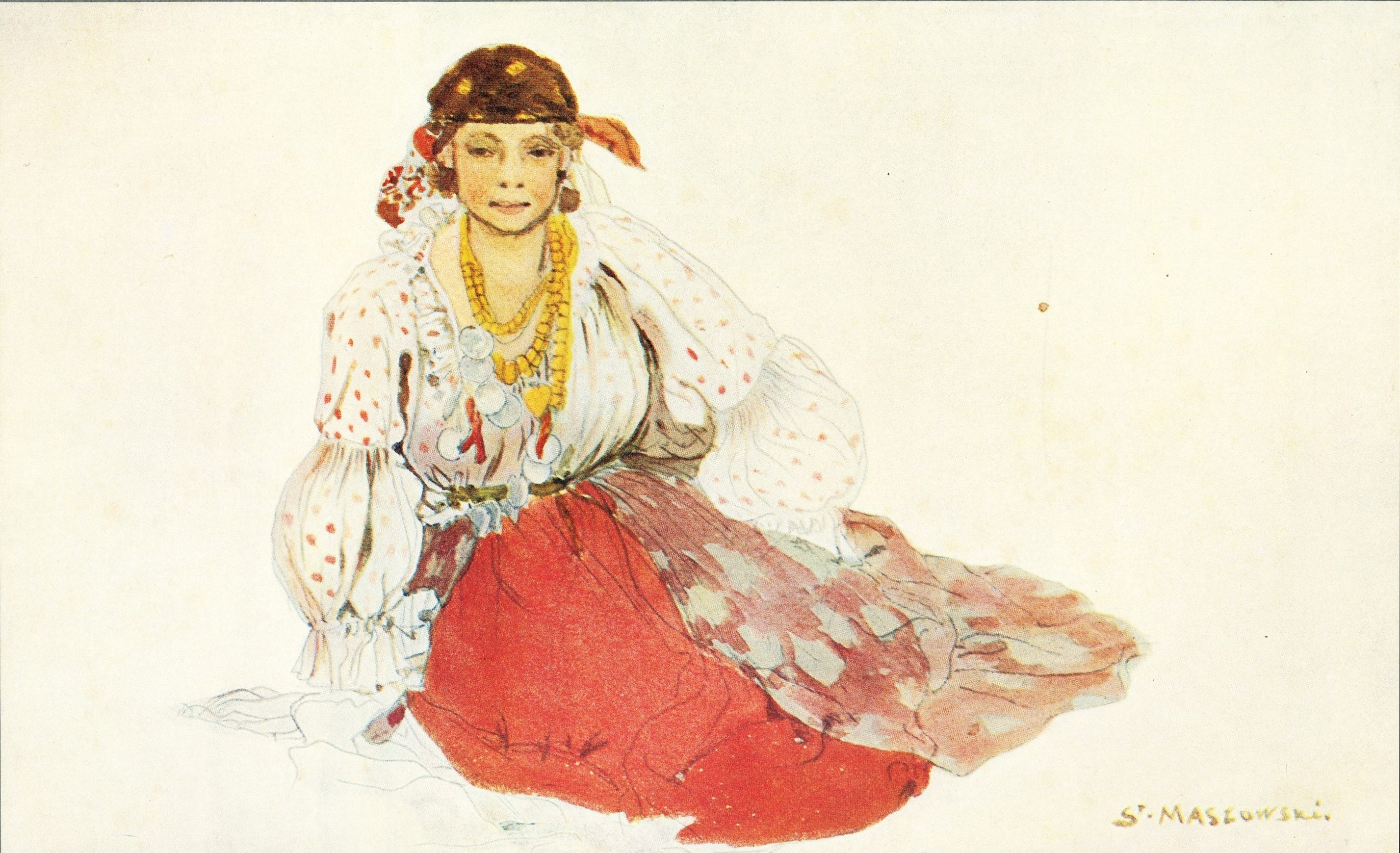
Gypsy Woman by Stanisław Masłowski, 1877

The dress of Romani women emphasizes purity and the Romani notion of being unpolluted, as well as the cultural tradition of displaying your wealth as a sign of good fortune. Romani women tend to wear golden earrings, necklaces and bracelets and headscarves. Their headscarves may be embellished with golden coins. The Diklo is a traditional headscarf worn by married Vlax Romani women.

For the lower body, Romani women traditionally wear skirts, particularly Christian Romani women. The size of the skirts varies among people of different tribes, ages, and marital status. Traditionally, skirts are strictly worn below the knees as the lower body is considered taboo in Romani culture due to the laws of marime. Romani women would also traditionally avoid trousers although this has also changed among the young generation. Additionally, among the Vlax Roma, married women will wear a white apron above their skirt. The apron of a Romani women was in place to protect the food from the dirt of the dress per the cleanliness code of Romani people.

In certain Vlax Romani cultures such as the Gábors, Romani women over the age of 10 are required to wear a dress code that consists of a colourful pleated skirt, colourful blouse with patterns, long pleated apron from the same material as the skirt, and for married women, the kerchief constitute the rule for clothing. Married and young women alike wear a red ribbon in their hair. For footwear, women wear sandals, slippers, boots or shoes. The color of the skirts can reflect a Romani women's status and age with brighter colors being used by younger girls and darker colors by older women. Black skirts are a sign of mourning in the Romani culture.

In the Muslim Romani communities of the Balkans, women of the older generation prefer to wear traditional Romani clothing, while the younger generation tend to dress more conservatively. Muslim Romani women may wear pantaloons called shalvari which vary in fit according to purpose. In Muslim Romani society, the dress code of women is closely monitored and modesty is emphasized, especially when it comes to the lower half of the body.

== Men's clothing ==
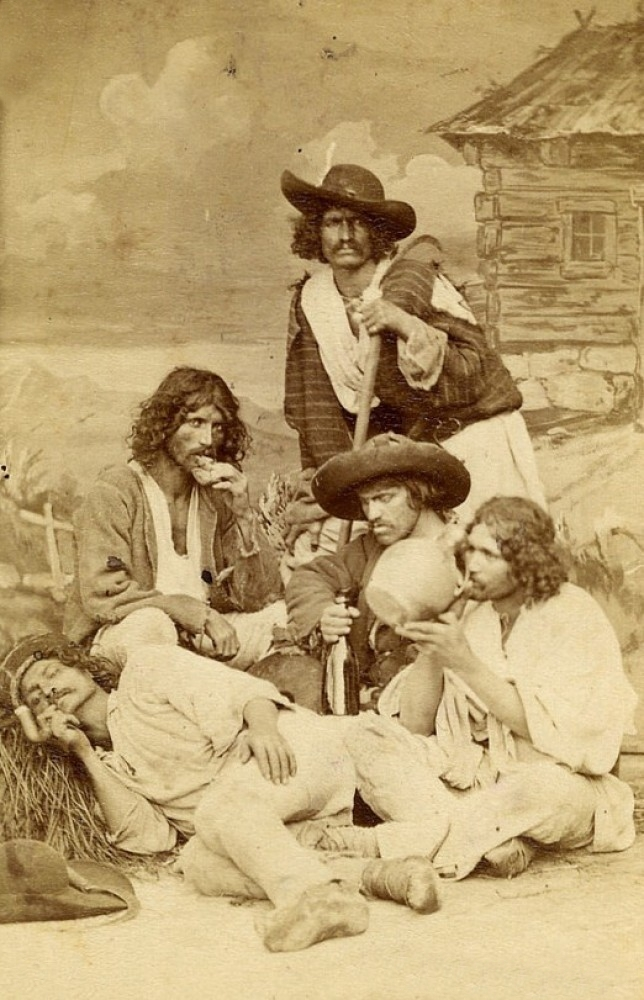
Romani men in Transylvania wearing their traditional dress, 1865

Romani men in urban areas tend to wear shiny suits and ties as a display of fashion, status, and elegance. Romani men often wear golden rings and necklaces as jewelry. The hat and vest of a Romani man is indicative of his tribe and clan affiliation. Because of the Romani stigma surrounding the lower body, Romani men will often avoid wearing shorts.

Romani men's clothing was standard throughout their respective clan and the sharing of clothes between clan members was seen as a symbol of brotherhood.

In certain Vlax Romani cultures such as the Gábors, Men are required to wear a dress code consisting of a broad-brimmed hat, loosely fitting black trousers, a dark overcoat and shirt, and a waistcoat with silver buttons. For footwear, men wear black closed shoes.

== Persecution ==
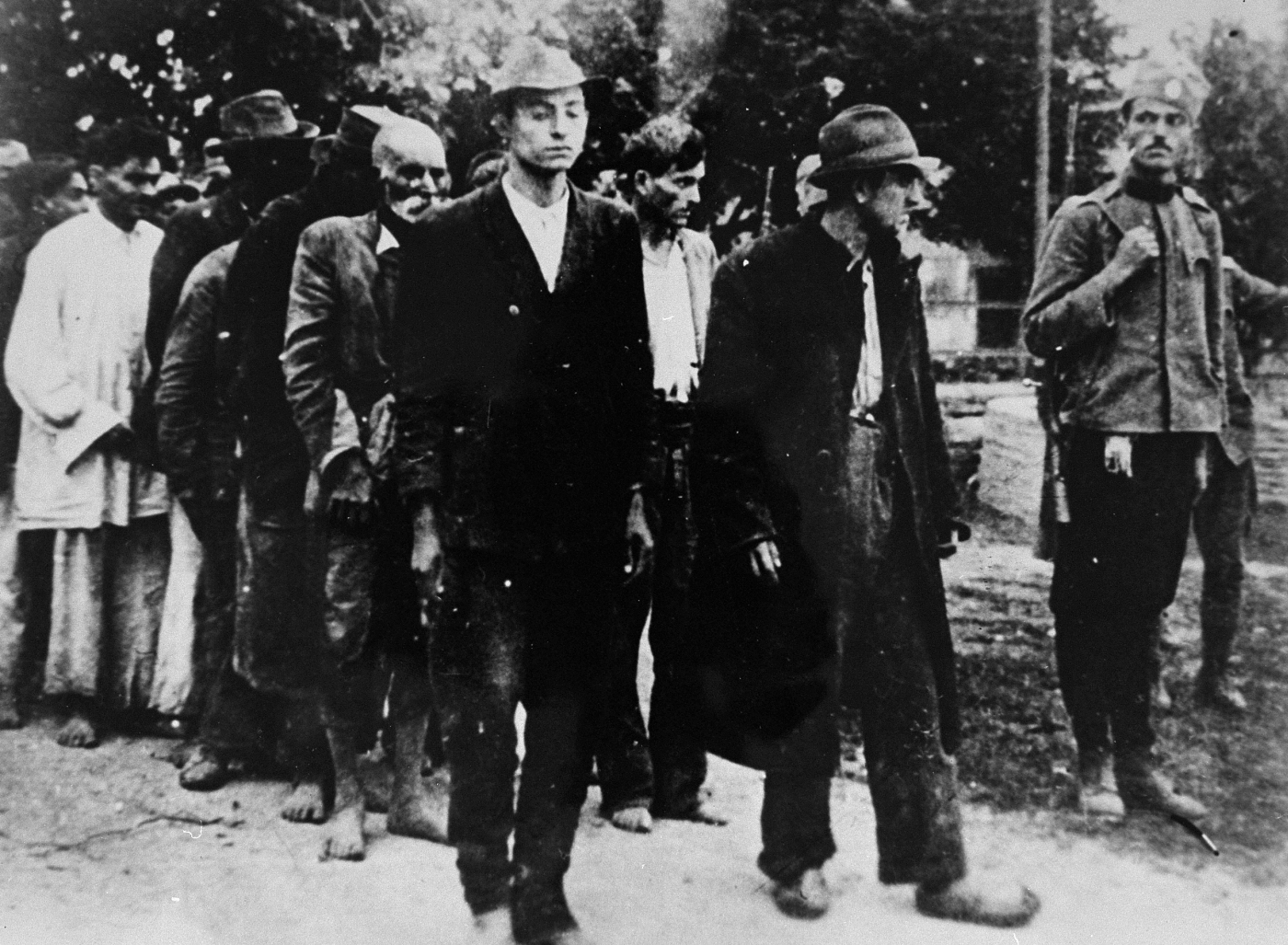
Roma escorted to execution in Serbia (1941)

In many areas to this day, the identification of someone as Roma can have negative consequences. Numerous attempts have been made to assimilate Romani people into European society by minimizing various cultural markers such as clothing. European states have had optional and forced attempts at assimilating or eradicating Romani culture. During the Porajmos and other events of extreme persecution where the identification of Roma could be dangerous, many Romani people had to abandon their cultural dress. However, Romani people continue to resist assimilation to this day despite current efforts by European states to demonize and outlaw Romani culture including Romani dress.

Due to movements such as Bohemianism, many non-Roma people have begun to dress up as Romani people. Helen Graham describes the problematic nature of this trend:

The problem with the Instagram tags is that non-Romani people can "dress-up Gypsy" for a day with no serious repercussions, but when a Romani person dresses in traditional clothing, or even a semblance of it, the response can be brutal.

== Gallery ==
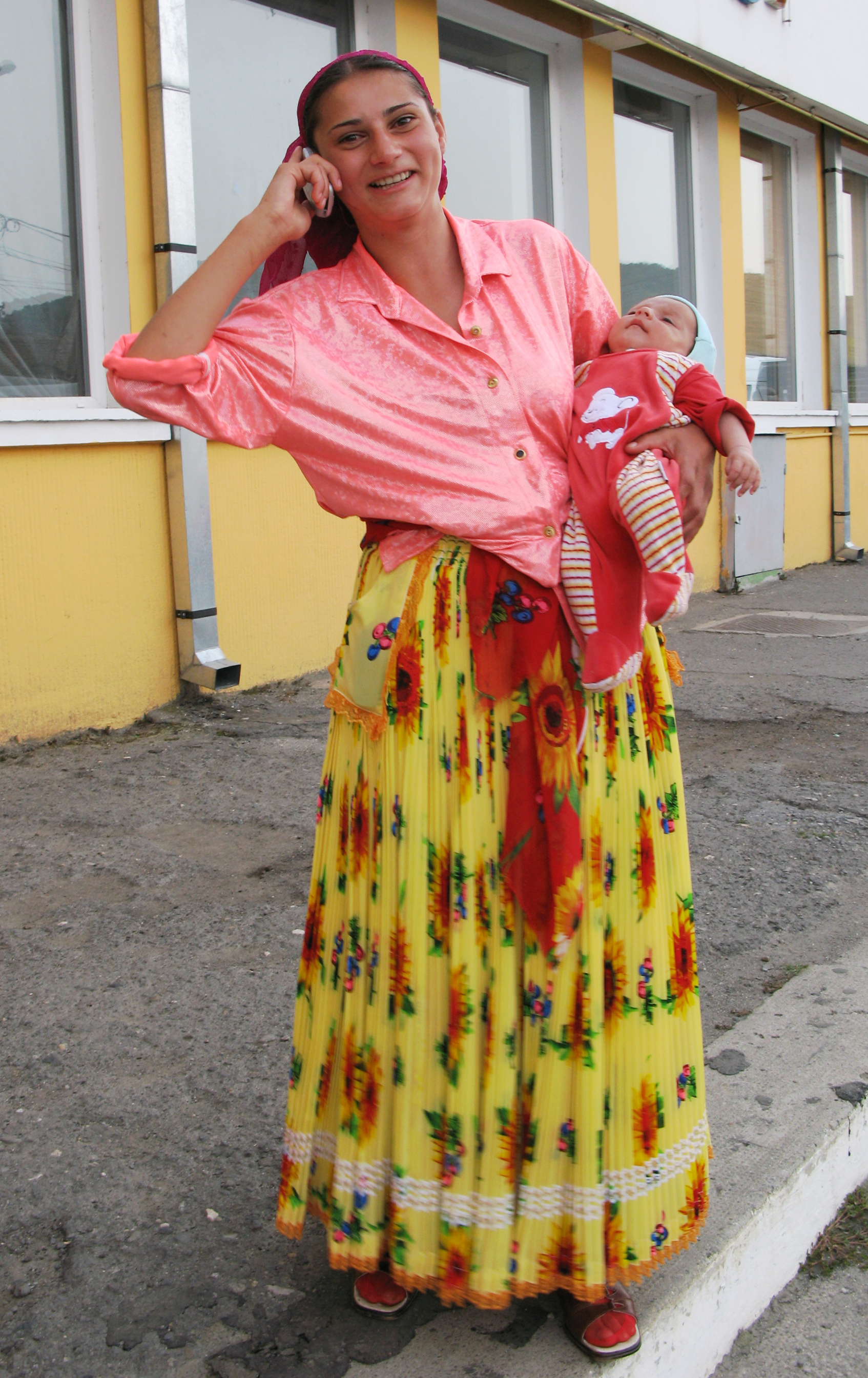
Romani mother in Romania

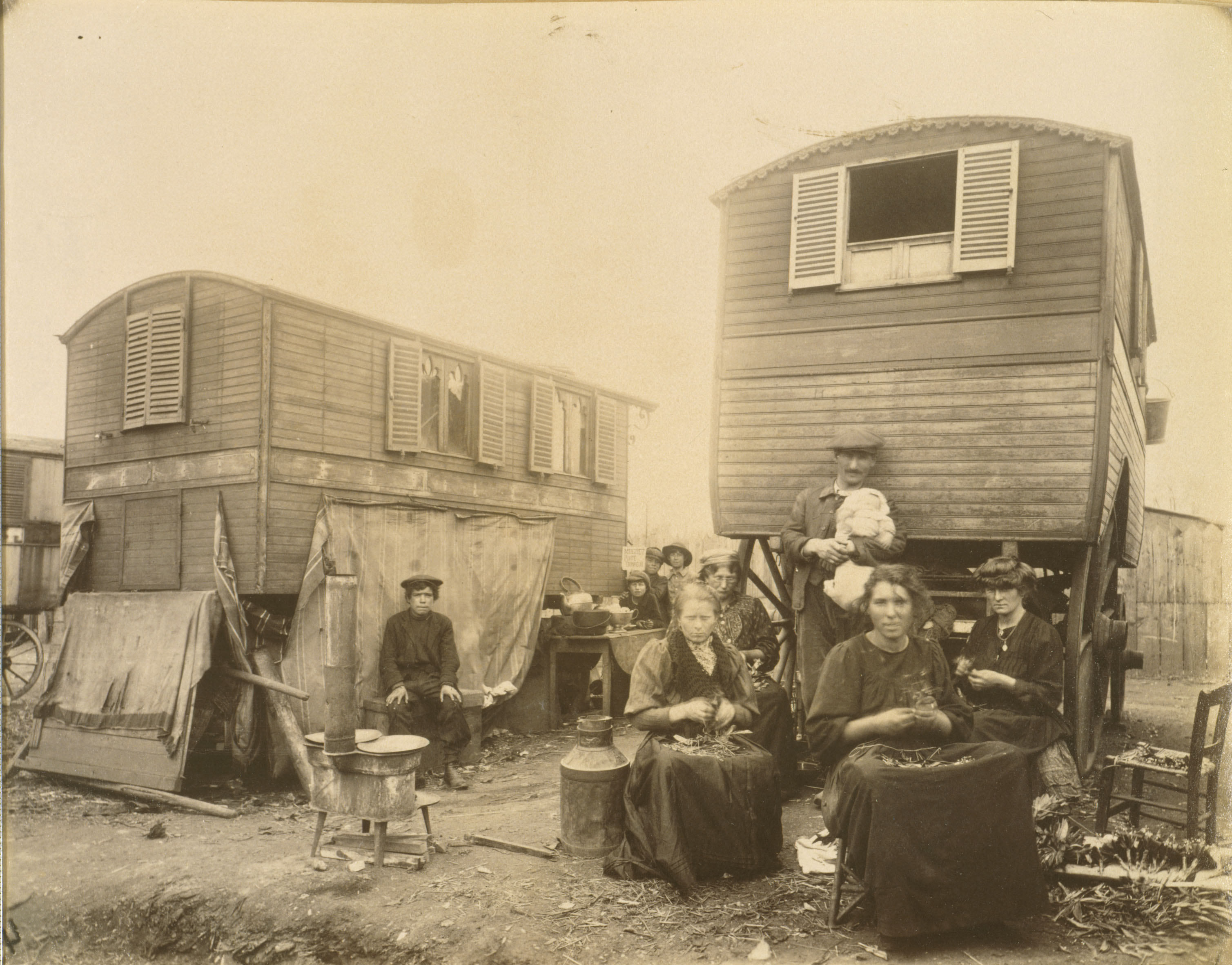
Romani people in France

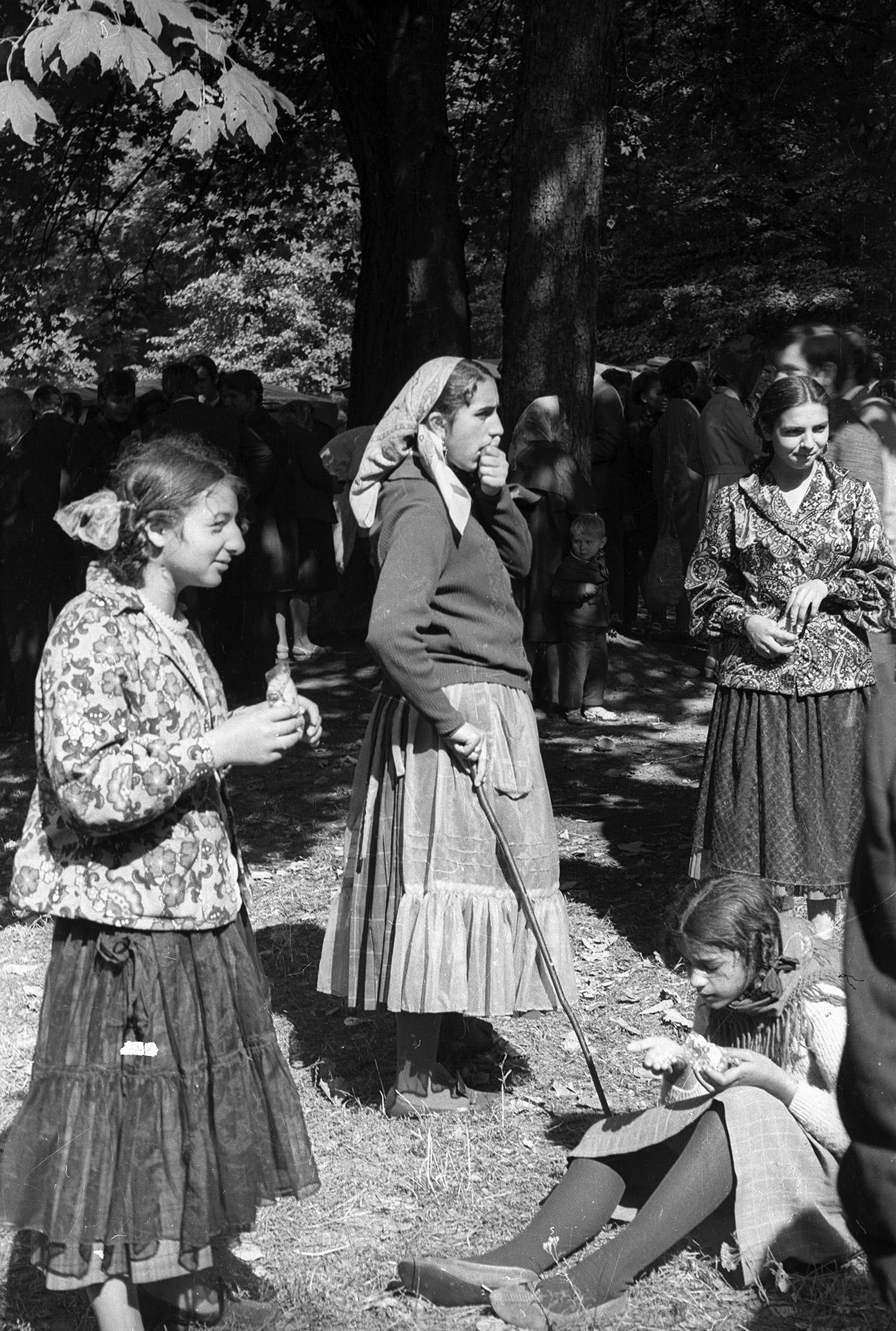
Polska Roma in Poland, in traditional dress

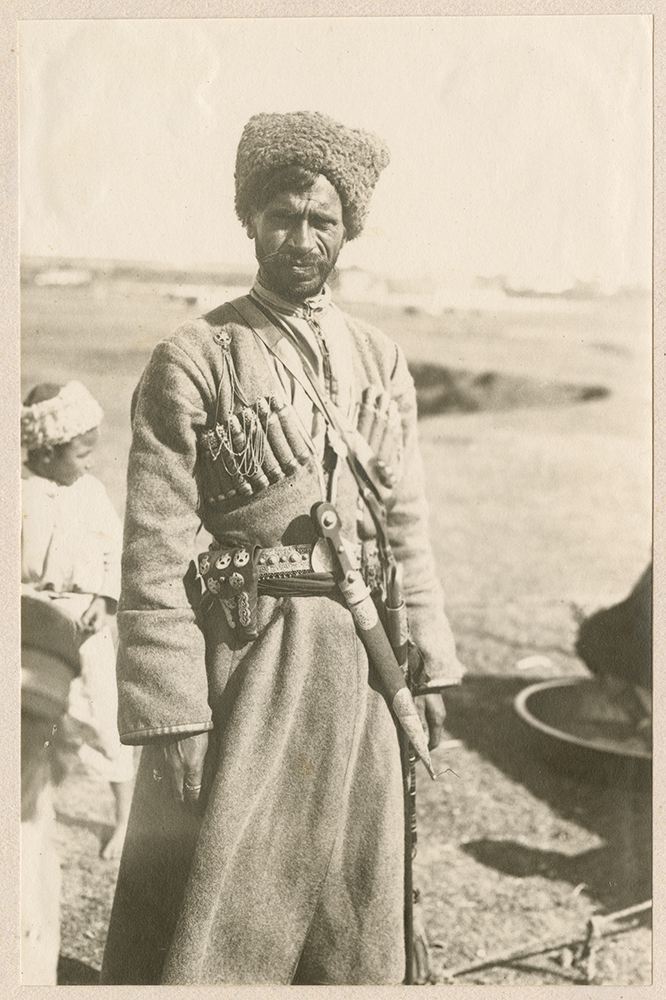
Romani man in the North Caucasus, Russia

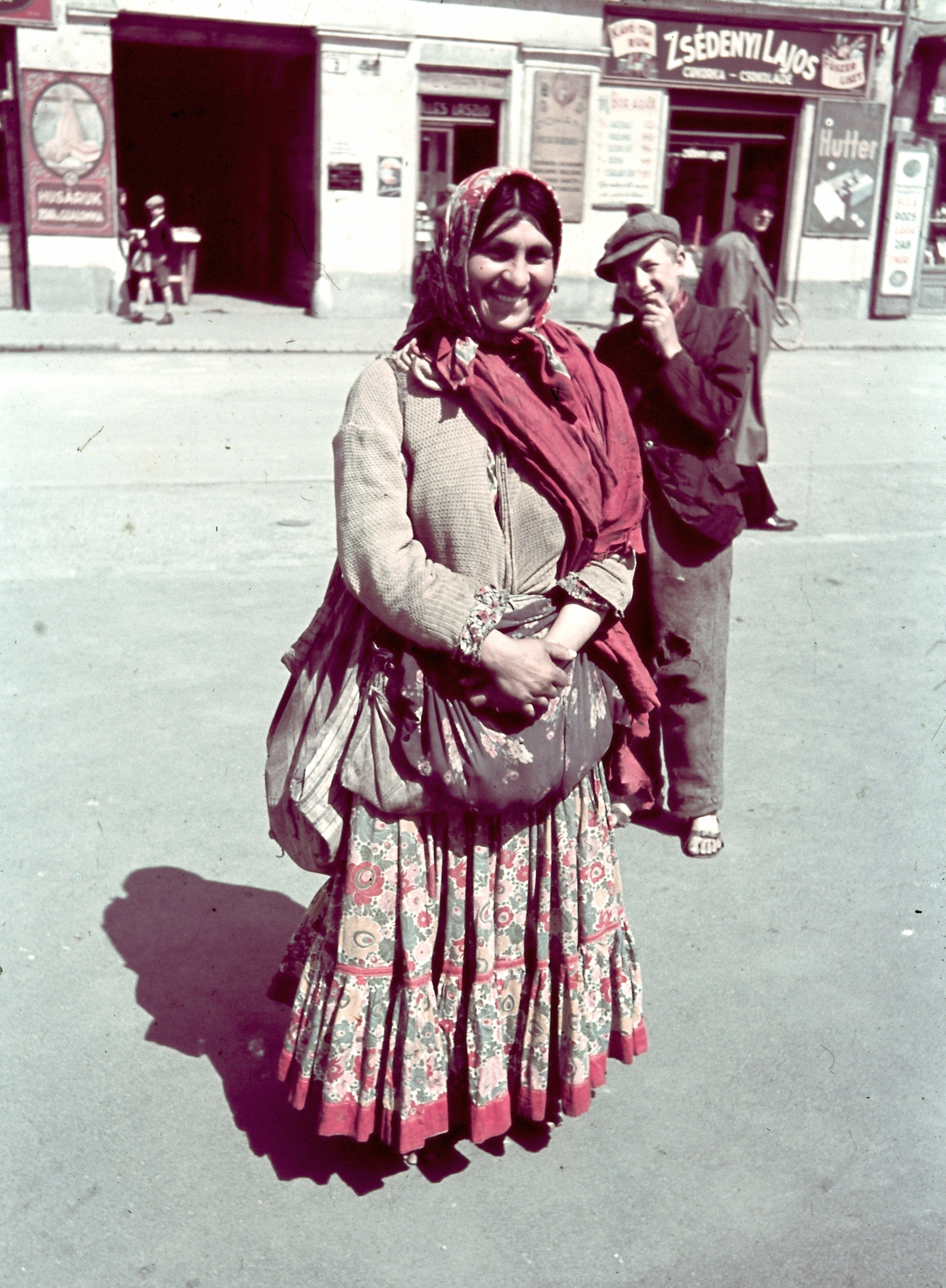
Romani woman in Hungary

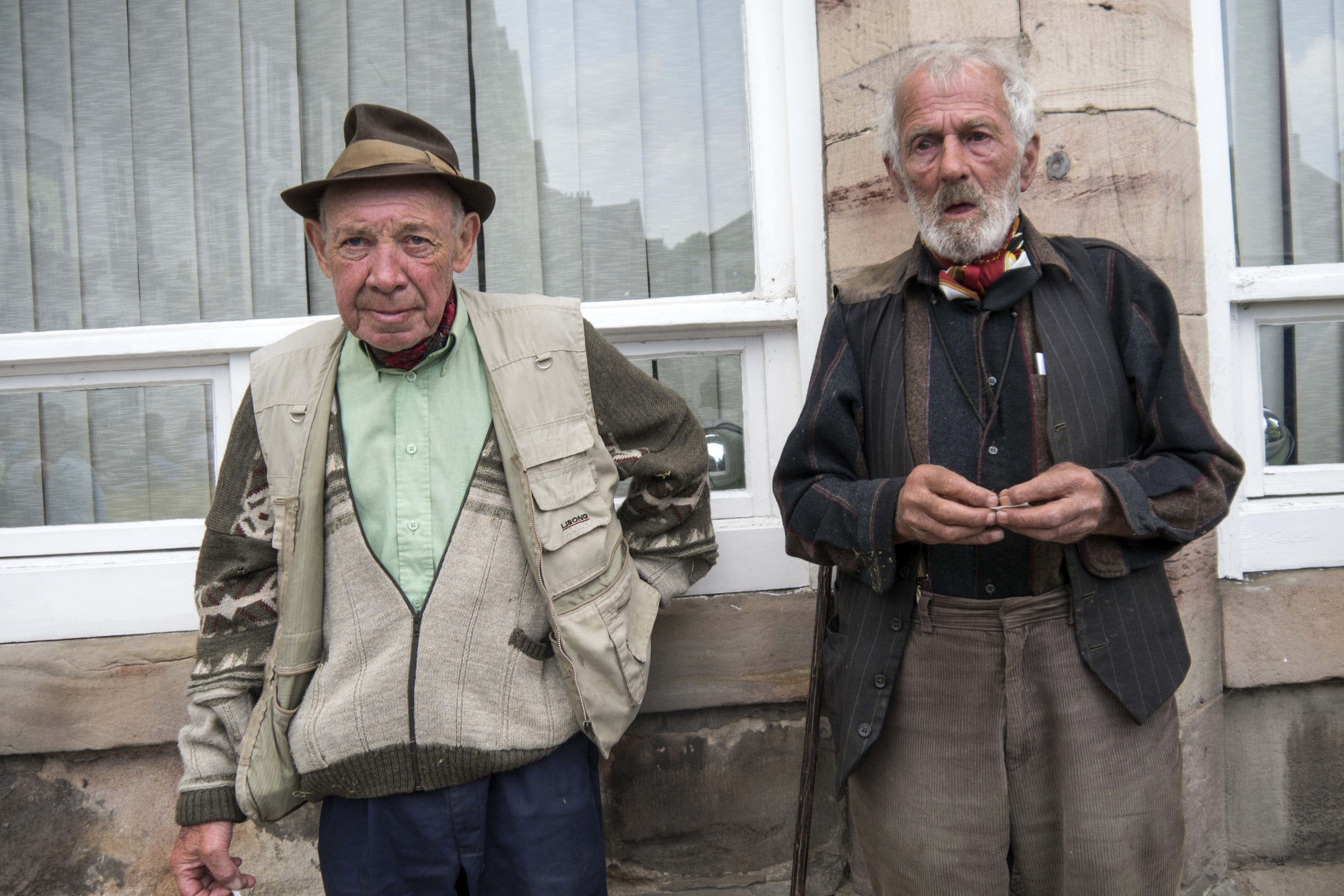
Romani men at the Appleby Horse Fair in England

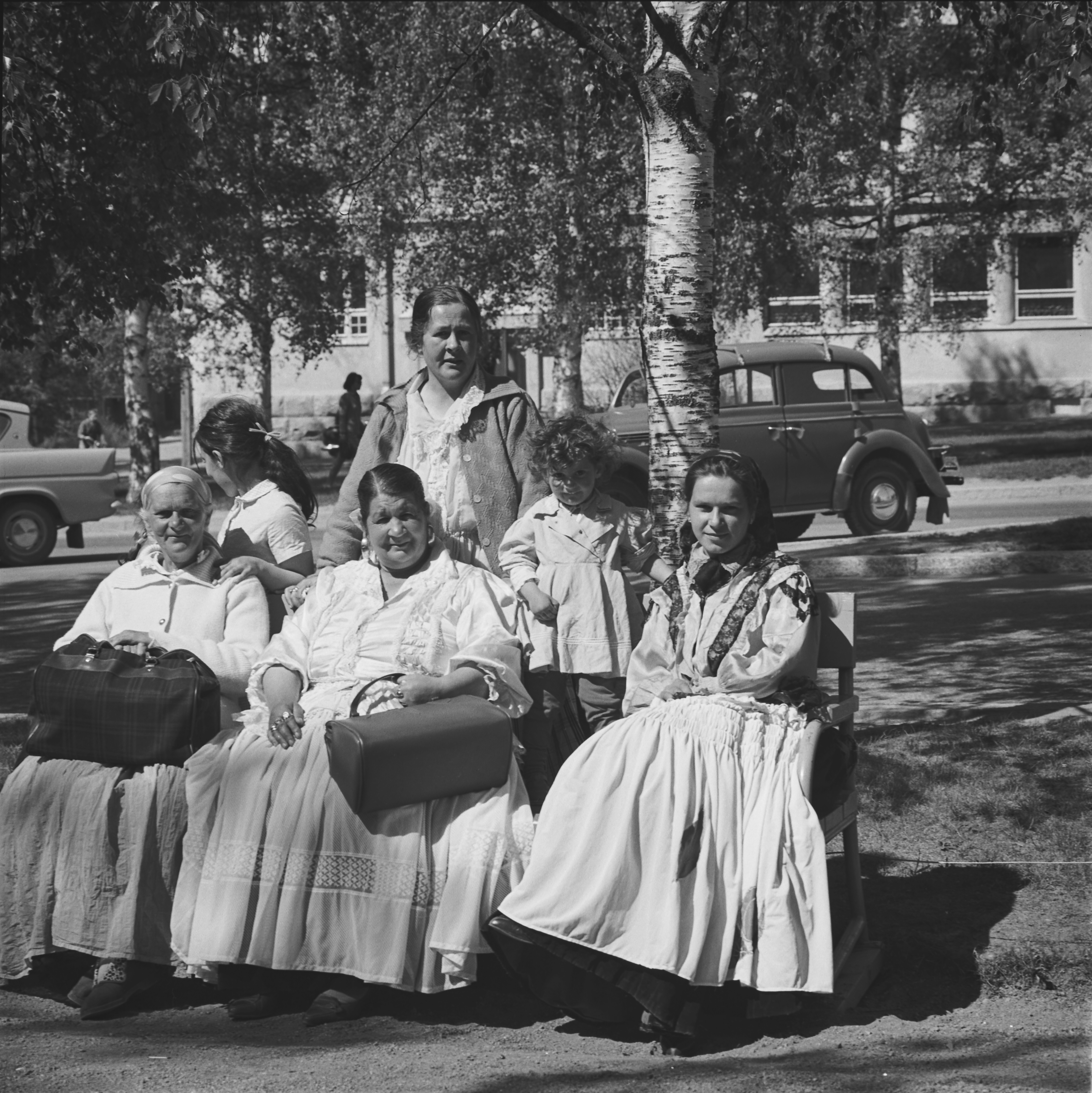
Romani women in Finland

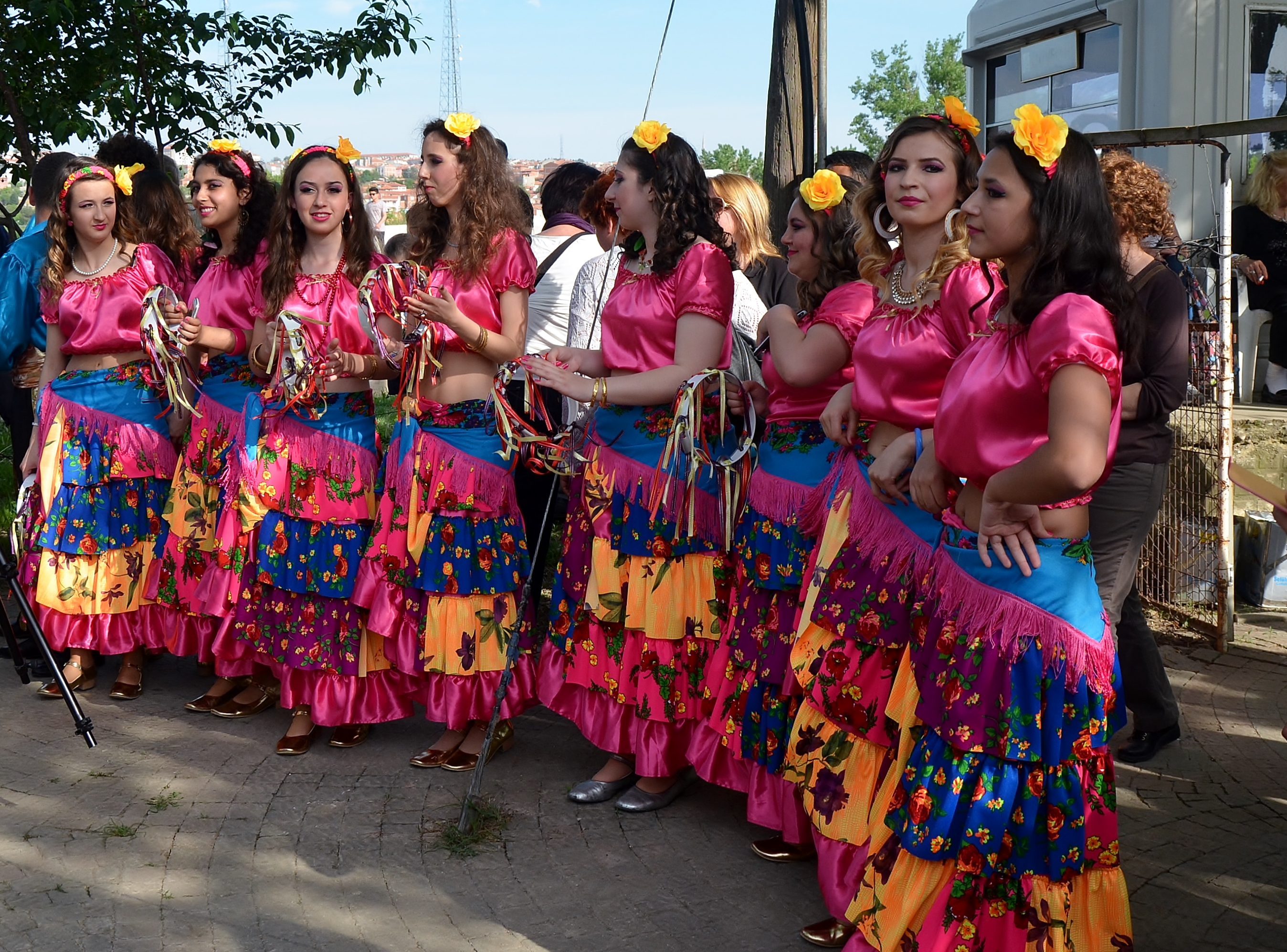
Romani women in Turkey

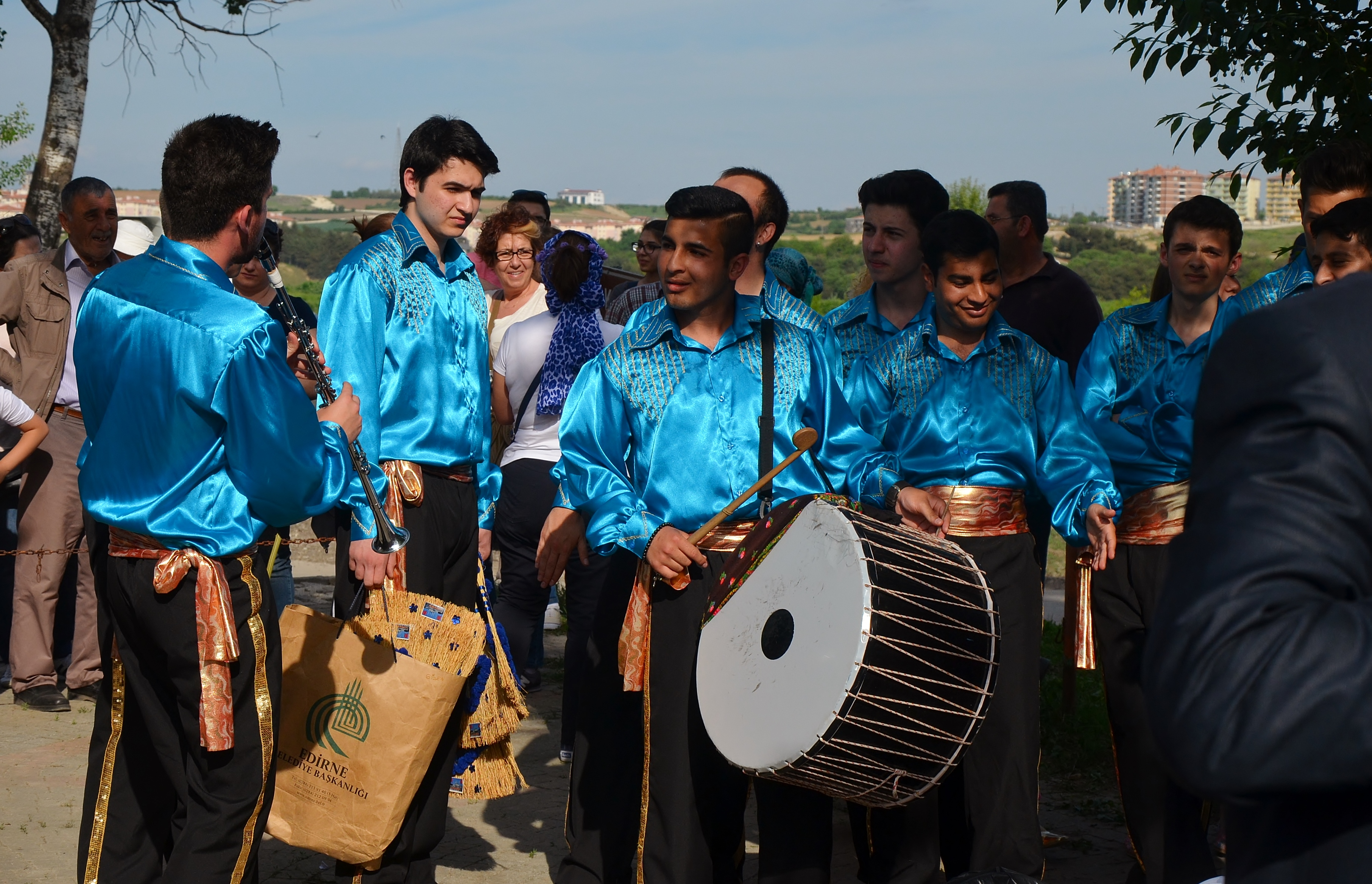
Romani men in Turkey

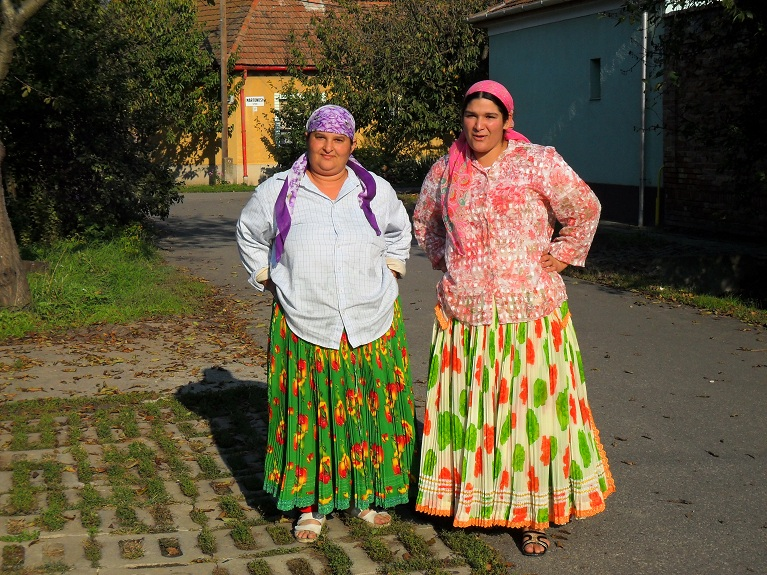
Gábor Romani women in Transylvania, Romania, in traditional dress

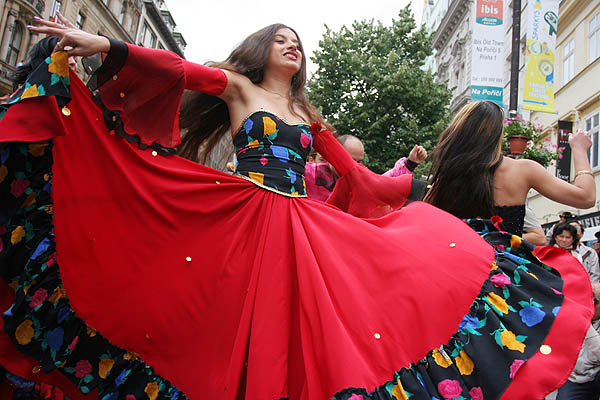
Dancers at the Khamoro Roma Festival in the Czech Republic

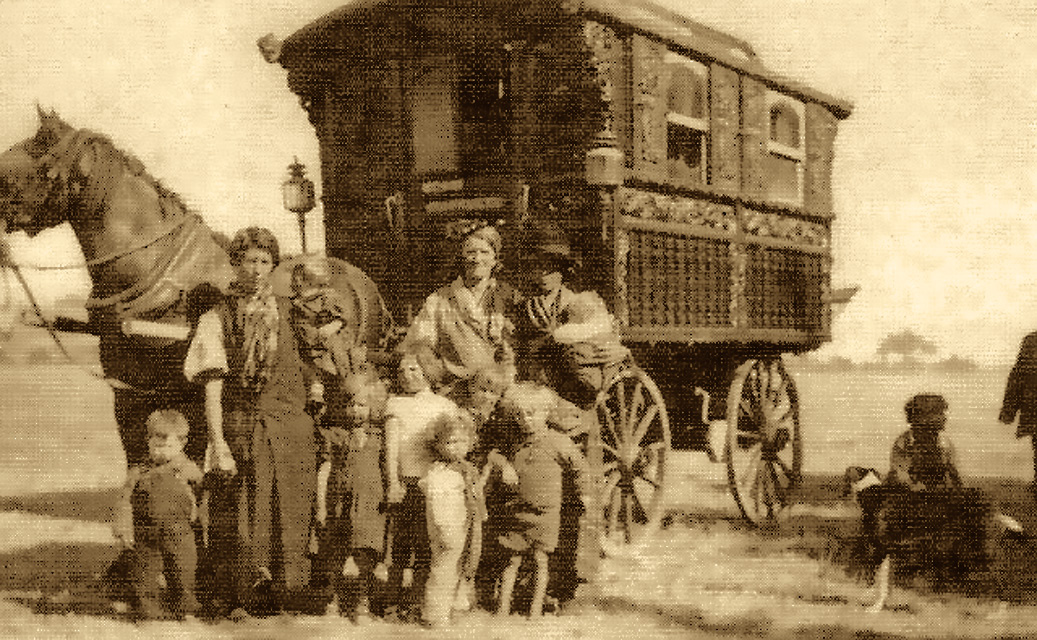
Romani family in England

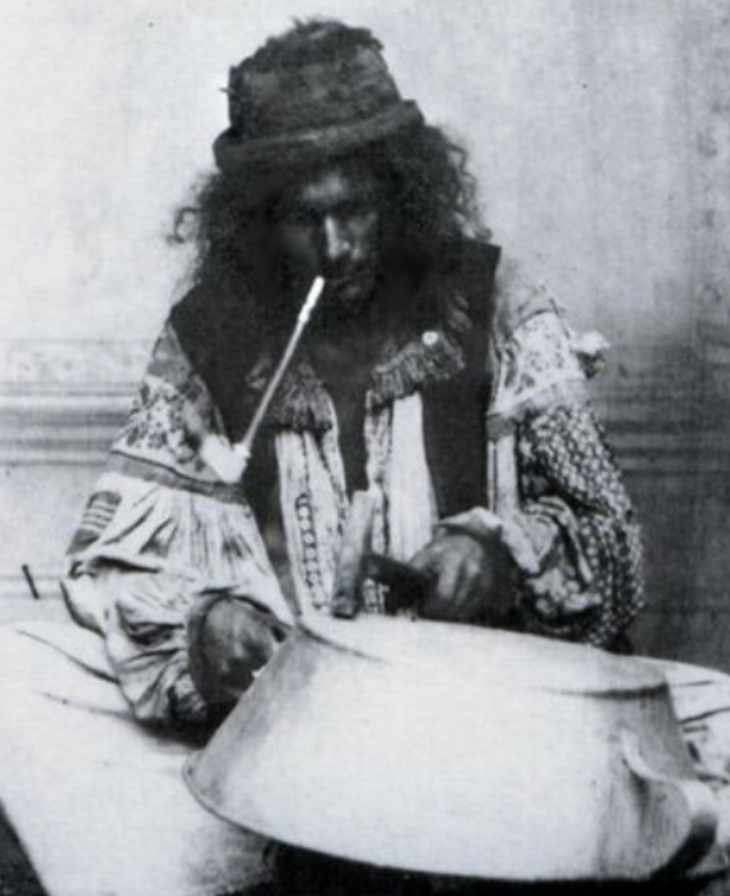
Kalderash Romani metalsmith in Hungary

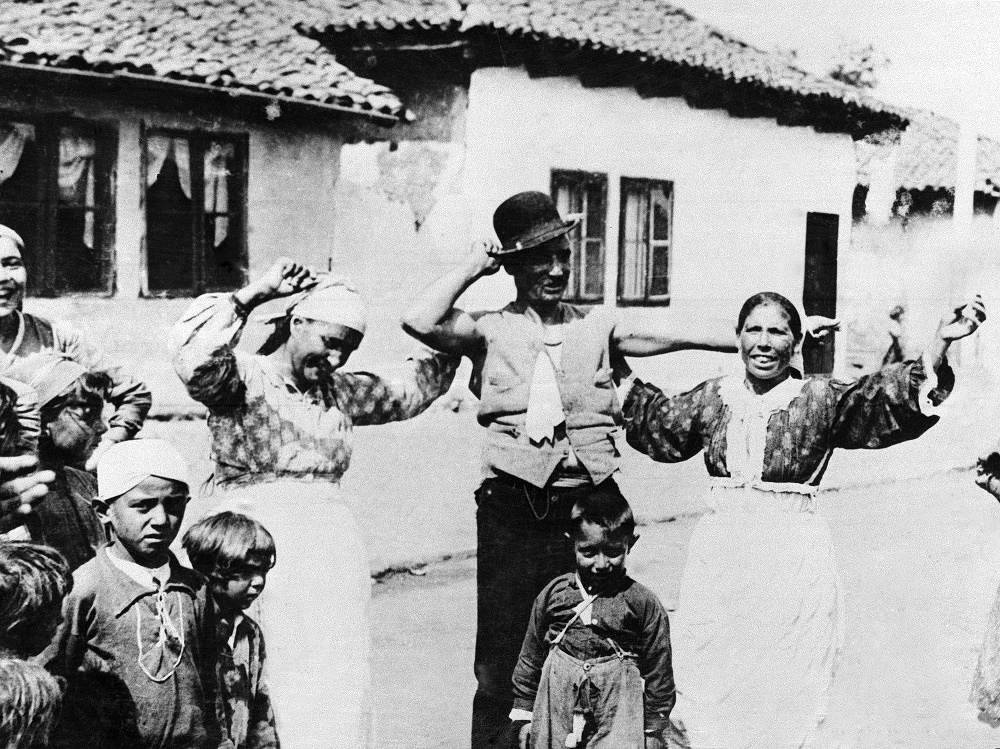
Romani people at a wedding in Bulgaria

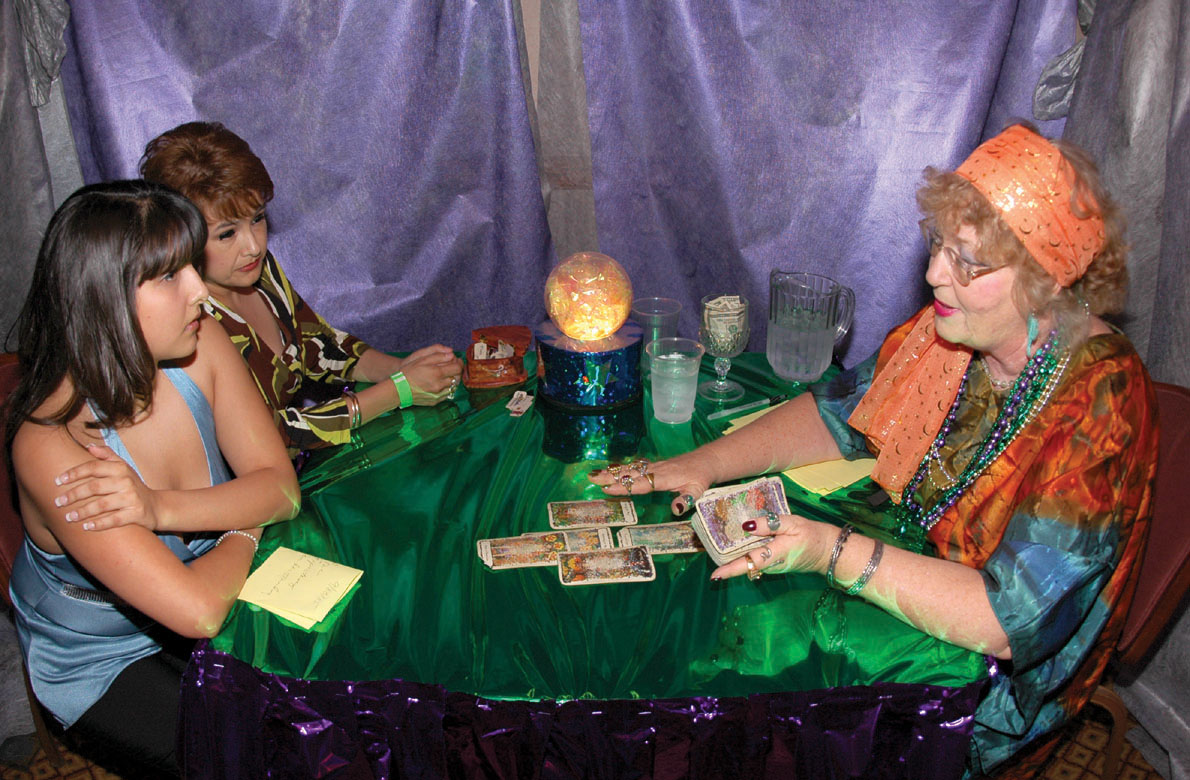
Romani fortune teller in the United States

=== In art ===
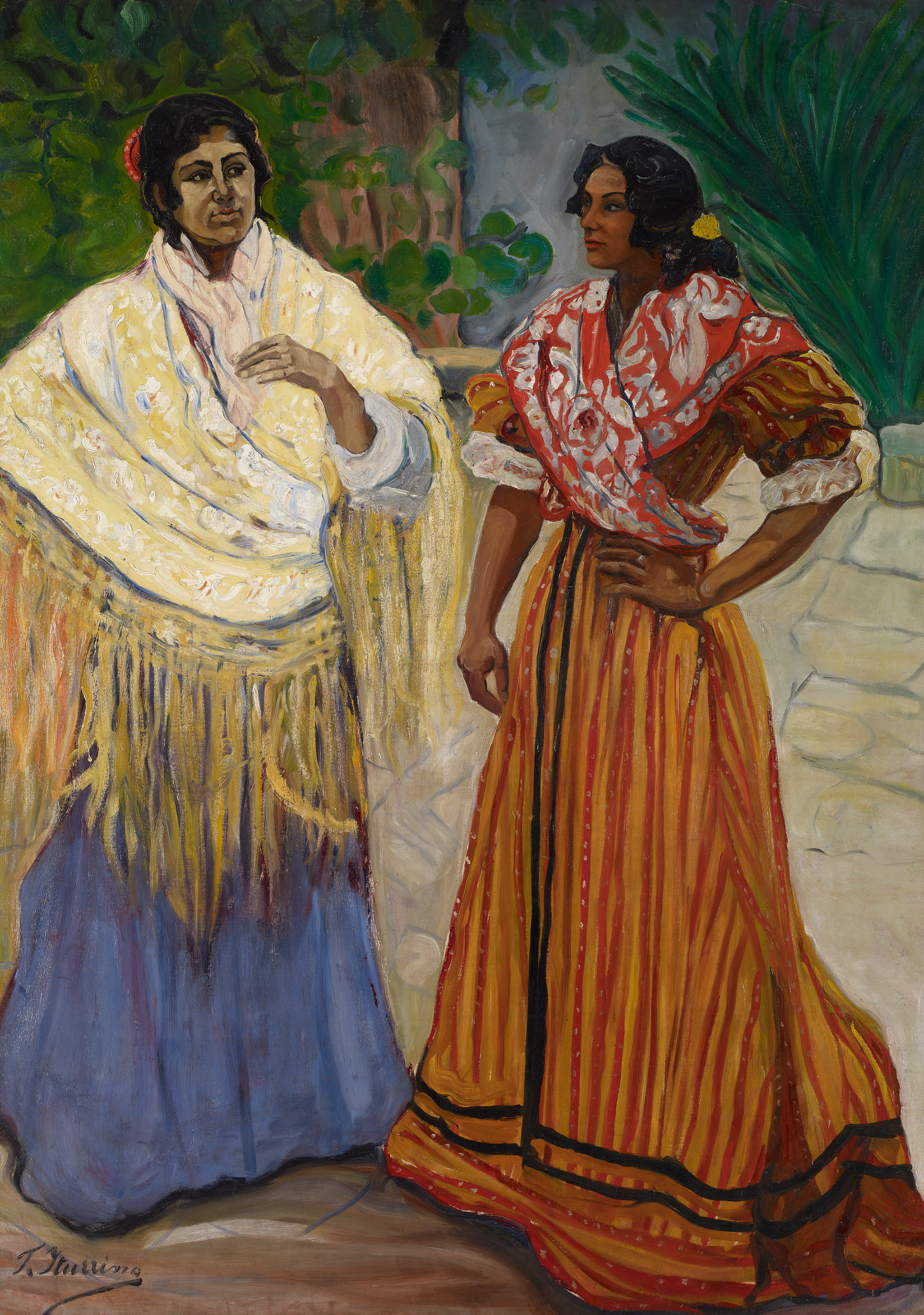
Two Gypsies by Francisco Iturrino (c. 1901-1903)

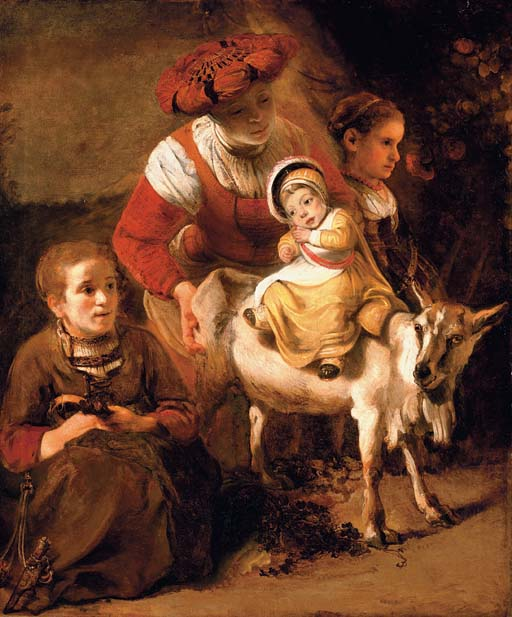
The Spanish Gypsy by Nicolaes Maes (c.1653)

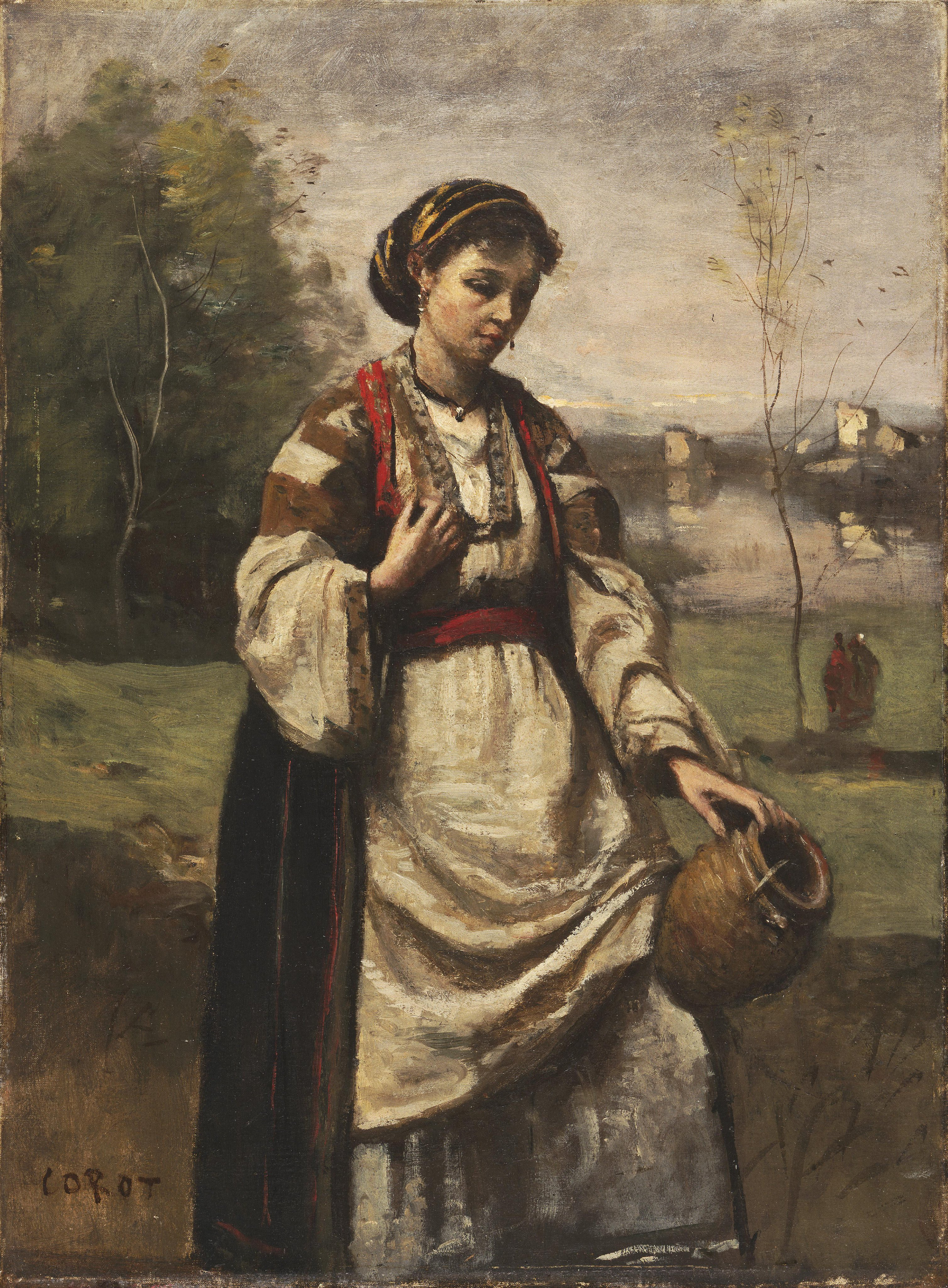
Gypsy Girl at a Fountain by Jean-Baptiste-Camille Corot (1865-1870)

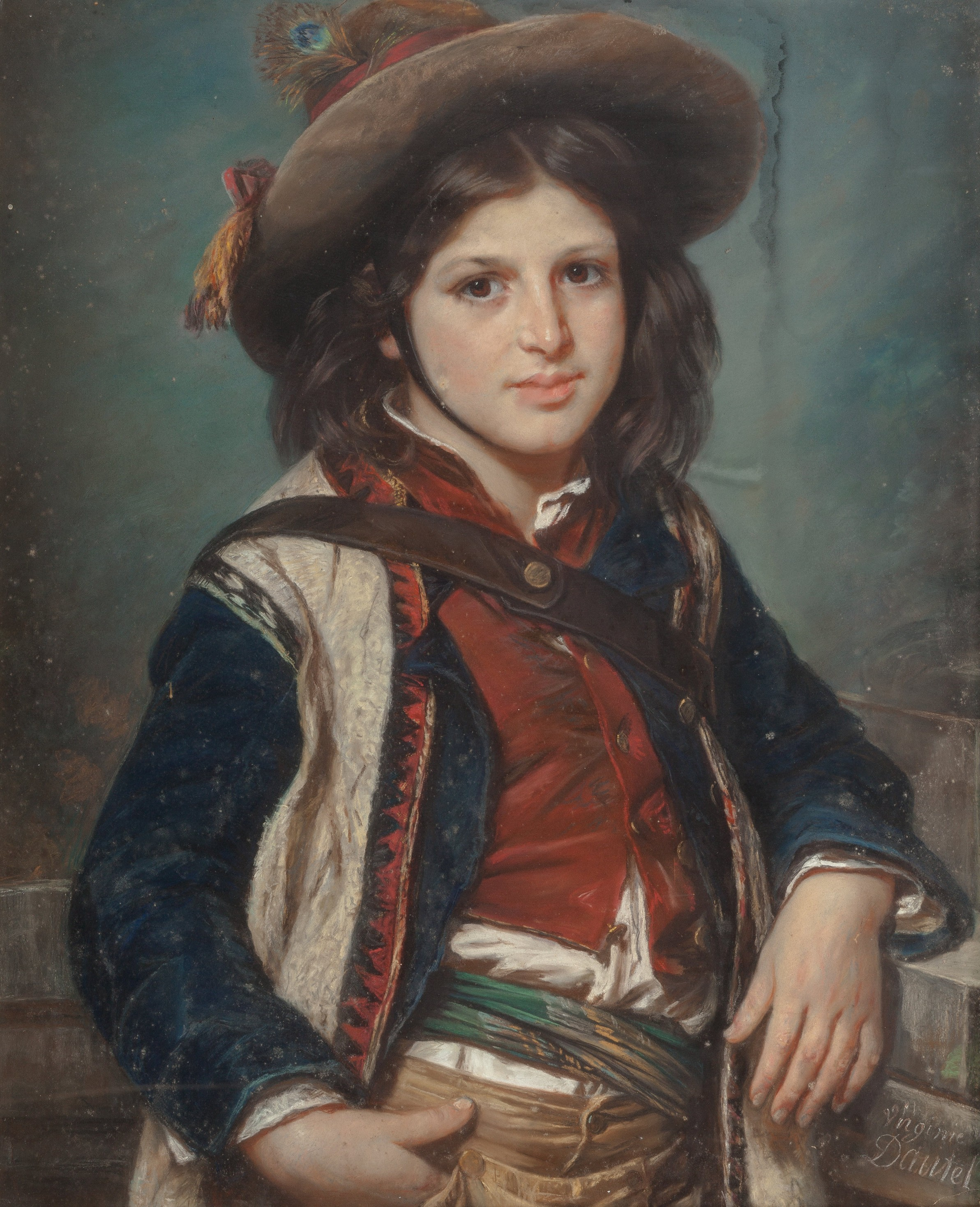
Gypsy Boy by Henriette-Virginie Dautel

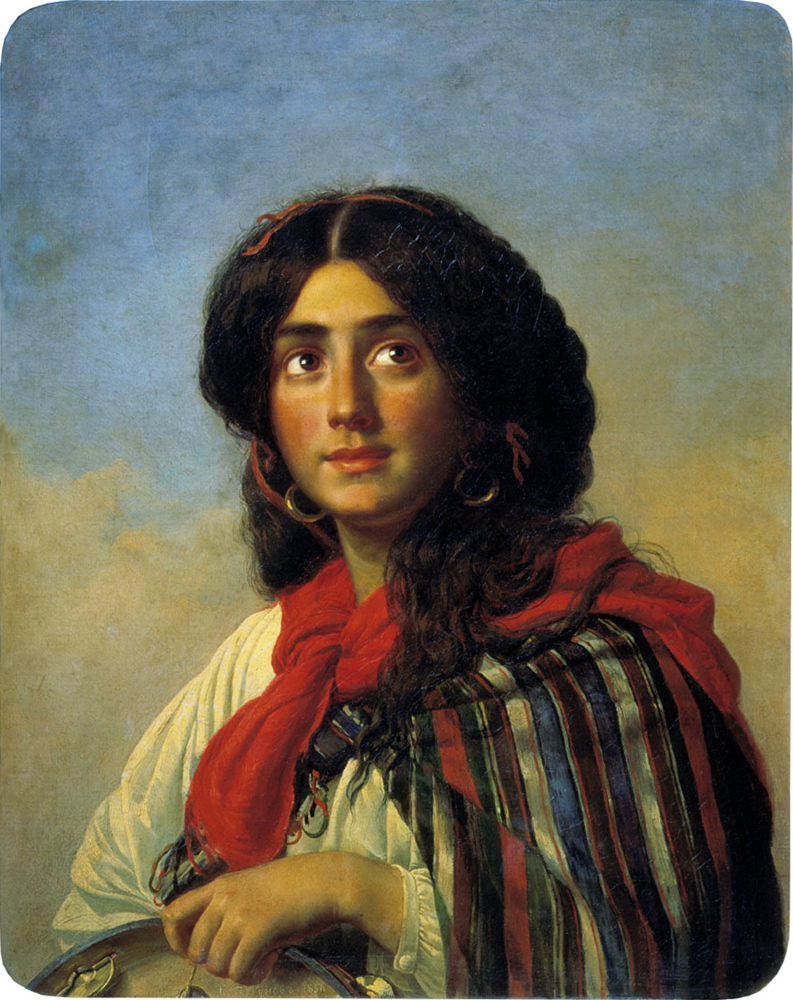
Gypsy Woman by Kirill Gorbunov (1851)

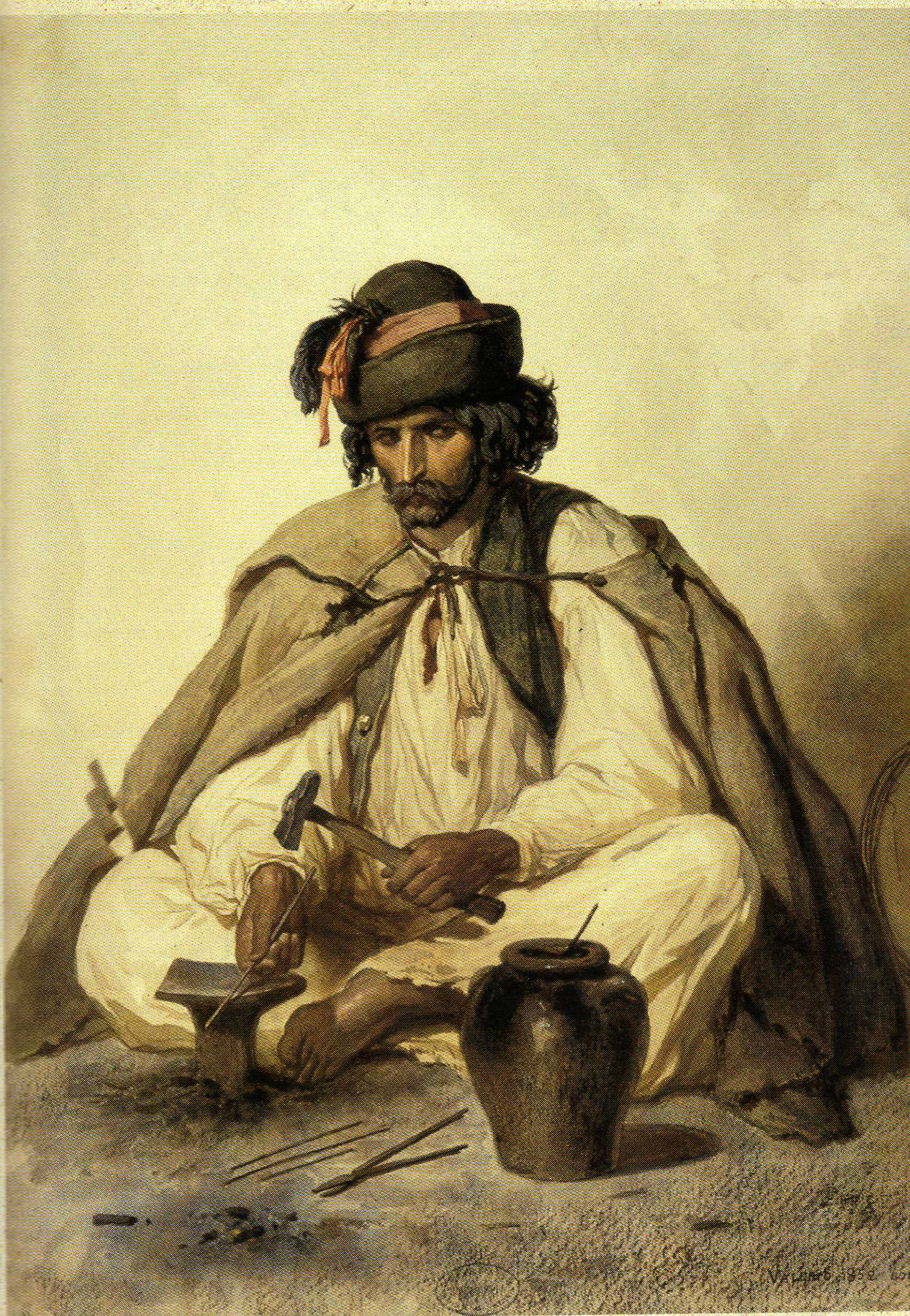
Romani blacksmith in the Matra mountains by Théodore Valério (1852)

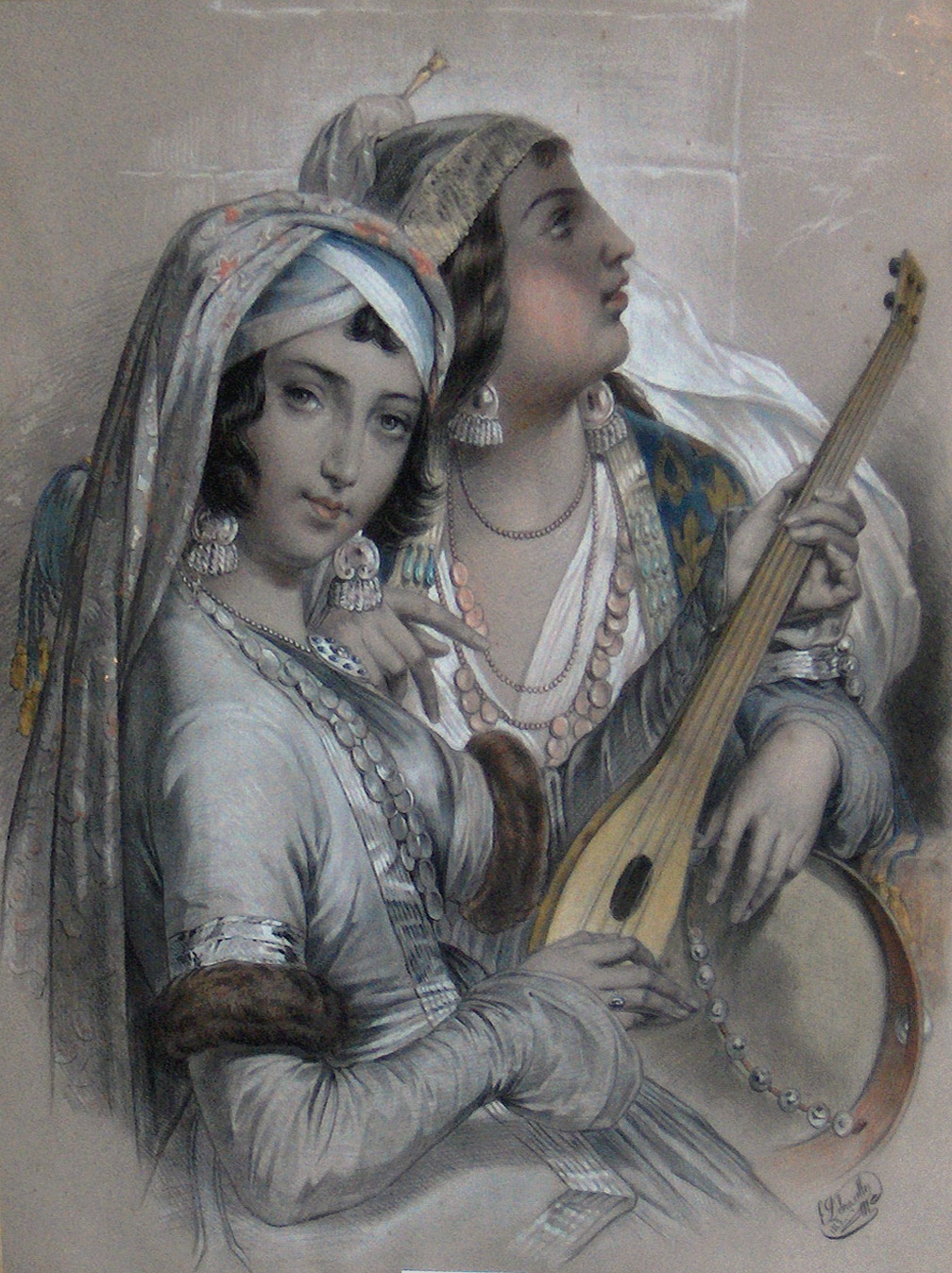
Musical Romani Girls, oriental drawing by Edouard Debruxelles, (1835-1871)

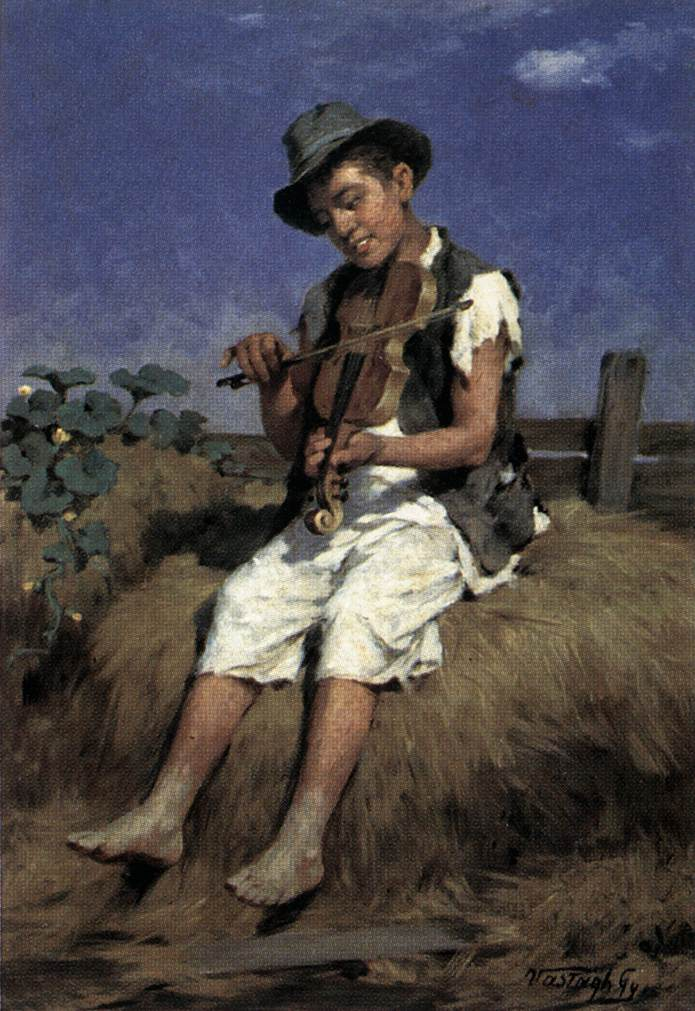
Fiddler Gypsy Boy by György Vastagh

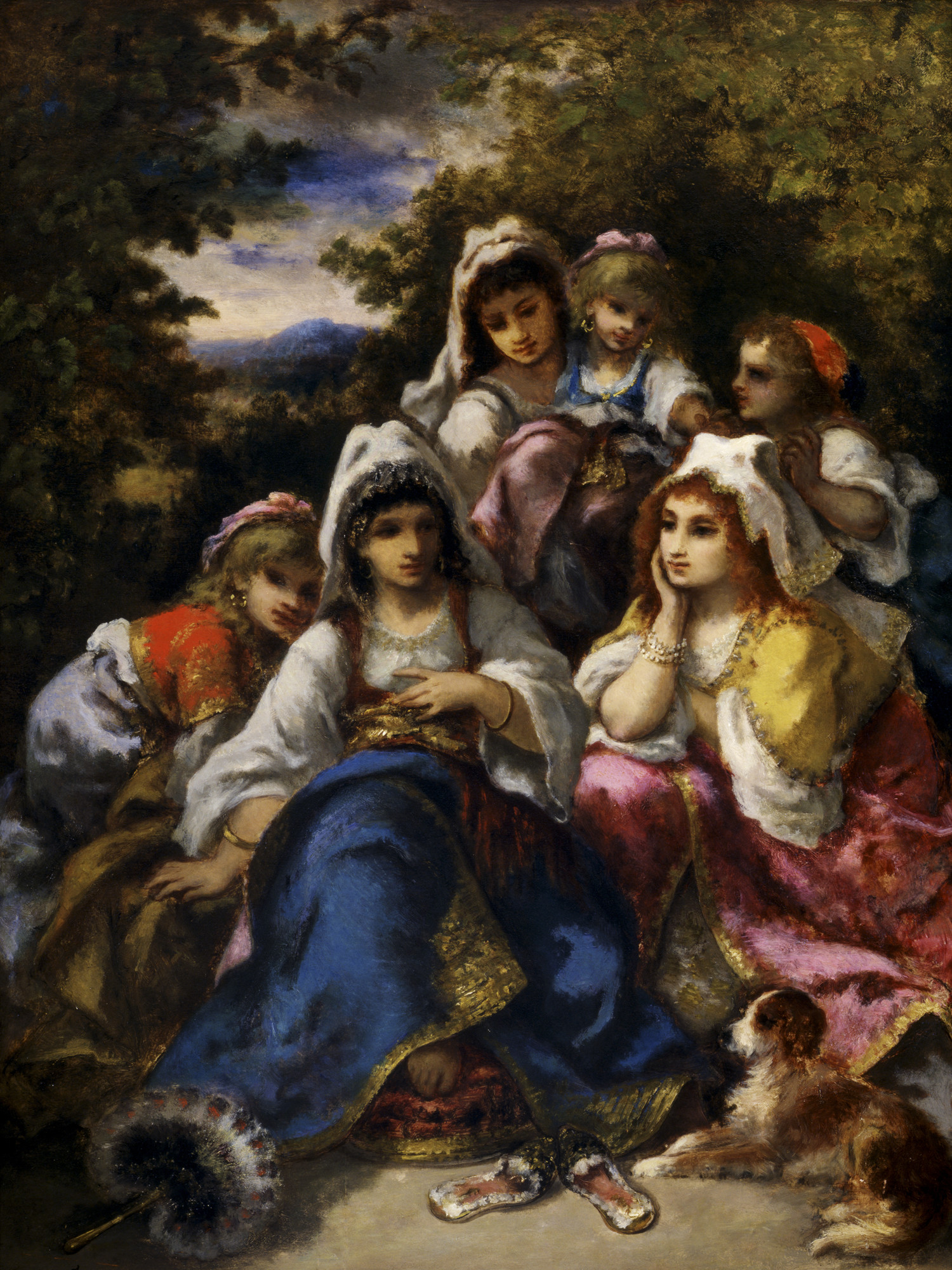
The Gypsy Princesses by Narcisse Virgilio Diaz de la Peña (c.1865-1870)

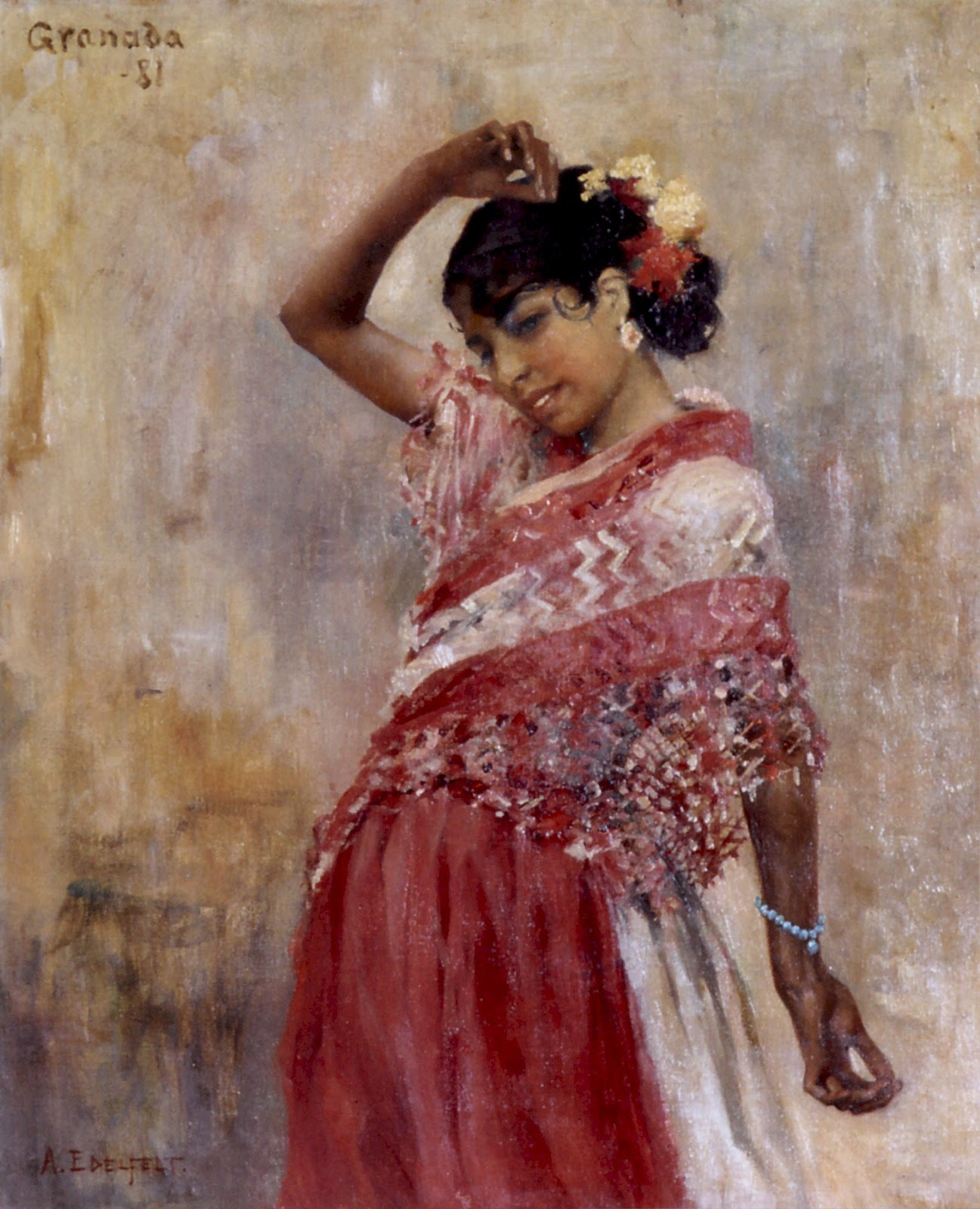
Gitana Dancing by Albert Edelfelt (1881)

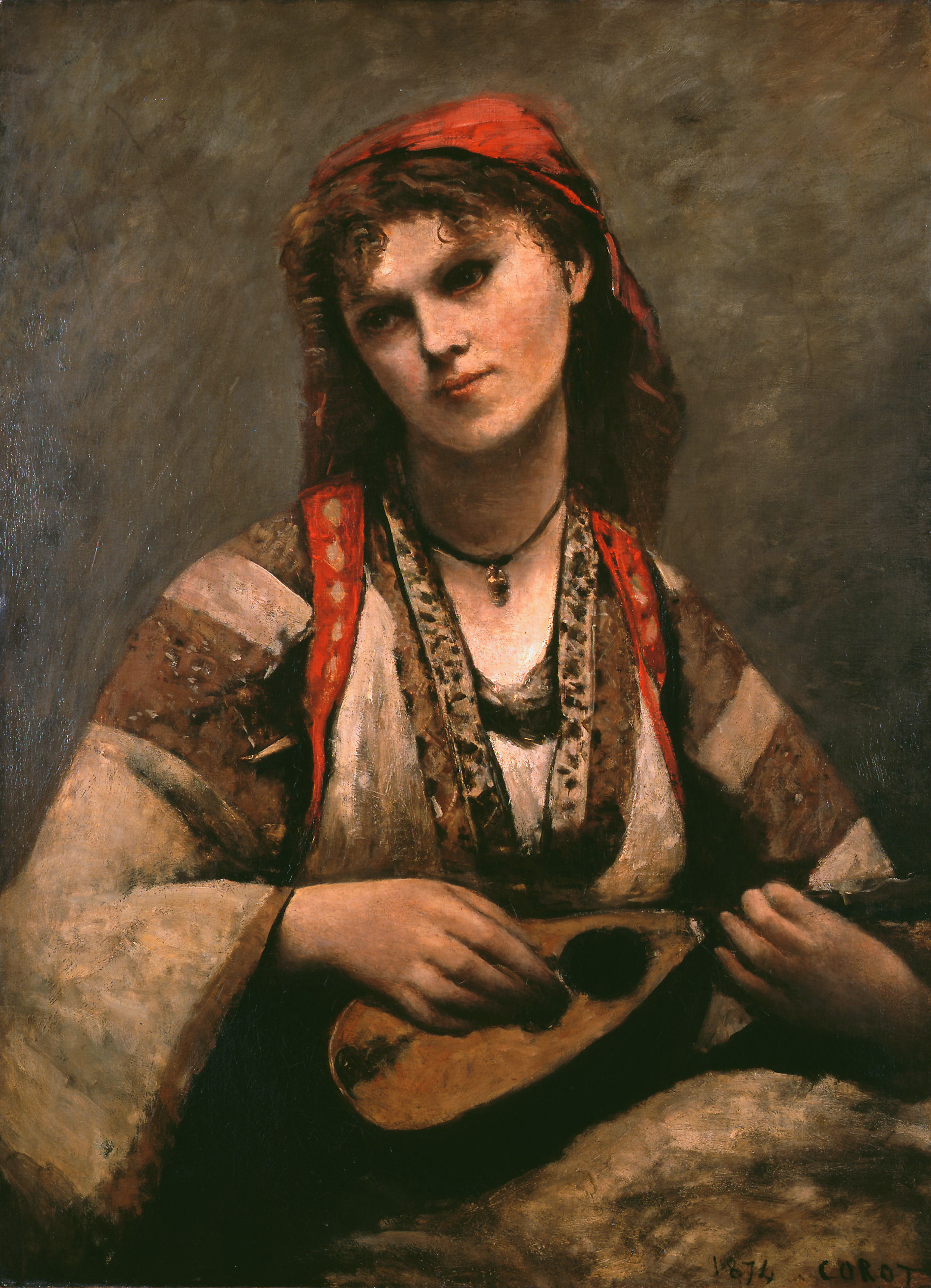
Gypsy Girl with Mandolin by Jean-Baptiste-Camille Corot (1874)

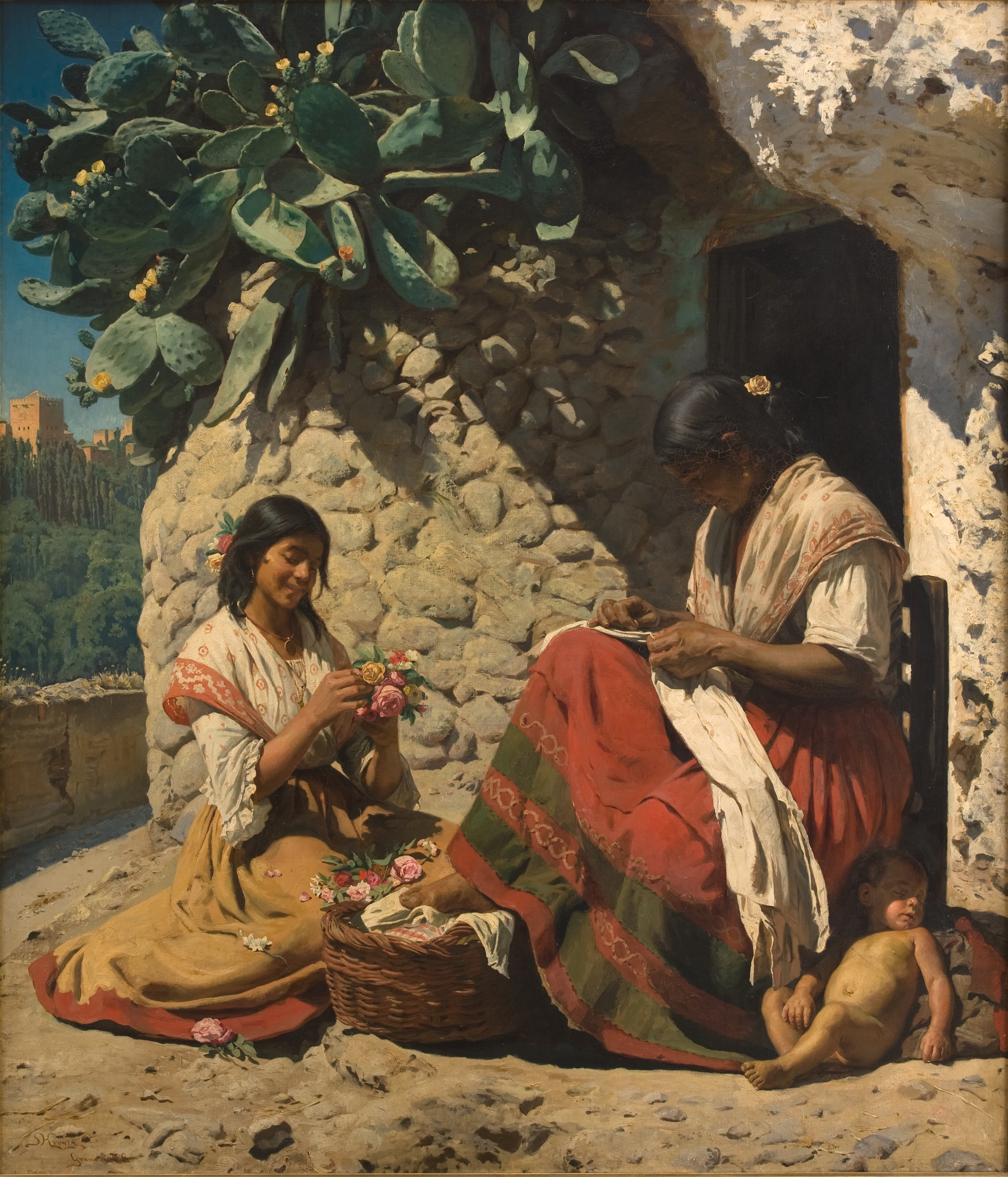
Two Gypsy Women Outside their Cottage by Peder Severin Krøyer (1878)

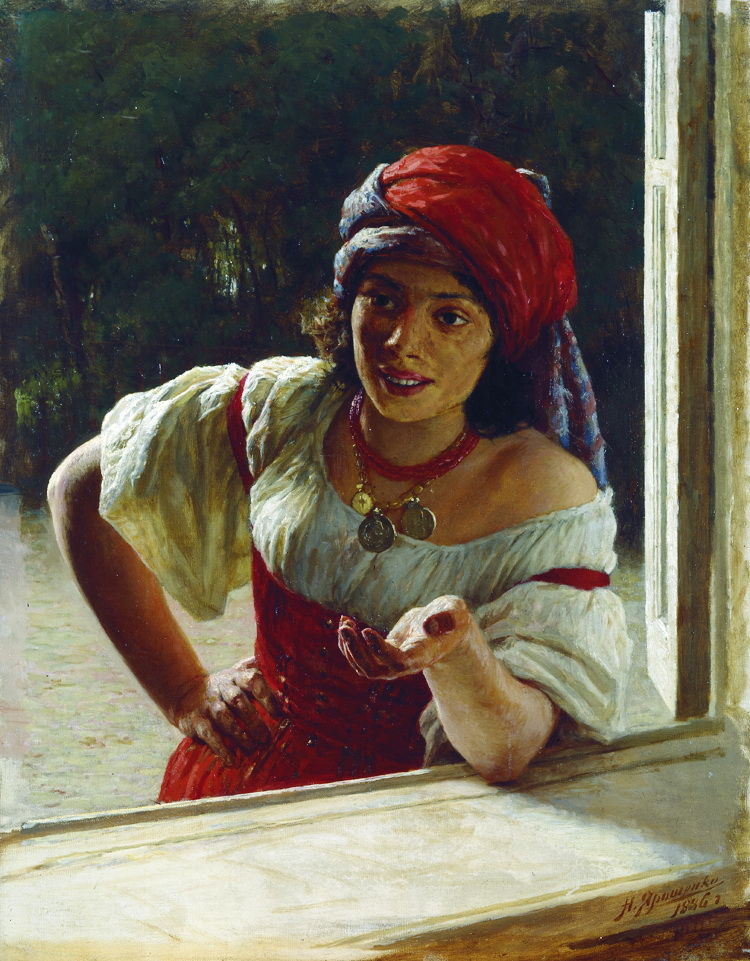
Gypsy Woman by Nikolai Yaroshenko (1886)

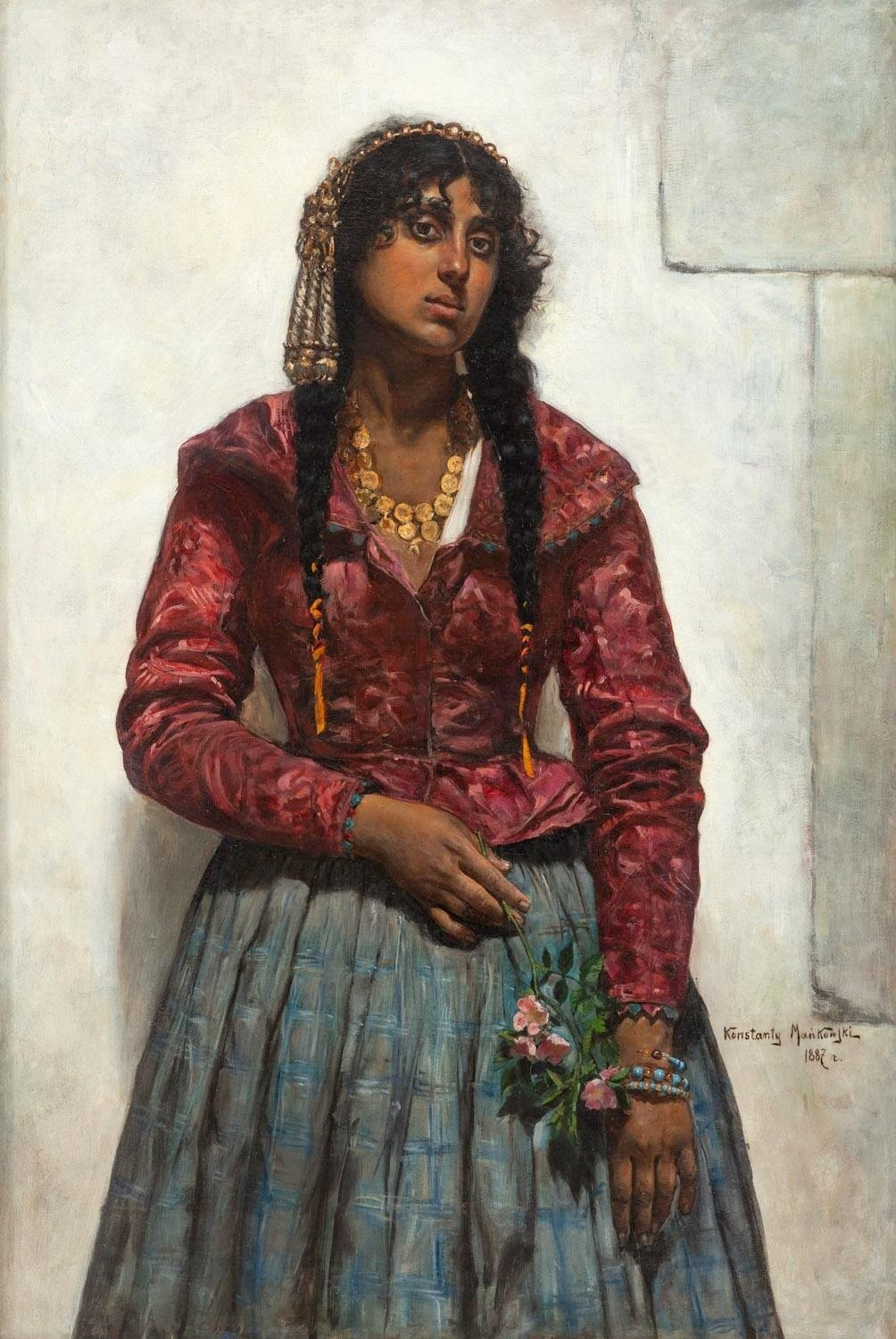
Gypsy Woman by Konstanty Mańkowski (1887)

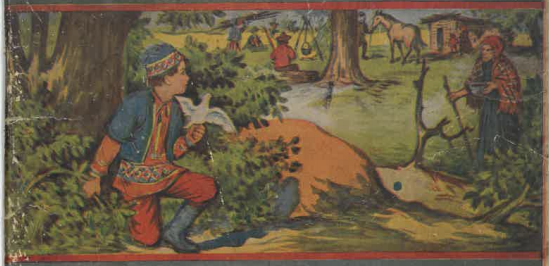
Image on the cover page of The Gypsy Lad in Roumania, a book by Zelia Margaret Walters (1914)

== See also ==
- Romani society and culture
