= World Roma Festival =

Annual Romani festival in Prague

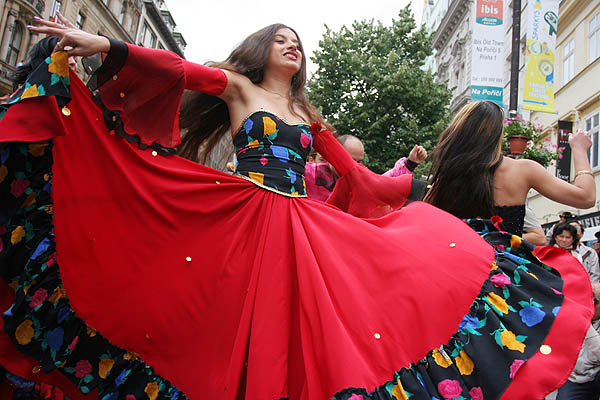
Street performance during the 2007 Khamoro in Prague.

The World Roma Festival (Czech: Mezinárodní romský festival) or Khamoro is an international Romani festival held annually in the city of Prague, Czech Republic. It belongs to the most prestigious Roma projects on an international level with top international Roma musicians performing. The five-day-long festival is held in May on the streets of Prague and in a number of the city's clubs. The festival is divided into three sections: the Expert Section, which includes seminars, Culture Section, which consists of music, dancing, and parades, and Media Section, which provides the information leading up to the festival.

== See also ==
- Designblok
