= Crimean Tatar subethnic groups =

The subethnic groups of the Crimean Tatar people refer to ethnic subdivisions among Crimean Tatars deriving from their diverse pre-Tatarization origins, language dialect, and customs. The three main sub-ethnic groups are the Steppe, Mountain, and Coastal. Some anthropologists consider the Crimean Tatars of Romani descent to be a fourth subethnic group, within the predominant Tatar group of whichever part of Crimea they inhabit

Some historians with more broad definition of the term Crimean Tatar consider other groups such as the Crimean Urums, Lipka Tatars, and Dobrujan Tatars to also be subethnic groups of the Crimean Tatars, but these views are not widespread, since the Urums never adopted Islam, which is a core part of the Crimean Tatar identity, while the Lipka Tatars and Dobruja Tatars split off from the Crimean Tatars centuries ago and have grown more distant in culture and language over time.

Historically the differences between the different subethnic groups were much more distinct, but over time in exile the groups became much less differentiated, especially due to Soviet policy of denying that Crimean Tatars existed led to gradual decline in distinctions between the groups due to assimilation, a trend that continued even after their return to Crimea. Nevertheless, Crimean Tatars retain awareness of their families subethnic origins and customs. Geographic-based identities tied to where in Central Asia a Crimean Tatar family was exiled to have also developed.

While the Steppe subethnos was politically dominant in the era of the Crimean Khanate, the Southcoast and Mountain Crimean Tatar language dialects grew to be predominant in Crimean Tatar literature, with the Southcoast dialect being dominant in literature until Crimean Tatars switched to using the Central Mountain dialect for literature in 1927.

== Background ==
Crimean Tatars are a heterogenous ethnic group derived from the gradual merger of the different ethnic groups of Crimea. Contrary to the popular misconception and Soviet propaganda, they are not a diaspora of the Volga Tatars of Tatarstan, and the origins of the two groups are very different. The subethnic divisions of the Crimean Tatar people are tied to the three main environments of Crimea - the Steppe, the Mountains, and the Coastline.

Over the centuries, many different ethnic groups living in Crimea — including but not limited to Armenians, Circassians, Georgians, Goths, Greeks, and Italians underwent the process of Tatarization, adopting Crimean Tatar customs and language. Over time, the cultural and linguistic differences between different Tatarized peoples decreased, and gradually evolved into being the Tat subgroups of the Crimean Tatar people. Contrary to how Soviet propaganda depicted Crimean Tatars, the Crimean Tatars have only very minuscule traces of Altaic ancestry.

Before the deportation of the Crimean Tatars, Soviet publications about Crimean Tatars would acknowledge the huge cultural and linguistic different between the Steppe Crimean Tatars of Northern Crimea and the Coastal Dwellers in Southern Crimea. In addition, Soviet anthropologists studying archeology centered on the pre-Islamic populations of Crimea, such as Boris Kuftin, noted that their descendants were found among the Crimean Tatars. After their deportation, the Soviet government switched to rewriting history and erasing their acknowledgement of Crimean Tatars deep roots in Crimea.

The Steppe population is more linguistically, culturally, and genetically distinct from the Coastal and Mountain Tat subgroups. Historically Crimean Tatars of Romani descent were much more distinct from the Gadjo Crimean Tatar subethnic groups, over time the distinctions have decreased considerably. The Mountain and Southcoast Crimean Tatars are very culturally close and together made up approximately two-thirds of the general Crimean Tatar population in Crimea before they were deported. Historically, marriage between the different Steppe and Tat subgroups was rare.

=== Government recognition ===
Before the Deportation of the Crimean Tatars, academic literature about Crimean Tatars published by official state organs of the Soviet Union often compared the different subgroups and would mention them by name. However, after the deportation, the government took the position that Crimean Tatars were not composed of different subgroups but rather were a homogenous diaspora of the Volga Tatars. a theory that has since been refuted repeatedly. As of 2018, RIA Novosti, a media outlet wholly owned by the Russian government, currently officially acknowledges the existence of, and differences between, the different subethnic groups.

== Steppe ==
Steppe Crimean Tatars are the descendants of the nomadic Turkic peoples and tribes that inhabited the Black Sea steppe, including those that were part of the Golden Horde, an integral part of the Crimean Tatar people. Steppe Crimean Tatars made up the vast majority of the army of the Crimean Khanate, although most Crimean Tatars are from the two Tat subgroups. (Note: Also called Nogays. They are not to be confused with the Nogays of the Caucasus. The Steppe Crimean Tatars are sometimes called Col Tatars.) While Russian media often depicts the whole Crimean Tatar nation as "wolves of the steppe" that raided Russia, this role was actually limited to the Steppe Crimean Tatars. Before the deportation in 1944, they lived mainly in Northern and Central Crimea. Before becoming more sedentary, they lived in yurts, and later they lived in adobe houses with felt put on the inside of the walls.

=== Ethnonym ===
The Steppe Crimean Tatars should not be confused with the Nogays. The use of the ethnonym "Nogay" to refer to the Steppe Crimean Tatars is of disputed origin. According to one theory, the word "Nogai" was an exonym: the Steppe Crimean Tatars were originally called the Mountain Crimean Tatars, while the Mountain Crimean Tatar subgroup used to be called Mountain Tats, who would refer to Steppe Crimean Tatars as Nogays. However, Brian Glynn Williams postulates that Steppe Crimean Tatars adopted the name from Emir Nogay.

=== Genetics ===
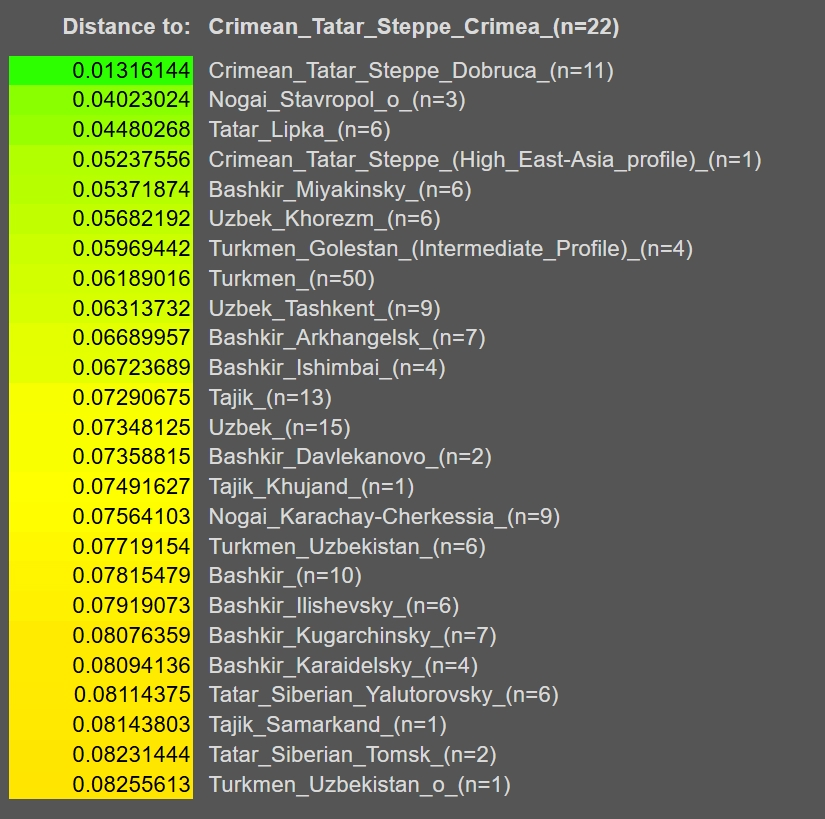
Autosomal distances of Steppe Crimean Tatars to peoples of the world. The closest are Steppe Crimean Tatars of Dobruca, Stavropol Nogai outliers and Lipka Tatars.

The Steppe Crimean Tatars are genetically closer to the Steppe Crimean Tatars of Dobruca (d=0.22) than to the Nogays of the Caucasus (d=0.25), which is comparable to the genetic distance of the Steppe Crimean Tatars from the Southcoast Tatars (d=0.25). At the same time, the Steppe Crimean Tatars are significantly closer to other subethnic groups of the Crimean Tatars than to the Kazakhs (d=0.68) and Mongols (d=0.84), which contradicts Soviet propaganda that branded them as Mongol invaders. Among the Steppe Crimean Tatars, to a degree comparable to other subethnic groups, haplogroups R1a-M198 (steppe lines), R1b-M343, G2a, J2, predominate. They are widespread in Eastern Europe and among the Turkic peoples of Russia, including the Caucasus, and are practically not represented among the Mongolians. Thus, the results of the genetic study conducted by Anastasiya Agdzhoyan in the laboratory of genomic geography of the N.I. Vavilov Institute of General Genetics of the Russian Academy of Sciences, disproves the hypotheses about the main origin of the gene pool of Crimean Tatars, including the Crimean Steppe Tatars, being from either from the Mongols or from Central Asian populations in general. The same study also rebutted the Soviet theory of origin from the Volga Tatars.

=== Cuisine ===
The Steppe Crimean Tatar diet consisted heavily of meat and grain. They switched from nomadic cattle breeding to sedentary agriculture in the 16th century.

== Mountain ==
The Mountain Crimean Tatars, usually called Mountain Tats or even just Tats, (Note: Historically, the term Tat referred to populations of non-Turkic descent, and so both Coastal and Mountain Crimean Tatars were called Tats. However, the use of the term Tat remained a common description for Mountain Crimean Tatars. Historically, the term Tat had a derogatory connotation.) and occasionally Hill Tatars are the largest subethnic group of the Crimean Tatars. They were known for building houses into the sides of mountains, such that they built only three walls with the mountain serving as one of the sides of the house. In the social hierarchy of the Crimean Khanate, Tats were below the Steppe Crimean Tatars, and their affairs were controlled by a minister called the Tat-ağası, which means "Lord of the Tats." Their ancestors began to adopt Islam when Turkic tribes arrived in the Crimean Highlands. As the Goths became more and more Tatarized, outsiders noticed they became indistinguishable from the other Turkic tribes in Crimea.

Mountain Tats were responsible for most of the agriculture in the Crimean Khanate. While the Steppe Crimean Tatars developed a reputation for skilled horsemanship due to their nomadic lifestyle, the sedentary Mountain Tats were noticed for being very unskilled in riding horses.

=== Genetics ===
The origins of Mountain Tat Crimean Tatars are the most diverse of the Crimean Tatar subethnic groups, with ancestry derived from a multitude of different pre-Russian populations of Crimea, of both Turkic and non-Turkic origins, in contrast to the narrower ancestral sources of the other subethnic groups. They are very closely related to the Southcoast Crimean Tatars.

=== Cuisine ===
The Mountain Tat diet was very diverse: they engaged in both cattle-breeding and agriculture. When they lived in Crimea, they were renowned for their vineyards and gardens, with fruit and vegetables being a key part of their cuisine.

== Southcoast ==
The Southcoast Crimean Tatars (Note: The Southcoast Crimean Tatars are also called Yalıboylu, Yaliboylu, Coastal Tats, and Coast-dwellers. Their self-name in the Crimean Tatar language is Yalıboylular.) were the last of the Crimean Tatar subethnic groups to adopt Islam and retained many of their pre-Islamic Greek customs far longer than even the Mountain Tats. They traditionally inhabited a narrow strip of land on the southshore of Crimea.

In contrast to the Steppe Crimean Tatars, who were skilled horseback riders, the Southcoast Crimean Tatars were rarely proficient at raiding and warfare on horses. In turn, Greek influence is very prominent in Yaliboylu culture. Their dialect belonged to the Oghuz language family and was very close to the Turkish language.

Many Southcoast Tats were initially deported to Siberian regions of the USSR, where they lived until the special settler regime was lifted and they were allowed to live among other exiled Crimean Tatars in Uzbekistan.

=== Cuisine ===
Traditional trades among the Southcoast Crimean Tatars included fishing and cultivation of fruit trees.

== Turkmens ==
Some groups once migrated from Anatolia, assimilated with Crimean Tatars and call themselves Türkmen (Turkmen). The name Tayfa (Note: Also spelled as Dayfa depending on the dialect.) is used in Crimea to refer them.

Although a growing number of academics support the theory that they are of Romani origin, they were mistaken for Romani people due to their dark complexion.

== Romani Crimean Tatars ==
While there is no exact consensus on the percentage or number of Crimean Tatars of Romani descent, the Crimean Roma are sometimes considered to the fourth main subethnic group of the Crimean Tatar people, with conservative estimates of their population being around 6,000 around the fall of the Soviet Union. Within the Crimean Roma community, there are subgroups, and clans within subgroups. They came to Crimea in several separate waves, and due to their Islamic faith they were able to assimilate quite well into the Crimean Tatar people.

=== Trades ===
While the Crimean Roma engaged in a variety of trades, including but not limited to basketweaving, blacksmithing, and grain hauling, they are particularly known for their contributions to Crimean Tatar music. Many of the most famous Crimean Tatar musicians are Romani.

=== Genetics ===
No genetic studies have focused on the Crimean Roma, as genetic studies of Crimean Tatars focus on the three largest subethnic groups. The extreme degree of assimilation into the Crimean Tatar community by the Crimean Roma has been cited proof that Romani people are not genetically predisposed to crime as claimed by far-right politicians; Crimean Tatar leader Mustafa Dzhemilev brought up their assimilation in a speech to the Council of Europe condemning scientific racism.

== Gallery ==
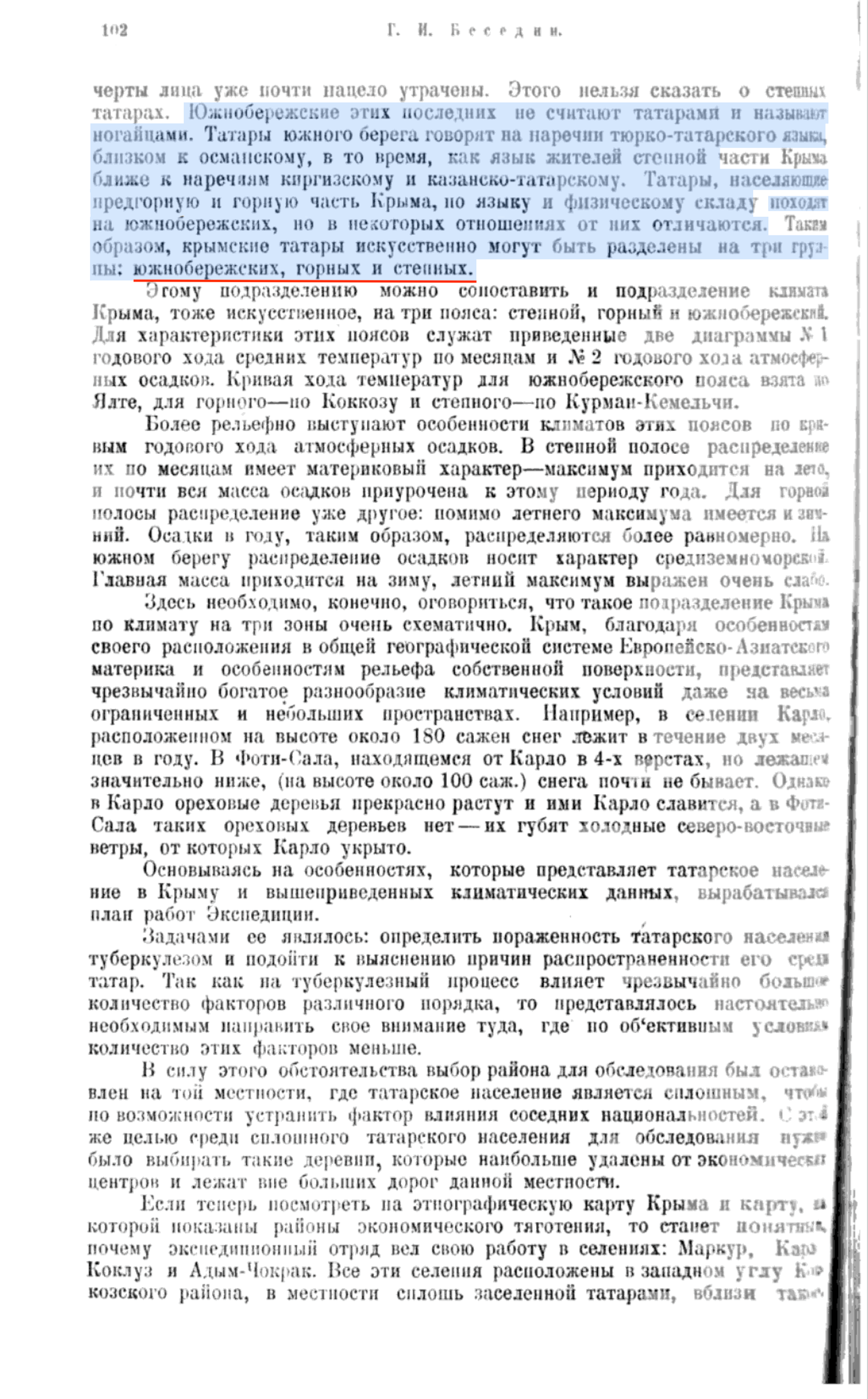
A page from an article about tuberculosis rates in Crimea from a 1925 Soviet medical journal that mentions the three main subethnic groups of the Crimean Tatar people by name (underlined in red for emphasis).

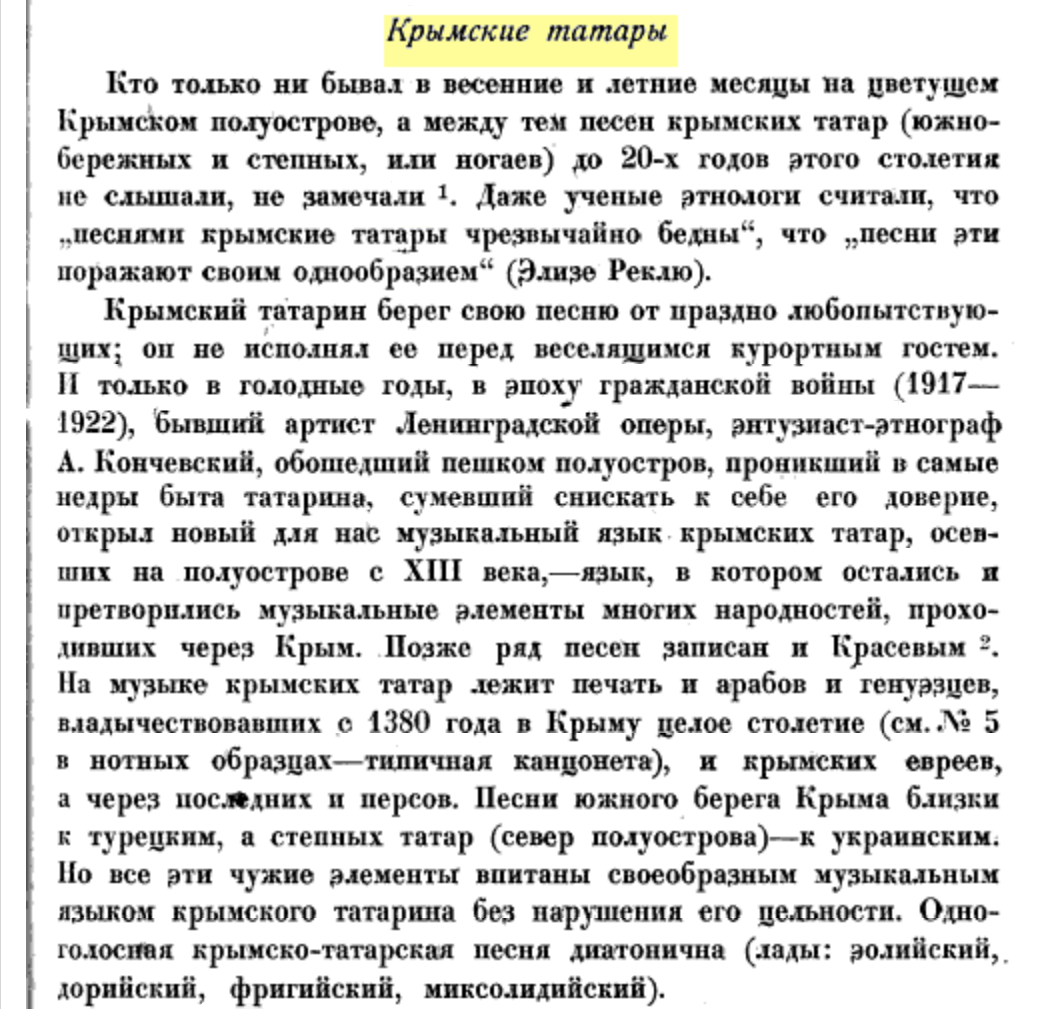
An excerpt from a 1930 academic article by Sergey Bugoslavsky about music in the Soviet Union that acknowledges the substantial differences between the Northern Steppe and Southcoast types of Crimean Tatars

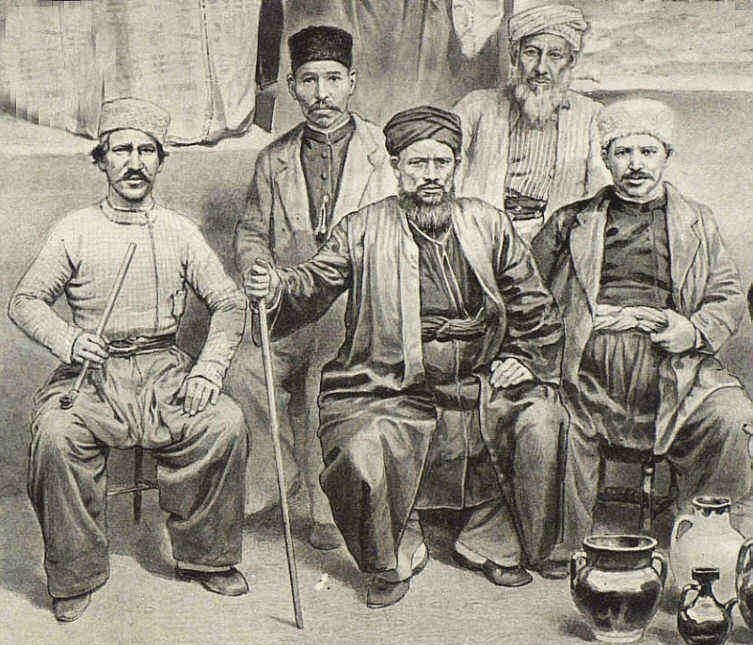
Illustration of Steppe Crimean Tatars in their traditional dress

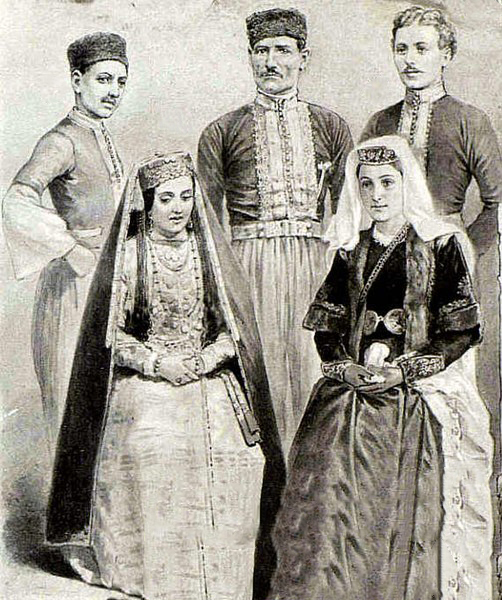
Illustration of Mountain and Coastal Tat Crimean Tatars in their traditional dress

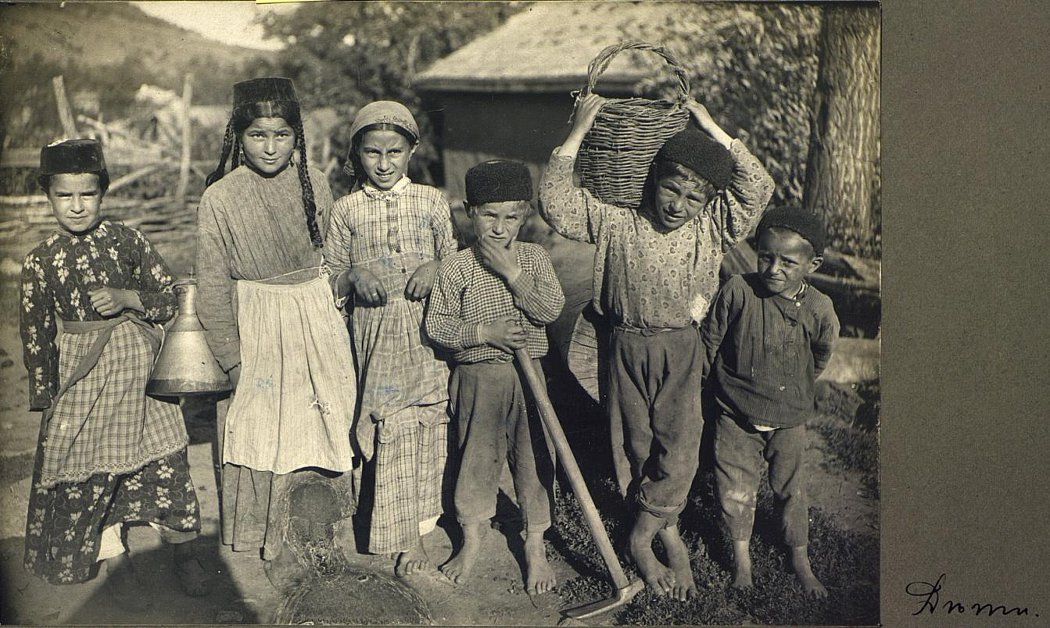
Photograph of Coastal Tat Crimean Tatar children in 1902

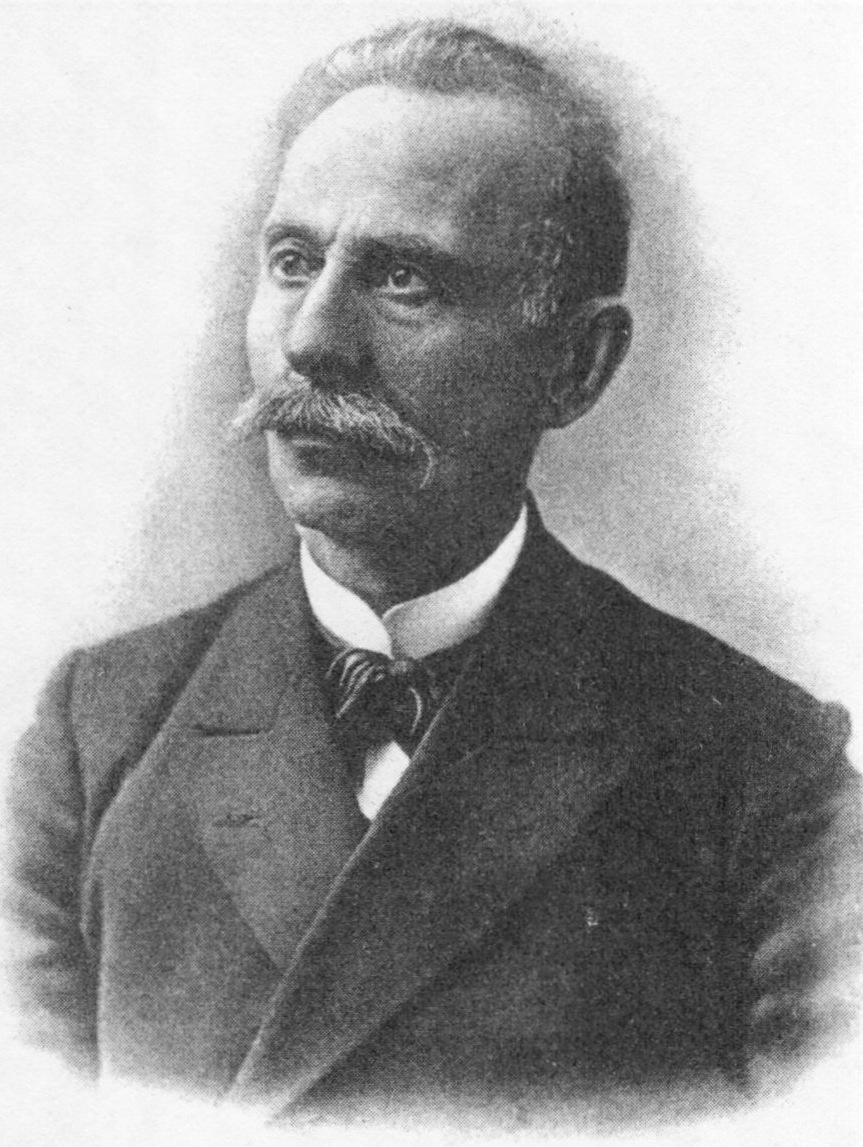
Ismail Gaspirali, a prominent Yaliboylu Crimean Tatar enlightener

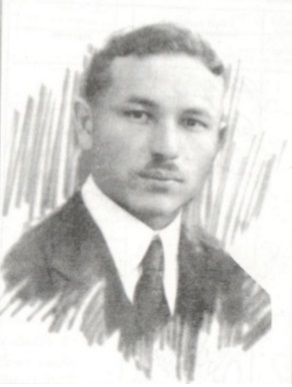
Bekir Çoban-zade, a prominent Steppe Crimean Tatar academic

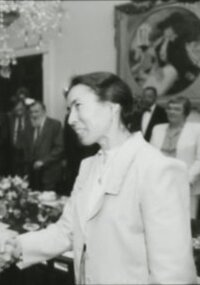
Ayşe Seitmuratova, Steppe Crimean Tatar civil rights activist

== See also ==
- Denial of Crimean Tatars by the Soviet Union
