= Denial of Crimean Tatars by the Soviet Union =

Soviet government policy in Crimea until 1989

Crimean Tatar denialism is the idea that the Crimean Tatars are not a distinct ethnic group. After the deportation of the Crimean Tatars, the Soviet government no longer recognized Crimean Tatars as a distinct ethnic group and forbade internal passports and official documents from using the term in the nationality section despite previously permitting it. The non-recognition of Crimean Tatars was emphasized by the wording of Ukaz 493, which used the euphemism "Citizens of Tatar nationality formerly living in Crimea." Only in 1989 were all restrictions on the use of the term lifted.

== Origins of Crimean Tatars ==
Despite the name, Crimean Tatars do not originate from Tatarstan. Instead, they are composed of four main sub-ethnic groups of different origins. The Steppe Crimean Tatars are of Kipchak Nogay origin; the Mountain Tats descend from all pre-Nogay inhabitants of Crimea who adopted Islam; the Yaliboylu Crimean Tatars are Oghuz descended from coastal Europeans like Greeks, Italians, and Armenians who converted to Islam after the arrival of the Golden Horde; and the Crimean Roma are a mixture of different waves of Romani Muslims who came to Crimea before Russian rule.

== Pseudoscientific theory of Crimean Tatar origins ==
Many Communist Party members mistakenly believed that the Crimean Tatars were a diaspora of Volga Tatars (Note: Volga Tatars are usually just called Tatars, leading to many people mistakenly thinking that other ethnic groups formerly or currently called Tatars were subgroups of the Volga Tatars. However, Crimean Tatars are not descended from the Volga Tatars at all.) from the Tatar ASSR, now called Tatarstan. Crimean Tatars who asked the government to restore Crimean ASSR were told by the government that it was "inexpedient" to restore their republic since the Tatar ASSR already existed, even though the government restored the national republics of the other deported ethnic groups and the Crimean Tatars have no ancestral ties to Tatarstan. Despite the Crimean Tatars being a completely different ethnic group to Volga Tatars, the government continued to deny that Crimean Tatars were a distinct ethnic group and suggested that they relocate to the Tatar ASSR if they wanted a national autonomy.

== Denialism and censorship ==
Before the deportation of Crimean Tatars in 1944, the term Crimean Tatar was widely allowed to be used in censuses, academic literature, and general use in cultural life. Still, after the deportation, the term was subject to censorship.

The very first sentence of Decree no. 5859ss, the decree ordering the deportation of Crimean Tatars, used the term Crimean Tatar, specifically saying, "many Crimean Tatars betrayed the Motherland." Later government decrees about Crimean Tatars avoided using the term "Crimean Tatar"; Ukaz 493 of 1967, which stated that accusations of universal treason laid against Crimean Tatars were unreasonable, described Crimean Tatars only as "Citizens of Tatar nationality, formerly living in the Crimea." Throughout the era of the Crimean Tatar exile, the Soviet government made many attempts to cover up the existence of Crimean Tatars as a distinct ethnic group to the Soviet public to maintain a fiction that Crimean Tatars were a subgroup of the Volga Tatars.

While Crimean Tatars were able to get away with using their ethnonym in passing mention in limited circumstances, like occasional mentions in the newspaper Lenin Bayrağı, usage of the term "Crimean Tatar" was almost always successfully censored. All token Crimean Tatar cultural activities were treated as manifestations of a subgroup of the Volga Tatars. The Crimean Tatar dance ensemble Haytarma (Note: The ensemble was originally called the "State Song and Dance Ensemble of the Crimean Tatars" before the deportation.) was forbidden from calling itself a Crimean Tatar dance group; Titles of books about Crimean Tatar music and the Crimean Tatar language were never allowed to use the word Crimean Tatar, and instead used vague titles that were non-specific to the subject being Crimean Tatar. Even the Crimean Tatar language department of the Nizami State Literature Institute in Tashkent could not be called a Crimean Tatar language faculty and was named "Tatlit" instead. Only in perestroika were Crimean Tatar academics allowed to use the term "Crimean Tatar" in their dissertations about their language.

Over time, the government went beyond simply censoring the word "Crimean Tatar", and by 1983, Lenin Bayrağı was prohibited from using many words important to Crimean Tatar identity. The restrictions went beyond forbidding the use of Crimean Tatar language names for Crimean toponyms mentioned in articles, but also the term "Crimean ASSR" and even "Crimean Radio Committee."

In the Surgun era, Crimean Tatar musicians were forbidden from performing songs that alluded to or were perceived as alluding to Crimea. The lyrics of the songs were limited to very narrow themes, such as cotton.

=== Misrepresentations of nationality of Crimean Tatars heroes ===
Uzeir Abduramanov, a full-blooded Crimean Tatar born and raised in Crimea, was labeled as an Azerbaijani in a photo gallery of Heroes of the Soviet Union in a 1944 issue of the popular magazine Ogonyok. Crimean Tatar national hero and double Hero of the Soviet Union Amet-khan Sultan always personally identified himself as a Crimean Tatar, and was described as a Crimean Tatar in newspaper articles about his heroism that were published before the deportation, but was often described as a Dagestani in post-deportation media, such as in his obituary in the newspaper Dagestan Pravda.

=== Return of the term ===
In 1984 the government of the Uzbek SSR began formally allowing use of the term in very limited contexts, such as specifying the language of newspapers and radio programs. Despite this, the government continued to withhold official recognition of Crimean Tatars as a distinct ethnic group. Only in 1989 were Crimean Tatars recognized as a separate ethnic group, and all restrictions on using the term "Crimean Tatar" were lifted. While Crimean Tatars were heavily restricted in using their ethnonym, the government freely used the term in the context of describing accusations of mass treason by Crimean Tatars, like the 1987 TASS statement issued at the start of the Gromyko Commission in perestroika that heavily detailed allegations of collaboration, many false, by Crimean Tatars during World War II.

== Effects ==
Soviet denial of Crimean Tatar identity had the opposite effect of what the Soviet government intended to achieve; instead of getting Crimean Tatars to abandon their identity, it invigorated Crimean Tatar nationalism and swayed the Crimean Tatar population towards further mistrust of the USSR.

== Gallery ==
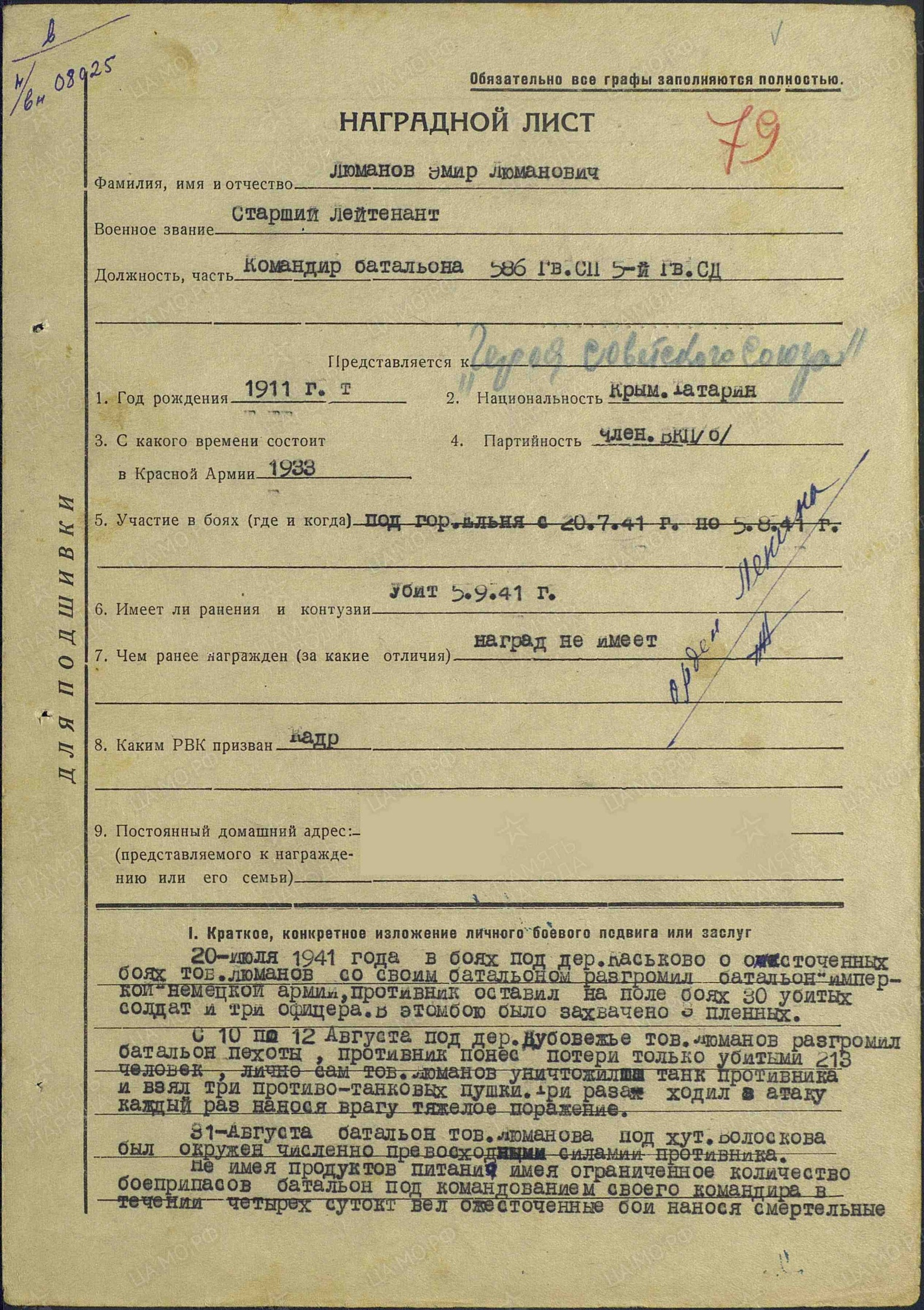
The term Crimean Tatar was permitted to be used in the nationality column of official documents before 1944, like this award sheet nominating Emir Lyumanov for the title Hero of the Soviet Union.

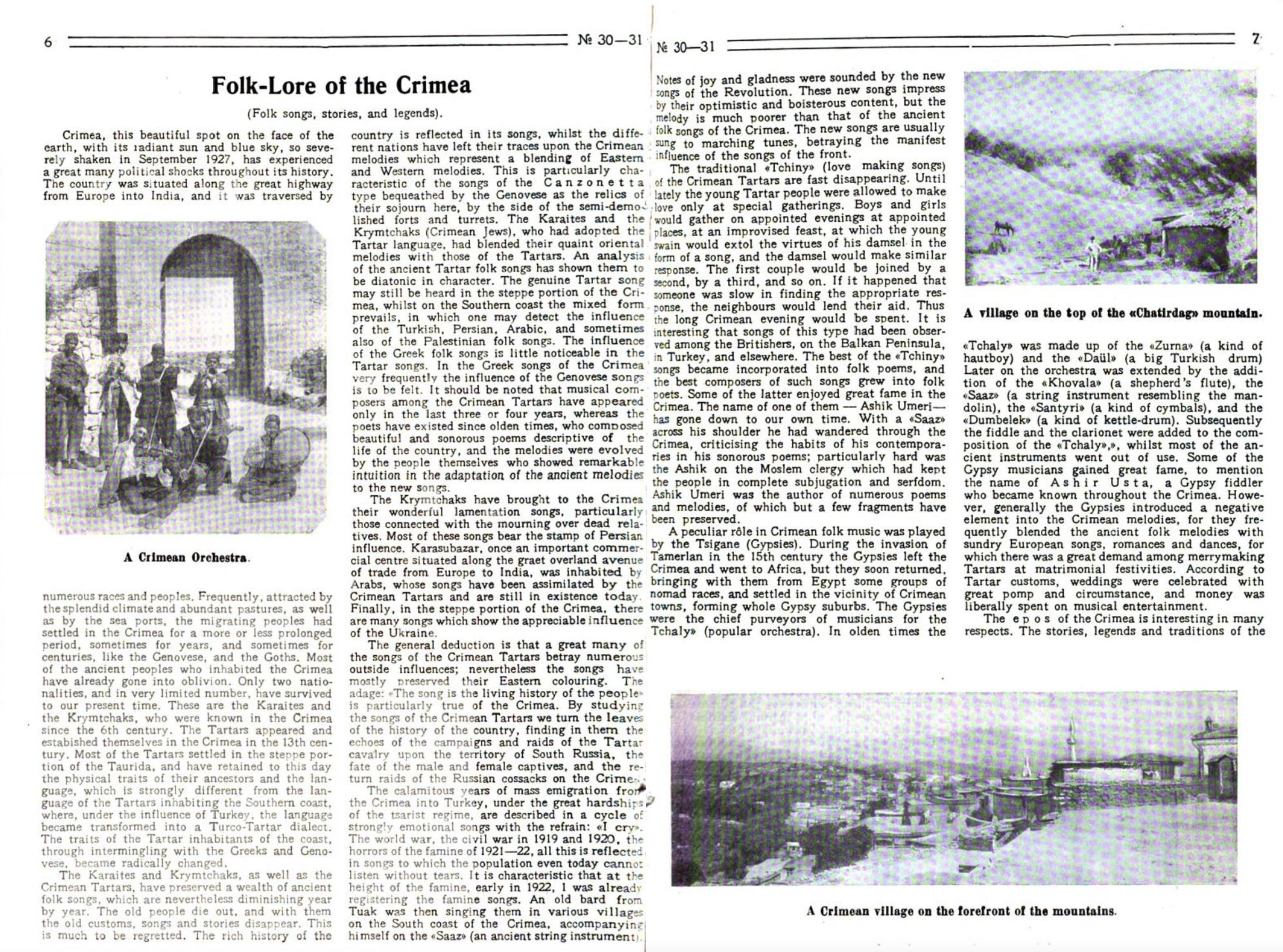
This article from the Soviet propaganda magazine Weekly News Bulletin issue from 1928 uses the term "Crimean Tartar," an alternative spelling of the term "Crimean Tatar."

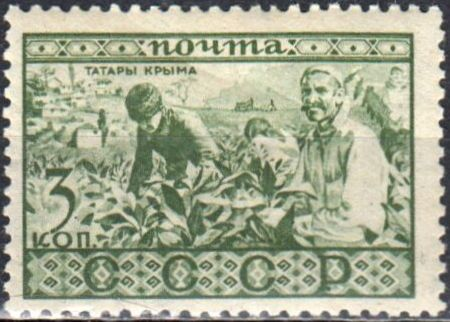
A 1933 Soviet postage stamp featuring Crimean Tatars from the "Peoples of the Soviet Union" postage stamp series. At the time, Crimean Tatars were considered a separate ethnic group in Soviet censuses.

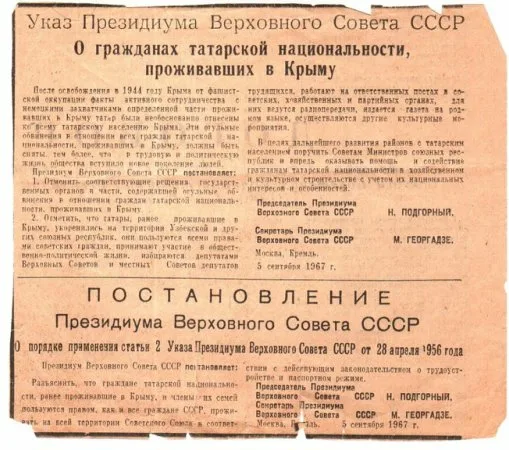
Clipping from 1967 Soviet newspaper with Ukaz 493. At the time, Crimean Tatars were not considered a distinct ethnic group and the term "Crimean Tatar" was censored from titles of written works, so the decree uses the term “Citizens of Tatar nationality formerly living in Crimea."

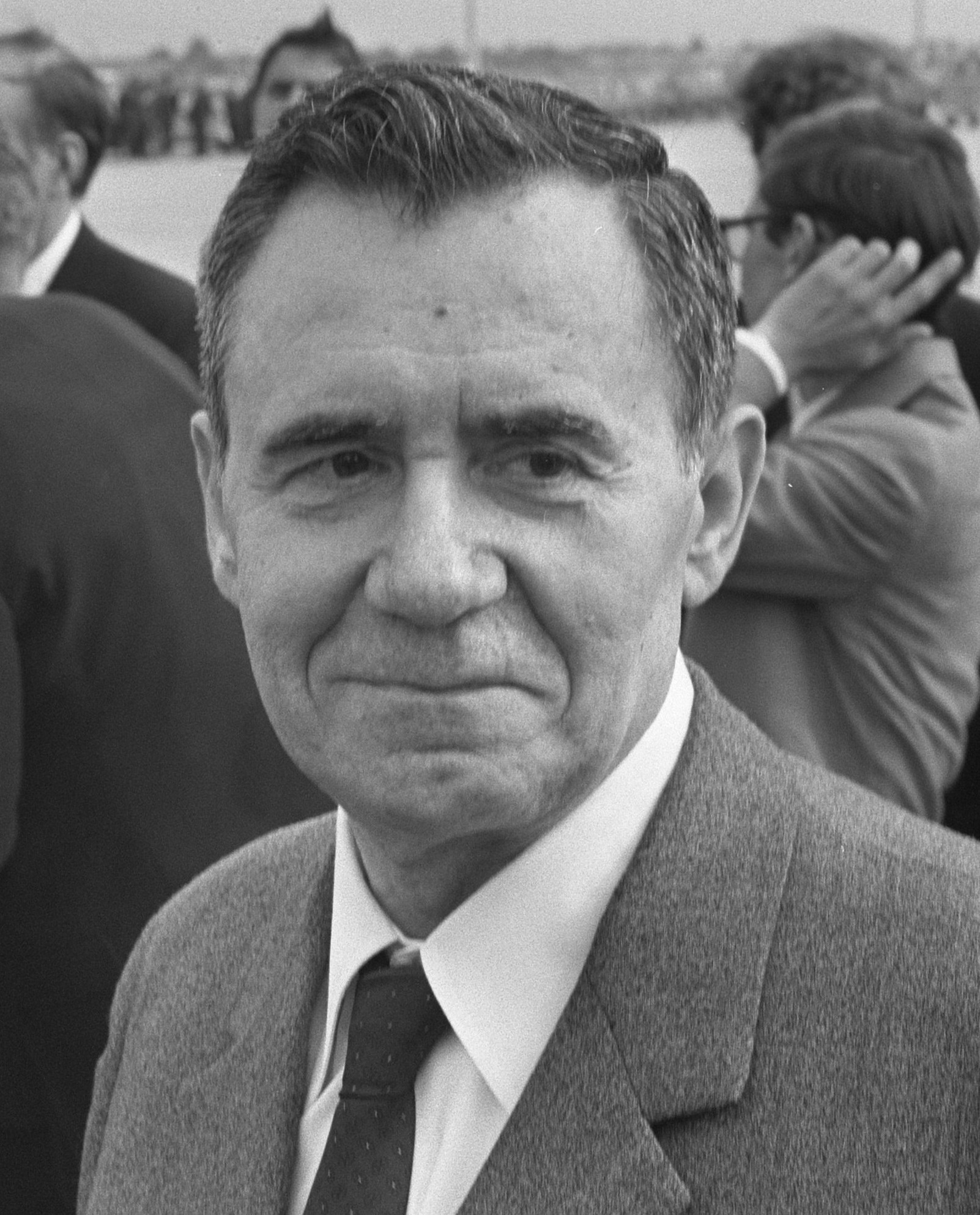
Soviet politician Andrey Gromyko was a major proponent of Crimean Tatar denialism: he described Crimean Tatars as an "invented people" to their face in a 1987 meeting with a delegation of Crimean Tatars (see Gromyko Commission)

== See also ==
- Denial of Kurds by Turkey
