= Haytarma (ensemble) =

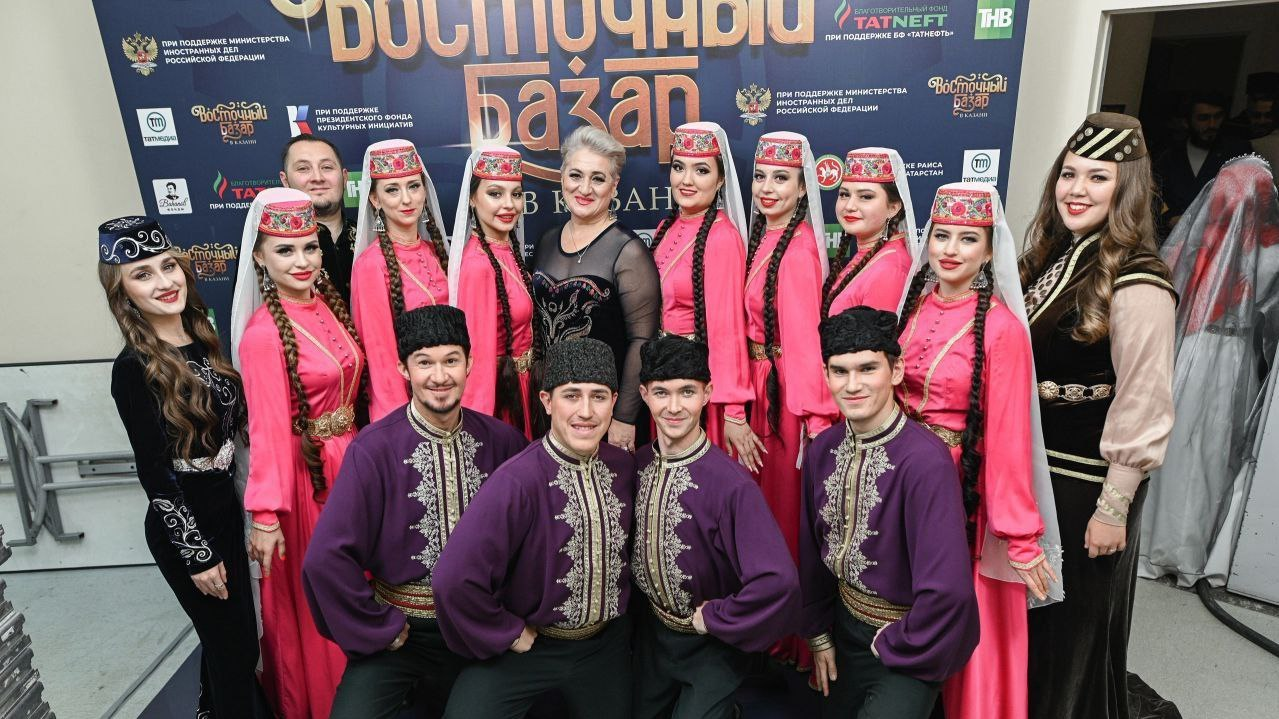
The ensemble featuring Elmira Nalbantova at the Oriental Bazaar festival in Kazan, October 31, 2023.

The Haytarma ensemble, originally called the State Song and Dance Ensemble of the Crimean Tatars is a Crimean Tatar music and dance group. The group was formed in Simferopol in 1939 with the Crimean State Philharmonic with Ilyas Bakhshish as artistic director, Yaya Sherfedinov as musical director, and Usein Bakkal as choreographer. After the deportation of the Crimean Tatars in 1944 the ensemble was abolished, but in 1957 the group was re-established in exile in Uzbekistan. The ensemble re-established in Crimea in 1992 after the return of Crimean Tatars to Crimea. Many famous Crimean Tatar artists worked for the ensemble at some point, including Enver Sherfedinov, Sabriye Erecepova, Edem Nalbandov among many others.

Because of censorship of the word "Crimean Tatar", the re-created group called itself the Haytarma ensemble instead of calling it the original name, the State Song and Dance Ensemble of the Crimean Tatars. What songs the ensemble was allowed to perform during the exile era was heavily restricted by censorship, since songs that referenced Crimea or were perceived as alluding to Crimea were prohibited.
