= Edem Nalbandov =

- Born: 25 December 1926; Qapsihor, Crimean ASSR, RSFSR, USSR
- Died: 22 May 1999 (aged 72); Simferopol, Ukraine
- Awards: Honored Worker of Culture of the Uzbek SSR (1977); Honored Artist of Ukraine (1996)

Edem Useinovich Nalbandov (Note: Sometimes spelled Nalbantov (Налбантов).) (Ukrainian: Едем Усеїнович Налбандов; Russian: Эдем Усеинович Налбандов; 25 December 1926 — 22 May 1999) was a Crimean Tatar composer and choirmaster. He received various accolades for his work including the honorary titles Honored Worker of Culture of the Uzbek SSR in 1977 and Honored Worker of Art of Ukraine in 1996. He became a member of the Union of Composers of the USSR in 1977.

== Biography ==
Nalbandov was born in Qapsihor on 25 December 1926 to the family of a blacksmith; however, the family moved from Qapsihor to Qarasubazar due to famine in 1933. His family wanted him to carry on the family tradition of blacksmithing, but he wanted to be a musician. In 1936 he enrolled in music school to play the violin. Like all Crimean Tatars living in Crimea at the time, in 1944 deported, originally to the Mari ASSR. While living in the Mari ASSR he survived a logging accident, worked as a projectionist, and played the violin at film screenings. In 1951 he was arrested for violating the special settler (curfew) regime. He later moved to Leninabad, Tajik SSR where he entered music college in 1950. After graduating in 1954, he worked as a music teacher in the Mari ASSR. After moving to the Uzbek SSR he attended the Tashkent State Conservatory, which he graduated from in 1962. In 1964 he joined the Haytarma ensemble at the suggestion of Abselâm Islâmov, who was chief editor of Lenin Bayrağı at the time. He co-authored with Ilyas Bakhshish a collection of Crimean Tatar folksongs. He moved to Bekabad in 1970 but travelled throughout the Uzbek SSR to study and teach music. He taught music at the Tashkent Institute of Culture from 1980 to 1983. He returned to Crimea in 1993, and taught at a music school in Simferopol.

== Legacy ==
His major works include writing the music for Yusuf Bolat's musical comedy "The Miserable Wedding" and many of his songs remain very popular in Crimea. He pioneered innovations in development of Crimean Tatar music, combining instrumental and choir aspects, and wrote over 300 melodies. He died on 22 May 1999. His daughter Elmira Nalbantova is also an artist.
