= Enver Sherfedinov =

Enver Sherfedinov (Russian: Энвер Шерфединов, Crimean Tatar: Enver Şerfedinov; 1 June 1936 – 22 November 2007) was a Crimean Tatar musician of Tayfa origin. He mastered playing 18 different musical instruments, but is most renowned for his violin music, earning himself the label of "The Crimean Tatar Paganini" and "the soul of the people" for his huge contributions to Crimean Tatar music and culture. He is held up as an inspiration to other Crimean Tatar musicians. He did not know musical notation, instead only knowing music by ear. He contributed a lot to the Haytarma ensemble and was extremely versatile in his work, performing not just Crimean Tatar music but also music of many other nationalities including Uyghur, Hungarian, and Korean.
