= Sabriye Erecepova =

- Born: 12 July 1921; Bağçasaray, Crimea
- Died: 18 September 1977; Tashkent, Uzbek SSR, USSR
- Occupation: Singer
- Awards: Honoured Artist of the Uzbek SSR (1964)

Sabriye Erecepova (Crimean Tatar: Sabriye Kerim qızı Erecepova; 12 July 1912, Bağçasaray, Taurida Governorate — 18 September 1977, Tashkent, Uzbek Soviet Socialist Republic) was a Crimean Tatar singer. She began working for the Crimean Radio Committee in 1932 after impressing Yaya Sherfedinov and was awarded the title Honored Artist of the Crimean ASSR in 1940. In exile she remained a very popular singer and was labeled as the most popular singer in the Uzbekistan in 1964. She not only sang traditional Crimean Tatar songs but also wrote her own songs and sang Russian folksongs too.
