= Yaya Sherfedinov =

Crimean Tatar composer, musician and poet (1894–1975)

- Yaya Şerfedinov
- Born: 16 March 1894; Feodosia, Russian Empire
- Died: 29 January 1975 (aged 80); Tashkent, Uzbek SSR, USSR
- Awards: Honored Worker of Arts of the Crimean ASSR (1940); Honored Worker of Arts of the Uzbek SSR (1971); Honorary diploma of the Presidium of the Supreme Soviet of the Uzbek SSR (1974)

Yaya Sherfedinov (Crimean Tatar: Yaya Şerfedinov, Russian: Яя Шерфединов; 16 March 1894 — 29 January 1975) was a Soviet-Crimean Tatar composer, musician, and poet. Born to a poor family in Feodosia, he began playing the violin at a young age. He was a graduate of the prestigious Moscow Conservatory. Before exile from Crimea, he worked in Crimea for the Crimean Radio Committee, the Crimean Tatar State Drama Theater, and the State Song and Dance Ensemble of the Crimean Tatars. When he was not composing new music, he wrote down compilations of many Crimean Tatar folksongs. In exile in Uzbekistan, he continued his musical work, and expanded to writing music for an Uzbek play, working with Uzbek composer Toʻxtasin Jalilov; however, most of his work centered around Crimean Tatar folksongs. His works spanned many themes.

== See also ==
- Enver Sherfedinov

== Literature ==
- Sherfedinov, Yaya (1 January 1968). "Niyetim". Lenin bayrağı (in Crimean Tatar). p. 3.
- Tikhnova, T. (31 May 1974). "Putʹ v iskusstvo" Путь в искусство. Pravda Vostoka (in Russian). p. 3.
