= Morske, Crimea =

Morske Морське
- Village
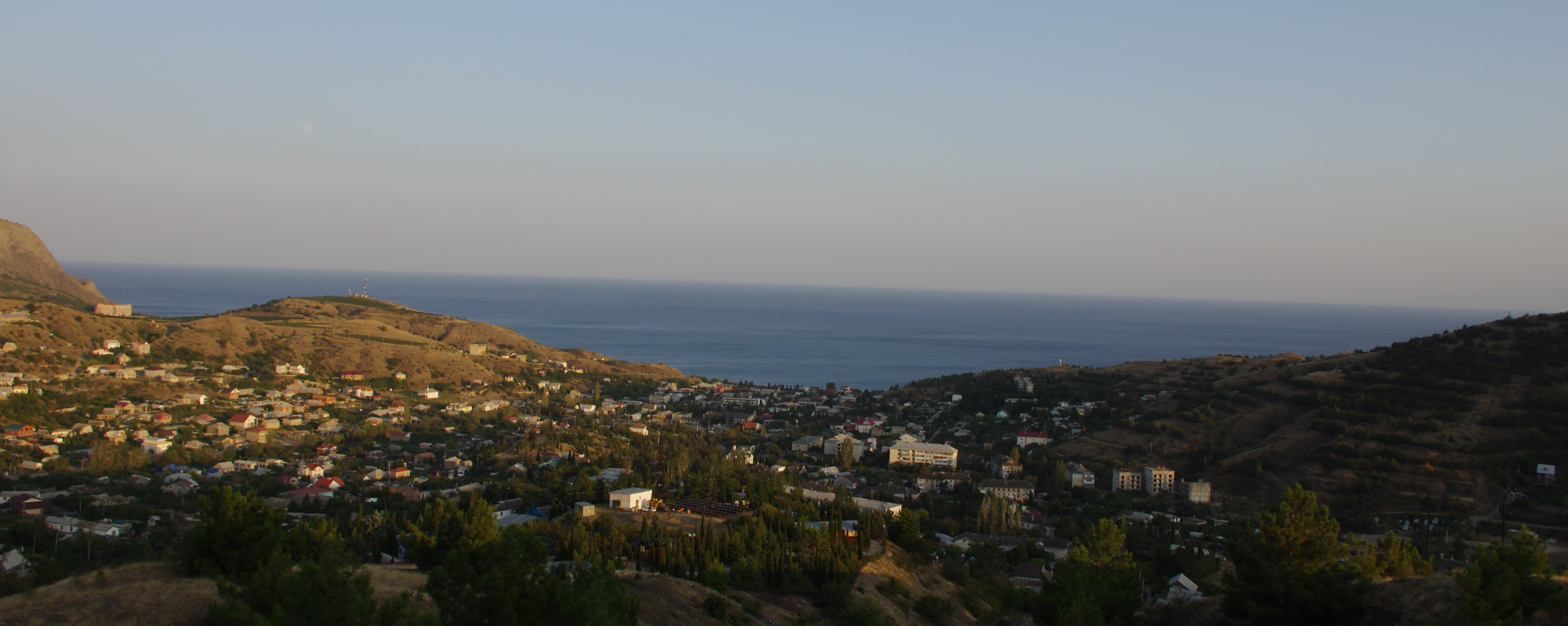

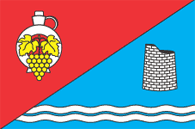
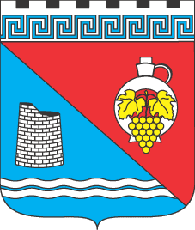
- Flag Coat of arms

- Location of Morske in Crimea
- Coordinates: 44°49′50″N 34°48′05″E
- Republic: Crimea
- Municipality: Sudak Municipality
- First mentioned: 1380
- Elevation: 43 m (141 ft)

Population (2014)
  - Total: 2,394
- Time zone: UTC+4 (MSK)
- Postal code: 98033
- Area code: +380 6566
- Website: http://rada.gov.ua/

Morske or Morskoye (Ukrainian: Морське; Russian: Морское) is a village in the Sudak Municipality of the Crimea, a territory recognized by a majority of countries as part of Ukraine and annexed by Russia as the Republic of Crimea.

Previously, the settlement was known as the Kapsikhor village (Crimean Tatar: Qapsihor). Following the forced deportation of the Crimean Tatars in 1944, the Presidium of the Supreme Soviet of the Russian SFSR published a decree on May 18, 1948, renaming the settlement along with many others throughout Crimea from their native Crimean Tatar names to their current variants.

Morske is located on Crimea's southern shore on the Black Sea at an elevation of 43 m (141 ft). Its population was 2,245 in the 2001 Ukrainian census. The current population is 2,394 (2014 Census). The remains of the Choban-Kule fortification are located near the settlement.
