= Emir Lümanov =

Officer in the Red Army during World War II

- Emir Lüman oğlu Lümanov
- Born: 1911; Aqtaçı, Taurida Governorate, Russian Empire
- Died: 5 September 1941 (aged 29–30); Yelnya, Yelninsky District, Smolensk Oblast, RSFSR, USSR
- Military career
- Allegiance: Soviet Union
- Branch: Red Army
- Rank: Senior lieutenant
- Unit: 586th Rifle Regiment
- Conflicts: World War II; Yelnya offensive †
- Awards: Order of Lenin

Emir Lümanovich Lümanov (Crimean Tatar: Emir Lüman oğlu Lümanov, Russian: Эмир Люманович Люманов; 1911 – 5 September 1941) was an officer in the Red Army during World War II. After he was killed in battle against numerically superior German forces he was nominated for the title Hero of the Soviet Union, making him the first Crimean Tatar nominated for the title, but he was only awarded the Order of Lenin.

== Biography ==
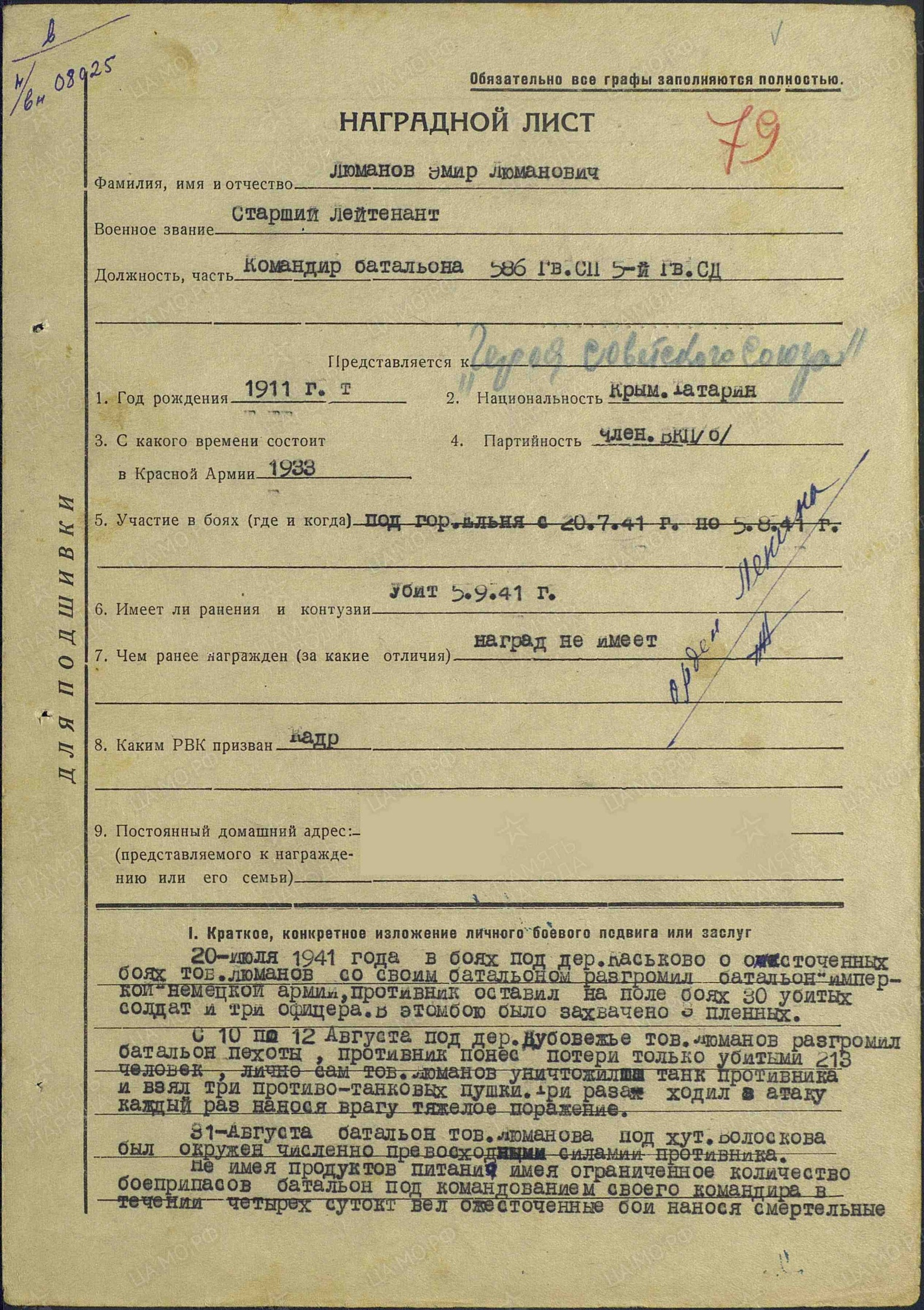
His award sheet nominating him for the title Hero of the Soviet Union

Lümanov was born in 1911 to a Crimean Tatar family in Aqtaçı (later renamed Furmanovka), and was the oldest child in his family. He became a member of the Communist Party in 1932 before joining the Red Army in either 1930 or 1933. (Note: Most sources report that he entered the Red Army in 1930, but his award nomination for the title Hero of the Soviet Union indicated that he entered the military in 1933.) At the time of the German invasion of the Soviet Union, he was a battalion commander in the 586th Rifle Regiment, commanded by Hero of the Soviet Union Ivan Nekrasov of the 5th Guards Rifle Division.

Since he spoke German, he went on a mission on 20 July 1941 where he dressed up in a Nazi military uniform pretending to be a Nazi commanding officer checking on a unit, only to then take the company as prisoners of war and thereby stop the enemy's advance.

The battles for Yelnya in August 1941 were extremely intense: on 11 August, he received orders to lead his battalion in advancing further into Yelnya to expel Nazi forces from the western slopes in the area. In one day of the battle, his battalion killed 200 Nazis. After receiving orders to advance further east, they went on to capture two tanks and four anti-tank guns from the Nazis. By 31 August, his battalion was running very low on ammunition and ran out of food, yet he continued to lead them in battle, at which point they were fighting off numerically superior forces. In four days they managed to break out of the encirclement, but Lümanov died in the heat of battle on 5 September 1941. He was posthumously nominated for the title Hero of the Soviet Union on 3 March 1942, but was awarded just the Order of Lenin instead. His feats and the feats of his battalion were covered by many Soviet newspapers including Pravda, Izvestiya, and Krasnaya Zvezda.
