= Crimean Roma =

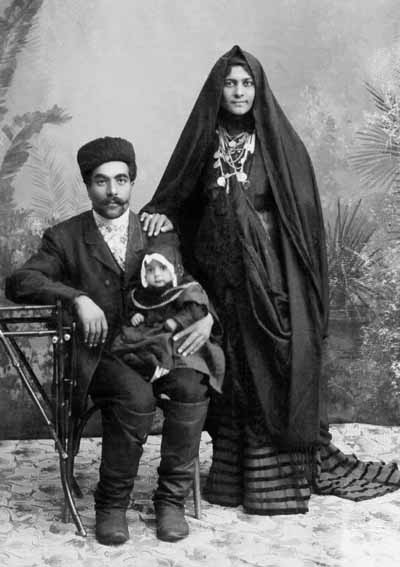
- Family of Crimean Roma in the Stavropol Governorate. Pre-Russian Revolution.

Total population
- 25,000

Regions with significant populations
- Russia, Ukraine

Languages
- Crimean Romani, Crimean Tatar

Religion
- Islam

Related ethnic groups
- Ursari • Ruska Roma • Gurbeti • Crimean Tatars

The Crimean Roma (also known as Crimean gypsies, or Çingene) (Note: Chingene) are a sub-ethnic group of the Muslim Roma heavily assimilated among Crimean Tatars to the point that they are now considered to be the fourth subgroup of Crimean Tatars. Currently, they live in many countries of the former Soviet Union, including Russia. They speak the Crimean Tatar language and their own Crimean Romani dialect. Crimean Roma traditionally practice Islam.

== Origins ==
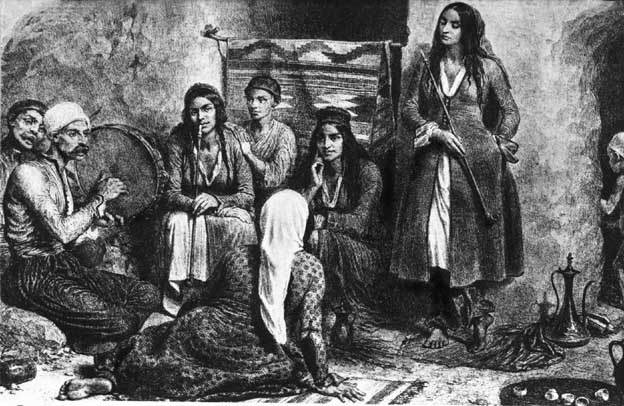
Auguste Raffet. Crimean gypsies. Lithograph, 1837

When exactly the first Romani people arrived in Crimea and where they lived before coming to Crimea differs greatly among sources and remains a controversial topic in Roma studies. Professor of Roma history Vadim Toropov claims that the first Romani people to arrive in Crimea came to the peninsula in either the 14th and/or 15th century, having previously lived in the area of Byzantium, while Crimean Tatar writer Nedzhati Seidametov claimed they were Turkmen who came to Crimea alongside the Golden Horde, and Pavel Nikolsky says that they came in separate waves, first in the 13th century alongside the Golden Horde and then later Roma moved to Crimea from the Balkans; more and more historians accept the mixed origins theory for the ethnogenesis of the Crimean Roma, with the consensus being that different Crimean Roma groups arrived in Crimea from different places at different times. In the Crimean Khanate, the Roma, like people of other nations, were not harassed; the authorities did not persecute them and they were not treated with contempt. In Crimea, they led a sedentary and semi-sedentary lifestyle, engage in productive labor and music. In the 18th century, Islam became the traditional religion of the Crimean gypsies. Roma researcher Nikolai Shtiber wrote in his essay on Roma in Crimea:

Все крымские цыгане исповедуют мусульманскую веру, многие из них выполняют даже заповеди Корана не менее строго, чем другие мусульмане. Крымские цыгане живут постоянно среди татарского населения, носят обыкновенно татарские имена, говорят свободно на татарском языке. В отношении одежды цыгане стараются подражать татарам: мужчины одеваются в халаты, покрывают голову татарской шапкой: цыганки на голове татарскую шапочку. Чингене в качестве ремесленников пользуются среди местного населения большим успехом и влиянием, к ним относятся как к честным труженикам. Некоторые из крымских цыган служат носильщиками на судах при нагрузке зернового хлеба; ведут разносную торговлю. Крымские цыгане играют на дауле, скрипке и зурне; они играют всюду, где только их приглашают; в городских кофейнях и гостиницах, на татарских свадьбах и вечерах.
All Crimean gypsies profess the Muslim faith, many of them even fulfill the commandments of the Koran no less strictly than other Muslims. Crimean gypsies live permanently among the Tatar population, usually have Tatar names, speak fluently in the Crimean Tatar language. With regard to clothing, the gypsies try to imitate the Tatars: men dress in bathrobes, cover their heads with a Tatar hat: gypsies wear a Tatar hat on their heads. Chingene as artisans enjoy great success and influence among the local population, they are treated as honest workers. Some of the Crimean gypsies serve as porters on ships when loading grain bread; carry on a peddling trade. Crimean gypsies play the daul, violin and zurna; they play wherever they are invited; in city coffee houses and hotels, at Tatar weddings, sünnet toy (circumcision evenings).

— Nikolai Shtiber

Historically, most musicians in Crimea were Crimean Roma, partially due to the stigma against musicians at the time.

=== Subgroups ===
There are two main subgroups of the Crimean Roma — the Krimurja and the Urmacheli. There are also subgroups of within each of the Crimean Roma communities: however, the castes of some subgroups were somewhat fluid in that people who switched professions and assimilated into the caste of said profession would be considered part of the caste, and there was some mixing between different groups. Crimean Roma are often called Chingene by non-Roma Crimean Tatars. Due to the fact that the different Crimean Roma all professed the Muslim faith and imitated Crimean Tatars in customs and dress, it was often difficult for the Russian population to tell about the Roma and non-Roma Crimeans at first glance.

==== Krimurja (Ayudzhi) ====
The Krimurja, (Note: They also call themselves Krimcurja, Kırımıtika/Kırımlitika Roma, Tatarika/Tataritika Roma, and Krimi/Krimci. They are usually called Ayudzhi/Ajudži by other Crimean Tatars, meaning "bear cub.") are descendants of Romani people who migrated to Crimea from the Balkans in different waves, but came later than the other Crimean Roma groups, some as late as the 19th century. Their dialect of the Romani language is close to the dialect of the Ursari. They do not refer to themselves as Ayudzhi, and some are even unaware of the exonym being used to describe them. The Krimurjia have held on to Roma traditions more than the other Roma groups. They are more nomadic than other Crimean Roma groups, they often lived in cities during the winter and on the Crimean steppe in the summer. Many sources report that the Krumurja were blacksmiths and bear trainers, however Marushiakova and Popov dispute the idea that the Krimurjia were blacksmiths and bear trainers, citing a lack of historical memory of those practices. The Krimurja are Muslims, and it is generally agreed that they were Muslims before they came to Crimea.

==== Urmacheli ====
The Urmacheli are Tatarized Romani people whose ancestors migrated from the Balkans to Crimea in the 16th century, and are probably the largest subgroup of the Crimean Roma. Although they do not deny their Romani origins, they are very Tatarized, and hold the status of a special ethnic group within the Crimean Tatar people, and are usually viewed as fellow Crimean Tatars. Other Romani peoples, such as the Krimurja (Ayudzhi) do not view the Urmacheli as real Romani people due to the extent of their assimilation. However, Urmacheli do retain some Romani vocabulary, and do sometimes refer to other Crimean Tatars of non-Roma origins as "gadjo". Originally many Urmacheli lived in Salachiq, where they became famous as excellent musicians. The Urmacheli divided themselves up by profession.

=== Turkmens ===
The exact origins of the Turkmen Tatars [Tatarized Turkmens], knows as Tayfa/Dayfa in Crimea, formerly called Gurbets/Kurbets (Note: The term Tayfa is used in Northern Crimea, while the term Dayfa is used in Southern Crimea. Tayfa/Dayfa are also called Gurbets and Trukmen or Turkmen. The origins of the term Gurbets is disputed, and may be a derivative of the word for beggar. The term Tayfa/Dayfa is a more recent development, the term becoming popular among the Tayfa during their exile in Uzbekistan. Other theories for the term Gurbet are that it was derived from being a label for Romani people in legal documents of the Ottoman Empire, and/or a connection to the term Gurbet being applied to Balkan Roma.) has been a subject of debate among anthropologists for centuries. Seraya Shapshal observed the Tayfa during his visit to Qarasubazar in 1910 and attributed their origins to the Turkmen, and presuming that they were called Gypsies by outsiders due to their semi-nomadic lifestyle at the time. Two years later in 1912, Alexander Samoylovich observed the Tayfa in Qarasubazar and attributed their origins to being Tatarized Romani people. Other theories suggest that they are derived from Balkan Romani Muslims, some theories indicate ancestral relations with the Stravpol and Astrakhan Turkmens, while Vadim Toporov speculates that they are not Romani at all but Kurds who were mistaken for Romani people, and who previously lived in the Georgian areas of the Ottoman Empire. Another theory for Turkmen Tatars origins held by some Turkmen Tatars is that they came from the city of Mersin in Turkey. There is no consensus for the origins of the Turkmen Tatars among the Turkmen Tatars themselves, and there is even disagreement about Turkmen Tatar origins within individual families. Historically they observed some Shia traditions such as mourning during Muharram, and singing ilahi chants, and some Crimean Tatars remain suspicious about their faith, but they are Sunni Muslims by faith. They almost always see themselves as primarily Crimean Tatars. The Turkmen Tatars are often called Chingene, but they consider the term to be very offensive. In the 1920s, the Soviet government pressured them to opt for a Gypsy identity and integrate them into the wider Crimean Gypsy community, but they refused, preferring to have a Crimean Tatar identity instead.

Although a growing number of academics support the theory that they are of Romani origin, they were mistaken for Romani people due to their dark complexion.

== In the Holocaust ==
Under Nazi law, Romani people had the same status as the Jews, and were targeted for extermination because of their ethnicity. In Crimea, the Nazis attempted to exterminate the Crimean Roma. Most of the mass murders of Crimean Roma took place from 1941 to 1942. One of the largest massacres of Crimean Roma took place in December 1941, within the massacre of the Krymchaks. Khrisanf Lashkevich, an eyewitness to the Nazi massacre of Crimean Roma in Southern Crimea described seeing the following:

Цыгане во множестве прибывали на подводах к зданию Талмуд-Торы. Они зачем-то высоко выставили зеленый флаг, символ магометанства, а во главе своей процессии посадили муллу. Цыгане старались уверить немцев, что они не цыгане, некоторые выдавали себя за татар, другие за туркмен, но их протестам не вняли - и всех отправили под охрану в большое здание.
The Gypsies arrived en masse on wagons at the Talmud-Torah Building. For some reason, they raised a green flag, the symbol of Islam, high and put a mullah at the head of their procession. The Gypsies tried to convince the Germans that they were not Gypsies; some claimed to be Tatars, others to be Turkmens. But their protests were disregarded and they were all put into the great building.

Many massacres of Crimean Roma were committed by Einsatzgruppe D, which reported killing 824 Crimean Roma between 16 November and 15 December 1941. In early January 1942, Otto Ohlendorf reported to Berlin that all gypsies in Simferopol had been killed, however, the unit continued killing Roma in Crimea for many more weeks, sometimes under the euphemism of "asocials." Massacres continued into 1942. In April 1942, the report of Einsatzgruppe D wrote that with rare exceptions of some in Northern Crimea, there were no longer any Crimean Roma left. Crimean Tatar intervention saved the lives of many Crimean Roma from the Nazis; the estimates of what percent of Crimean Roma survived the Holocaust vary, with some estimates being at around 30%, but there is widespread disagreement on how many survived due to the fluid identity of Crimean Roma who often self-designated themselves as Crimean Tatars. Many Crimean Roma were recorded as Tatar in their passports, which resulted in an official statistic of 2,064 Crimean Roma living in Crimea in 1939; however, historians Alex Kay, Jeff Rutherford, and David Stahel estimate that the total Crimean Roma population in Crimea before the war was somewhere between 3,500 and 4,000. One major factor that caused the Nazi persecution of Crimean Roma to reduce in 1942 and 1943 was because other Crimean Tatars insisted that the remaining Crimean Roma were not Romani at all, with some Crimean Tatars claiming that the Crimean Roma were actually a Turkic tribe of Turkmen origin, while others claimed that they were ethnically related to Iranic tribes. Many Crimean Roma survived the Holocaust because they passed themselves off as non-Roma Crimean Tatars. There is also a degree of ambiguity in the national identity of many of the Holocaust victims. In postwar depositions of surviving relatives of the from the massacre in Burlak-Toma village, where 45 Crimeans were rounded up and gassed, the surviving family members of the victims testified that they were non-Roma Crimean Tatars and falsely accused of being Roma by the village headman Matvey Ivanovich Krivoruchko; surviving witnesses also testified that the victims were Crimean Tatars of non-Romani descent, and not Chingene. The memorial to the people murdered in Simferopol in December 1941 mentions only the Jews and Krymchaks by name, making no mention of the Crimean Roma victims killed in the same massacre.

== Deportation and exile ==
Most Crimean Roma who survived the Holocaust were deported from Crimea in 1944 alongside other Crimean Tatars, and were largely forbidden from returning to Crimea until the late 1980s. Historian Mark Edele estimates that 1,109 surviving Crimean Roma were deported from Crimea during the deportation of the Crimean Tatars in 1944. However, due to the fact that the line between Tatarized Roma and Crimean Tatars of Romani descent was often very blurry, historians Elena Marushiakova and Vesselin Popov estimate that several thousand people of Romani descent were included in the deportation of 1944, but note that it is impossible to be certain because changes in ethnic identity make it difficult to establish who is of Romani heritage. A very small number of Crimean Roma were able to return to Crimea before 1989, by proving their Roma origins by showing they had some memory of their Roma language. The Krimurja were less affected by the deportation than other Crimean Roma, since they were more often recorded as Gypsies in their passports, but most lived in other parts of the USSR after the deportation, and remained semi-nomadic until the 1960s. Near the end of the Crimean Tatar exile, it was estimated that the Crimean Roma population living with the Crimean Tatar diaspora in Uzbekistan was somewhere between 5,000 and 6,000. Historian Olga Kucherenko postulates that the number if Crimean Roma being so much higher than the official figure of 1,109 who were reported as having been deported in 1944 may be the result of some Roma from other Romani communities assimilating into the Crimean Roma while they lived in Uzbekistan.

== In modern times ==
Most Crimean Roma accept a Crimean Tatar identity, and Crimean Roma have been accepted into the Crimean Tatar people as another subgroup of Crimean Tatars, right alongside the Steppe (Nogay), Mountain Tat, and Yaliboylu (Coastal) peoples of the Crimean Tatars. It is quite unclear just how many Crimean Tatars are of Roma origin, due to the extent of assimilation of Crimean Roma. Crimean Roma in Crimea live among other Crimean Tatars and do not live in separate neighborhoods. Many Crimean Roma work as musicians are very popular among the Crimean Tatar people, and other Crimean Roma work selling produce at markets and wealthier Crimean Roma run their own restaurants. Crimean Roma identity is somewhat fluid based on context, with some Crimean Roma categorically denying that they have any Roma background when in the presence of the Russian population. As of the early 2000s, Crimean Roma are the only Romani community in the world to be considered a subgroup of another ethnic group. Most people declared as Romani in modern Crimean censuses are not part of the Romani Crimean Tatars but are representatives of other Roma subgroups, since most Crimean Roma mainly identify as Crimean Tatars. In 2012, Chairman of the Mejlis of the Crimean Tatar People Mustafa Dzhemilev gave a speech parliamentary Assembly of the Council of Europe condemning discrimination against Romani people and categorically refuting the far-right pseudo-scientific idea that Romani people are allegedly genetically pre-disposed to crime, pointing out that the integration of Crimean Roma into Crimean society is proof that Romani people productively work and contribute to societies that accept them. Before the Crimean Tatar Mejlis was banned by the Russian authorities in Crimea back in 2016, the Crimean Roma participated in the Mejlis elections. Some popular Crimean Tatar musicians are Crimean Roma, and as such, the Crimean Roma are often regarded as the best musicians among the Crimean Tatars.

== See also ==
- Erromintxela - Kalderash Romani people who deeply integrated into Basque society
