= Rustem Umerov =

Ukrainian politician (born 1982)

- Рустем Умєров
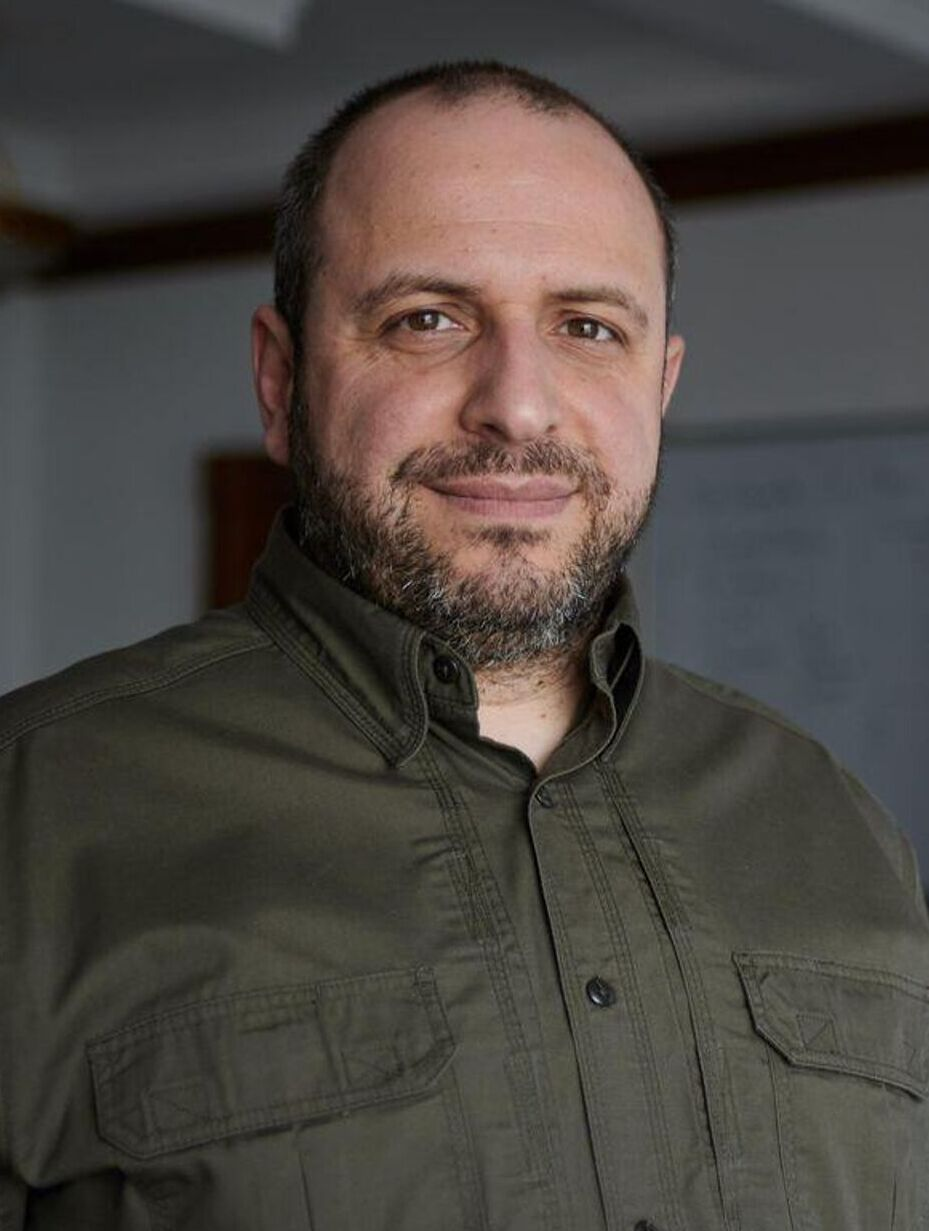
- Official portrait, 2023

Head of the Foreign Intelligence Service of Ukraine
- Incumbent
- Assumed office 3 August 2026
- President: Volodymyr Zelenskyy
- Preceded by: Oleh Luhovsky

Secretary of the National Security and Defence Council of Ukraine
- In office 18 July 2025 – 3 August 2026
- President: Volodymyr Zelenskyy
- Preceded by: Oleksandr Lytvynenko
- Succeeded by: Ihor Klymenko

18th Minister of Defense
- In office 6 September 2023 – 17 July 2025
- President: Volodymyr Zelenskyy
- Prime Minister: Denys Shmyhal
- Preceded by: Oleksii Reznikov
- Succeeded by: Denys Shmyhal

Head of the State Property Fund of Ukraine
- In office 7 September 2022 – 5 September 2023
- Prime Minister: Denys Shmyhal
- Preceded by: Dmytro Sennychenko
- Succeeded by: Olha Pishchanska

People's Deputy of Ukraine
- In office 29 August 2019 – 7 September 2022
- Constituency: Holos, No. 18

Personal details
- Born: 19 April 1982 (age 44) Krasnogvardeysk, Uzbek SSR, Soviet Union
- Party: Holos
- Children: 3
- Education: National Academy of Management; Igor Sikorsky Kyiv Polytechnic Institute

Rustem Enverovych Umerov (Ukrainian: Рустем Енверович Умєров; Crimean Tatar: Rüstem Enver oğlu Ümerov; born 19 April 1982) is a Ukrainian politician, businessman, investor, philanthropist and has served as the head of the Foreign Intelligence Service of Ukraine since 3 August 2026. Previously, he served as the Minister of Defence of Ukraine from 2023 to 2025 and as the Secretary of the National Security and Defence Council from 18 July 2025 to 3 August 2026. He is also a member of the Headquarters of the Supreme Commander-in-Chief.

Umerov is a former deputy head of the permanent delegation to the Parliamentary Assembly of the Council of Europe, a delegate of the Qurultay of the Crimean Tatar People, and an adviser to former Mejlis of the Crimean Tatar People chair Mustafa Dzhemilev. Since December 2020, Umerov has also co-chaired the Crimea Platform diplomatic initiative. In September 2023, amidst the Russian invasion of Ukraine, Ukrainian President Volodymyr Zelenskyy named Umerov to replace Oleksii Reznikov as defense minister of Ukraine.

== Early life and education ==
Umerov was born in 1982 in Bulungʻur (then known as Krasnogvardeysk), Samarkand, in the Uzbek Soviet Socialist Republic. His father, Enver Umerov, was an engineering technologist, while his mother, Meryem Umerova, was a chemical engineer. Umerov's family, Crimean Tatar Muslims originating from Alushta in the Crimean peninsula, an oblast of the Russian SFSR at the time, were deported on 18 May 1944 to the Uzbek SSR. After 50 years of exile and the beginning of Crimean Tatar repatriation during the late 1980s and early 1990s, the Umerov family returned to their homeland in Crimea, which had since become part of the Ukrainian SSR, in 1989.

While attending high school, Umerov participated in the Future Leaders Exchange program funded by the U.S. Department of State. As an exchange student, he lived in a host family and attended an American school for one academic year. Umerov received a bachelor's degree in economics and a master's degree in finance from the National Academy of Management.

== Career ==
In 2013, with his brother Aslan Ömer Qırımlı, Umerov founded the investment company ASTEM and its ASTEM Foundation. ASTEM manages investments in the fields of telecommunication, information technology, and infrastructure, mainly communication towers and fiber-optic networks.

The foundation funded Stanford University's Ukrainian Emerging Leaders program.

Since 2019, Umerov has been a People's Deputy of Ukraine from the Holos political party. In September 2022, the Verkhovna Rada (the Ukrainian parliament) appointed him as the head of State Property Fund of Ukraine.

Umerov is the President's Advisory Council Commissioner for Ukraine's Interaction with Arab and Muslim States. Following the February 2022 Russian invasion of Ukraine Umerov joined Ukraine's negotiation team with Russia in February 2022.

On 3 September 2023, Umerov was nominated by Ukrainian president Volodymyr Zelenskyy to replace Oleksii Reznikov as the Minister of Defence of Ukraine. Umerov was confirmed as the new Minister of Defense by the Verkhovna Rada on 6 September. The day before the Verkhovna Rada had formally accepted his resignation as the head of the State Property Fund.

== Political activity ==
In the July 2019 Ukrainian parliamentary election, Umerov was elected a People's Deputy of Ukraine from the Holos party. He has co-authored almost 100 bills, drafted a statement by the Verkhovna Rada on the illegitimacy of Russia's vote on amendments to the annexation of Crimea by the Russian Federation, and introduced a bill on the abolition of the Crimean free economic zone.

Umerov helped spearhead the construction of 1,000 apartments for internally-displaced Crimean Tatars and other Ukrainian citizens with Turkish support. In early April 2021, Zelenskyy and Turkish president Recep Tayyip Erdoğan agreed to begin building the apartments. Ukrainian Minister of Reintegration of Temporarily Occupied Territories Oleksii Reznikov and Turkish Minister of Environment, Urbanisation and Climate Change Murat Kurum signed an agreement in which Turkey would build 500 apartments: 200 in Mykolaiv, 200 in Kherson, and 100 in Kyiv.

In May 2020, he co-authored a bill on the payment of hospital bills to physicians because of COVID-19, regardless of length of service and at 100 percent of the average salary. In September 2020, Umerov and other deputies initiated a resolution on the redistribution of money from the Fund to Fight COVID-19 to ensure safe education during quarantine.

He co-authored a bill establishing a procedure for recognizing stateless persons. The law, allowing such persons to legally remain in Ukraine and obtain a document certifying their identity and status, took effect on 18 July 2020. Umerov collaborated on a bill exempting internally-displaced persons from tourist tax for living in temporary accommodations that was signed into law on 12 October 2020.

In April 2021, Umerov stated that Ukraine would not supply water through the North Crimean Canal to Crimea while Russian occupation continued. Umerov said that because Russia has violated international law, it is responsible for the humanitarian needs of the Crimean people.

=== International activity ===
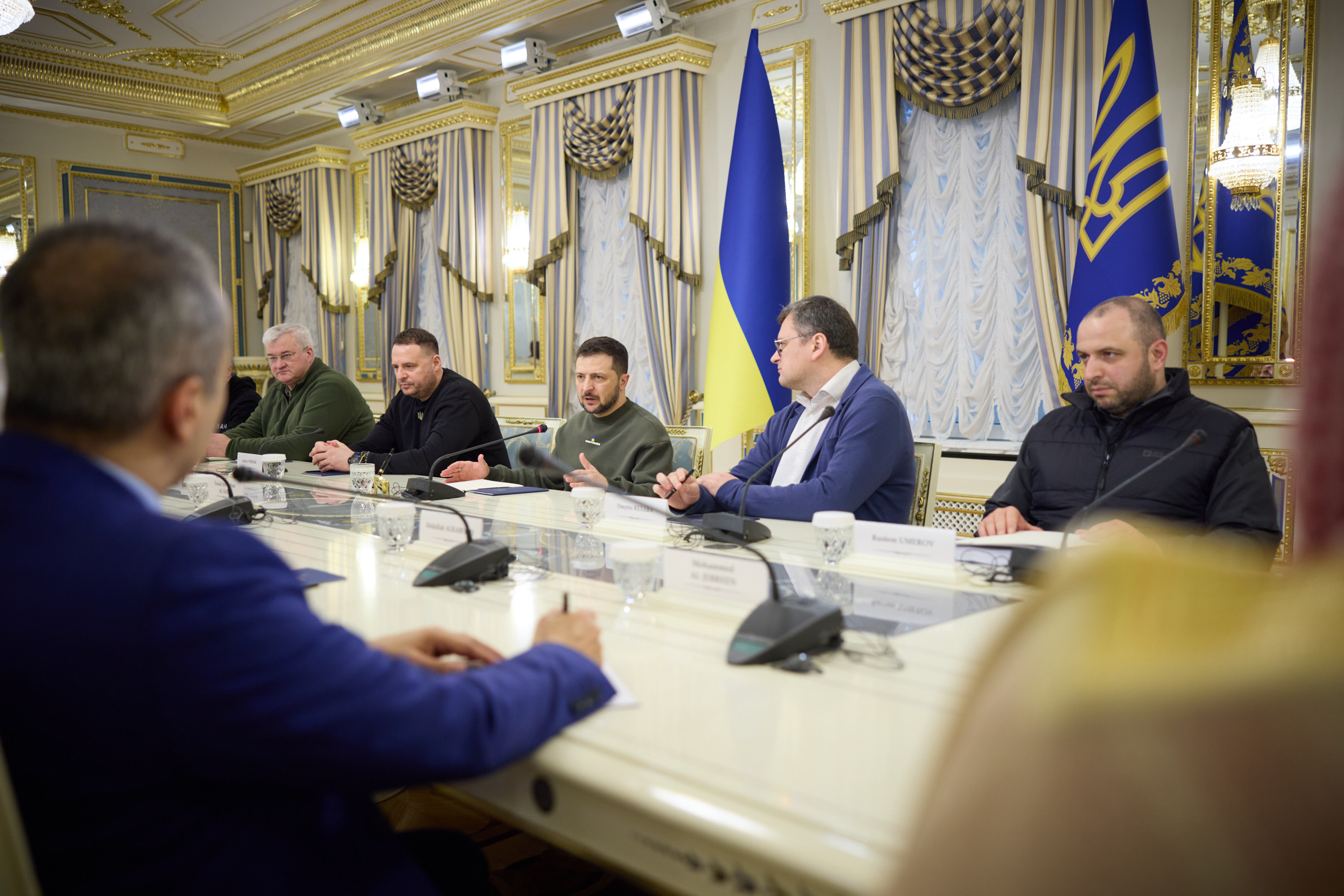
Rustem Umerov (right), Ukrainian President Volodymyr Zelenskyy and Minister of Foreign Affairs Dmytro Kuleba with Saudi Foreign Minister Faisal bin Farhan Al Saud in Kyiv on 26 February 2023

Umerov was deputy head of the permanent delegation to the Parliamentary Assembly of the Council of Europe (PACE). He co-chaired the groups for inter-parliamentary relations with Saudi Arabia and Turkey. In May 2020, he appealed to the UN, the European Parliament, the Parliamentary Assembly of the Council of Europe, the OSCE, NATO, and the Organization of the Black Sea Economic Cooperation to honor victims of the Crimean Tatar genocide and condemn Russia's violations of their rights and freedoms.

In January 2021, as part of a delegation to the PACE winter session, Umerov raised the issue of violation of the rights of Ukrainians and Crimean Tatars in Crimea by the Russian occupiers. Ukrainians and Crimean Tatars, due to their ethnic affiliation and Ukrainian position, are subject to inspection by the occupation administration, which results in repression and illegal imprisonment. Ethnic profiling results in the failure to provide medical care to Russian political hostages.

Umerov raised the issue of allegedly compulsory vaccination by Russia of Ukrainian citizens in Crimea with its Sputnik V COVID-19 vaccine.

He met with international partners to inform them about the alleged systemic human-rights violations, including those against Crimean Tatars in Crimea.

According to a source close to Ukraine's security forces, Umerov established good relations with Turkey's foreign minister Hakan Fidan. In May 2023, he accompanied Ukrainian President Volodymyr Zelenskyy during his visit to Saudi Arabia and contributed to Zelenskyy's participation in the 2023 Arab League summit in Jeddah. He is one of the most active supporters of President Zelenskyy's "peace formula" on international forums and is expected to promote the Ukrainian "peace formula" in neutral countries of the Global South, especially in the Arab world, Africa and Asia. In August 2023, he attended an international summit in Saudi Arabia on the war in Ukraine.

=== Crimea ===
Umerov facilitated the 2017 release of two Russian political prisoners, Crimean Tatars Ahtem Chiygoz and İlmi Ümerov. In 2020, he established an interdepartmental coordination center focused on the release of Ukrainian political prisoners. In March 2020, Umerov initiated parliamentary hearings on the de-occupation and reintegration of Crimea and Sevastopol in March of that year to develop a strategic document on the return of the region to Ukraine.

Umerov communicates with Ukrainian authorities on exchanges of Crimean political prisoners and prisoners of war. In July 2020, he drafted a statement by the Verkhovna Rada on the illegitimacy of an all-Russian vote on amendments to the Constitution of the Russian Federation concerning Crimean territory. The statement was supported by 306 deputies. In September of that year, Umerov joined a group developing a state strategy for the de-occupation of Crimea and Sevastopol, supported by the parliamentary Human Rights Committee.

The Crimea Platform was established by the Verkhovna Rada in December 2020. Umerov was elected co-chair with Mustafa Dzhemilev, Ahtem Chiygoz, Yelyzaveta Yasko, and Vadym Halaichuk. Its purposes are to implement a parliamentary track for Crimea, and to create an inter-parliamentary assembly to advocate the restoration of control of portions of the Black and Azov Seas.

The United States, Canada, the United Kingdom, Turkey, Moldova, and Slovakia agreed to participate in the initiative, which is drafting about 20 bills about the peninsula's indigenous peoples, the status of Crimean Tatars, and Constitutional amendments concerning Crimea.

He drafted a parliamentary appeal to the UN and other bodies condemning the occupation of Crimea and Sevastopol, violations of human rights and freedoms, and calling for the release of Ukrainian political prisoners.

=== Social activity ===
Umerov has participated in student, public and charitable events, individually and as part of organizations, since 1999. He was a 2007 founder of the Crimean Tatars Fellowship, which focuses on the representation of Crimean Tatars in Ukraine and dialogue within the community in Kyiv and other Ukrainian cities. Umerov co-founded the international organization Bizim Qırım that year, which aimed to preserve national interests and promote the rights of the Crimean Tatars.

He was co-founder and president of the Crimean Development Fund from 2011 to 2013. Umerov became a co-founder and board member of the Crimean International Business Association in 2012. Among the association's goals were to develop the Crimean economy. Umerov's family funded the restoration of the 17th-century Orta Cami Mosque in Bakhchysarai to regain Crimea's cultural and historical heritage. The reconstructed mosque, which had been inactive for about 95 years, reopened on 16 August 2013.

In 2013, Umerov co-founded the ASTEM Foundation to improve public life via social innovation, regional communities, education, medicine, sports, culture, human rights, and religious freedom. It sponsored the Ukrainian Emerging Leaders program at Stanford University, which was designed to train Ukrainian leaders in skills to solve development problems. Umerov co-founded the Evkaf Foundation in 2014 to help develop Muslim communities. The Ukrainian Navy tugboat Yañı Qapu, damaged by the Russian military during the November 2018 Kerch Strait incident, was repaired in May 2020 with ASTEM Foundation support.

=== Crimean National Welfare Fund ===
Umerov is a co-founder and board member of the Crimean National Welfare Fund. Among the fund's projects is construction of a Crimean Tatar cultural and educational complex in Kyiv with Turkish support. The complex will be a public, cultural, social, educational, and spiritual center for Crimean Tatars and Ukrainian Muslims. A mosque and spiritual center, an ethnographic center with a national museum and conference hall, schools, restaurants, and a recreation area are planned.

=== Peace negotiations and alleged poisoning ===
Umerov was present at the March 2022 Russia–Ukraine peace negotiations after the Russian invasion of Ukraine. According to Meduza website, Umerov was accused by the Kremlin of spying for the US and deliberately prolonging negotiations to benefit Ukraine. It was reported on 28 March that Umerov, Russian billionaire Roman Abramovich, and another lawmaker developed symptoms consistent with poisoning after the event, including "red eyes, constant and painful tearing, and peeling skin on their hands and faces". The three negotiators flew to Istanbul to receive medical attention. Umerov later stated that he was "fine", and asked people not to trust "unverified information".

=== Minister of Defense ===
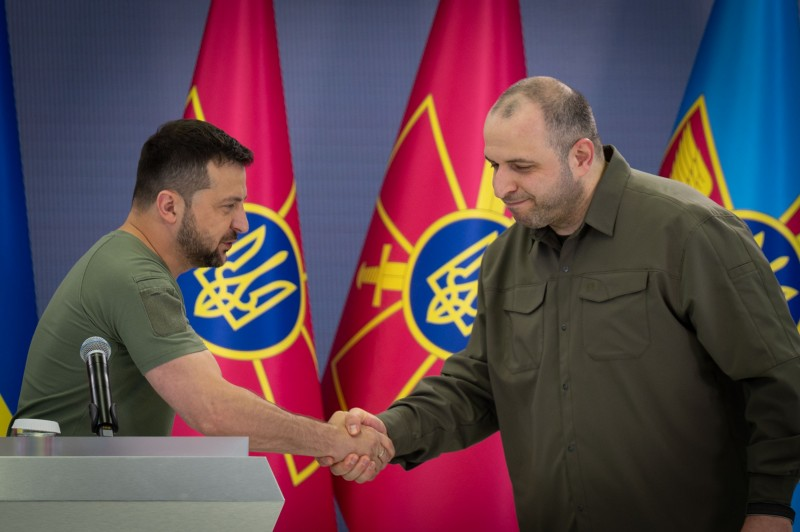
Umerov introduced as the minister of defense by President Zelenskyy (7 September 2023)

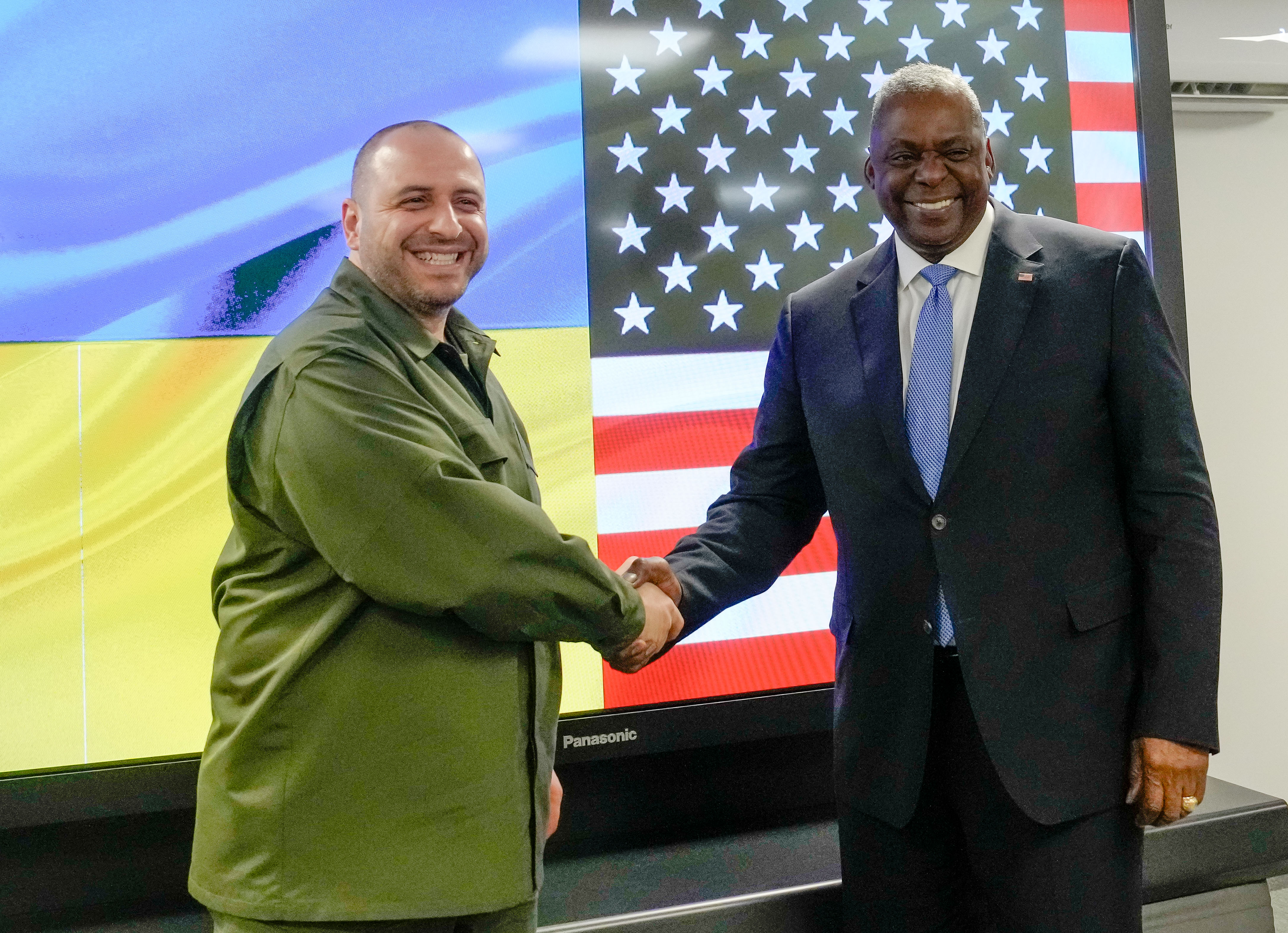
Umerov with U.S. Secretary of Defense Lloyd Austin in Kyiv, 20 November 2023

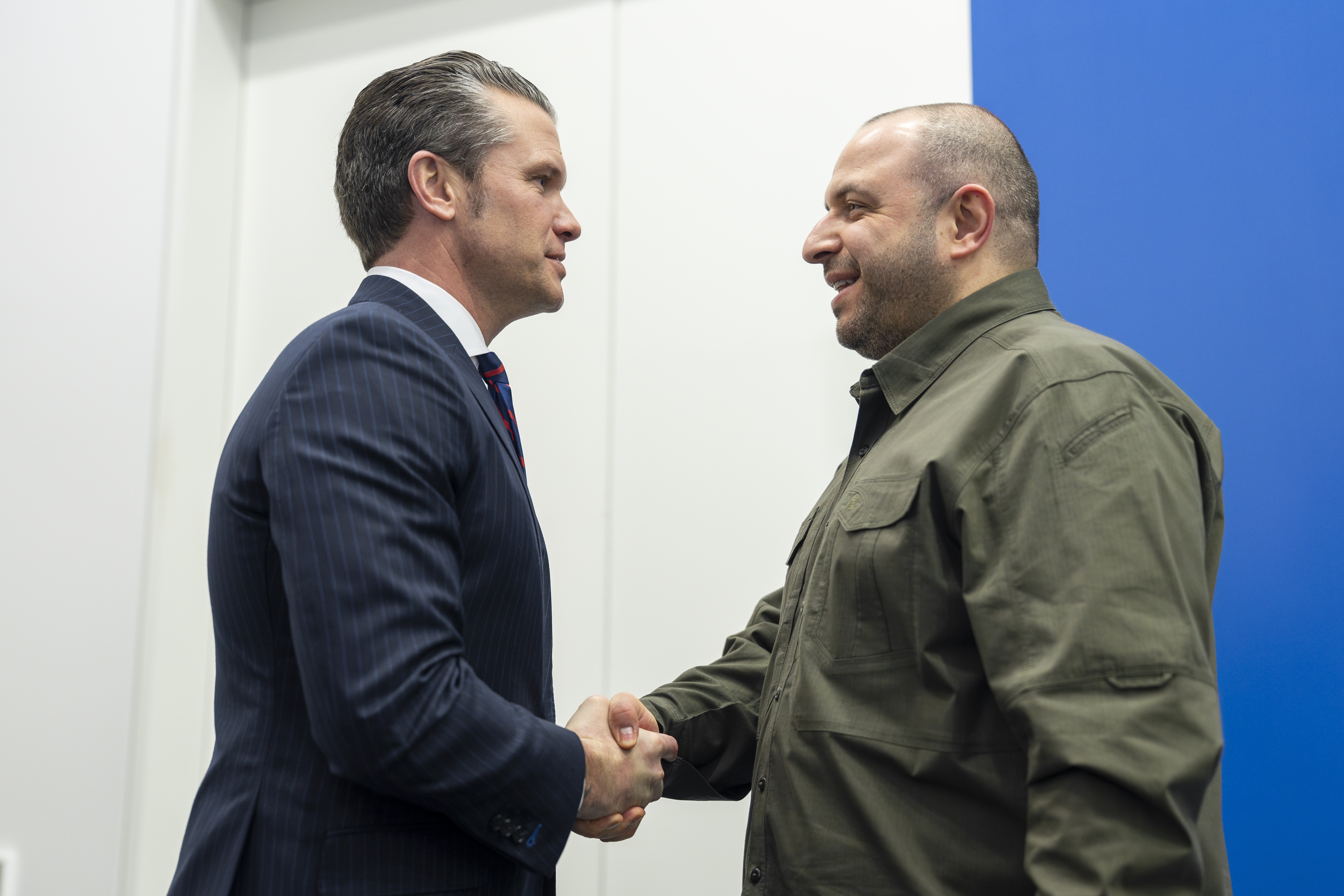
Umerov with U.S. Secretary of Defense Pete Hegseth at NATO headquarters in Brussels, 12 February 2025

On 3 September 2023, Ukrainian President Volodymyr Zelenskyy announced that he planned to replace incumbent minister of defense, Oleksii Reznikov with Umerov, as Reznikov would resign later that day. Umerov would be confirmed as the new Minister of Defense by the Verkhovna Rada on 6 September.

On 28 January 2025, the National Anti-Corruption Bureau of Ukraine launched a "pre-trial investigation" into Umerov over his dismissal of Marina Bezrukova as director of the Defense Procurement Agency (DPA) and his appointment of Arsen Zhumadilov to replace her, citing a complaint from the Anti-Corruption Action Center and the appointment being made despite the DPA's decision to extend Bezrukova's tenure.

=== National Security Council ===
On 18 July 2025, Zelenskyy appointed Umerov as secretary of the National Security and Defense Council as part of a government reshuffle.

=== Defence procurement corruption allegations ===
On 3 December 2024, Minister of Defence of Ukraine Rustem Umerov was summoned to the Verkhovna Rada in connection with controversies surrounding defence procurement, including the purchase of dysfunctional mortar rounds.

On 24 January 2025, Umerov declined to approve a decision of the Supervisory Board of the Defense Procurement Agency (DPA) to extend the contract of its director, Marina Bezrukova, for another year. He also dismissed two members of the Supervisory Board who had supported the extension: Taras Chmut, director of the Come Back Alive foundation, and former Deputy Minister of Defense Yuriy Dzhygyr.

On 25 January 2025, the Anti-Corruption Action Center submitted a statement to the National Anti-Corruption Bureau of Ukraine (NABU) alleging abuse of office by Umerov in connection with the DPA leadership dispute. On 27 January, NABU registered proceedings against Umerov on suspicion of abuse of power.

On 18 September 2025, the Anti-Corruption Action Center published a report stating that Umerov's family owned eight luxury properties in the US, but that he had only declared one of them. In a statement, the National Security and Defense Council of Ukraine pointed out that information about Umerov's family was sensitive due to his position. Umerov's office stated that the purchases made by Umerov's brothers and parents were independent of Umerov and that five of the properties were not used by Umerov's immediate family. The Anti-Corruption Action Center nevertheless called for further investigation.

In 2025-2026, Umerov was mentioned in media coverage of Operation Midas, a major corruption investigation conducted by the National Anti-Corruption Bureau of Ukraine (NABU). Published transcripts of recordings allegedly made in businessman Timur Mindich's apartment included conversations involving Umerov during his tenure as Minister of Defence. According to media reports, the conversations concerned defence procurement contracts, including drones and bulletproof vests, personnel appointments, and the activities of defence manufacturer Fire Point, prompting public discussion about alleged attempts by business interests to influence defence-sector decision-making. Following publication of the recordings, Transparency International Ukraine called for the removal from office of officials implicated in the case and for a full investigation into the allegations.

=== Head of the Foreign Intelligence Service ===
On 3 August 2026, he was appointed to lead the Foreign Intelligence Service of Ukraine. He was succeeded as Secretary of the National Security and Defence Council by Ihor Klymenko.

== Personal life ==
Umerov is a Muslim, and of Crimean Tatar origin. He is fluent in Ukrainian, Russian, English and Turkish. He also has elementary proficiency in Arabic and Crimean Tatar.

== Awards and honors ==
- Ukraine:
  - Order of Merit, 3rd class (23 August 2021)
