= Emine Dzhaparova =

Crimean Tatar politician and journalist

- Еміне Джапарова
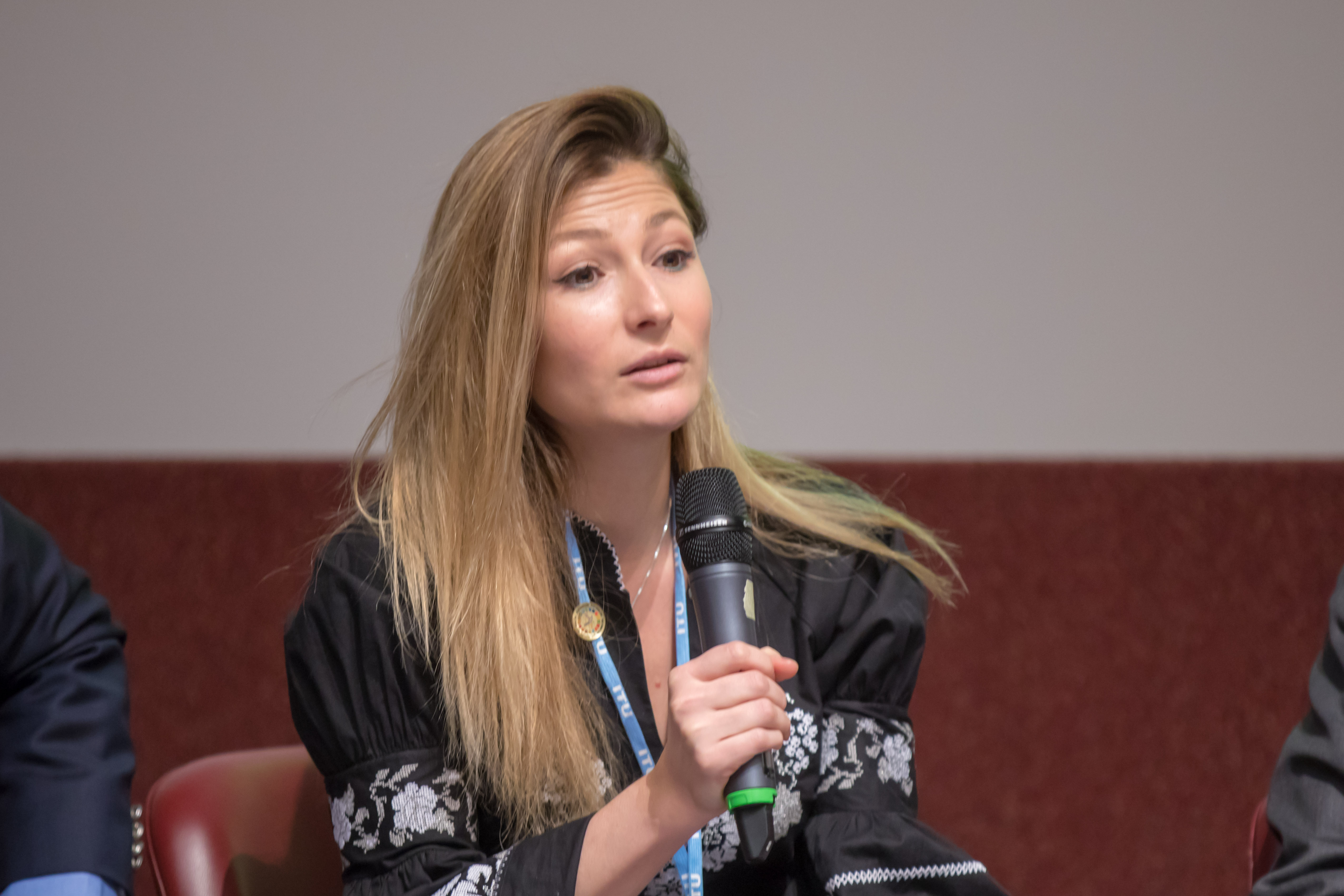

First Deputy Minister of Foreign Affairs
- In office 18 May 2020 – 12 April 2024
- President: Volodymyr Zelenskyy
- Minister: Dmytro Kuleba
- Succeeded by: Andrii Sybiha

Personal details
- Born: Emine Aiiarovna Dzhaparova; 5 May 1983 (age 43) Krasnodar, Russian SFSR, Soviet Union
- Citizenship: Ukrainian
- Awards: Order of Merit

Emine Aiiarovna Dzhaparova (or Dzheppar; Crimean Tatar: Emine Ayar qızı Ceppar, Ukrainian: Еміне Айяровна Джапарова; born 5 May 1983) is a Crimean Tatar-Ukrainian journalist, editor, television presenter, and politician. She was appointed the First Deputy Minister of Foreign Affairs of Ukraine (2020-2024)

== Early life ==
She was born on 5 May 1983, in Krasnodar.

She got her secondary education in Crimea, Ukrainian SSR, Soviet Union.

In 2000, she started studying at Educational and Scientific Institute of International Relations of Taras Shevchenko National University of Kyiv specializing in "International Relations". completed an internship at the US State Department and the Parliament of Ukraine. In 2006, she got diplomas of international political scientist and English translator.

In 2005, she participated in programs of United States Department of State International Visitor Leadership Program. In 2005, she took part in the "Youth Alternative" internship, which took place at the Secretariat First Deputy Speaker of the Verkhovna Rada of Ukraine.

In 2008, she graduated from the educational program for diplomats at the Klingendal Institute of International Relations, Netherlands.

== Political career ==
From 2002 to 2003, she worked as an assistant for national minorities in the office of First Deputy Prime Minister of Ukraine on humanitarian issues.

From March 2008 to January 2010, she worked as an Attaché of the Department of Cultural and Humanitarian Cooperation Ministry of Foreign Affairs (Ukraine);

From October 2015 to April 2016, she was an adviser to the Minister of Information Policy on issues of information policy regarding Crimea On April 20, 2016, she was appointed to the position of first deputy Minister of Information Policy of Ukraine. On September 3, 2019, she resigned from her position.

She was a candidate for Member of Parliament from the party "Ukrainian Strategy of Groysman" at the Parliamentary Elections 2019 under No. 4 in the ballot paper; since May 18, 2020, she has been the first deputy Minister of Foreign Affairs of Ukraine Dmytro Kuleba. She is also the head of the National Commission of Ukraine for UNESCO.

In the position of deputy minister, she is actively involved in the promotion of the international coordination mechanism for the de-occupation of Crimea Crimea Platform.

== Journalistic career ==
Since 2011, she has started working as a journalist. From 2011 to 2014, she worked as a host and program author on the Crimean Tatar TV channel ATR: "Zaman" news, "Sherfe fashion" fashion show and the "PROkino" program.

In 2014, she worked as a video editor, assistant to the editor-in-chief of the website Crimea.Reality.

In February 2014, she started working as a journalist at Radio Liberty.

== Civic position ==
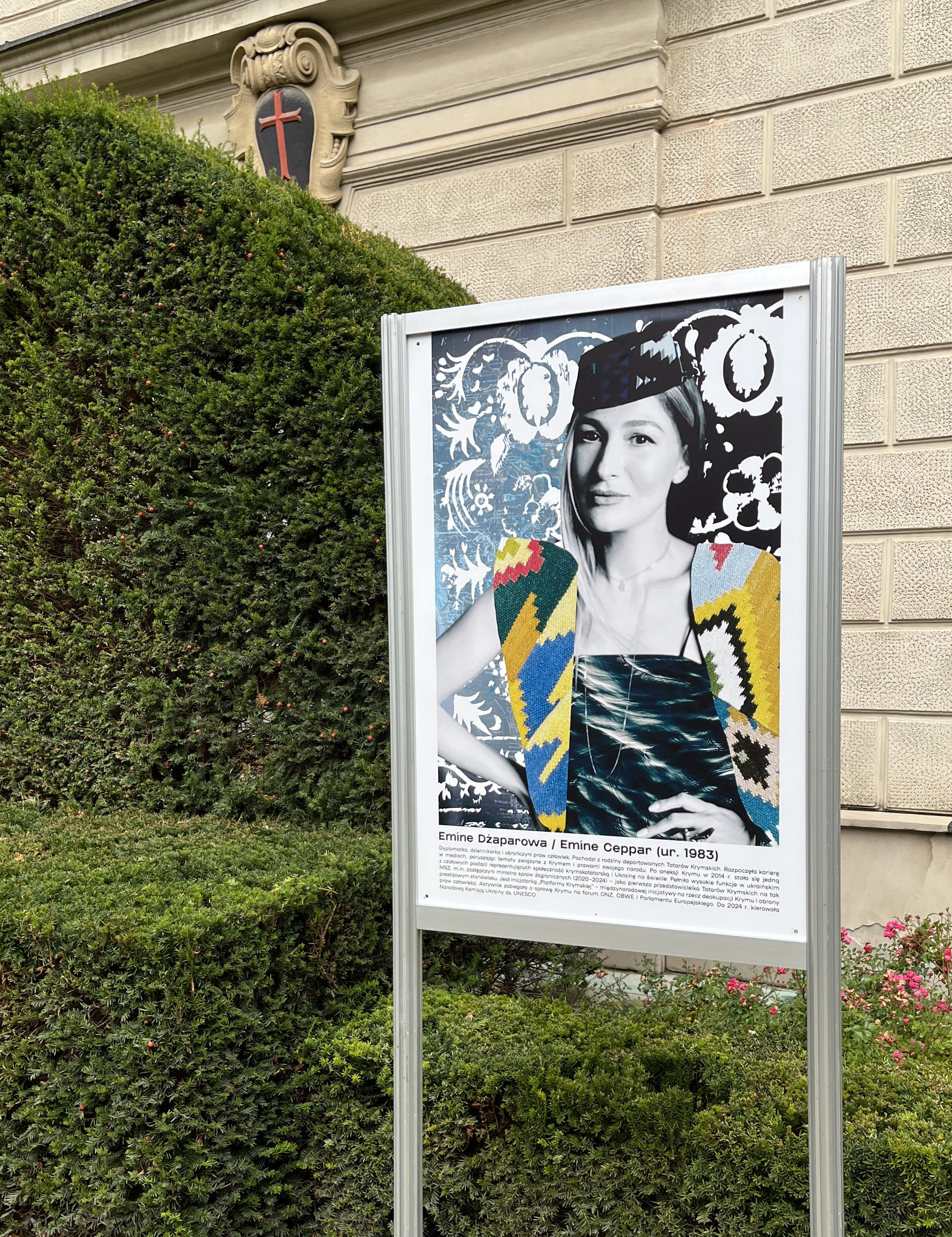
The stand dedicated to Emine Dzhaparova at the exhibition «She is Crimea, She is World» by the Krymski Dom Foundation in Wrocław (Poland), October 2025

In October 2017, journalists from the TV channel "Rain" asked Emine for a comment on the dismissal of the deputies of the Mejlis of the Crimean Tatar people, Ilmi Umerov and Akhtem Chiygoz. Dzhaparova started speaking in Ukrainian, after which host Anna Mongait interrupted her, explaining that there was no interpreter on the air and asked to switch to Russian. Dzhaparova continued speaking in Ukrainian.

"I'm sorry, but I'm an official person, so I have to speak Ukrainian. This is my conscious choice. Please understand my language"

— , she told to the journalist.

== Private life ==
Emine has two daughters - Iman and Alem-Sultan.

== Awards and honors ==
- Order of Merit III grade (22 December 2021) — For a significant personal contribution to the strengthening of international cooperation of Ukraine, many years of productive diplomatic activity and high professionalism
