= Ümerov =

Ümerov (feminine: Ümerova) or Umierov (feminine: Umierova) is a Crimean Tatar surname. People with that surname include:

- Gayane Umerova (born 1985), Uzbek art critic and curator
- İlmi Ümerov (born 1957), Ukrainian politician of Crimean Tatar origin
- Rustem Umierov (born 1982), Ukrainian politician of Crimean Tatar origin
