= Oleksii Reznikov =

Ukrainian lawyer and politician (born 1966)

- Олексій Резніков
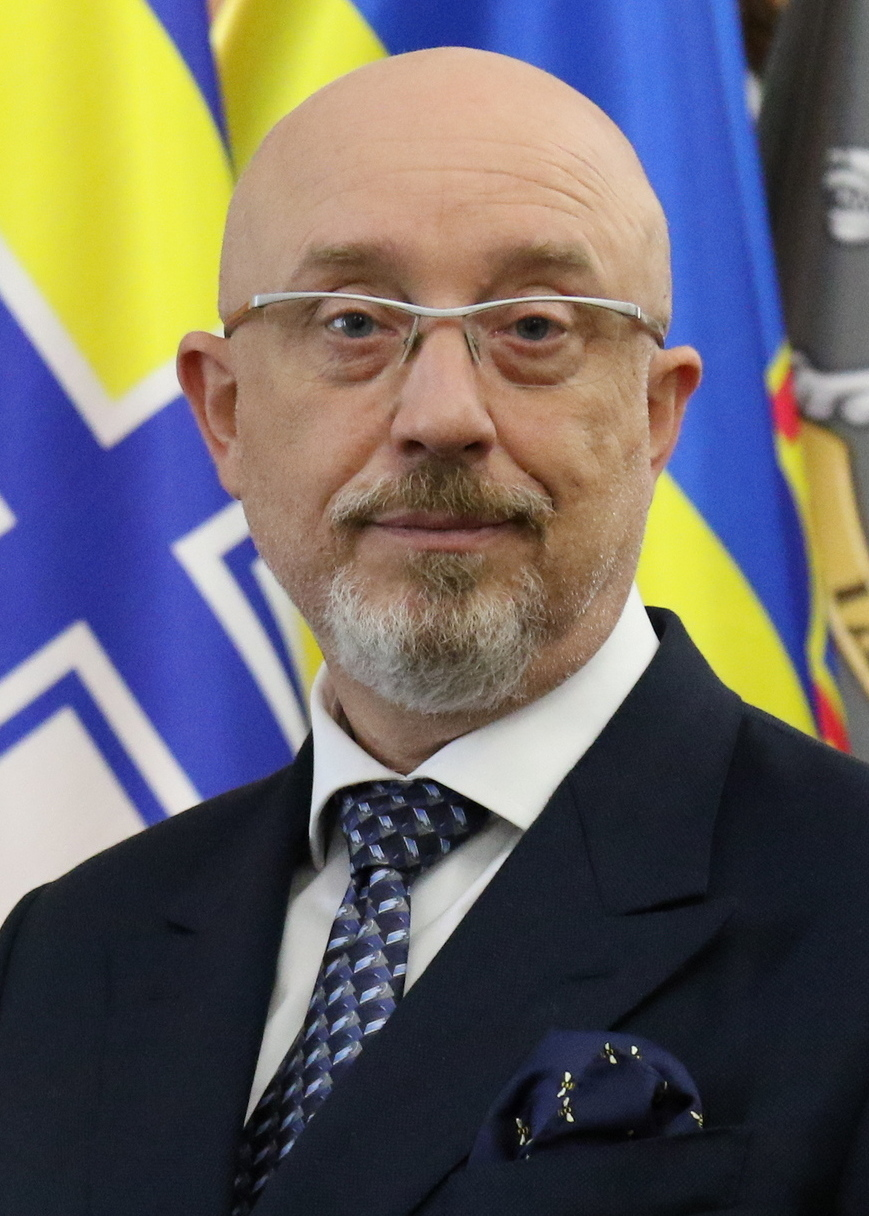
- Official portrait, 2021

17th Minister of Defence
- In office 4 November 2021 – 5 September 2023
- President: Volodymyr Zelenskyy
- Prime Minister: Denys Shmyhal
- Preceded by: Andriy Taran
- Succeeded by: Rustem Umerov

Deputy Prime Minister of Ukraine Minister of Reintegration of Temporarily Occupied Territories
- In office 4 March 2020 – 3 November 2021
- President: Volodymyr Zelenskyy
- Prime Minister: Denys Shmyhal
- Preceded by: Oksana Koliada
- Succeeded by: Iryna Vereshchuk

Personal details
- Born: 18 June 1966 (age 60) Lviv, Ukrainian SSR, Soviet Union
- Party: Independent
- Other political affiliations: European Solidarity
- Education: University of Lviv

Military service
- Allegiance: Soviet Union
- Branch/service: Soviet Air Forces
- Years of service: 1984–1986
- Rank: Sergeant

Oleksii Yuriiovych Reznikov (Ukrainian: Олексій Юрійович Резніков, IPA: [olekˈs⁽ʲ⁾ij ˈjur⁽ʲ⁾ijowɪtʃ ˈrɛz⁽ʲ⁾n⁽ʲ⁾ikou̯]; born 18 June 1966) is a Ukrainian lawyer and politician who served as the Minister of Defence of Ukraine from 4 November 2021 until his dismissal on 5 September 2023. Reznikov previously has served in several other positions in the government of Ukraine: Deputy Prime Minister, Minister for Reintegration of the Temporarily Occupied Territories of Ukraine, deputy head of the Kyiv City State Administration from 2016 to 2018, and deputy mayor-secretary of the Kyiv City Council from June 2014 to December 2015.

Following his departure from politics, Reznikov focuses on academic and teaching work and as a business negotiator.

== Early life and education ==
Reznikov was born on 18 June 1966 in Lviv, which was then part of the Ukrainian Soviet Socialist Republic in the Soviet Union. His father, Yurii Reznikov was a professor, Master of Sports in Acrobatics, Provost of the Lviv State Institute of Physical Culture. His mother, Olena Reznikova, was a neurologist at Lviv neuropsychiatric clinic, Master of Sports in Rhythmic Gymnastics.

From 1984 to 1986, Reznikov served in the Soviet Air Forces, serving with the 806th Bombardment Aviation Regiment at Lutsk and Military Unit 87358 at Novohrad-Volynskyi.

Reznikov attended Lviv University, receiving a master's degree with honours in Law in 1991. During his university years, Reznikov actively participated in student life: he won the Law Student Olympics across the Ukrainian SSR in the individual and team competitions and represented Ukraine at the Law Student Olympics across the Soviet Union.

In addition to Ukrainian, Reznikov is fluent in Russian, English, and Polish.

== Professional career ==
Reznikov received a lawyer's certificate in 1994. Obtained attorney licence No. 263 in 1994.

Reznikov's professional career began during his last year of university, when he co-founded the brokerage company Galicia Securities. Between 1999 and 2002, he served as the Deputy Head of the Ukrainian Legislation Centre in Kyiv. He also established Pravis law firm (later Reznikov, Vlasenko and Partners), which, in 2006, merged with the law firm Magister and Partners to become Magisters.

In 2009 and 2010, Magisters won the Chambers Europe Award. In 2010, British magazine The Lawyer named Magisters the best law firm in Russia and the CIS.

In 2010 Reznikov founded the Oleksii Reznikov Scholarship for talented law students and postgraduate legal scholars in Ukraine.

In 2011, Magisters was subject of a friendly takeover by Egorov, Puginsky, Afanasiev and Partners, an international group with offices in London, Moscow, Saint Petersburg, Kyiv, Minsk and Washington, D.C. Until 3 July 2014, Reznikov headed the Department for Disputes and served as General Counsel of Egorov, Puginsky, Afanasiev and Partners.

During his law practice, Reznikov defended then-presidential candidate Viktor Yushchenko before the Supreme Court of Ukraine, and the third round of the 2004 Ukrainian presidential election was annulled.

Reznikov represented B. Fuksman and O. Rodnyanskiy in their case against the "Studio 1 + 1" in the company of Central European Media Enterprises, pertaining to their share of the ownership. He represented "Investment-Metallurgical Union" Consortium defending the legality of privatisation of the "Krivorozhstal"; defended PFC "Dnieper" on privatisation of the "Nikopol Ferroalloy Plant". Reznikov also represented several other people, including Savik Shuster, Vladimir Gusinsky, OJSC "ArcelorMittal Kryvyi Rih" company "Quasar" Sadogan Petroleum, DCH, FC Metalist Kharkiv (on charges of violating the principles of fair play), IA "IMC" Corporation " Interpipe ". He gained extensive experience in representing clients in the Supreme Economic Court of Ukraine, the Supreme Administrative Court of Ukraine, the Supreme Court of Ukraine, and in the Court of Arbitration for Sport in Lausanne.

On 20 June 2014, Reznikov's advocacy licence (originally issued on 10 March 1994) was suspended, due to his appointment as the Secretary of the Kyiv City Council.

In November 2018, Reznikov renewed his legal practice as a partner at the Asters Law Firm. Oleksii focuses on alternative dispute resolution including: expert determination, negotiation, facilitation, conciliation, mediation, fact-finding, early neutral evaluation, settlement conference and settlement agreements.

Reznikov stopped his right to practice law in March 2020. The National Bar Association of Ukraine renewed Reznikov's right to practice law on 16 January 2024 "on the basis of his application."

In the summer of 2024, Oleksii Reznikov joined the GLOBSEC team as a Distinguished Fellow. GLOBSEC is a non-partisan non-governmental organisation based in Bratislava, Slovakia. One of its main activities is the annual GLOBSEC Bratislava Global Security Forum, in existence since 2005.

== Political career ==
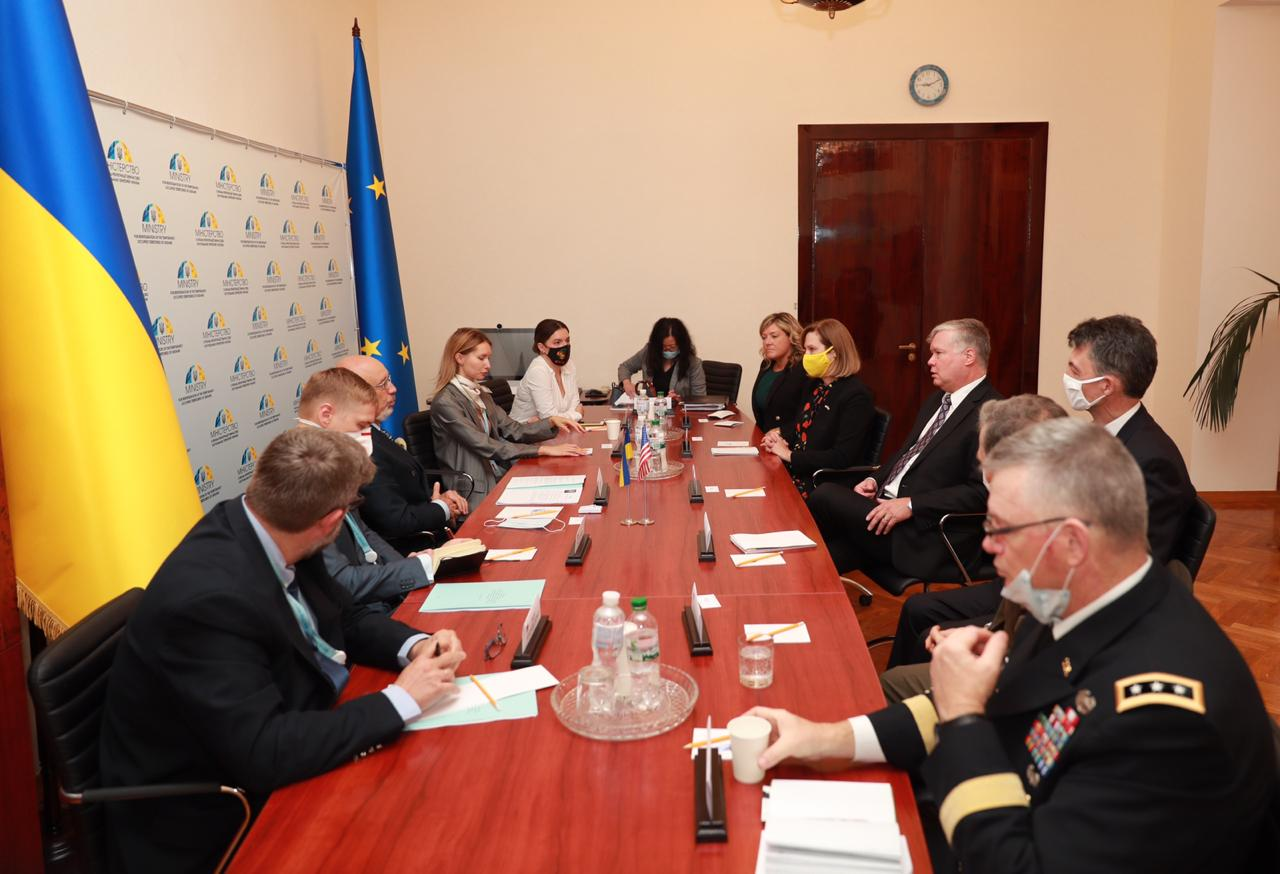
Reznikov meets with US Deputy Secretary of State Stephen Biegun in Kyiv on 26 August 2020

In the 2014 Kyiv local election, Reznikov was elected to Kyiv City Council's 7th convocation as a member of Solidarity. Reznikov served as chairman of the Kyiv City Council Commission for the Restitution of the Rights of the Rehabilitated. On 19 June 2014, Reznikov was appointed Deputy Mayor – Secretary of the Kyiv City Council.

Reznikov has served in multiple positions, including as head of Ukraine's National delegation in Congress of Local and Regional Authorities of the Council of Europe from 2015 to 2016. Afterwards, he turned to activism, serving as Deputy Chairman of the Mayor Anti-Corruption Council, as a board member of the "Let's Do it Together" social project. At the same time, he also remained in government becoming a member of the Reformation Team for the Decentralisation, Local Government and Regional Policy of the Ministry of Communities and Territories Development.

From April 2016 to September 2018, Oleksii Reznikov served as Deputy Head of the Kyiv City State Administration (KCSA) for the implementation of self-government powers. His responsibilities included overseeing the implementation of state policy in areas such as local self-government development, domestic policy, international relations, tourism, advertising, cultural heritage protection, education, culture, social welfare, youth, and sports. He was also responsible for leading reforms in decentralisation, local governance, and other aspects of urban life in Kyiv.

Reznikov launched the reform of outdoor advertising in Kyiv. The core principles of this reform were a safe, accessible, and comfortable city.

On 18 September 2019, President Volodymyr Zelenskyy authorised Reznikov to represent Ukraine in the working political subgroup at the Trilateral Contact Group on a Donbas settlement. On 5 May 2020 President Volodymyr Zelenskyy authorised Reznikov to First Deputy Head of the Ukrainian delegation at the Trilateral Contact Group.

On 4 March 2020, Reznikov was appointed Deputy Prime Minister, Minister for Reintegration of the Temporarily Occupied Territories of Ukraine in the Shmyhal Government.

On 12 February 2021, Deputy Prime Minister Oleksii Reznikov proposed the launch of a special economic regime in Donbas aimed at encouraging investment through tax and customs incentives, access to budgetary and donor funding, and international arbitration mechanisms.

On 1 July, at Reznikov's initiative, the Verkhovna Rada of Ukraine adopted the Law of Ukraine "On the Indigenous Peoples of Ukraine" (No. 1616-IX), which granted legal status to the Crimean Tatars, Karaites, and Krymchaks as indigenous peoples of Ukraine.

In March 2022, while serving as Ukraine's Minister of Defense, Oleksii Reznikov took part in negotiations with the Russian delegation, which were initially held in Belarus and later in Turkey.

He initiated the development of a new Charter of the Territorial Community of Kyiv, in which he introduced the concept of "public space."

Oleksii Reznikov is one of the initiators and co-authors of draft law No. 8202, "On Amendments to Certain Laws of Ukraine to Improve the System of Cultural Heritage Protection," which strengthens administrative and criminal liability for the destruction of cultural heritage sites and aims to preserve the historical legacy of Kyiv and Ukraine.

He is also one of the authors of draft law No. 8420 "On the Capital of Ukraine – the City of Kyiv," which aims to regulate the activities of local self-government bodies and depoliticise their work. Among other provisions, the law proposes reducing the number of Kyiv City Council deputies from 120 to 25.

=== Defence Minister ===
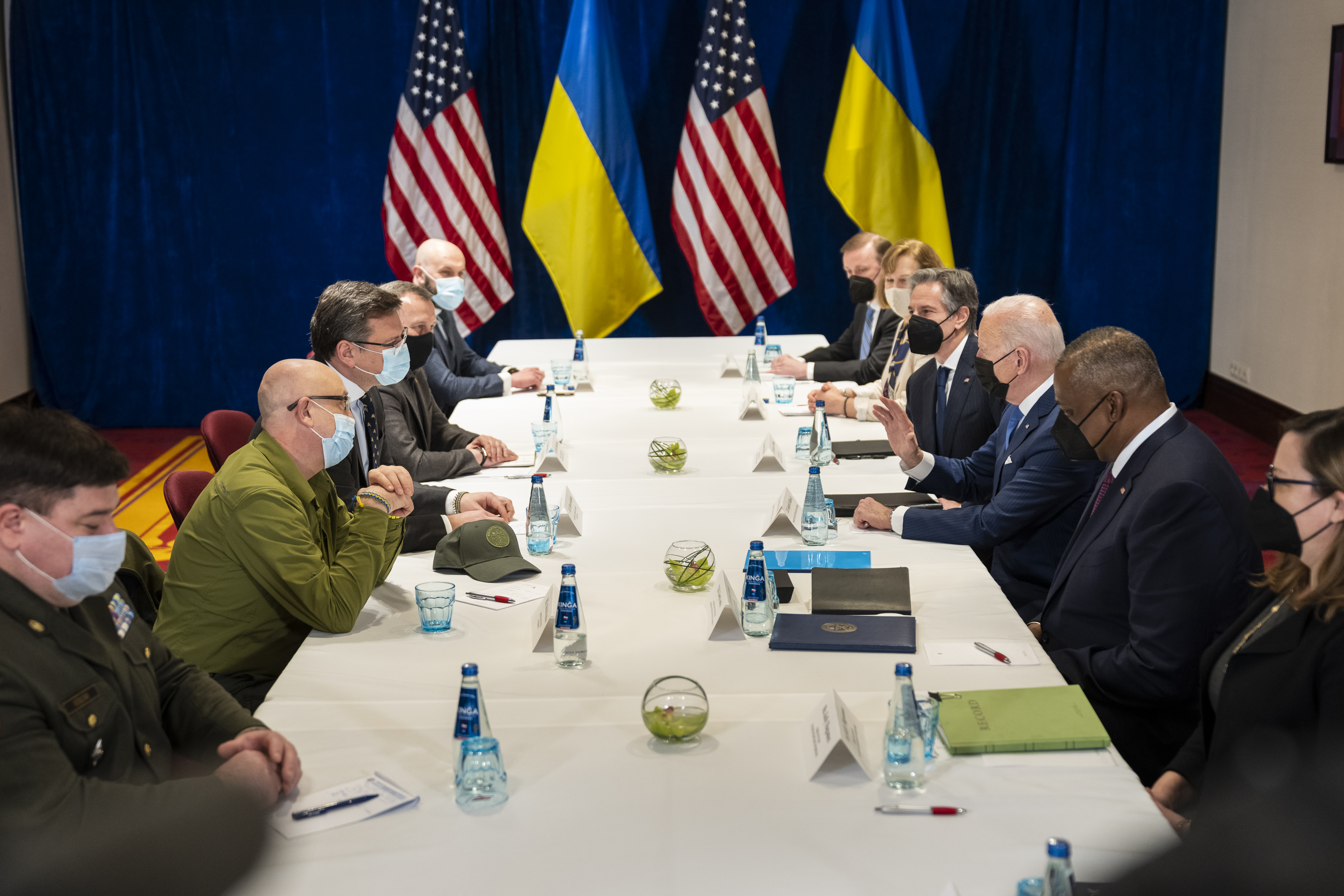
Reznikov, US President Joe Biden and US Secretary of Defense Lloyd Austin in Warsaw, Poland on 26 March 2022

On 1 November 2021, Reznikov submitted his letter of resignation from the Deputy Prime Minister, Minister for Reintegration of the Temporarily Occupied Territories of Ukraine role. This resignation request was registered by the Verkhovna Rada on 1 November 2021. On 3 November 2021 the Verkhovna Rada dismissed him as Minister for Reintegration of the Temporarily Occupied Territories of Ukraine, and subsequently appointed him Minister of Defence. Reznikov was appointed as Ukraine's Minister of Defence 7 years after Russia unilaterally annexed (the Ukrainian province) Crimea and 7 years after the start of the War in Donbas in Eastern Ukraine.

In December 2021 Reznikov stated that Germany had vetoed Ukraine's purchase of anti-drone rifles and anti-sniper systems via the NATO Support and Procurement Agency.

In 2022–2023, Ukraine's Minister of Defense Oleksii Reznikov initiated a series of systemic reforms in the fields of defence, digitalisation, and logistics. Among the key achievements were the launch of the electronic registry of conscripts and reservists "Oberih", the establishment of the Defense Procurement Agency based on NATO standards, the implementation of the real-time battlefield coordination system DELTA, the expansion of the SAP and LOGFAS logistics platforms, and the creation of the State Rear Operator (DOT) to centralise non-combat support for the Armed Forces of Ukraine.

During Reznikov's tenure, the Ministry of Defense also established an Anti-Corruption Council, introduced the digital logistics platform DOT-Chain, and dismantled monopolies in the military food supply sector.

Reznikov reformed the procedures for the adoption of new military equipment, reducing the approval time from several years to just a few weeks. He also initiated the development of female military uniforms and body armour, updated logistics policies to reflect the needs of women, and launched a reform of military education aligned with NATO standards.

In March 2022 Reznikov launched the electronic registry "Oberih" — a unified, centralised, automated information and telecommunications system for managing the data of conscripts, military personnel, and reservists. The formal launch of the system was enacted by Ministry of Defense Order No. 94 dated 28 March 2022.

In June 2022, at Reznikov's initiative, the State Institution "Defense Procurement Agency of Ukraine" was established with the goal of introducing a transparent and efficient defence procurement system in line with NATO standards.

In September 2022, Oleksii Reznikov initiated the simplification of the procedure for adopting new types of weapons and military equipment into service with the Armed Forces of Ukraine. On 30 September 2022, the Cabinet of Ministers approved Resolution No. 1097, which amended the regulations governing the supply of weapons, military and special equipment, and ammunition during martial law. As a result, the process of adopting new models – including codification, operational clearance, and integration into unit structures – was significantly accelerated.

At Reznikov's initiative, systemic changes were also launched to address the needs of women in the Armed Forces of Ukraine. In December 2022, the Ministry of Defense presented the first samples of field uniforms and body armour adapted to the anatomical features of women. In 2023, the procurement of female-specific gear was officially incorporated into the ministry's logistics policy.

On 30 December, upon the submission of Minister Reznikov, the Cabinet of Ministers of Ukraine approved an updated Concept for Reforming the Military Education System. The document envisions a phased transition to a multi-level professional training system for service members in accordance with NATO principles and standards.

In January 2023, following a series of critical reports about inflated food prices, the Ministry of Defense under Reznikov's leadership announced a reform of the food supply system for the Armed Forces of Ukraine. The key change involved a shift to a model where food is procured as a service rather than as individual products.

On 4 February 2023, upon the proposal of Minister of Defense Oleksii Reznikov, the Cabinet of Ministers approved the implementation of the Delta system – an integrated C4ISR platform that combines real-time data from drones, satellites, and intelligence sources to coordinate combat units within Ukraine's Defense Forces.

In April, Oleksii Reznikov initiated a transparency reform within the Ministry of Defense by launching the creation of the Public Anti-Corruption Council and the Reform Support Office to enhance public oversight and strengthen coordination with the General Staff. Following a competitive selection process, Reznikov signed an order on 28 April 2023, approving the composition of the council, reaffirming the ministry's commitment to independent oversight of defence procurement and decision-making.

In 2023, Reznikov, together with the Commander-in-Chief of the Armed Forces of Ukraine, approved the implementation of SAP software for automating logistics and defence resource management.

On 1 December 2023, the Ministry of Defense of Ukraine officially launched the State Rear Operator (DOT) — a specialised agency created at Reznikov's initiative to centralise the procurement of food, fuel, clothing, and other non-combat supplies for the Armed Forces of Ukraine.

In 2022–2023, under Reznikov's leadership, the implementation of the LOGFAS (Logistics Functional Area Services) system – NATO's digital solution for managing resources, transportation, and supply – was significantly scaled up.

As Ukraine's Minister of Defense, Oleksii Reznikov played a key role in the creation and development of the international "Ramstein" platform – the Ukraine Defense Contact Group. Beginning in April 2022, he participated in each of the first 13 meetings.

Between 2022 and 2023, Reznikov initiated the creation of key capability coalitions within the Ramstein format: the Tank Coalition, F‑16 Fighter Jet Coalition ("Ocean’s 11"), Naval Coalition, IT Coalition, and Demining Coalition. These coalitions became platforms for systematic equipment transfers, training of Ukrainian troops and technical personnel, the establishment of repair hubs, and the development of the defence sector's digital infrastructure.

Oleksii Reznikov consistently lobbied for strengthening Ukraine's air defence, the supply of heavy weaponry (including HIMARS, M270, NASAMS, Leopard, Abrams, and Harpoon systems), artillery, ammunition, and the implementation of NATO-standard training programs.

In addition to participating in the Ramstein-format meetings, Reznikov actively represented Ukraine at international forums such as GLOBSEC, CEPA Forum, Shangri-La Dialogue, and at donor conferences held in Copenhagen, Paris, Brussels, Bucharest, Athens, Madrid, Stockholm, and Vilnius. He held bilateral talks with the defence ministers of the United States, France, Germany, United Kingdom, Spain, Denmark, Greece, Romania, Australia, Singapore, and other nations, securing faster delivery of military assistance to Ukraine.

==== 2022 Russian invasion of Ukraine ====
On 26 February 2022, two days after Russia's full-scale invasion of Ukraine, Reznikov held a call with his Belarusian counterpart Viktor Khrenin, who on behalf of Russia's minister of defence Sergei Shoigu offered to stop the invasion if Ukraine capitulated. Reznikov replied that he is "ready to accept the capitulation from the Russian side."

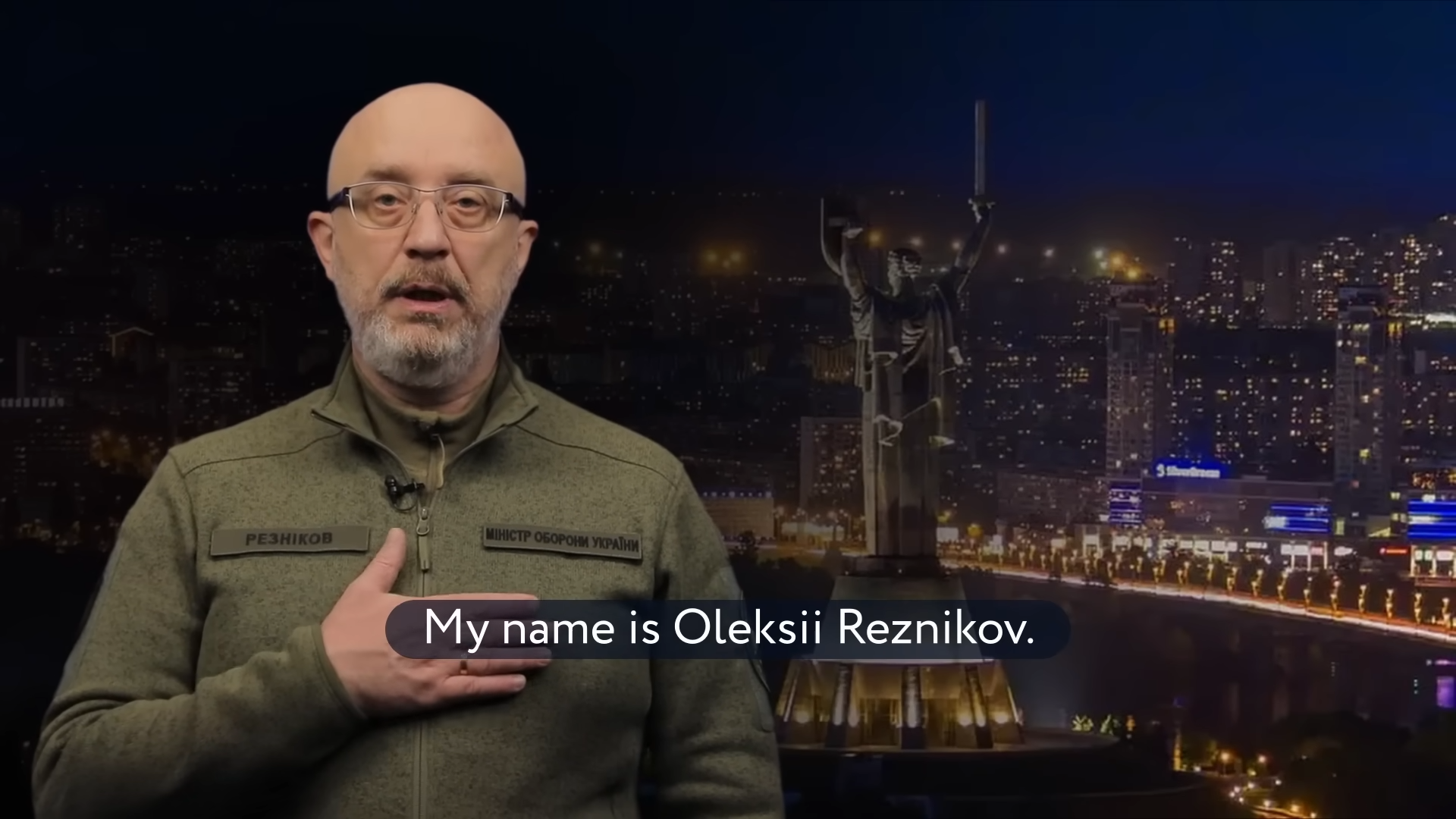
On 30 December 2022, Reznikov announced a second wave of Russian mobilisation, which was supposed to begin on 5 January 2023

In December 2022, Reznikov predicted that a new wave of Russian mobilisation would begin on 5 January 2023, but this didn't happen.

In February 2023, the head of the Servant of the People parliamentary bloc, Davyd Arakhamia, stated that Reznikov would be replaced by Kyrylo Budanov as defence minister. This change did not take place, however. On 5 March 2023, Reznikov stated that the Russians were losing around 500 men killed and wounded in action every day fighting for Bakhmut, saying that Russian soldiers were just "cannon fodder" in the Kremlin's "meat grinder tactics".

In May 2023, he urged ethnic Bashkirs from the Russian republic of Bashkortostan not to participate in the war against Ukraine, saying that "thousands of Bashkir men have died or became disabled" because of Putin's imperial ambitions. He said that when he served in the Soviet Air Forces, a Bashkir was one of his closest friends.

In June 2023, he said that Ukraine was willing to accept China as a mediator for peace talks between Russia and Ukraine only if Beijing could convince Russia to withdraw from all the territories it had occupied. According to Reznikov, it seems that China could influence Russia. Reznikov said that the peace plans presented by China, Brazil or Indonesia are attempts at mediation on behalf of Russia, saying that "they all currently want to be mediators on Russia’s side. That’s why this sort of mediation currently doesn’t fit for us at all because they aren’t impartial".

On 6 July 2023, US President Joe Biden authorised the provision of cluster munitions to Ukraine in support of a Ukrainian counter-offensive against Russian forces in Russian-occupied southeastern Ukraine. Reznikov welcomed the decision and said that "As we got in May 2022 155-millimeter artillery systems, it became a game changer. In July, we got different types of [Multiple Launch Rocket Systems] it became [the] next game changer … And I hope that cluster munitions [become] a next game changer as weaponry or ammunition for liberation of our temporarily occupied territories."

==== Resignation ====
For the first time, information about Reznikov's resignation appeared after several high-ranking officials, including deputy defence ministers, were fired in Ukraine in early 2023 due to corruption scandals. Over the next few months, it became known about a number of scandals involving the purchase of products (well known as "Eggs for 17 hryvnias") and ammunition for the military by the Ministry of Defense of Ukraine at inflated prices, and Reznikov's resignation was again talked about. According to a source of The New York Times in the Office of the President of Ukraine, the reshuffle in the leadership of the Ukrainian department occurred for three reasons: the Ukrainian authorities believe that a new military leadership is needed due to the protracted war, Reznikov is criticised by civil society and the media against the background of corruption scandals, in addition, he himself expressed a desire to resign.

On 3 April 2025, Oleksandr Abakumov, head of the First Chief Division of Detectives at the National Anti-Corruption Bureau of Ukraine (NABU), stated live on Radio Svoboda that "Reznikov is neither a suspect nor a witness in the case regarding military procurement."

In December 2023 BBC Verify, in collaboration with the Atlantic Council's Digital Forensic Research Lab (DFRLab), released findings of an investigation uncovering a large-scale disinformation campaign aimed at discrediting Ukraine's Minister of Defense, Oleksii Reznikov. According to their report, over 12,800 fake TikTok accounts spread false allegations of corruption and abuse involving the minister, including fabricated claims that his daughter had purchased a mansion in Madrid. These accounts collectively amassed over 847,000 followers and likely generated hundreds of millions of views. TikTok confirmed that the accounts were linked to a Russian source and removed them for violating the platform's policies. The campaign coincided with increased political pressure on Reznikov, and his resignation in September 2023; President Volodymyr Zelenskyy replaced him with Rustem Umerov. Zelenskyy stated he sacked Reznikov because "I believe that the ministry needs new approaches and other formats of interaction with both the military and society as a whole." However, his dismissal during a wider anti-corruption crackdown within the country has cast the official reason in doubt. In response, Reznikov submitted his formal resignation to parliament. On 4 September, the relevant committee of the Verkhovna Rada endorsed his resignation, and on 5 September, parliament voted to approve his dismissal with 327 votes in favour.

== Personal life ==
Reznikov was the director of the amateur short films "People-quad" and "People-ATV: Elusive Again."

In 2009, he took part in the Silk Way Rally in the Dakar Series as a co-pilot and navigator. The rally took place on the territory of three countries (Russia, Kazakhstan, and Turkmenistan) and Karakum Desert.

- Two-time silver medallist of the Ukraine trophy-raid (2011–2012);
- Champion of the Ukraine trophy-raid (2013);
- Master of Sport of Ukraine in Motorsport.

Reznikov is of Jewish heritage. In 2020, he married television presenter Yulia Yaroslavivna Zoriy.

He has two children and two grandchildren.

In the past, Reznikov wrote short stories, personal essays, and sketches from everyday life as a form of creative expression.

== Academic work ==
After completing his term as Ukraine's Minister of Defense, Oleksii Reznikov focused on education and academic work.

He is a senior lecturer at the State University "Kyiv Aviation Institute," where, at the Institute of Leadership and Human Capital, he teaches his original course "The Art of Negotiation: Unlocking the Secrets."

Reznikov regularly teaches at the Yevhen Berezniak Military Academy, serves as a guest lecturer at the National Academy of the Security Service of Ukraine in Kyiv, and at leading educational institutions around the world.

Нe has delivered lectures at institutions such as American University (Washington), the University of California at Berkeley, Stanford University, the Belfer Center at Harvard Kennedy School, the Ukrainian Research Institute at Harvard University, the Center for International Studies at the Massachusetts Institute of Technology, the University of Copenhagen (Denmark), Istanbul University (Turkey), and the University of Tokyo (Japan).

== Honours and awards ==
- In 2019, at a reception dedicated to Independence Day, the Ambassador of the Republic of Poland to Ukraine Bartosz Jan Cichocki presented Oleksii Reznikov with a state award – the Silver Cross of Merit.
- In 2022, the Minister of Defence of Denmark Morten Bødskov presented Oleksii Reznikov with an award "For outstanding leadership during wartime" – the Medal of the Minister of Defence.
- Order of the Cross of Vytis (Lithuania) and Medal of Merit (Lithuania)
