= Ilmi Umierov =

Ukrainian Crimean Tatar politician

- İlmi Ümerov (Crimean Tatar); Ільмі Умеров (Ukrainian)
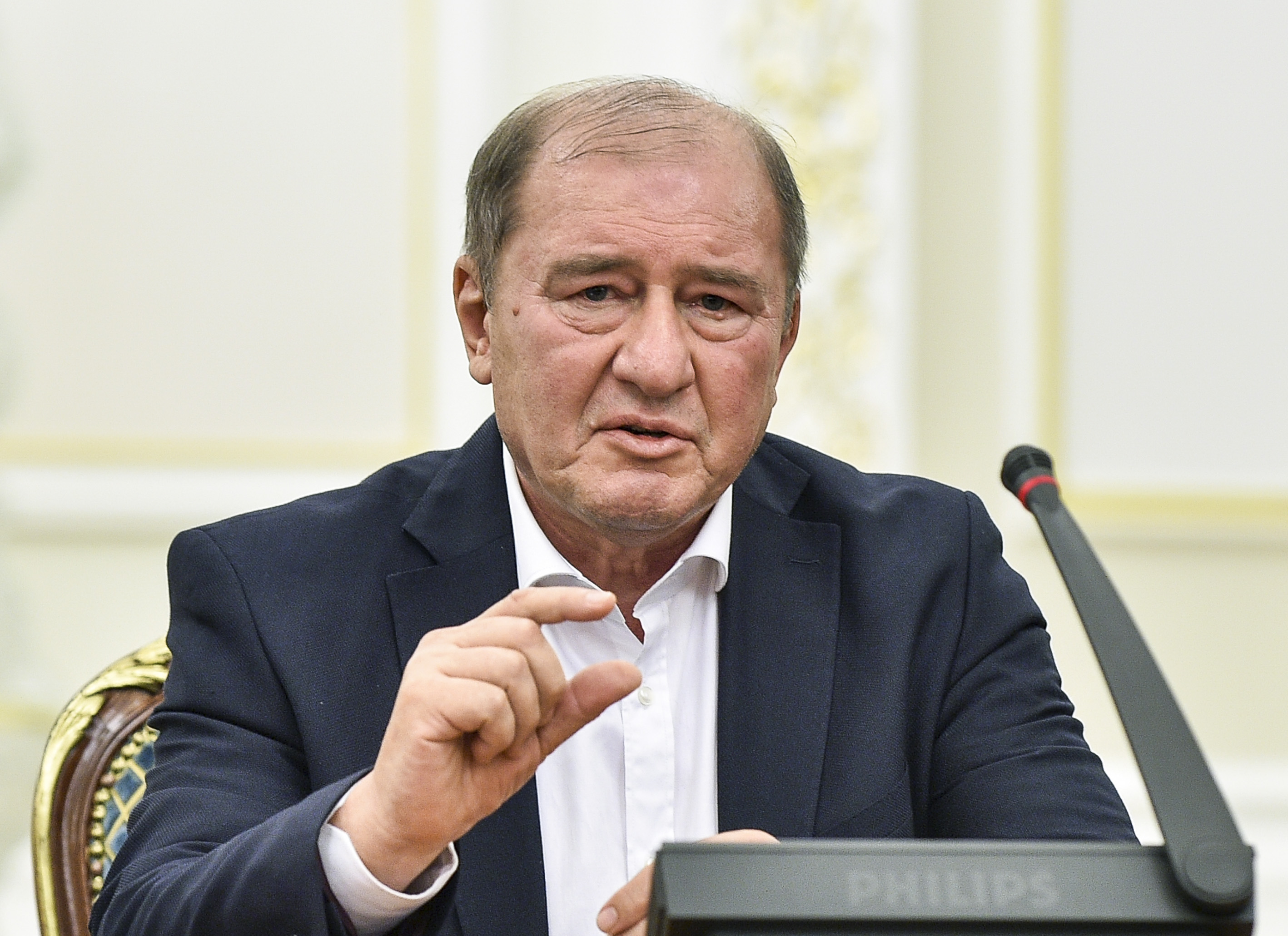
- Ümerov in 2017

Deputy Chairman of the Mejlis of the Crimean Tatar People
- Incumbent
- Assumed office 21 March 2015 Serving with Nariman Celâl, Ahtem Chiygoz, and Aslan Ömer Qırımlı
- Leader: Refat Chubarov

Chairman of the Bakhchysarai Regional Mejlis
- In office 1998–2002
- Succeeded by: Ahtem Chiygoz
- In office 1991–1994
- Preceded by: Position established

Deputy Chairman of the Verkhovna Rada of Crimea
- In office 15 May 2002 – 21 September 2005
- Preceded by: Yuri Kornilov
- Succeeded by: Vladimir Zakoretsky

Personal details
- Born: 3 August 1957 (age 69) Akhunbabayev, Uzbek SSR, Soviet Union (now Uzbekistan)
- Education: Andijan State Medical Institute

İlmi Rustem oğlu Ümerov (Ukrainian: Ільмі Рустемович Умеров, romanized: Ilmi Rustemovych Umerov; Russian: Ильми Рустемович Умеров, romanized: Ilmi Rustemovich Umerov; born 3 August 1957) is a Crimean Tatar politician currently serving as deputy leader of the Mejlis of the Crimean Tatar People since 2015. He previously served as Deputy Chairman of the Verkhovna Rada of Crimea from 2002 to 2005, head of the Bakhchysarai Municipal State Administration from 2005 to 2014, and as Deputy Prime Minister of Crimea from 1994 to 1997.

== Early life and career ==
İlmi Rustem oğlu Ümerov was born on 3 August 1957 at the state farm named after Akhunbabaev, located in the Toshloq District of the Uzbek SSR of the Soviet Union. In 1980, he graduated from the Andijan State Medical Institute specialising in medical business. For the next eight years he worked in medicine; from 1980 to 1981 at the Fergana Maternity Hospital, from 1981 to 1984 as an obstetrician and gynaecologist at the Margilan Hospital, from 1984 to 1986 as an anaesthesiologist at the Margilan Silk Plant medical unit, and from 1986 to 1988 as an anaesthesiologist in the Central District Hospital in Krymsk.

In 1988, Ümerov moved to the city of Bakhchysarai, his family's hometown before the deportation of the Crimean Tatars. In Bakhchysarai, he worked as an engineer at the Dostluk cooperative from 1990 to 1992 before becoming director of Elmaz VAT, a position he held until 1994.

== Political career ==
In 1989, Ümerov became a founding member of the OKND, a Crimean Tatar dissident movement. Two years later, he joined the Mejlis of the Crimean Tatar People. From 1991 to 1994, he was Chairman of the Bakhchysarai Regional Mejlis. In 1994, he was elected as a member of the Verkhovna Rada of Crimea, but he left office in October of the same year to become Deputy Prime Minister of Crimea. He served in this position until 1997. Afterwards, he returned to leading the Bakhchysarai Regional Mejlis, serving from 1998 to 2002. At the same time, he served as deputy of the Bakhchysarai Municipal State Administration from 2000 to 2002.

In 2002, Ümerov became Deputy Chairman of the Verkhovna Rada of Crimea, a position he held until 2005. In the 2004 Ukrainian presidential election, he was head of Viktor Yushchenko's campaign in Ukraine's 10th electoral district. Shortly before leaving the position of Deputy Chairman of the Verkhovna Rada of Crimea, he became head of the Bakhchysarai Municipal State Administration.

== Annexation of Crimea by Russia ==
Amidst the annexation of Crimea by the Russian Federation, Ümerov condemned the annexation, urging residents of Crimea to boycott the 2014 Crimean status referendum. Despite this, he initially continued to hold his position as head of the Bakhchysarai Municipal State Administration under Russia. However, on 19 August 2014, he resigned from the position due to his refusal to take an oath to serve Russia.

On 15 March 2015, he became a deputy chairman of the Mejlis of the Crimean Tatar People, serving alongside Nariman Celâl (elected 2013), Ahtem Chiygoz (elected 2008), and Aslan Ömer Qırımlı (elected 2013).

=== Criminal proceedings ===
On 12 May 2016, Ümerov was detained by the Russian authorities in Crimea after making statements in support of the territorial integrity of Ukraine on the ATR television channel. Prior to his arrest, Ümerov had received offers to be brought to mainland Ukraine, but refused, viewing the need to fight for Crimean Tatars within Crimea as a matter of paramount importance. Ümerov was recognised as a prisoner of conscience by Amnesty International.

Ümerov's trial was marred by irregularities; in August 2016, he was sent to a psychiatric facility, where he spent three weeks before being released. Due to restrictions placed on him by courts, he was unable to receive medical care for his diabetes, Parkinson's disease, and heart disease. One of Ümerov's lawyers was detained and barred from representing him during hearings. On 27 September 2017, Ümerov was found guilty of charges of inciting separatism and sentenced to two years of penal labour. He was additionally prohibited from public activities and speaking to media for two years.

In September 2016, Ümerov was fined ₽750 for participating in a meeting of the Mejlis of the Crimean Tatar People.

On 25 October 2017, following negotiations by President Petro Poroshenko and Turkish President Recep Tayyip Erdoğan, Ümerov was released from detention alongside Ahtem Chiygoz and flown to Turkey. From Turkey, Ümerov and Chiygoz returned to Ukraine, landing on 27 October 2017.
