= Crimea Platform =

Ukrainian diplomatic initiative aimed at recovering control over Crimea

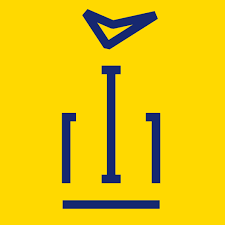
- Emblem of the Crimea Platform
- Founded: 23 August 2021
- Headquarters: Ukraine
- Website: crimea-platform.org

The Crimea Platform (Ukrainian: Кримська платформа, romanized: Krymska platforma; Crimean Tatar: Qırım Platforması) is a diplomatic summit initiated by Ukrainian President Volodymyr Zelenskyy in August 2021 and attended by delegations from 46 Western-aligned countries. It is designed to be an international coordination mechanism to restore Russia–Ukraine relations by means of reversing the 2014 annexation of Crimea by the Russian Federation. The protection of the human rights of Crimean Tatars, environmental degradation and the stifling of trade in the Black and Azov Sea region are also matters discussed at the summit.

The inaugural summit of the platform took place on 23 August 2021, on the eve of the 30th anniversary of Ukrainian independence. As of 2025, three more high-level summits, as well as three parliamentary summits, among other events within the platform, have taken place since, according to its official website.

== Creation and promotion ==
Plans for such an event were announced by the Ministry of Reintegration of Temporarily Occupied Territories, and at the 75th session of the UN General Assembly in September 2020. The first mention of the Crimea Platform initiative appeared in November 2020, when First Deputy Foreign Minister Emine Japarova presented it to the ambassadors of EU member states and discussed the practical aspects of involving the European Union in its activities. Subsequently, the Ukrainian authorities conducted a campaign to involve Western countries in the platform. On 26 February 2021, President Zelenskyy signed a Decree "On Certain Measures Aimed at Deoccupation and Reintegration of the Temporarily Occupied Territory of the Autonomous Republic of Crimea and the City of Sevastopol", which decided to establish the Organizing Committee for the preparation and holding of the Crimea Platform. The Chairman of the Organizing Committee for the Preparation of the Constituent Summit of the Crimea Platform is the Minister for Foreign Affairs of Ukraine Dmytro Kuleba. It is expected that the Crimea Platform will be represented in the Parliamentary Assembly of the Council of Europe.

== Negotiation topics, formats ==
Foreign Minister Dmytro Kuleba has identified five expected priorities for the Crimea Platform negotiation platform:

Firstly, security, including freedom of navigation. Second, ensuring the effectiveness of sanctions against the aggressor state. Third, the protection of human rights and international humanitarian law. Fourth, protection of educational, cultural and religious rights. Fifth, overcoming the negative impact of the temporary occupation of Crimea on the economy and the environment

Negotiations will be conducted in five key areas:

- the policy of non-recognition of the attempted annexation of Crimea by Russia,
- expansion and strengthening of international sanctions against Russia,
- international security,
- human rights,
- the impact of occupation on the economy and the environment.

Special attention will be paid to the issue of Crimean political prisoners on the occupied peninsula.

After the Summit, the activities of the Crimea Platform will not end. Four formats of its work are planned: presidential, foreign ministers, deputy and expert. The intergovernmental level will act in the form of consultations of foreign ministers, coordination meetings of specialized working groups on priority areas, conferences. In particular, it is possible to establish an annual forum dedicated to the security of the wider Black Sea region and beyond.

The Crimea Platform inter-factional parliamentary association (Rustem Umierov, Mustafa Dzhemilev, Ahtem Chiygoz, Yelyzaveta Yasko, Vadym Halaichuk) has been established in the Ukrainian parliament, which is developing a package of bills concerning the temporarily annexed peninsula.

In June, the expert network of the Crimea Platform was presented at the press centre of the Ukraine Crisis Media Centre. The event was attended by representatives of the Crimean Human Rights Group, Ukrainian Prism and Centre for Journalistic Investigations. The founding forum of the Crimea Platform expert network with the participation of representatives of the Ministry of Foreign Affairs, embassies, national and international experts took place on 6 August in Kyiv.

The Crimea Platform is also expected to be represented in the Parliamentary Assembly of the Council of Europe.

The platform intends to remain operational until the peninsula returns to Ukrainian control.

== Attendees ==
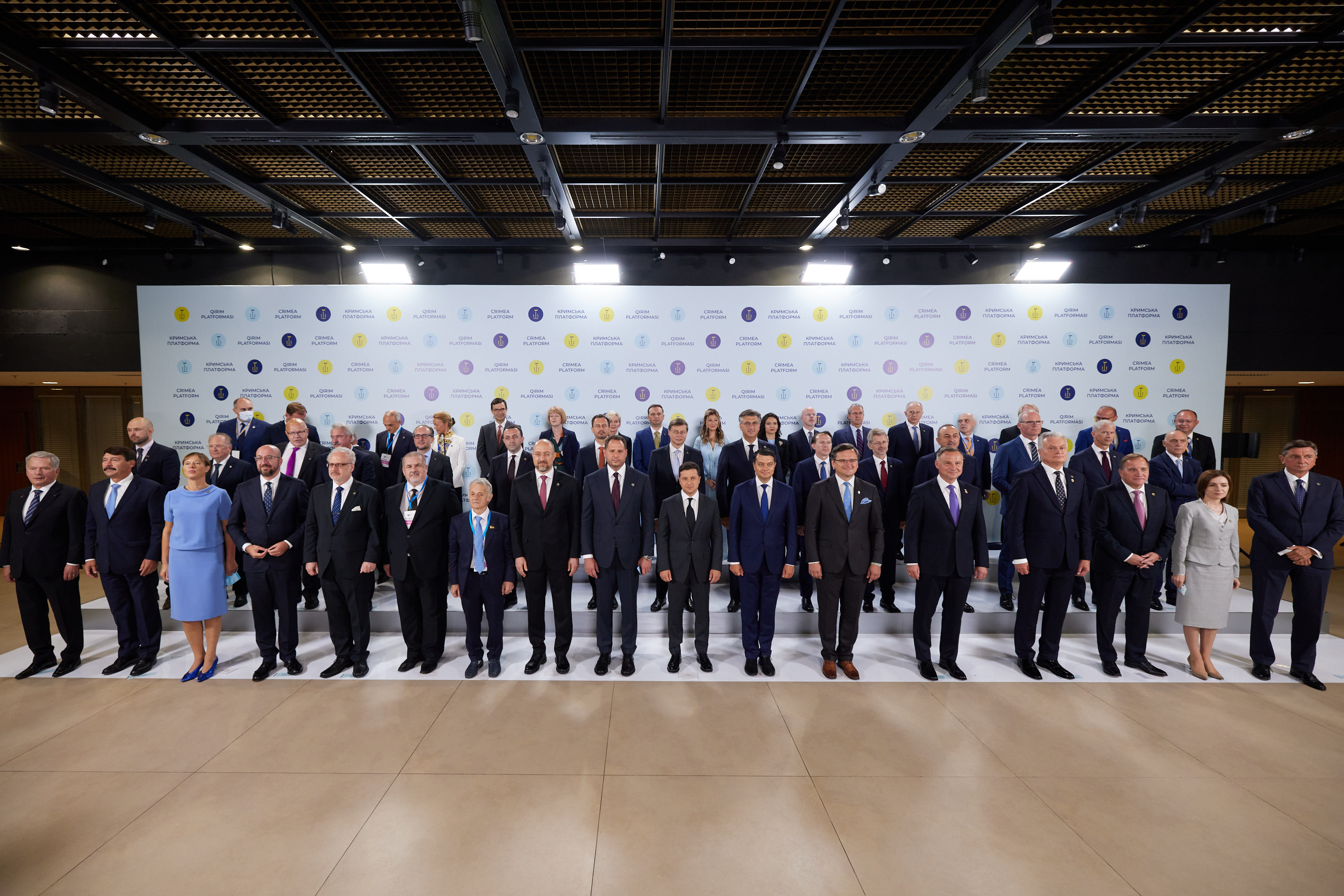
Participants of first meeting of the Crimea Platform

Foreign leaders had been invited to the 30th anniversary celebrations as well as the summit, including the leaders of United States, Greece and Lithuania. Turkey, the United States, Canada, the United Kingdom and Moldova were the first to announce plans to send representatives to the summit. Israel was also invited to the conference.

As for Russia, the Ministry of Foreign Affairs previously allowed participation in the Crimea Platform, setting the condition: "If it is planned to discuss the resumption of Crimean water supply and electricity supply, lifting Kyiv's trade and transport blockade of the peninsula". Ukrainian side rejected such possibility. Russia later called Kyiv's efforts to return Crimea "illegitimate", and the participation of any countries and organizations in the Ukrainian initiative a "direct encroachment on Russia's territorial integrity".

Russia also tried to undermine the credibility of the platform and prevent other states from participating in it through blackmail and intimidation - for this reason the list of those invited to the summit had to be kept secret.

Despite all the circumstances, representatives of 47 countries and organizations are expected at the summit on August 23.

The United States was represented by a member of the Cabinet. This was announced by the US Chargé d'Affaires in Ukraine, Deputy Assistant Secretary of State for European and Eurasian Affairs George Kent in an interview with Radio Liberty.

After the summit, President Zelenskyy awarded the Order of Prince Yaroslav the Wise to eleven attending heads of state and government.

=== List of attendees ===
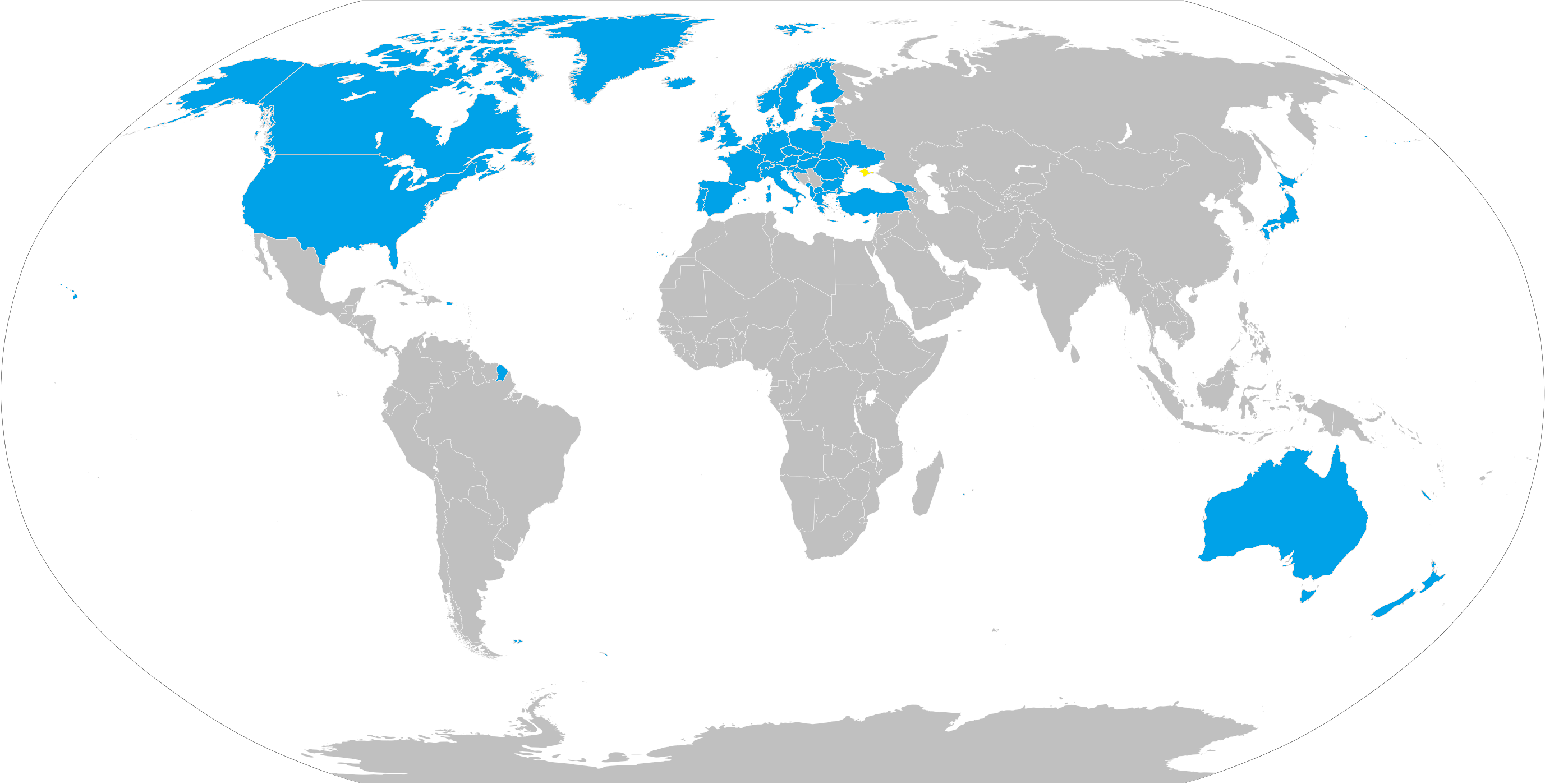
Map of participants of the Crimea Platform

==== G7 Member states ====
- Canada - Speaker of the Senate George Furey
- France - Foreign Minister Jean-Yves Le Drian
- Germany - Minister for Economic Affairs and Energy Peter Altmaier
- Italy - Deputy Minister of Foreign Affairs Benedetto Della Vedova
- Japan - ambassador Kurai Takashi
- United Kingdom - Minister for Europe and America Wendy Morton
- United States - Secretary of Energy Jennifer Granholm

==== Other attendees ====
- Albania - Foreign Minister Olta Xhaçka
- Australia - ambassador Bruce Edwards
- Austria - Foreign minister Alexander Schallenberg
- Belgium - Foreign Minister Sophie Wilmès
- Bulgaria - Foreign Minister Svetlan Stoev
- Croatia - Prime Minister Andrej Plenković
- Cyprus - ambassador Luis Telemachus
- Czech Republic - President of the Senate of the Czech Republic Miloš Vystrčil
- Denmark
- Estonia - President Kersti Kaljulaid
- Finland - President Sauli Niinistö
- Georgia - Prime Minister Irakli Garibashvili
- Greece - ambassador Vasilios Bornovas
- Hungary - President János Áder
- Iceland - ambassador Eidun Atlason
- Ireland - Foreign Minister Simon Coveney
- Latvia - President Egils Levits
- Liechtenstein
- Lithuania - President Gitanas Nauseda
- Luxembourg - Foreign Minister Jean Asselborn
- Malta - ambassador Godwin Montanaro
- Moldova - President Maia Sandu
- Montenegro - Foreign minister Đorđe Radulović
- Netherlands - Minister of Trade and Development Tom de Bruijn
- New Zealand - ambassador Si'alei van Toor
- North Macedonia - Foreign minister Bujar Osmani
- Norway - State Secretary of the Ministry of Foreign Affairs Audun Halvorsen
- Poland - President Andrzej Duda
- Portugal - Foreign Minister João Gomes Cravinho
- Romania - Foreign Minister Bogdan Aurescu
- Romania - Prime Minister Florin Cîțu
- Slovakia - Prime Minister Eduard Heger
- Slovenia - President Borut Pahor
- Spain - Secretary for EU Affairs Juan González-Barba Pera
- Sweden - Prime Minister Stefan Löfven
- Switzerland - President of the National Council Andreas Aebi
- Turkey - Foreign Minister Mevlüt Çavuşoğlu
- Council of Europe - General Secretary Marija Pejčinović Burić
- European Union (European Commission) - Vice president Valdis Dombrovskis
- European Union (European Council) - President Charles Michel
- GUAM - General Secretary Altay Əfəndiyev
- NATO - Deputy Secretary General Mircea Geoană

== Offices of the Crimea Platform ==
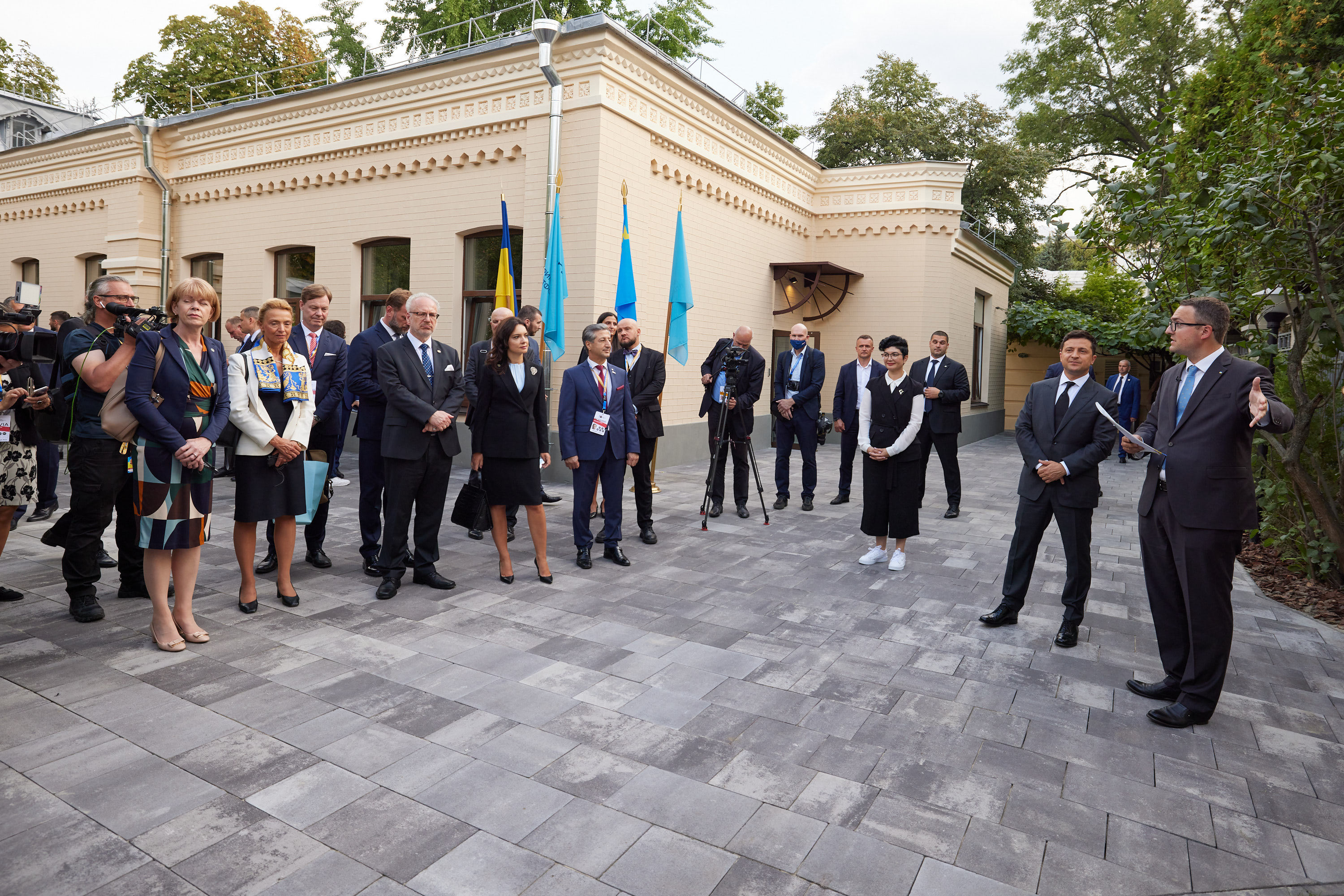
Opening of the main office of the Crimea Platform

On the day of the summit, its participants opened the main office of the Crimean Platform, located in Kyiv, at Lypska street, 2. Among the tasks of the office, in particular, is round-the-clock monitoring of the situation in the occupied peninsula on human rights, economic and environmental situation, cultural heritage, etc., promoting the strategy of deoccupation and reintegration of Crimea, informing and communicating with Ukrainian citizens from Crimea with international partners. The head of the office is Anton Korynevych, the President's Permanent Representative to the Autonomous Republic of Crimea.

It is planned to open offices of the Crimean platform in some other countries that are signatories of the declaration.

== See also ==
- Day of Resistance to Occupation of Crimea and Sevastopol
- History of Crimea
