= Yuriy Dzhygyr =

Ukrainian public figure

Yuriy Dzhygyr Юрій Джигир

Deputy Minister of Finance (Ukraine)
- Incumbent
- Assumed office 26 July 2018

Personal details
- Born: 19 November 1975 (age 50)
- Party: Independent
- Education: National University of Kyiv-Mohyla Academy; Maxwell School of Citizenship and Public Affairs of Syracuse University

Yuriy Dzhygyr (Ukrainian: Юрій Джигир, born 19 November 1975) is a public economist and Ukraine's Deputy Minister of Finance in the government of Oleksiy Honcharuk.

== Education ==
Dzhygyr graduated from the National University of Kyiv-Mohyla Academy in Kyiv, Ukraine, in 1999, with a double-major BA degree in Economics and Political Science.

He continued studies in the Maxwell School of Citizenship and Public Affairs of Syracuse University, USA, to receive an MA degree in economics, specializing in Public Finance, in 2001.

== Career ==
=== Development consulting ===
During 2001–2018, Dzhygyr was engaged in provision of technical advice to governments in Ukraine, Central and Eastern Europe, Central Asia, East Asia and Pacific regions on developing and implementing budget reforms and promoting sound budgeting practices at national and sub-national levels. He worked as an individual expert and as a director of a commercial consultancy, FISCO id, which he set up in 2006.

Within one of the projects, Dzhygyr co-authored a research initiative to understand the failures in the governance and financing of Ukraine's healthcare system This work was later used to develop Ukraine's health financing reform and to design global indicators of healthcare system governance.

=== Public service and contribution to post-Maidan reforms ===
After the Revolution of Dignity in 2014, Dzhygyr spent four years working as a non-staff adviser to Ukraine's new government, concentrating on health financing and fiscal decentralization. He was in the core team designing the 2017 health financing reform, calling to replace the Post-Soviet centralized and hierarchical Semashko-type system with a tax-based funding model involving a national level single-payer.

In early 2018, Dzhygyr has proposed a new approach to financing national public broadcasting in Ukraine. He suggested funding Ukraine's National Public Broadcasting Company, NPBC by earmarking 50% of the rent charged by the state for the use of radio frequency resource. This was proposed as a measure to make NPBC funding more transparent and to protect it from political influencing. This approach was supported by the supervisory board of the NPBC as “one of the most reliable options” and “in line with the Council of Europe recommendations” and was approved by the Board as its formal proposal for reform on 5 April 2018. The idea was also supported by the EU-Ukraine Civil Society Platform (a joint EU-Ukraine civil society organization set up as a requirement of the EU-Ukraine Association Agreement). However, as of August 2019, it remained in consideration by the Government and was not yet introduced in practice,

On 26 July 2018, Dzhygyr was appointed as Ukraine's Deputy Minister of Finance to cover public spending in social and humanitarian sectors. In this office, Dzhygyr continued to oversee healthcare financing as well as public spending on social protection, education, science, culture and sports.

One of the key reforms during Dzhygyr's time in office was the on-going transformation of Ukraine's program of subsidies on housing and utilities payments for poor households, the country's key social assistance scheme. The reform entailed “monetization” of subsidies, whereby the recipients would be granted in cash instead of payment discounts. He was also working on the a wide-scale intervention to verify the databases of subsidy recipients to identify fraud and mistakes - a measure which proved highly unpopular, but led to considerable budget savings.

As a deputy Minister of Finance, Dzhygyr was also promoting introduction of a new funding mechanism for Science, Technology and Innovation (STI). This involved replacing line-item funding of a pre-selected range of research facilities with a competitive grant scheme through a newly established National Research Fund.

After the change of Government in Ukraine in 2019, Dzhygyr was re-appointed at his post of the Deputy Minister of Finance.
