= Nariman Dzhelyal =

Deputy chairman of the Mejlis of the Crimean Tatar People

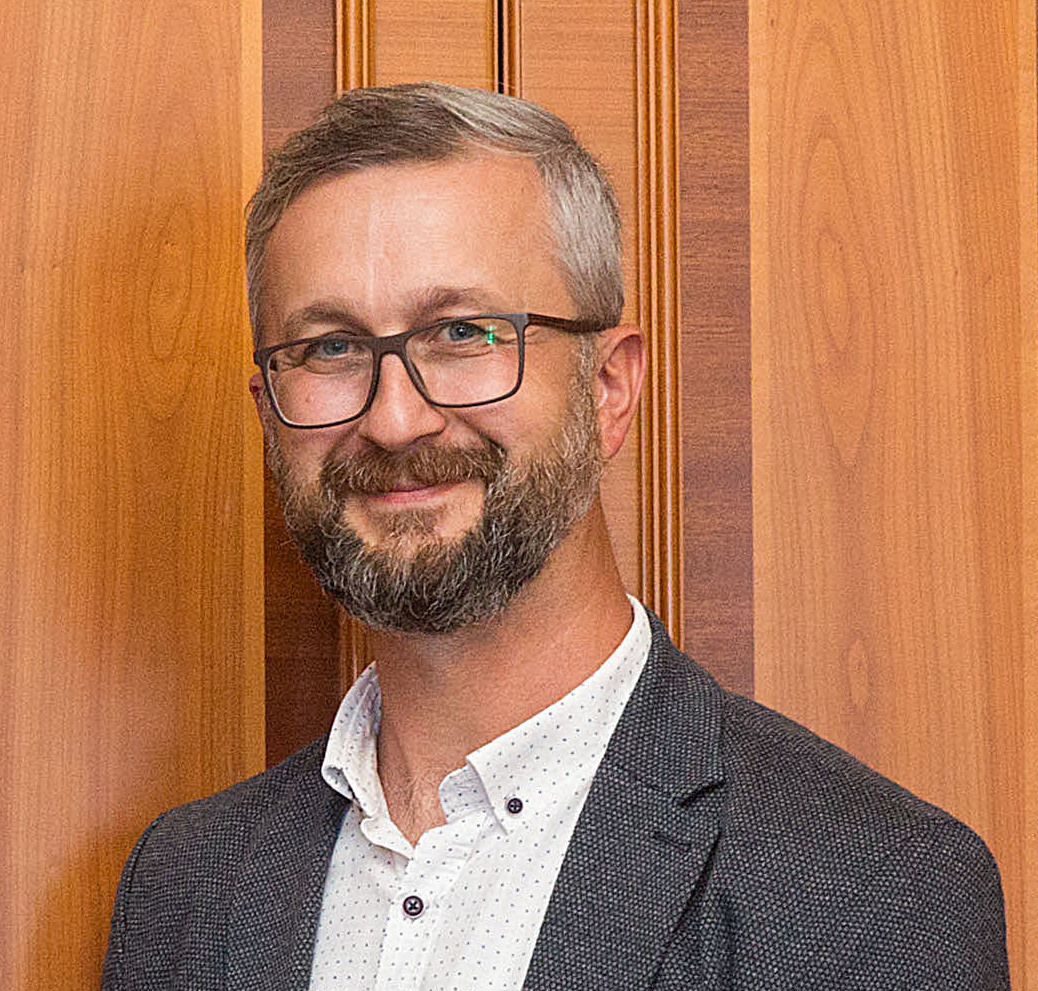

Personal details
- Born: 27 April 1980 (age 46) Navoiy, Uzbek SSR, Soviet Union

Nariman Dzhelyal Enverovych (Crimean Tatar: Nariman Celâl, Ukrainian: Наріман Джелял) (born 27 April 1980) is Ukraine's Ambassador to the Republic of Turkey, the first deputy chairman of the Mejlis of the Crimean Tatar People, journalist and activist.

Arrested in September 2021, he was sentenced in September 2022 to 17 years in prison but liberated in June 2024 as part as an exchange of prisoners between Ukraine and Russia.

In December 2024, he became Ukraine's ambassador to Turkey.
