= Andijan State Medical Institute =

Medical higher education institution in Andijan, Uzbekistan

Coordinates: 40.788153°N 72.372672°E

Andijan State Medical University
- Andijon Davlat Tibbiyot Universitet
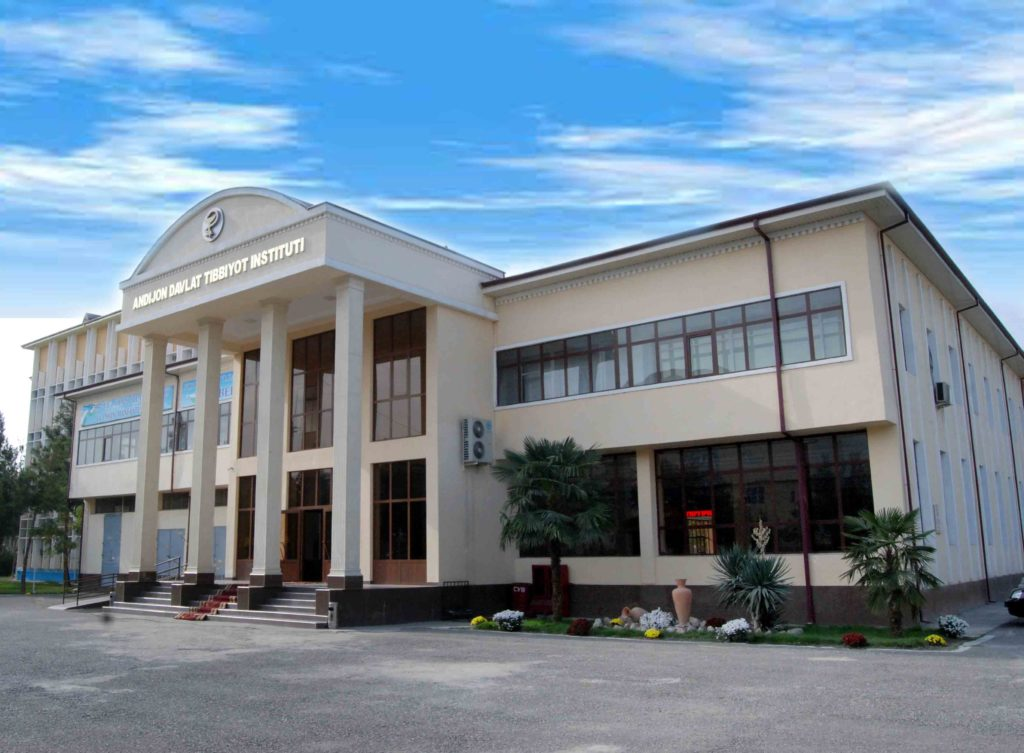
- Type: National
- Established: 21 September 1955
- Rector: Madazimov Madamin Muminovich
- Location: Andijan, Andijan, Uzbekistan
- Language: Uzbek, Russian, English
- Website: adti.uz

Andijan State Medical University (ASMI) is the biggest medical University and research center in Uzbekistan, founded in 1955.

== Overview ==
Andijan State Medical Institute has obtained University status in April 2025. The University trains medical staff in areas of Therapeutic, Pediatric, Dentistry, Professional Education, Preventive Medicine, Pharmacy, High Nursing Affair and Physicians’ Advanced Training. At present 3,110 students have been studying at the institute. The institute has trained more than 13,000 physicians (including 800 clinical interns, 1,116 masters, 200 postgraduates and 20 doctoral students). 870 staff work at the institute at present, including 525 professorial-teaching staff in 55 departments.

There are four faculties at the Andijon State Medical University: the therapeutic Faculty, the Pediatric Faculty, the dentistry and the Raising Qualifications of Physicians Faculty. All are related to the medical sciences and have their own departments.

=== Curative Works Faculty ===
The Curative Works Faculty is the oldest operating faculty at the University. It was opened in October 1955, the year of ASMI's founding. During its first years of action, there were 10 departments and about 120 students at the faculty. In 1957, interest in the faculty grew rapidly among applicants. Under docent M.G Mirzakarim (dean from 1957 to 1970), the faculty reached its prominence, and it had one of the biggest base of textbooks in Uzbekistan.

From 2013, the dean of the Curative Works Faculty has been Adham Anvarovich Gofurov, a docent and doctor of medical sciences. Students study in the branches: curative works, medical pedagogics and higher education nursing. Enrollment is approximately 1740 students. There are 14 departments at the Curative Works Faculty, which are mainly located inside the ASMI campus and clinic. These departments are:

- Traumatology, orthopedics, neurosurgery and injuries medicine
- Hospital therapy, endocrinology and hematology
- Hospital surgery and stomatology
- Languages, pedagogics and psychology
- Military training
- Physical education and curative physical education
- Normal physiology, bioorganic chemistry, biochemistry
- Anatomy
- Inner illnesses
- Surgery
- First training of general physicians
- Second training of general physicians
- 6–7 courses genecology
- 6–7 course surgery, urology and first aid

=== Pediatric Faculty ===
The Pediatric Faculty was opened at ASMI in 1977, and focuses on training pediatric specialists. (There was an earlier Pediatric Faculty at Central Asian Medical Pediatric Institute in Tashkent, operating from 1966 to 1972.) Currently there are 14 departments at the faculty which are mainly located inside the campus and its clinics; other departments are located in hospitals of the Andijan region. The faculty consists of 253 professors and teachers, in the following fourteen departments:

- Social-humanitarian subjects
- Medical biology, histology, medical and biological physics, informatics, medical technology and new techniques
- Pediatric surgery
- Illnesses and epidemiology
- Clinic radiology, oncology
- Pharmacology and clinic pharmacology
- Psychiatry, and clinical psychology, neurology and kid's neurology
- Ophthalmology
- Kids illnesses, neonatology and urgent pediatrics
- Pediatrics
- Hospital and clinic pediatrics
- Microbiology, immunology
- General and social hygiene, control of the medical system
- Anatomy

=== Raising Qualifications of Physicians Faculty ===
This faculty mainly focuses on giving practical knowledge to doctors of the Fergana, Andijan and Namangan regions, updating their skills with new techniques and practices, developing specializations, and working toward a second degree. It was established on 6 July 1984 by edict number 864 of Uzbekistan's Public Health Ministry. The Faculty cooperates with "Tashkent Institution of Raising doctor's qualification" and with the Tashkent Medical Academy. Studies are held according to a plan from the Public Health Ministry. There are seven departments which give the following specific lessons (with training hours per academic year):

- Therapy – 6580 hours per year
- Pediatrics – 5938 hours per year
- Neonatology – 3770 hours per year
- Surgery – 3965 hours per year
- Genecology – 3570 hours per year
- Ophthalmology – 3770 hours per year
- First aid – 2530 hours per year

Only doctors who have worked in their related field for at least three years can apply to the Faculty, where they can continue their studies and scientific researches.

No.	Foreign partner (university, organization, international organization, foundation, institution)	Country	Validity period
1	State Medical University Zapara	Ukraine	2010–2025 years
2	N.N. Russian Scientific Center of Oncology. Bloksin	Russian Federation	2013–2018 years
3	Novosibirsk State Medical University	Russian Federation	2013–2018 years
4	Institute of Urology and Nephrology of Ukraine	Ukraine	2013–2018 years
5	St. Petersburg State Institute of Pediatrics	Russian Federation	2013–2018 years
6	Turkey State Adjibadem Clinic	Turkey	2013–2018 years
7	Kharkov Academy of Postgraduate Education	Ukraine	2013–2018 years
8	University of Pisa	Italian	2014–2019 years
9	Jaypee hospital	Indian	2014–2019 years
10	Tambov State Medical University named after G. Derzhavin	Russian Federation	2015–2020 years
11	Koshitsa University named after Pavel Josef	Slovakia	2015–2021 years
12	Russian State Academy of Postgraduate Medical Education	Russian Federation	2015–2020 years
13	Kharkov National Medical University	Ukraine, Kiev	2015–2020 years
14	National Research Institute of Neurosurgery named after Academician N. N. Burdenko	Russian Federation	2016–2021 years
15	Reaviz Medical University, Samara	Russian Federation	2016–2025 years
16	University of Cologne	Germany	2017–2022 years
17	St. Petersburg State Medical University	Russian Federation	2017–2022 years
18	Yongnam University Medical Center	South Korea	2017–2022 years
19	Sahmyook medical Center-Seoul Adventist Hospital	South Korea	2017–2022 years
20	Keiming University, Dongsan Medical Center	South Korea	2017–2022 years
21	Stavropol State Medical University	Russian Federation	2017–2022 years
22	National Postgraduate Medical Academy named after P. L. Shupika	Ukraine, Kiev	2017–2022 years
23	N.I. Russian National University named after Pirogov	Moscow, Russia	2017–2022 years
24	Osh State University	Kirgizia, Osh	2018-
25	NGO Lymph	Russia, Moscow	2017–2022 years
26	Ural State Medical University	Russian Federation	2018–2023 years
27	Kirov State Medical University	Russian Federation	2018–2023 years
28	First Moscow State Medical University named after I.I. Sechenov	Russian Federation	2018–2023 years

== Dormitory ==
From the first years of ASMI's establishment, there was a dormitory for the students located in a student-town. Between 1960 and 1961, two 400-student dormitories were built. In 1964, a new dormitory was built, able to hold about 400 more people. After this occasion, additional construction began; in 1974, the Institute had built a dormitory for 630 students. In 1986, students town gained a new building for 230 students. In 2000, ASMI opened new building for the Social-Humanitarian Sciences department which was able to house 400 students. After creation of 2 academic lyceums under the Institute, the students-town gained a new building for 200 students. Each dormitory at the students-town has its own kitchen, rest rooms, study and computer rooms.

In 2010, Andijan city hosted the "Universiade – 2010" competitions which are held in Uzbekistan between the universities and institutions. Because of this, ASMI renovated the buildings in students-town, adding sports halls, small buildings, and living rooms. These complexes where then made available to the students.

For International Students

In 2022, two newly built hostels, one for male students and one for female students, were provided for international students, featuring complete Euro-renovation.

== Rectorate ==
The rectorate of Andijan State Medical University consists of five representatives who share leading positions at the ASMI. Currently, the rector and head of the ASMI is Madazimov Madamin Muminovich, who is a doctor of medical sciences and professor. The vice-rectors on educational process is Abdulajanov B.R, who is a professor and doctor of medical sciences. The second Vice-rector of the ASMI on scientific researches of the Institute is Salakhindinov Kamoldin Zuhritdinovich who is a professor and doctor of medical sciences. Last vice-rector of the Institute is Mamajonov Zafar Abdujalilovich.

== Location ==
Andijan State Medical University is located in Uzbekistan, Andijan region, Andijan city, Yu.Atabekova street, house 1.

== See also ==
- Tashkent State Technical University
- Tashkent Institute of Irrigation and Melioration
- Tashkent Financial Institute
- Moscow State University in Tashkent named M.V Lomonosov
- Tashkent Automobile and Road Construction Institute

== Links ==
- Information about the Institute in Uzbek oliygoh.uz checked 28 March 2016
- Information about the institute in Uzbek checked 28 March 2016
- Second web-site of the Institute checked 28 March 2016
- Official article about the Institute in English checked 28 March 2016
