= Qurultay of the Crimean Tatar People =

National congress of the Crimean Tatar people

The Qurultay of the Crimean Tatar People is a national congress and the supreme representative plenipotentiary body of the Crimean Tatar people that first met in 1917 at the Bakhchysarai Palace. It was there in December 1917 that the Qurultay first declared the existence of the short-lived Crimean People's Republic.

At the Qurultay, Crimean Tatars are represented by delegates elected by Crimean Tatars permanently residing on the territory of Ukraine, regardless of their nationality, as well as Crimean Tatars and members of their family who are citizens of Ukraine, regardless of their place of residence.

Credentials of Qurultay endure for five years. Delegates often represented the People's Movement of Ukraine in the Verkhovna Rada of Crimea until the Rada's dissolution in 2014.

In 2017, to commemorate the 100th anniversary of the Qurultay, the National Bank of Ukraine issued a commemorative 5 Hryven coin.

Today, within Ukraine, it is officially considered a public organization of the Crimean Tatar National Movement.

== Gallery ==
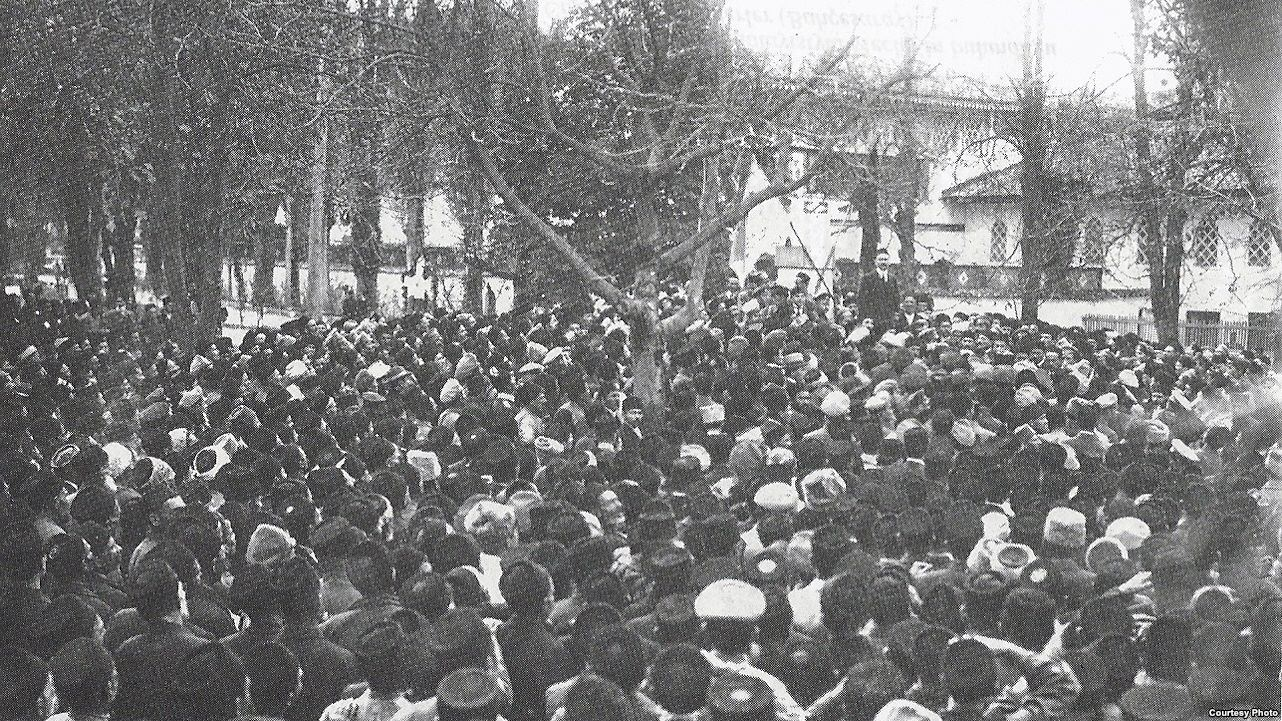
The 1917 gathering of Qurultay near the Bakhchisaray Palace

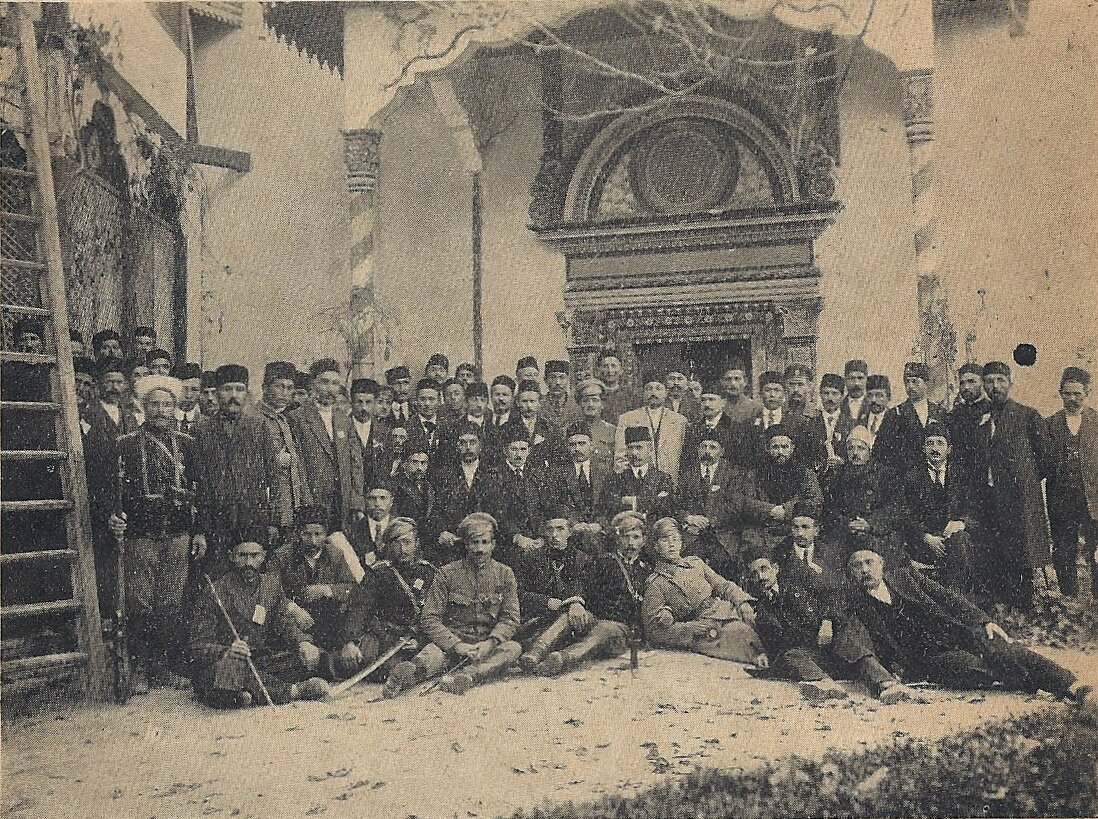
Members of the 1917 Qurultay of the Crimean Tatar People

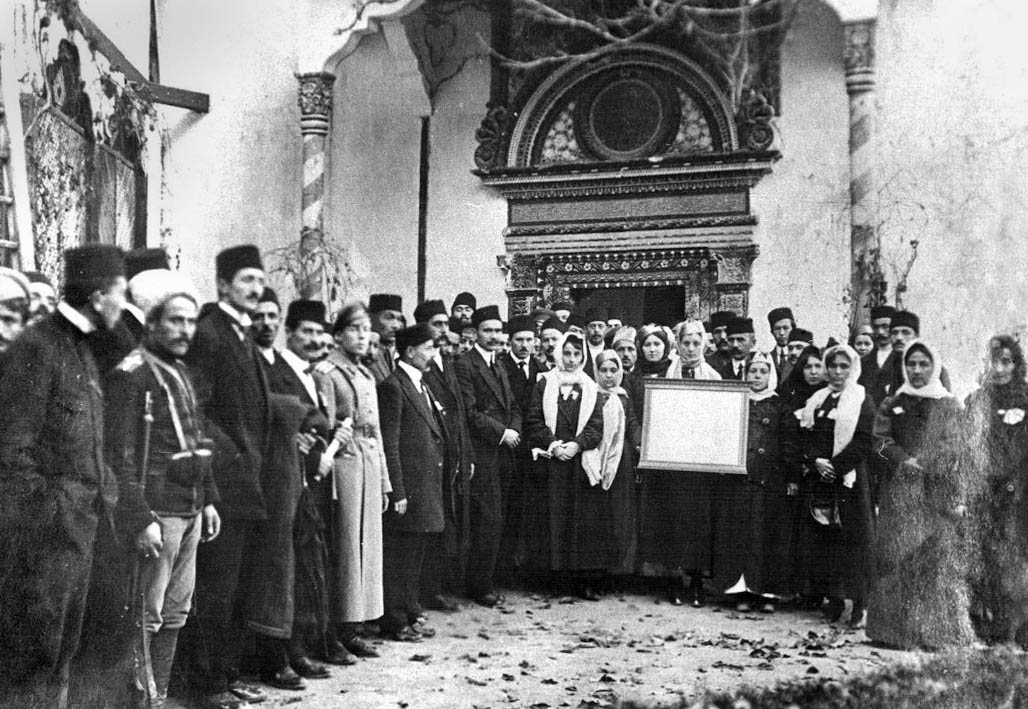
Members of the 1917 Qurultay of the Crimean Tatar People

== See also ==
- Mejlis of the Crimean Tatar People (Assembly)
- Qurultai-Rukh, a regional branch of the People's Movement of Ukraine in Crimea.
