= Mejlis of the Crimean Tatar People =

Crimean Tatar rights organisation

- Qırımtatar Milliy Meclisi
- Emblem

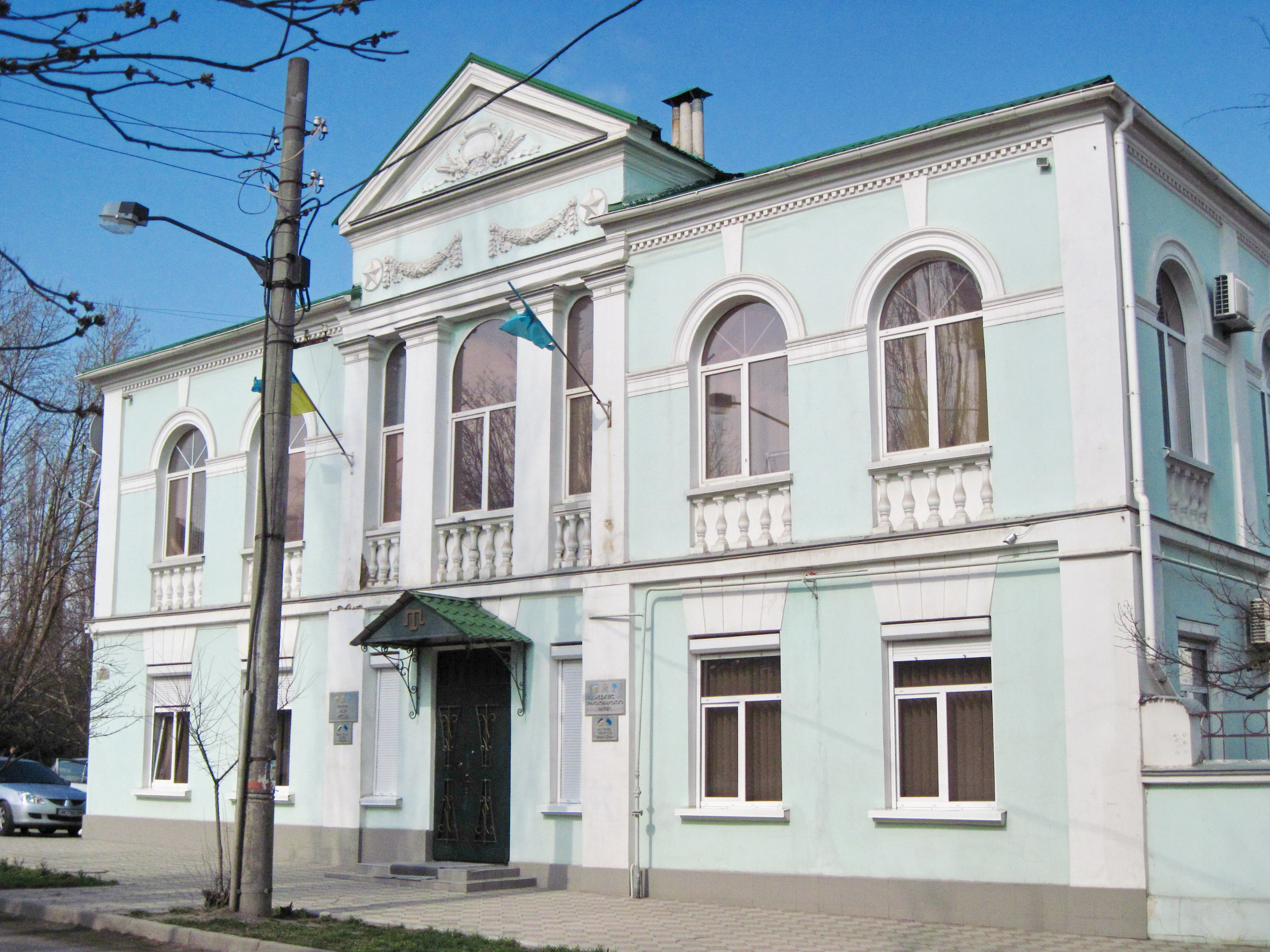
- Mejlis building in Simferopol confiscated by the Russian authorities
- Formation: 1991
- Headquarters: St. Bolsunovska, 2, Office 233, Kyiv, Ukraine
- Chair: Refat Chubarov
- Vice-chair: İlmi Ümerov
- Website: https://qtmm.org/qt/

The Mejlis of the Crimean Tatar People (Crimean Tatar: Qırımtatar Milliy Meclisi) is the single highest executive-representative body of the Crimean Tatars in the period between sessions of the Qurultay of the Crimean Tatar People. The Mejlis is a member institution of the Platform of European Memory and Conscience.

The Mejlis was outlawed by Russia in 2016 for "the use of propaganda of aggression and hatred towards Russia, inciting ethnic nationalism and extremism in society" and listed as an extremist organization (Note: see List of organisations banned in Russia) two years after the 2014 Russian annexation of Crimea. (Note: Since the Russian annexation of Crimea, the status of the Crimea and of the city of Sevastopol is under dispute between Russia and Ukraine; Ukraine and the majority of the international community considers the Crimea and Sevastopol an integral part of Ukraine, while Russia, on the other hand, considers the Crimea and Sevastopol an integral part of Russia, with Sevastopol functioning as a federal city (Russian authorities are in control of both).) In April 2017, the International Court of Justice delivered its order on the request for the indication of provisional measures, according to which Russia must lift the ban; Russia has since ignored and refused to comply with the ICJ's decision.

== Etymology ==
Majlis is the Arabic word for a sitting room, however it can also refer to a legislature as well, and is used in the name of legislative councils or assemblies in some states of the Islamic world.

== Leadership ==
From its foundation in 1991 until 2013, the chairman of the Mejlis was Mustafa Dzhemilev. Since October 2013, the chairman is Refat Chubarov. The Mejlis's deputy leader is İlmi Ümerov.

== History ==
=== Creation ===
The current Mejlis was founded in 1991, to act as a representative body for the Crimean Tatars which could address grievances to the Ukrainian central government, the Crimean government, and international bodies. In its activities Mejlis is subordinated to Qurultai, guided by its decisions, current regulations, the Mejlis of the Crimean Tatar people statute, norms of international law and legislative acts of Ukraine not in contradiction with these standards. The main goal of the Mejlis is the liquidation of consequences of genocide conducted by the Soviet state in regard to the Crimean Tatars (Surgun of 1944), reinstatement of national and political rights of the Crimean Tatar people and realization of their rights the free national state self-determination on its national territory. The Mejlis of the Crimean Tatar people consists of 33 members including the Mejlis chairperson. The Mejlis initially used a building located in Simferopol.

On 30 June 1991, the Mejlis declared its sovereignty over the Crimean Tatars, and adopted the Crimean Tatars' national anthem and national flag. Also, the Crimean Tatars elected 14 Crimean Tatar Deputies to the Verkhovna Rada of Crimea. These 14 deputies were the first Crimean Tatar representatives in the Crimean Parliament in over 50 years.

=== 1991–2014: Activities and relation to Ukrainian politics ===
During the 1998 parliamentary elections, members of the Mejlis joined the Rukh election list.

On 6 April 2010, several pro-Russian Crimean political leaders in Crimea demanded the disbanding and banning of the Mejlis and all other forms of political representation for the Crimean Tatars, including the Qurultay, claiming that these were "organized criminal groups" and their activities "unconstitutional." Crimean Tatar organizations urged President Viktor Yanukovych to "protect Crimea's indigenous people from discrimination".

During the 2012 parliamentary elections, members of the Mejlis joined the All-Ukrainian Union "Fatherland" election list. Since 2012, Mejlis has been a member of the Platform of European Memory and Conscience.

The status of Mejlis was legalized by the Ukrainian Presidential decree of 18 May 1999 "About the council of representatives of Crimean Tatar people". In 2010, the President of Ukraine Viktor Yanukovych reformed the council, cutting its membership almost in half and establishing control over it by having its members appointed by the president.

=== 2014–2022: Russian occupation ===
On 20 March 2014, two days after the annexation of Crimea by Russia, the Ukrainian parliament officially and explicitly recognized the Mejlis as the executive body of the Qurultay and the Qurultay itself as the highest representative body of the Crimean Tatar people. The Ukrainian parliament also recognized the Crimean Tatars as indigenous people of Ukraine.

In March 2014, following the ousting of the Ukrainian president in the 2014 Ukrainian revolution and the subsequent takeover of Crimea by pro-Russian separatists and Russian special forces, local authorities held a referendum on "reunification with Russia", the official result of which was a large majority in support of the reunification. The Mejlis boycotted the referendum. (Note: The Mejlis also boycotted the 2016 Russian legislative election.) The referendum was illegal under the Constitution of Ukraine, and was not recognized by most countries, usually because of the presence of Russian forces. Russia then officially annexed Crimea on 18 March 2014. (Ukraine does not recognise the annexation and, backed by most of the international community, continues to assert its right over the peninsula. (Note: See: Political status of Crimea.)) After the annexation, most Mejlis members did not cooperate with the new Russian-Crimean authorities; of the six members that did, one became deputy speaker of the Crimean parliament, and another head of the Crimean State Committee for Interethnic Relations and Deported Peoples.

In May 2014, Crimean Tatar leader Mustafa Dzhemilev was prevented from entering Crimea, resulting in Tatars organizing large protests. There was a failed attempt to help Dzhemilev enter Crimea after Tatars broke through a border checkpoint. In response, Crimean authorities accused the Mejlis of "extremist activity" causing "illegal" gatherings marked by "violence and threats of violence", and warned that the Mejlis could be dissolved and outlawed across Russia.

On 3 July 2014, it was announced that for the first time, Mejlis would hold its session outside of Crimea in Henichesk. Russian law enforcement seized the Mejlis building in Simferopol on 20 September 2014.

The Mejlis was labeled an "extremist organisation" by Russian authorities in Crimea and banned by the Russian-appointed Supreme Court on 26 April 2016. According to Regional Prosecutor General Natalia Poklonskaya, it was banned because its leaders had sought to "destabilise" the region since the 2014 annexation by Russia through the use of "propaganda of aggression and hatred towards Russia, inciting ethnic nationalism and extremism in society". The Mejlis was also said to be responsible for stopping cargo traffic in the autumn of 2015 between mainland Ukraine and the peninsula and for a late November series of explosions that damaged voltage power lines, which led to a massive power outages. The Mejlis denied involvement in these events.

Also, on 26 April 2016, Council of Europe's Commissioner for Human Rights Nils Muižnieks urged the Court to reverse the ban since he believed "equating [the Mejlis] with extremism paves the way for stigmatisation and discrimination of a significant part of the Crimean Tatar community and sends a negative message to that community as a whole". Exiled in mainland Ukraine, Chairman of the Mejlis Refat Chubarov stated the Court's decision had been unjustifiable and that "the occupiers in Crimea are doing everything to crush Crimean Tatars and force everyone to be silent". Amnesty International stated that the ban "demolishes one of the few remaining rights of a minority that Russia must protect instead of persecute". Deputy Chairman of the Mejlis Nariman Celâl vowed that the organization would try to continue its work despite the ban, saying "it will continue working in Ukraine and other countries".

Deputy head of the Mejlis İlmi Ümerov was on 7 September 2016 released after a three weeks' involuntary detention for tests of his "mental capacity" in a psychiatric hospital in Simferopol, where he was taken after stating on TV that Crimea should be returned to Ukraine; doctors ruled him entirely sane. Ümerov was then charged with calling for Russia's borders to be changed, a charge punishable with up to five years in jail.

The Supreme Court of Russia upheld the ban on 29 September 2016. The Mejlis is contesting this ban in the European Court of Human Rights.

On 1 October 2016, Head of the Republic of Crimea Sergei Aksyonov explained that Natalia Poklonskaya accused Mejlis of energy blockade through diversion. The same day, Aksyonov's Vice-Prime Minister Dmitry Polonsky claimed that Mejlis is a "puppet organization" of the United States Department of State.

By late December 2016, nine Mejlis members were in mainland Ukraine, in Russia, or in self-imposed exile. One was imprisoned, and more than ten had been charged with criminal and administrative offences in Crimea.

In April 2017, the UN International Court of Justice issued an interim order against the Russian Federation to allow Crimean Tatar Mejlis' activities, and in July 2018, reminded Russia of its legal obligation.

In the 2019 Ukrainian Presidential Election, the Mejils supported the re-election campaign of then incumbent President Peter Poroshenko.

=== 2022–present: Russian invasion of Ukraine ===
On 28 February 2022, the Mejlis of the Crimean Tatar People condemned the Russian Federation, describing it as a "a terrorist state", and calling its military and political leaders international criminals on account of Russia's full-scale invasion of other parts of Ukraine.

== See also ==
- Majlis
