= Ahtem Chiygoz =

Ukrainian Crimean Tatar politician

- Ахтем Чийгоз
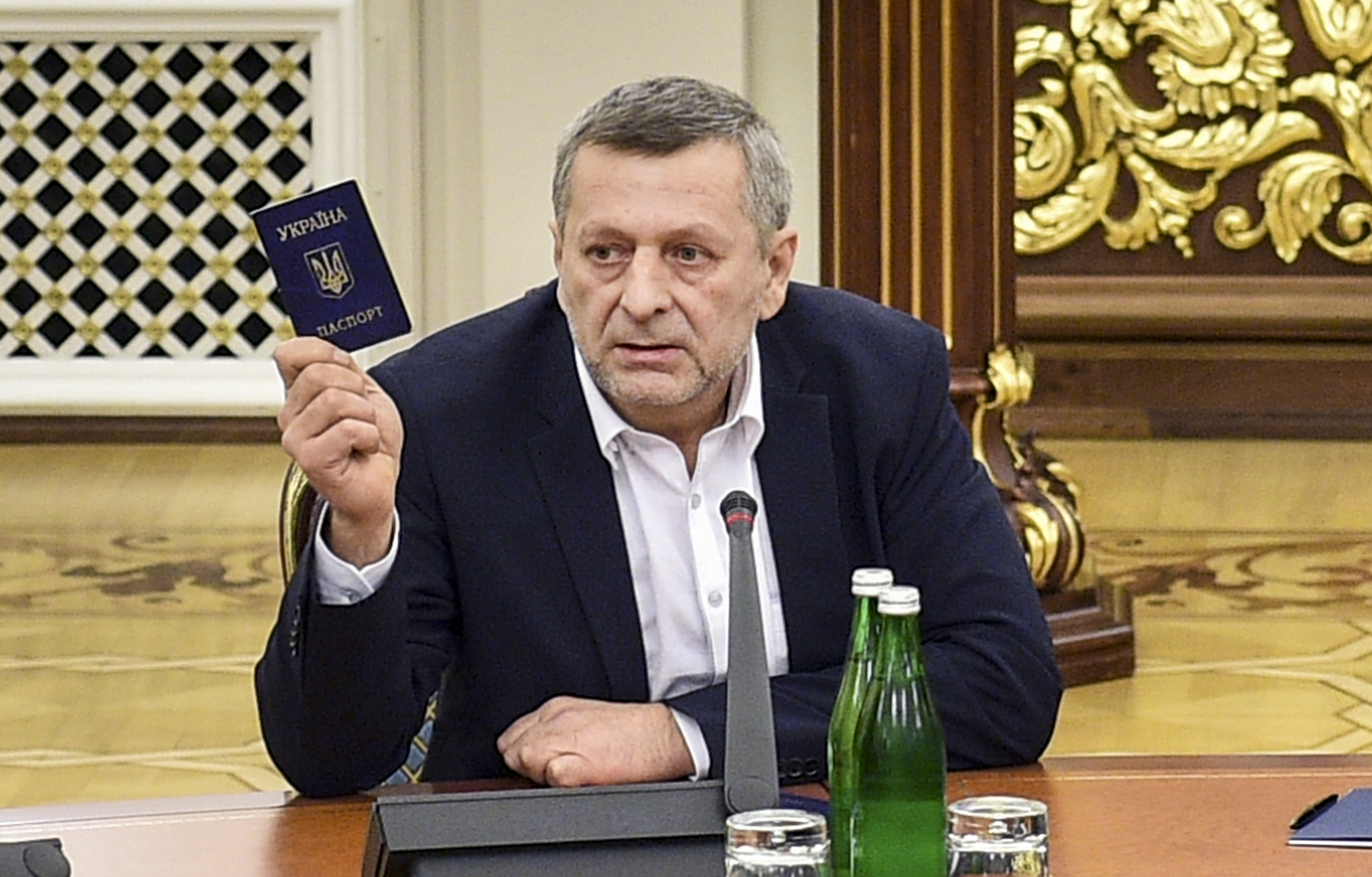

Deputy Chairman of the Mejlis of the Crimean Tatar People
- Incumbent
- Assumed office 2007

People's Deputy of Ukraine

9th convocation
- Incumbent
- Assumed office August 29, 2019
- Constituency: European Solidarity, No.8

Personal details
- Born: 14 December 1964 (age 61) Bulungur, Uzbek SSR
- Citizenship: Ukraine

Ahtem Chiygoz (Crimean Tatar: Ахтем Зейтулла огълу Чийгоз, romanized: Ahtem Zeytulla oğlu Çiygoz; Ukrainian: Ахтем Зейтуллайович Чийгоз, romanized: Achtem Zejtullajovyč Čyjhoz; born 14 December 1964) is a Crimean Tatar politician.

He was the Deputy Chairman of the Mejlis of the Crimean Tatar People starting 2008, and a People's Deputy of Ukraine in the convocation of the 9th Ukrainian Verkhovna Rada, Chairman of the Bakhchysaray regional Mejlis in 2002, and delegate to the Qurultay of the Crimean Tatar People.

== Biography ==
He is a former political prisoner of the Kremlin; following Russia's attempted annexation of Ukraine's Crimean peninsula he was arrested on January 29, 2015, and charged with organization of a rally in support of the territorial integrity of Ukraine that took place in Simferopol on February 26, 2014. He was freed on October 25, 2017.

In the 2019 Ukrainian parliamentary election, Chiygoz was elected to the Ukrainian parliament as a deputy for the party European Solidarity.

His other positions include Head of the Subcommittee on Ethnopolitics, Rights of Indigenous Peoples and National Minorities of Ukraine of the Committee of the Verkhovna Rada of Ukraine on Human Rights, De-occupation and Reintegration of the Temporarily Occupied Territories in Donetsk and Luhansk Regions and the Autonomous Republic of Crimea, the City of Sevastopol, National Minorities and International Relations.

As of 2024, he was living in Turkey with his family.
