= Mustafa Dzhemilev =

Soviet-Ukrainian human rights activist and politician

Hero of Ukraine Mustafa Dzhemilev
- Mustafa Cemilev; Мустафа Джемілєв
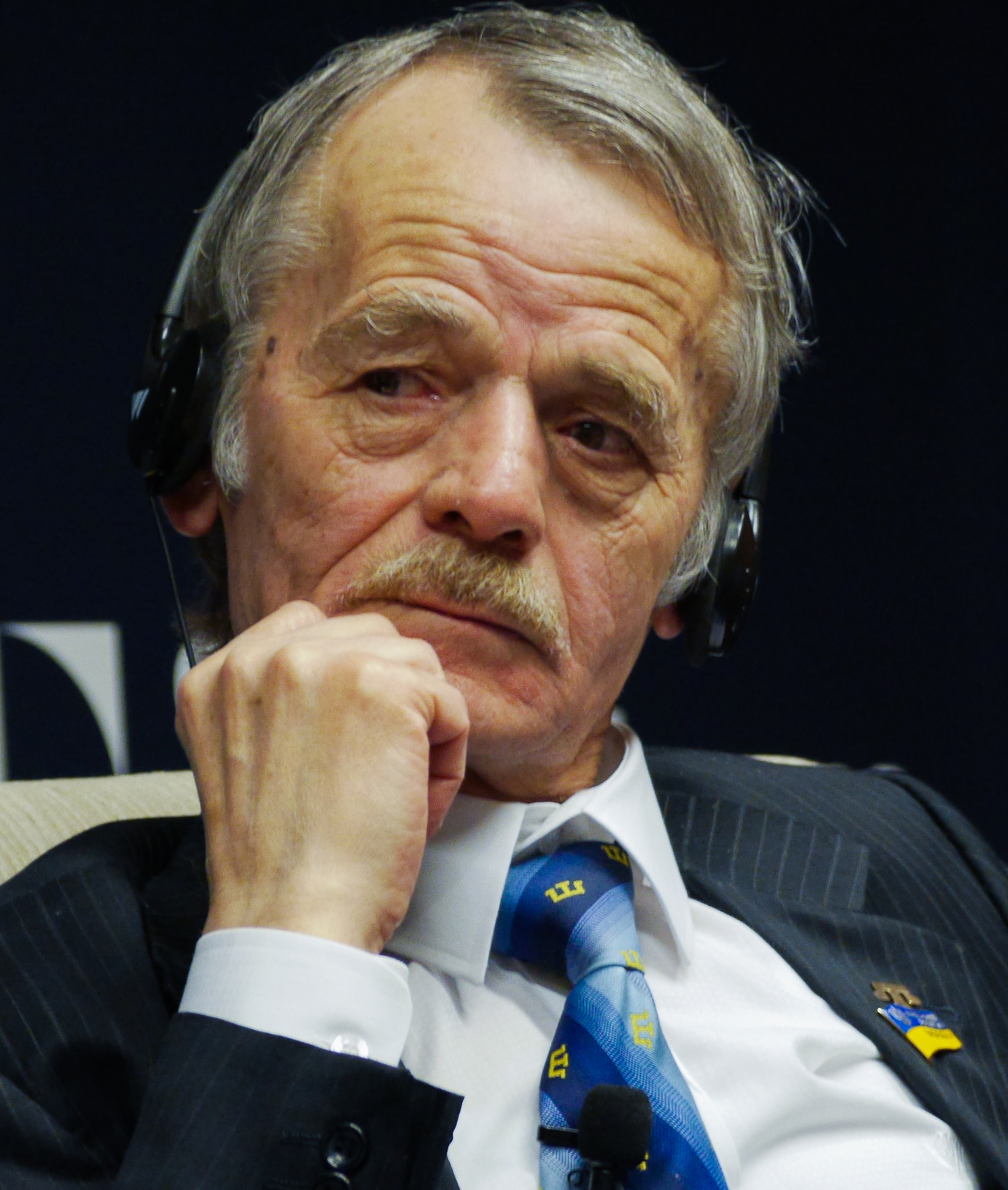

1st Chairman of the Mejlis of the Crimean Tatar People
- In office 6 June 1991 – 26 October 2013
- Preceded by: Post established
- Succeeded by: Refat Chubarov

1st Commissioner of the President of Ukraine for the Affairs of the Crimean Tatar People
- In office 20 August 2014 – 18 May 2019
- President: Petro Poroshenko
- Preceded by: Post established
- Succeeded by: Post is vacant

1st Chairman of the OKND
- In office May 1989 – 6 June 1991
- Preceded by: Position established
- Succeeded by: Rejep Khairedinov

1st Chairman of the Congress of Activists of the Crimean Tatar National Movement
- In office April 1987 – May 1989
- Preceded by: Position established
- Succeeded by: Merged into OKND
Parliamentary positions
People's Deputy of Ukraine
Incumbent
Assumed office 29 August 2019
Constituency	European Solidarity, No. 6^{[C]}
In office 27 November 2014 – 29 August 2019
Constituency	Petro Poroshenko Bloc, No. 5^{[C]}
In office 12 December 2012 – 27 November 2014
Constituency	Batkivshchyna, No. 12^{[C]}
In office 23 November 2007 – 12 December 2012
Constituency	NUNS, No. 27^{[C]}
In office 12 May 2006 – 23 November 2007
Constituency	Our Ukraine Bloc, No. 45^{[C]}
In office 31 March 2002 – 12 May 2006
Constituency	Our Ukraine Bloc, No. 28^{[C]}
In office 29 March 1998 – 14 May 2002
Constituency	Rukh, No. 9^{[C]}

Personal details
- Born: Mustafa Abdülcemil; 13 November 1943 (age 83) Ay-Serez, Crimean ASSR, Russian SFSR, Soviet Union^{[B]}
- Party: People's Movement of Ukraine (1998-2002); Our Ukraine Bloc (2002-2012); Batkivshchyna (2012-2014); Petro Poroshenko Bloc (2014-2019); European Solidarity (2019-present)
- Spouse: Safinar Dzhemilev
- Children: 3
- Education: Tashkent Institute of Irrigation and Agricultural Mechanization Engineers (expelled in 1965)
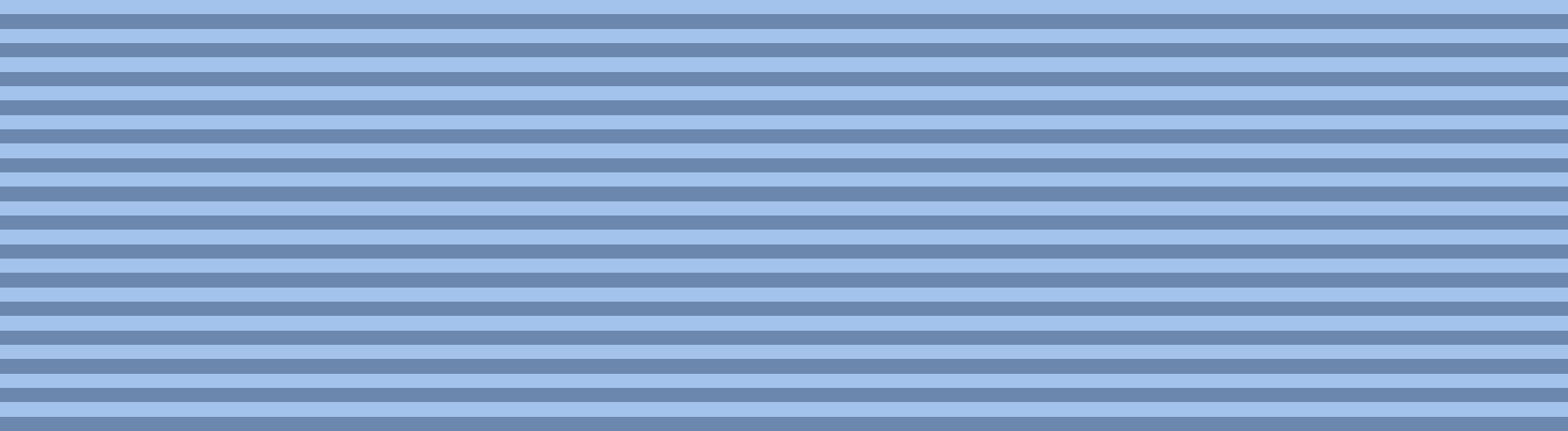
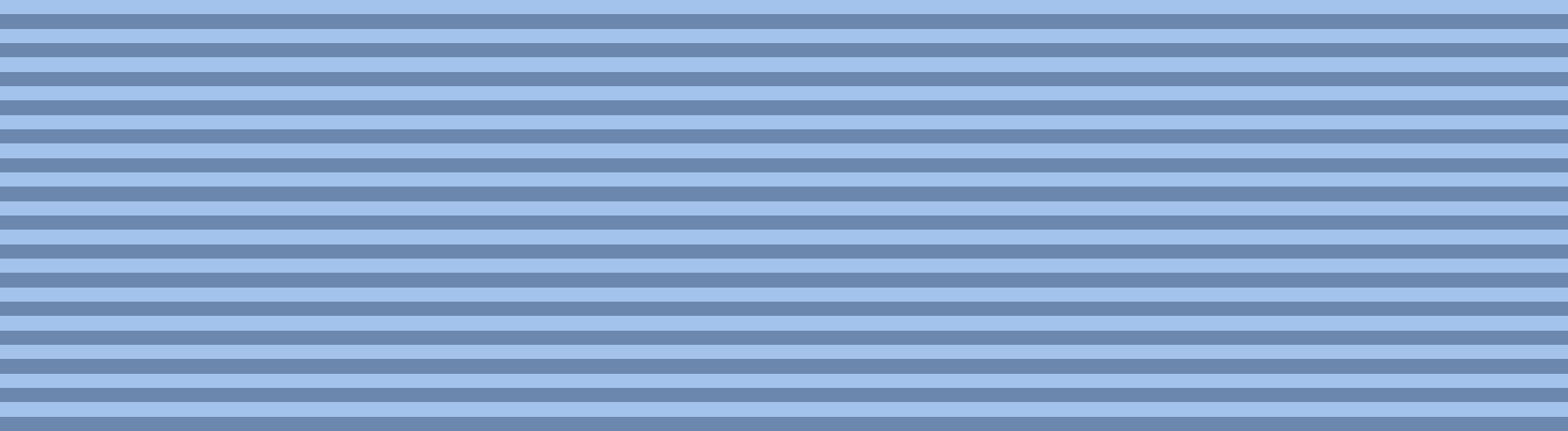
- Awards: Member of the Order of Liberty; Order of the Republic; Order for Merits to Lithuania
- B. At the time of his birth, Ay-Serez was technically under direct military occupation by Nazi Germany. C. Party-list proportional representation seat.

Mustafa Abduldzhemil Jemilev (Note: Crimean Tatar: Mustafa Abdülcemil Cemilev, Мустафа Абдюльджемиль Джемилев, [mustɑˈfɑ ɑbdyld͡ʒɛˈmil d͡ʒɛˈmilɛw]), also known widely with his adopted descriptive surname Qırımoğlu (lit. 'Son of Crimea'; Crimean Tatar Cyrillic: Къырымогълу, [qərəmɔɣˈlu])) (born 13 November 1943) is a Crimean Tatar-Ukrainian politician and civil rights activist who served as the Chairman of the Mejlis of the Crimean Tatar People from 1991 to 2013 and as a member of the Ukrainian Parliament since 1998. A prominent figure in the Soviet dissident movement post-1970s, he was imprisoned multiple times for his advocacy for Crimean Tatars. Most famously, he led a 303-day hunger strike, one of the longest ever, during his 1976 trial.

Born in Ay-Serez, Crimea, he was deported alongside his family in 1944 to the Uzbek SSR during the deportation of the Crimean Tatars. After moving to Tashkent, he joined the Crimean Tatar national movement there, which led to his first arrest in 1966, when he was 23. Over the following decades, he was arrested many times until he was finally released in 1986 during perestroika under Mikhail Gorbachev. The Crimean Tatar movement gained attention during the summer 1987 protests in Moscow, leading to the Gromyko Commission, and in 1989 he returned to Crimea after 46 years and became the Chairman of the Organisation of the Crimean Tatar National Movement (OKND), which later became the Mejlis of the Crimean Tatar People in 1991. After the collapse of the Soviet Union, he heavily supported Ukrainian statehood, opposing the pro-Russian faction of Crimea, which formed the Republic of Crimea. Dzhemilev entered national politics during the 1998 Ukrainian parliamentary elections on the party list of Rukh.

Over the following decades, he would support Euro-Atlanticism, the European Union, NATO, and the end of the renewal of the Black Sea Fleet in Crimea. He strongly clashed with the government of Viktor Yanukovych starting in 2010, and he finally stepped down as Chairman of the Mejlis after decades in the post. Despite this, he still condemned the 2014 Russian annexation of Crimea and was subsequently banned from entering Crimea by the Russian government. Ukrainian President Petro Poroshenko appointed Dzhemilev the Commissioner of the President of Ukraine for Crimean Tatar Affairs, a newly created role, from 2014 to 2019. Since then, Dzhemilev has served as a figurehead of the Crimean Tatars, having condemned the 2022 Russian invasion of Ukraine and provided repeated statements in support of Crimea returning to Ukraine. He was awarded the title of Hero of Ukraine in 2023 by President Volodymyr Zelenskyy for his contributions, and he has been awarded multiple other state titles in Turkey, Poland, and Lithuania. Specifically in Turkey, there are multiple parks and also a museum named in his honour.

== Early life ==
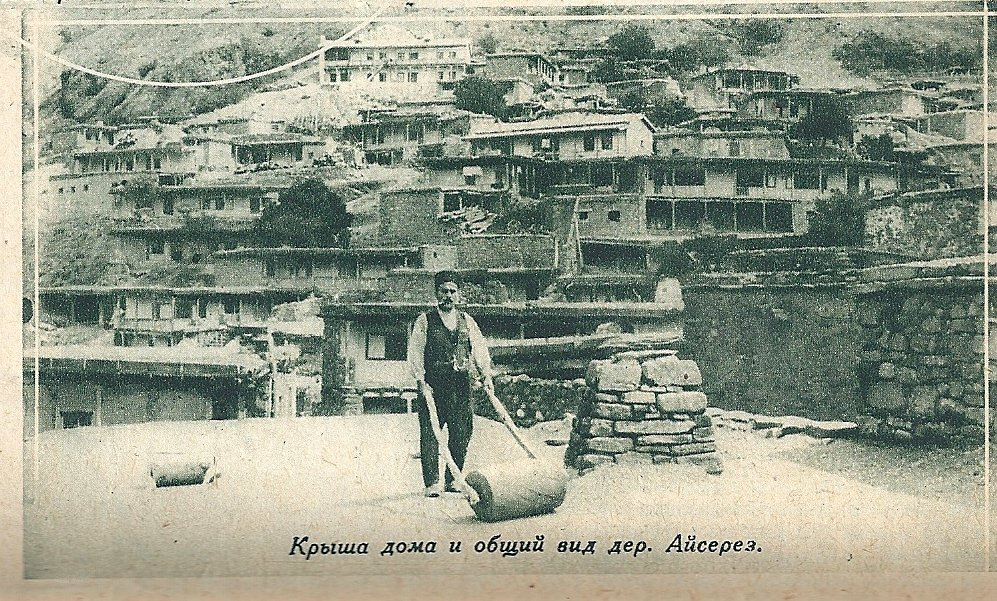
Ay-Serez before his birth in 1910, when it was still a majority Crimean Tatar.

A stamp of the Central Asian State University in Tashkent. In 1959, Dzhemilev was refused entry to the university because he was Crimean Tatar, which spurred the start of his dissident activities.

Dzhemilev was born on 13 November 1943 in the village of Ay-Serez, which is near the city of Sudak, in what was then de jure part of the Crimean ASSR of the Russian SFSR within the Soviet Union. At the time of his birth, however, Ay-Serez was occupied by Nazi Germany and was subject to a military administration, as it was never actually part of its Generalbezirk. Ay-Serez had been occupied since least November 1941, when the near entirety of Crimea, besides Sevastopol and Kerch, fell to the Germans after Operation Barbarossa. Dzhemilev himself was born into an ethnic Crimean Tatar family. He was the son of Abduldzhemil, an avid reader, although he did not even have a middle school education, and Mahfur, whom he recalled "knew the Quaran by heart". Abduldzhemil owned a vineyard, and had been earlier banished from Crimea and labeled as a kulak to the Urals in the 1930s, before returning back in secret. Mustafa had an elder brother by two years, Anafi, who Mustafa recalled read a lot and taught him how to critically evaluate information, and an elder sister, Vasfiye.

As part of the Crimean offensive, the village of Ay-Serez was liberated from German troops by the Soviets in April 1944. When Dzhemilev was only six months old, on 18 May 1944, the Deportation of the Crimean Tatars began in accordance with a GKO order under Joseph Stalin. In the GKO order, the Soviets ordered the deportation of Crimean Tatars because they accused them of collaborating with the Axis Powers and of both deserting and forming volunteer Crimean Tatar detachments and units. As such, in Ay-Serez, all Crimean Tatar residents were subjected to forced deportation to remote areas of Central Asia and the Russian SFSR. A total of 326 Crimean Tatar families, with a total of 1,537 people, were deported from Ay-Serez that day, including Mustafa's. Mustafa's family was sent to the Uzbek SSR, specifically to the far eastern Andijan Region.

In 1955, Dzhemilev's family moved to the oblast capital of Andijan, after some of the restrictions on the special settlements of Crimean Tatars were lifted, and then the next year to Mirzachul (now Gulistan). After graduating from secondary school in Mirzachul in 1959, Dzhemilev attempted to enter either the Faculty of Arabic Language and Literature or the Faculty of Oriental Studies at the Central Asian State University in Tashkent. However, he was openly denied on the justification that Crimean Tatars were not allowed or accepted into the faculty.

== Soviet-era politics ==
=== 1960s: Early beginnings in the Soviet dissident movement ===
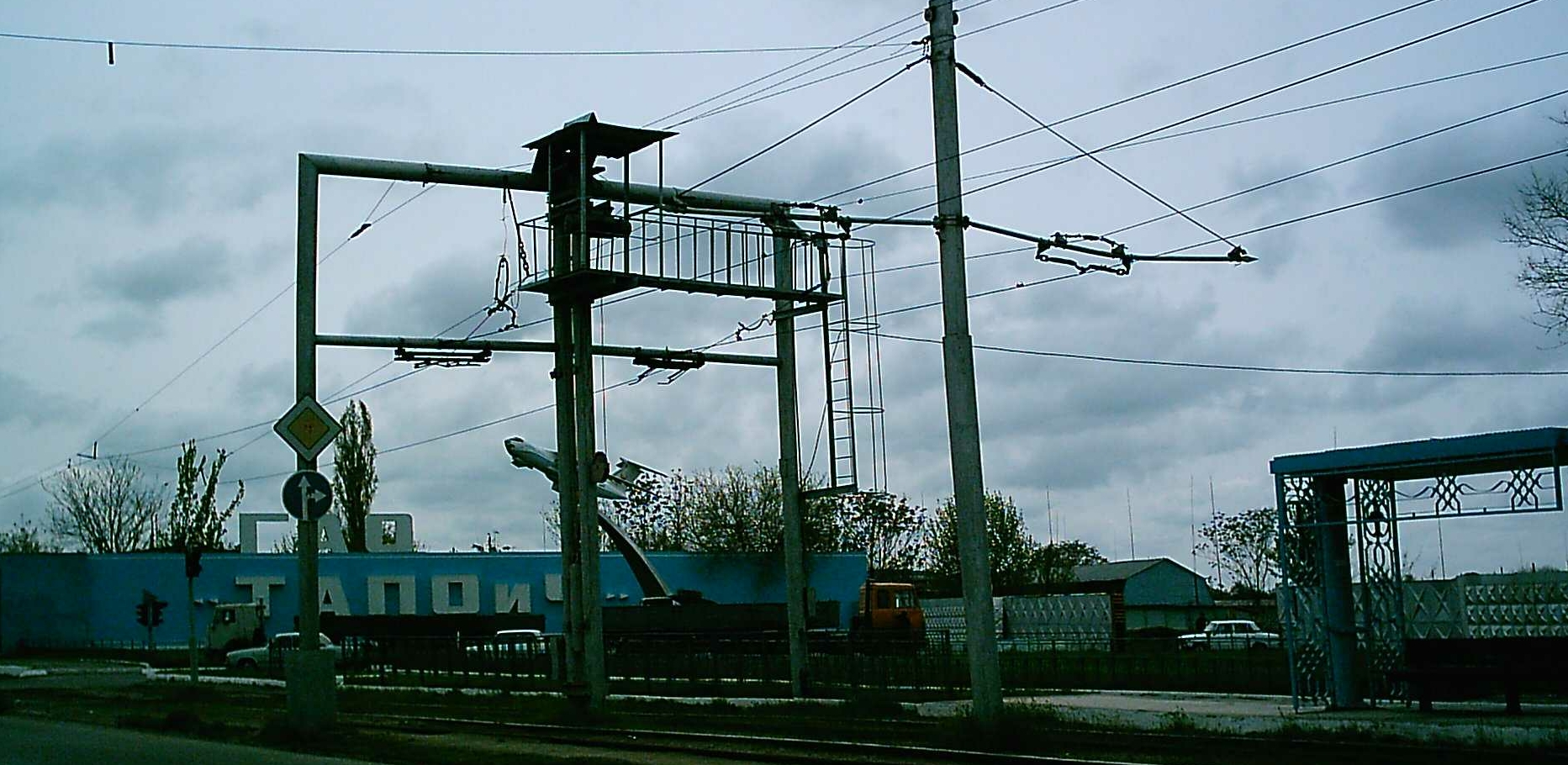
The entrance to the Tashkent Aviation Production Association, where his activities began..

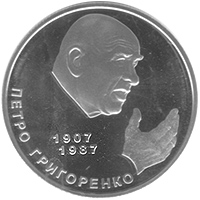
After his release in 1967, Dzhemilev became close friends with the Ukrainian dissident Petro Grigorenko (pictured on the coin), whom he lived with for some time in Moscow before being re-arrested in 1969.

After being denied admission to the university, he started working at the Tashkent Aviation Production Association. At the end of 1961, Dzhemilev began participating in the illegal student organisation "Union of Crimean Tatar Youth". The association defended the idea of Crimean Tatars being able to return to Crimea, and members read poems in Russian and in Crimean Tatar. Within the Union, an eighteen-year-old Dzhemilev headed the historical department, which was meant to unite appreciators of history and chronicle the Crimean Tatar people. However, due to a suspected informant, not even four months later, in the spring of 1962, the circle was destroyed. Its ideologists, Marat Omerov (a shift foreman at the tractor plant) and Seit-Amza Umerov (a student in the law department), were convicted of creating an anti-Soviet organisation and participating in anti-Soviet agitation and propaganda. They were sentenced to three to four years respectively in labour camps, while members who were caught, including Dzhemilev, were dismissed from work and put under KGB supervision.

After he was expelled from his job, Dzhemilev entered the Tashkent Institute of Irrigation and Agricultural Mechanization Engineers. While at the university, he continued to participate in dissident actions. He participated in a demonstration in August 1965 with a large group of Crimean Tatars outside of the Bekabad City Party Committee, who were demanding to meet with the First Secretary of the Uzbek SSR, Sharof Rashidov, which the militsiya had to disperse. Later on, on 11 September 1965, the participants in the events in Bekabad, including Dzhemilev, were arrested "for violating public order and hooliganism." Just a few months later, at the end of 1965, he was expelled from his university, with the justification of holding nationalist and anti-Soviet views by the KGB. This was because Dzhemilev distributed the manuscript "A Brief Historical Sketch of Turkic Culture in the Crimea in the XII-XVII Centuries". After some time being expelled, in May 1966, he refused to do his mandatory military service in the Soviet Army due to political reasons and evaded the draft. He was convicted for the first time after this and was sentenced to a year and a half in prison. Dzhemilev was then sent to a camp in the suburbs of Tashkent. During his time in prison in Tashkent, he was sent to a punishment cell for "conducting anti-Soviet propaganda among prisoners", which led him to go on a hunger strike. He was finally released in November 1967.

After being released, Dzhemilev started establishing contacts with more Soviet dissidents and human rights activists. He met and became close with another Crimean Tatar activist, Petro Grigorenko, with whom he lived for six months in Moscow. He also co-founded the first civic organisation in the USSR for human rights, the Initiative Group for the Defense of Human Rights in the USSR, on 20 May 1969. The group was created in response to his friend Grigorenko's arrest under Article 190-1 of the Criminal Code of the RSFSR on 15 May 1969 for distributing false fabrications. His Moscow period did not last long, though, as he was arrested again in September 1969 and accused of spreading knowingly false fabrications that disgraced the Soviet state. His arrest was consolidated with that of Grigorenko and Ilya Gabay.

During the 1969 case, which was heard in the Tashkent City Court, Dzhemilev defended himself and pleaded not guilty, with reinforced police squads and KGB officers standing guard. During his defense speech, he talked about the culture of Crimean Tatars and their attempts to return to Crimea, and spoke about the persecution of people who attempted to return. Unlike Gabay, who received a relatively lighter sentence of three years in prison under a general regime, Dzhemilev was sentenced to three years in prison under a strict regime. Following the verdict, more than 406 Crimean Tatars sent letters of protest to the Supreme Court of the USSR, while Dzhemilev announced a 30-day hunger strike while he was being kept in the Tashkent Pre-trial Detention Center. He was later transferred to Moscow to the Lefortovo Prison, before the Soviet authorities, in an investigation, terminated his more severe punishment, and instead sent him to serve time in camps around the Uzbek SSR.

=== 1970s: Repeated arrests and the Omsk Process ===
In the Russian city of Omsk (pictured here), Dzhemilev began one of the longest hunger strikes, which lasted 303 days, against his detention.

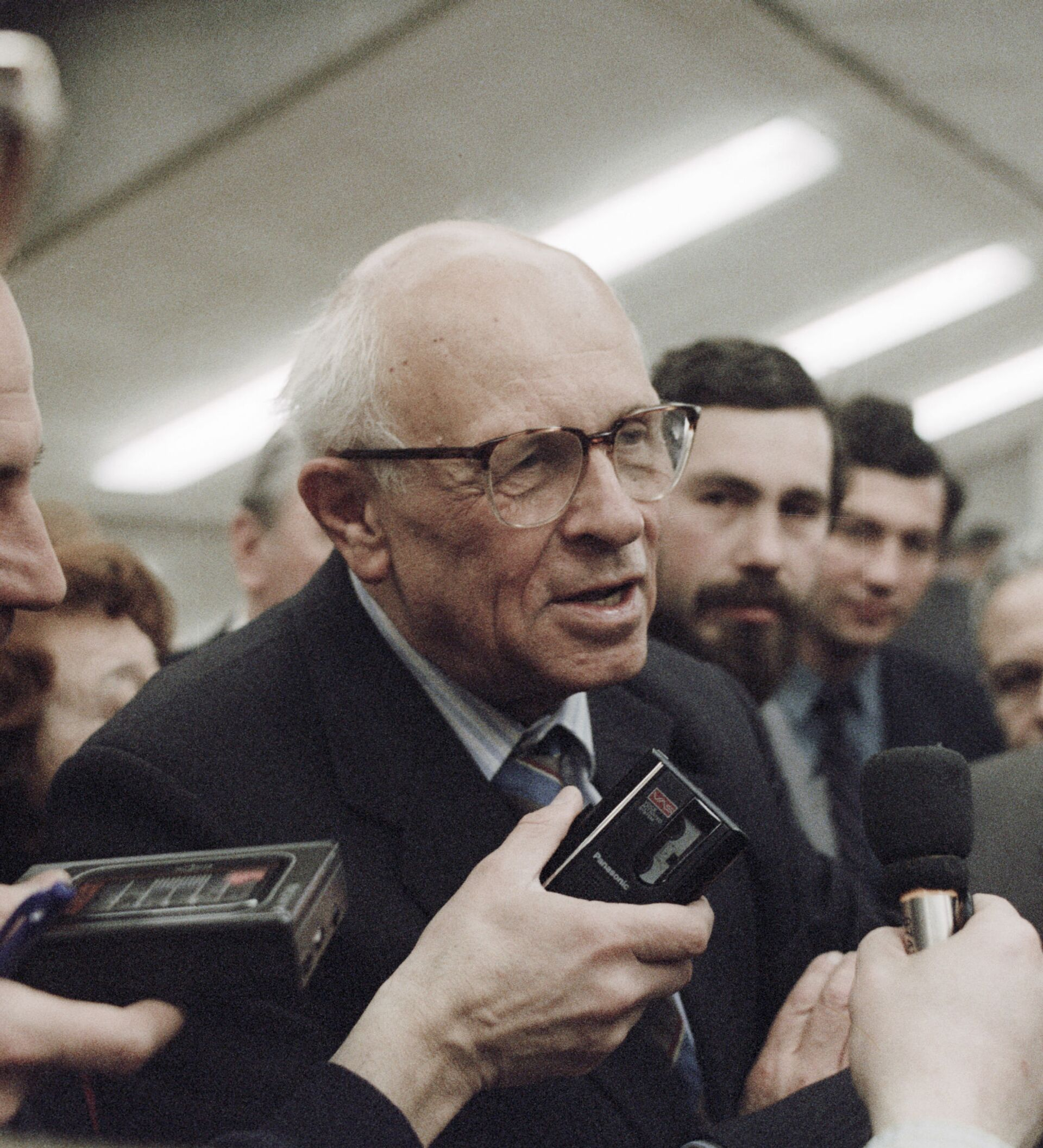
During Dzhemilev's time and trial in Omsk, Andrei Sakharkov (pictured here), another notable dissident, extensively defended Dzhemilev.

After being released in September 1972, Dzhemilev moved back to Gulistan and worked as an engineer at a state farm while being under public administrative supervision. Two years later, on 13 May 1974, a few days before the 30th anniversary of the deportation of the Crimean Tatars, authorities allegedly tried to provoke Dzhemilev into a fight to re-arrest him. According to eyewitnesses, however, Dzhemilev showed restraint in the face of the provocations, but he was still sentenced to 15 days "for hooliganism." In response, he began another hunger strike, which led to his release on the ninth day due to his serious condition. A month later, in June, despite the fact that Dzhemilev had not recovered from the earlier hunger strike, he was again called up for military training, and the medical commission found him fit. Dzhemilev attempted to provide certificates from a polyclinic in Tashkent, where he had been earlier treated, in order to opt out, but the authorities refused and did not let him undergo a second examination. After this, he was ordered to report with his belongings, which Dzhemilev refused to do. Thus, he was again arrested in Gulistan on 22 June 1974, his third arrest, which led him to start another hunger strike. According to Crimean Tatar sources, it was alleged that he was arrested not because he was refusing to do military service for a second time, but because the KGB had received intel that Dzhemilev was planning to go to Moscow to petition U.S. President Richard Nixon about the problems and conditions of the Crimean Tatars.

==== 1974-1976: Time in Omsk, hunger strike ====
His verdict was finally announced by the People's Court of Gulistan on 19 July 1974, with Dzhemilev being found guilty under Article 199, Part 1 of the Criminal Code of the Uzbek SSR, and he was sentenced to a year in prison in a high-security penal colony. He was transported to ITK-3/VTK-3 in the Russian city of Omsk in September. While in Omsk, prison guards began searching his belongings to allegedly fabricate new cases, although his belongings did not contain any prohibited items. In response, Dzhemilev wrote a statement to the head of the camp and Yuri Andropov, in which he expressed his belief that the frequent visits by the KGB officers were a retaliation for his political views about Crimea. Just a few days before he was set to be released, on 4 June 1975, a new case was brought forth against Dzhemilev under Article 190 of the Criminal Code of the RSFSR. The case relied on the testimony of one of the prisoners, V. Dvoryansky, which led him to start yet another hunger strike. During the few months in Omsk in preparation for the trial, Dzhemilev wrote a letter to a friend from Omsk, in which he accused the authorities of deliberately trying to provoke and punish him. His only friend, Grigorenko, even tried to reach out through his lawyer to request that he end his hunger strike, but Dzhemilev refused, saying he preferred to be kept in solitary confinement due to his cellmates being used as witnesses against him. In November, Grigorenko then tried to appeal to the Prosecutor of the RSFSR about what Dzhemilev had said about his conditions in the earlier letter and asked for the measure of restraint against him to be changed, but the Prosecutor's Office of Omsk immediately refused. His family then tried to appeal to the International Red Cross and Amnesty International. After this, the case became a Cause célèbre, as his hunger strike would go on for 303 days, one of the longest ever, and attracted significant international attention. Among those who wrote appeals were numerous Nobel Prize winners such as Heinrich Böll, Salvador Luria, and George Wald, alongside politicians Eqbal Ahmad, Jiří Pelikán, and Isa Alptekin.

==== 1976: Omsk trial ====
Dzhemilev's trial was initially scheduled for 6 April 1976 alongside Andrei Tverdokhlebov's, although Tverdokhlebov's was held in Moscow. Andrei Sakharov went to Dzhemilev's trial in Omsk, but it was delayed due to an accident and rescheduled for 14 April 1976 at the Omsk Regional Court. During the trial, Dzhemilev was accused of telling the prisoner Dvoryansky "knowingly false" claims about the Soviets and circulating documents during his time in prison. Dzhemilev later said that the KGB had pressured Dvoryansky, held him in a punishment cell, and initially tried to retract his testimony, but the KGB still held it true either way. Documents shown included a letter to Ilmi Umierov, which criticised a government article on Crimean Tatars, a draft known as the "Declaration of Principles of the Crimean Tatar Movement", and other letters that were interpreted as nationalist. Sakharov and Yelena Bonner were not permitted to attend the trial, and had to stand outside. Dzhemilev simply said that Crimean Tatars should stand as witnesses because they were discriminated against. Sakharkov later recalled that he got into a fight, together with Bonner, with the KGB outside of the courtroom, which TASS called a brawl. In the end, the court sentenced him to two and a half years in a strict-regime corrective labour colony. Afterwards, writers such as Alexander Nekrich released a public statement called "Dare We Be Silent?", with Lev Kopelev also writing an appeal together with the Chronicle of Current Events and the The New York Review of Books (Reza Baraheni, Pavel Litvinov, Martin Sostre).

==== End of the 1970s ====
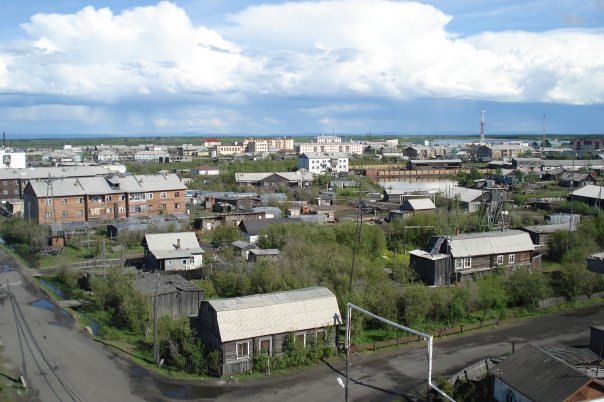
In 1979, Dzhemilev was sent into a four-year exile in the village of Zyryanka (pictured here), which is located within the Sakha Republic (also known as "Yakutia").

After the trial, Dzhemilev was sent to the high-security military complex "Primorsky" in the Far East. Shortly before the end of his sentence, Dzhemilev said he saw "signs" that the authorities were assembling another case against him, and he began a hunger strike. This one only lasted 15 days, as the administration eventually assured him no case was being prepared. He eventually asked to return to Crimea with his parents, which the Bilohirsk committee immediately denied, as he said they were "special settlers", which meant they could not live there. Dzhemilev was then transported to Tashkent on 30 November 1977, and released again on 22 December 1977. Over the next few days following his release, Dzhemilev was placed under special supervision.

His six-month terms of supervision were continuously renewed, and he was forced to remain in Tashkent. He attempted to request to renounce his Soviet citizenship in protest and leave the USSR to live with his relatives in the United States, but only if Crimean Tatars were allowed to move back to Crimea. The government did not reply, and instead, on 8 February 1979, he was again arrested on charges of "malicious violations of the rules of administrative supervision", allegedly due to his request to renounce his citizenship. His new trial was set for 1 March 1979 in Tashkent, which Sakharov again attended, but it as again postponed until 13 March, although this was retracted soon after and the date was moved to 6 March. Nobody was notified of this trial, and Dzhemilev refused to participate in the trial, although it went on regardless of his participation. He was then sentenced to a year and a half of restriction of freedoms alongside a four-year exile to the Ust-Maysky District in the Sakha Republic. On 31 May, his destination was changed to the small village of Zyryanka, also within the Sakha Republic. In exile, he got a job and became good friends with Alexander Podrabinek and Viacheslav Chornovil (both were in exile).

=== 1980s: Release, return to Crimea, and perestroika ===
==== 1983-1986: Release and initial re-arrest ====
In February 1983, Dzhemilev was released from exile. He then managed to go with his wife and child to Saky in Crimea. However, just three days later, the family was expelled from Crimea. He was then placed back under open administrative supervision and was transported around from Krymsk to Obinsk to Novorossiysk. After the Crimean Tatars found out about the family being sent around, they picketed the local police station until they were released in Obinsk. They later decided to return to Yangiyul near Tashkent, where he worked as a locksmith and handyman. In the spring, he also began writing and publishing the samizdat publication "Information Bulletin of the Initiative Group of Crimean Tatars named after Musa Mamut". Less than a year after his release, Dzhemilev was arrested for a sixth time in November 1983. This time, he was accused of writing slanderous postcards to people in New York and of attempting, for provocative purposes, to bury his father in Crimea, and finally of a tape recording of the Japanese NHK station related to the Japanese-Soviet border dispute. He was then kept for several months until February 1983, when the Tashkent Regional Court charged him with "compiling and distributing documents discrediting the Soviet state system" as well as organising mass riots when attempting to bury his father in Crimea. He was sentenced to three years in a maximum-security camp. Afterwards, Dzhemilev was sent to the camp in Uptar in Magadan Oblast.

Right before the end of his term, a new criminal case under Article 188-1 ("malicious disobedience to the lawful demands of the administration of places of detention"). In a closed trial in Uptar in December 1986, he was found guilty and was initially sentenced to three years in prison with a 5-year probation period, but unexpectedly he was released from the courtroom. There are multiple theories as to why he was released, but it is generally agreed that it was a widespread campaign aimed at Mikhail Gorbachev by Soviet dissidents. Some theorise that it was due to the "Sakharov list", a list of political prisoners that Sakharov was close to, which Sakharov showed to Gorbachev in the fall of 1986. Others theorise it was due to a conversation between Ronald Reagan and Gorbachev in the city of Reykjavik, Iceland on 11-12 October 1986. During the meeting, Reagan was said to have agreed to normalising relations between the U.S. and the Soviets if Gorbachev released a list of Soviet political prisoners, which was compiled by the U.S. State Department.

==== 1987-1989: Demonstrations and formation of the OKND ====
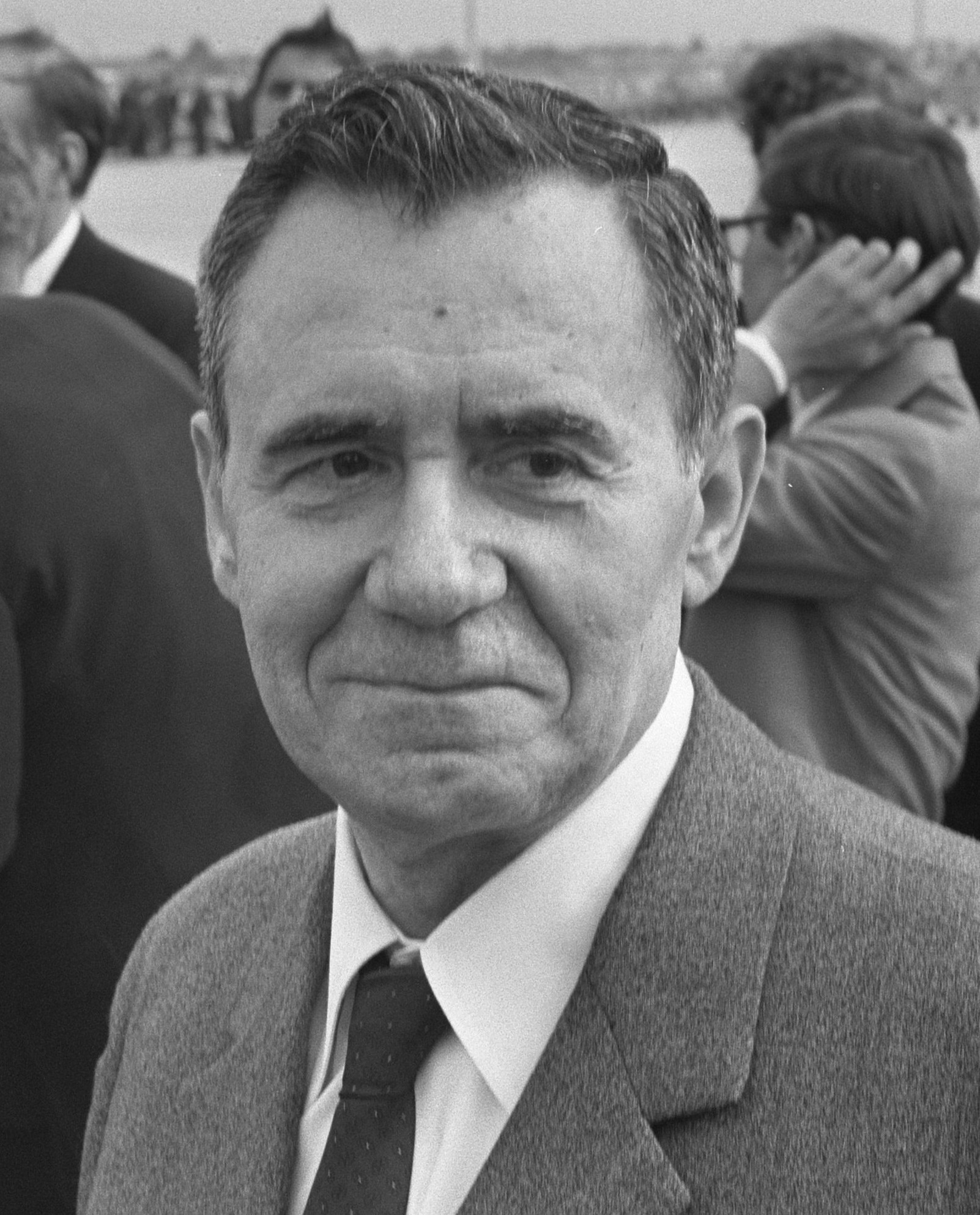
After the massive demonstrations in the Red Square of Moscow in the summer of 1987, the Gromyko Commission was created to address the "Tatar Problem", led by the Minister of Foreign Affairs, Andrei Gromyko (pictured here). The commission largely rejected the Crimean Tatars arguments, including the right to return and the restoration of the Crimean ASSR.

Dzhemilev later recalled that the Crimean Tatar movement was split into four at the time of his return during perestroika, and that afterwards he tried to form a unified congress with all the group leaders except Yuri Osmanov, whom he called "ultra-communist". Thus, in April 1987, Dzhemilev founded the "First All-Union Congress of Activists of the Crimean Tatar National Movement" in Tashkent. The congress then wrote an appeal to Gorbachev, asking to meet him, or a delegation would come to Moscow itself. He also began publishing the semi-legal monthly bulletin of the National Movement of the Crimean Tatars. In the summer of 1987, the Crimean Tatar delegates arrived en masse in Moscow to stage their promised demonstration, and began visiting the editorial offices of television stations, newspapers, organisations, and magazines about their campaign. Dzhemilev was not at the protests because he was not allowed to leave Tashkent and was still under supervision, but he supported the demonstration from the city and advised the Crimean Tatars in Moscow on their next steps. The first all-out demonstrations took place throughout the summer of 1987 in the Red Square of Moscow, with about 2,000 people, with help from Alexander Lavut. Dzhemilev claimed that this was the first time the authorities saw such mass demonstrations that were hard-line against Communism, with slogans including "Homeland or Death". After the delegation returned back, Dzhemilev wrote the samizdat brochure "Crimean Tatars in Moscow. Summer of 1987", which recorded the events and was reprinted in Crimean Tatar journals under Chubarov.

The delegation eventually got some recognition from Andrei Gromyko, marking a turning point with the formation of the Gromyko Commission, the first state commission in the USSR to address "the Tatar problem". Throughout the following months, the commission worked, but a TASS statement that followed from it, in which the government said the Crimean Tatars had burned Communists and partisans in ovens and conducted an anti-Soviet campaign, heavily angered the movement. The Gromyko Commission eventually ruled against the Crimean Tatars' demands, including the right to a return and the restoration of the Crimean ASSR, which led to heavily suppressed rallies and general strikes. Afterwards, in May 1989, the previous congress decided to form a new, more radical breakaway nationwide organisation: the Organisation of the Crimean Tatar National Movement (OKND). Dzhemilev was immediately elected the OKND's chairman, with Chubarov as his deputy. The OKND was formed in contrast to Osmanov's National Movement of Crimean Tatars (NDKT), with the OKND advocating for a more radical approach of the full return to Crimea, restoring national statehood, and the end of the Soviet Union. The NDKT was far less radical, only wanting the right to return and the restoration of the Crimean ASSR, while still adhering to Leninst principles.

==== 1989-1991: Return to Crimea and the Mejlis ====
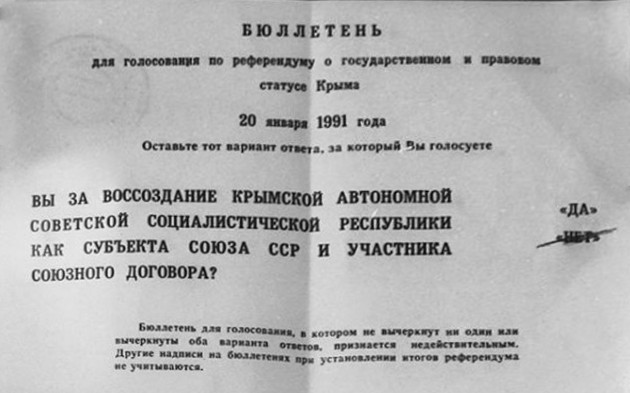
A ballot paper for the 1991 Crimean autonomy referendum, which was held in January 1991, shortly before the collapse of the Soviet Union. Dzhemilev ordered the OKND to boycott it.

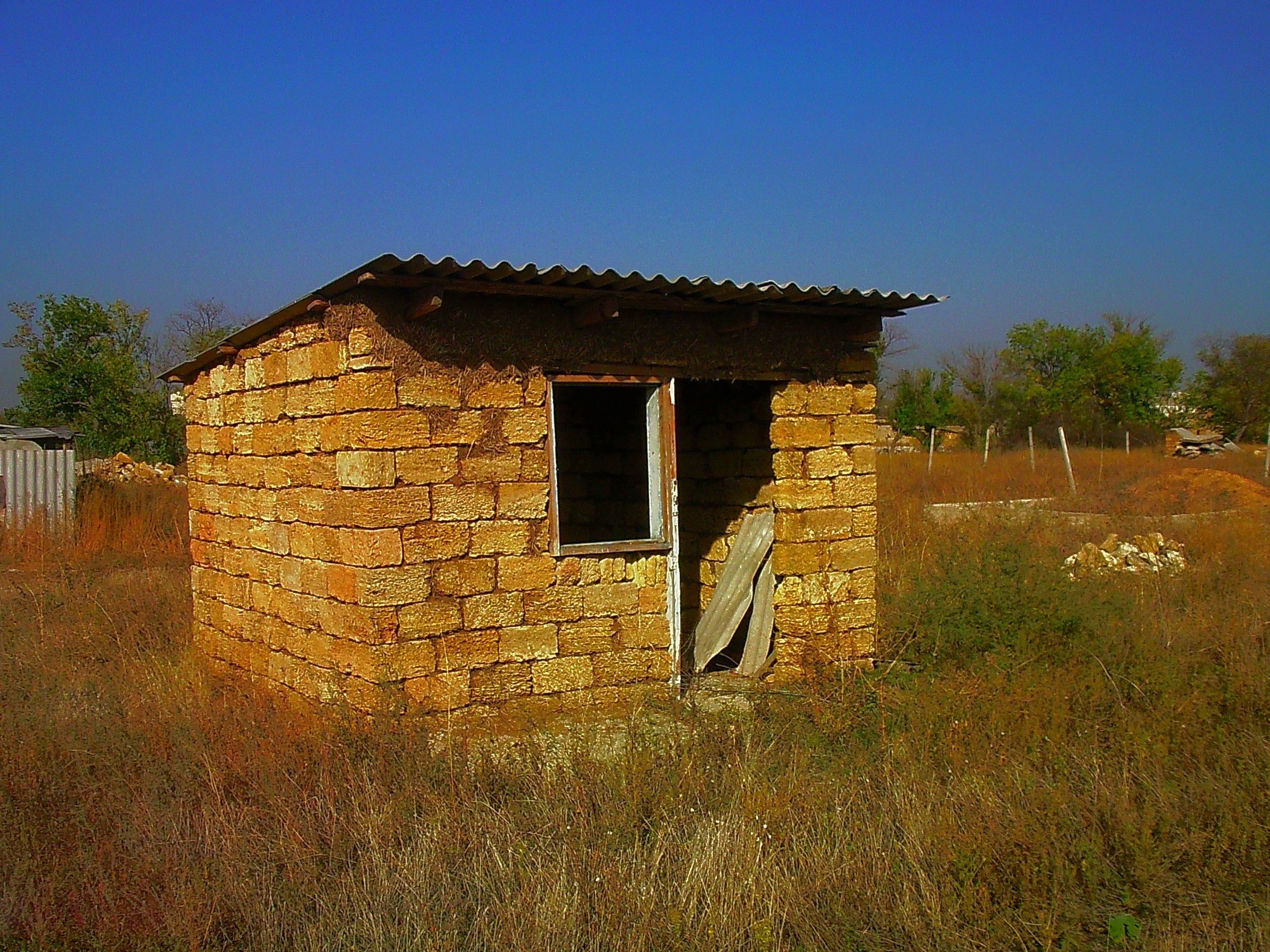
Dzhemilev and the OKND encouraged the practice of squatting (depicted here in Simferopol) in response to the Soviet government not giving out many land grants to returnee Crimean Tatars.

In connection with his election as chairman of the OKND, Dzhemilev was finally allowed to permanently resettle in Crimea, specifically within the city of Bakhchysarai (the former capital of the Crimean Khanate). During this late Soviet period with the OKND, Dzhemilev primarily focused on the Crimean Tatar repatriation and land reclamation. According to Dzhemilev, during this time, land and dacha plots were being rapidly given to Russians before Crimea "became Tatar", with Crimeans protesting and occupying vacant plots, which led to riots. Dzhemilev encouraged squatting and occupying vacant plots, as he said Crimean Tatars should begin occupying land on their own. After the authorities eventually legalised some land reclamation, the OKND began identifying empty land to give to families, alongside constructing new Crimean Tatar schools and mosques. They also built what were known as "tent settlements" under one of the co-founders of the OKND, Shinaver Kadyrov. After the announcement of the 1991 Crimean autonomy referendum, Dzhemilev confirmed that the OKND would denounce and boycott the referendum, which they regarded as predetermined and as a violation of the rights of Crimean Tatars. Dzhemilev also saw the plan as increasing the power of the Russian language in Crimea, and that it would excerpt broad Soviet power. It was eventually passed regardless, re-creating the Crimean ASSR, this time within the Ukrainian SSR (due to the earlier 1954 transfer of Crimea). In response, Dzhemilev said he regretted that the Ukrainian SSR government accepted the arrangement and said the Tatars would form their own Qurultay. He also said that Ukraine was no more willing to solve their problems than Russia or Simferopol.

The Kurultai was eventually created, per his promise, with representatives being elected from across Crimea; delegates were chosen at 1 person per 1,000 Crimean Tatars. A second Qurultay/Kurultai congress (Note: It was technically the first, although Dzhemilev called it the second because of the one in 1917 under Noman Chelebijihan.) was opened in June 1991, thus creating the Mejlis of the Crimean Tatar People. The Qurultay adopted the "Declaration of National Sovereignty" unanimously, which said: Crimea is the Crimean Tatars' national territory, that they have the right to self-determination, and that they rejected the Crimean ASSR established in January. During the Qurultay, Dzhemilev was elected as the chairman of the Mejlis, with the Mejlis being determined to include a council of 33 people, and was the highest representative body of the Crimean Tatars.

== Politics in Ukraine ==
=== 1990s ===
==== 1991: Independence of Ukraine ====
Despite past misgivings, when Ukraine declared independence in August 1991, Dzhemilev and his Crimean Tatars heavily supported the country. There were many reasons why, but the OSCE identified that they feared siding with Crimean Tatars who were Russian unionists, that they did not want separation, that Russia had been the main perpetrator of the deportations, and that Ukrainian nationalists had generally backed the Crimean Tatars previously. The Mejlis later said they were the only organisation that provided Crimean support for Ukrainian independence, although Ukraine did not acknowledge this due to fears during the ongoing border dispute with Russian separatists. In November 1991, a special session of the Qurultay that was called affirmed their support for Ukraine becoming an independent, democratic state, and the Qurultay under Dzhemilev urged Crimean Tatars to vote "yes" on the upcoming December independence referendum. They also urged people to back a bloc against Leonid Kravchuk for the upcoming 1991 Ukrainian presidential election. Allworth claims that the Crimean Tatars did show up to the referendum, and all while Crimea as a whole only narrowly backed independence, the Crimean Tatars were heavily in support of it. Following Ukrainian independence, the Mejlis in December 1991 drafted a constitution for the Autonomous Republic of Crimea, which would provide for a dual power with the Mejlis holding the upper house of the autonomous parliament in Crimea, and thus would also hold a veto. However, the authorities in Crimea dismissed all of their demands soon after, only offering over-representation for Crimean Tatars in the planned 1994 Crimean parliamentary election.

==== 1992-1994: Struggling Crimean government, representation ====
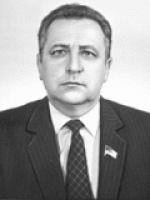
Despite past conflicts with Mykola Bahrov (pictured here), Dzhemilev led the Mejlis in backing him in the 1994 Crimean presidential election, over fears of separatism and closer ties to Russia that was espoused by Yuriy Meshkov. Meshkov would end up winning.

In the 1994 parliamentary elections of Crimea, the Mejlis were given a set quota of 14 seats of the 100 after protests and negotiations. This was not renewed for the 1998 elections, and the Mejlis would not participate in Crimean parliamentary elections against until 2006.

However, the Crimean authorities, dissatisfied with the Ukrainian government's actions, declared the Republic of Crimea in May 1992, which would be a sovereign state pending a proposed referendum slated for August 1992. However, soon after, the Crimeans and Ukraine reached a compromise in which they affirmed Crimea was still part of Ukraine, but that they still wanted further federalisation, which Ukraine rejected. Dzhemilev and the Mejlis in general did not welcome the Crimean government's moves, with Dzhemilev saying that the separatist route was an obstacle to the repatration of Crimean Tatars, and they declared they would never accept the result of the proposed referendum given that it ignored the rights of Crimean Tatars to self-determination. Dzhemilev instead wanted what the Ukrainian wanted, which was Crimea being an autonomous region within Ukraine, and the affirmation that the Mejlis were the only representative body of the Crimean Tatars. With Crimea continuing to stray away from Ukraine regardless, the authorities began putting pressure on squatting, which Dzhemilev had earlier approved. In March 1993, the Crimean authorities under Mykola Bahrov finally reached out for a compromise, and he offered that the Qurultay would occupy a set quota of 14 of the 98 seats of the Supreme Council of Crimea, which the Qurultay rejected in July 1993, as they wanted a third of the seats, although they lessened this to 22 plus 6 for other indigenous peoples. The Crimean authorities rejected this alltogether, which triggered large Crimean Tatar protests, with threatened pickets and blockades. Under pressure, the authorities adopted a lesser 14 seats for Crimean Tatars and 4 for other deported peoples, but that it would only last for a single election cycle. However, Dzhemilev decided not to protest this and was generally described as "lukewarm", compared to the OKND, which was now led by Rejep Khairedinov, which Allworth attributes to Dzhemilev's fears that a radical faction would split off, and the delegates of the Meljis agreed to participate in the snap upcoming elections.

However, most of the Crimean Tatars were still angered at the idea of the upcoming 1994 Crimean presidential election, which was contrary to the 1991 draft constitution of the Mejlis and was also exclusive to Crimean Tatars, as residents needed to have lived in Crimea for 10 years to vote in the election. Under Dzhemilev, the Mejlis eventually decided to recommend that Crimean Tatars boycott the election, however they reversed this shortly after over fears of the rising separatist "Russia Bloc" under Yuriy Meshkov and they backed Bahrov, who Dzhemilev saw as the lesser of two evils. They still affirmed that this did not amount to recognising the Crimean presidency, though. Although over 90% of Crimean Tatars followed Dzhemilev's instructions, Meshkov still won the presidency, which the Tatars greatly feared as Meshkov called for an independent Crimea with close ties to Russia, the Black Sea Fleet be given entirely to Russia, and a referendum on Crimea's status. Dzhemilev said he would not recognise Meshkov as president unless he agreed to the earlier quotas, which Meshkov immediately refused, and he began initiating the 1994 Crimean referendum and the 1994 Crimean parliamentary election. For the parliamentary elections, the Qurultay demanded the recognition of the Mejlis as the representatives of the Crimean Tatars, national statehood, and Russian acknowledgement of their role in the deportations. In the end, the Mejlis won 14 seats, which although not a majority gave the Mejlis enough of a foothold to ask Ukraine for more assistance. After the elections, Dzhemilev talked with the Turkish president, Süleyman Demirel, about help in constructing homes for Crimean Tatars. Eventually, in September 1995, the Ukrainian government interfered in the Crimean situation, removing Meshkov and restoring the Autonomous Republic of Crimea. Afterwards, the new Crimean government, which was dominated by the Communist Party of Ukraine, refused to renew the Crimean Tatar quota for the upcoming 1998 Crimean parliamentary election leading to Tatars having no representation in the parliament.

==== 1998-2000: First election to the Verkhovna Rada, legalisation ====
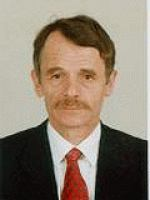
Dzhemilev in his first term in the Verkhovna Rada in 1998.

During the 1998 Ukrainian parliamentary elections, Dzhemilev decided to finally enter national politics, joining the party list of the People's Movement of Ukraine (Rukh), which was led by his old friend during his time in Yakutia in the 1970s, Chornovil. He was placed No. 9 on their party list, and he was thus successfully elected for the first time to the Verkhovna Rada. His high placement on the list led Crimean Tatars to vote for Rukh en masse, with Dzhemilev forming a two-man lobby of Crimean Tatars with Chubarov, who was also elected from Rukh. When Dzhemilev actually entered the Rada, he remained affiliated with Rukh, and after Yuriy Kostenko split his faction, the Ukrainian People's Party, off shortly before Chornovil's death, he remained. Dzhemilev was also elected to the Verkhovna Rada Committee on Human Rights, National Minorities, and Interethnic Relations.

Immediately after the elections in 1998, Dzhemilev met with Ukrainian president Leonid Kuchma, who offered a scheme to ensure Crimean Tatars could be represented again in the Crimean parliament through supplementary elections, and to establish a high-level working group to assist with the resettlement process. Kuchma would later keep true to his promise, and on 18 May 1999, issued a decree officially establishing the "Council of Representatives of the Crimean Tatar People", which was an organisation under the president and acted as a consultative and advisory body, with Dzhemilev as its head. Kuchma thus indirectly legalised the Mejlis for the first time and established an official dialogue. The 1999 decree was mostly viewed as a stopgap to the ongoing protests in Crimea over the 1944 deportation. In addition to the nationwide agreement, Serhiy Kunitsyn, the then Prime Minister of Crimea, also met with Dzhemilev soon after and agreed to concessions that Crimean Tatars could own land and open their own schools, while also being given the right to set up a council representing their interests. In response, Leonid Grach, the Chairman of the Supreme Council of Crimea, set up a counterweight to the Mejlis called the Council of Aksakals, although it did not take off.

=== 2000s ===
==== 2000-2004: Government talks, Kuchma ====
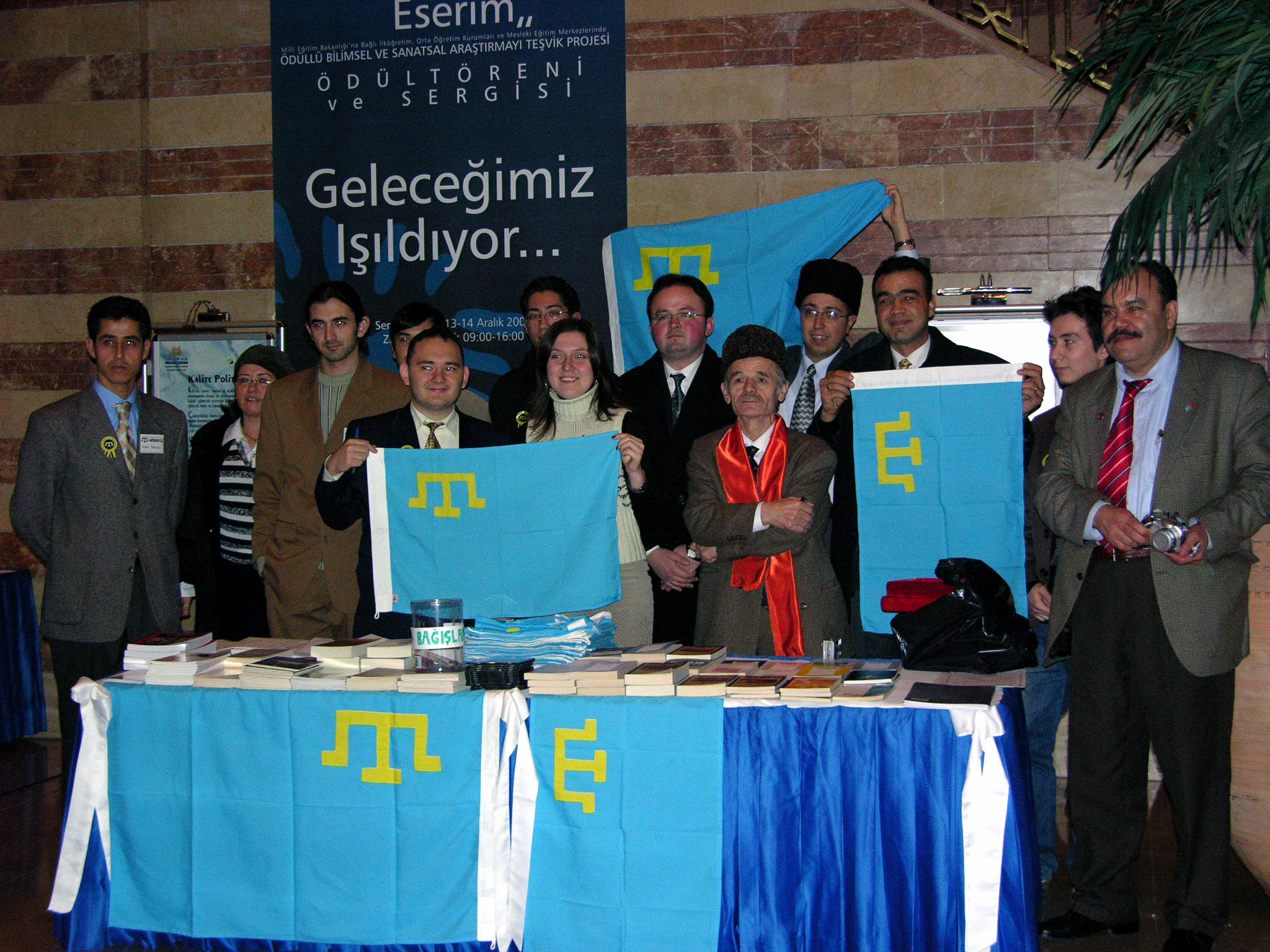
Dzhemilev (in the orange scarf) during a meeting with other Crimean Tatar activists in 2004.

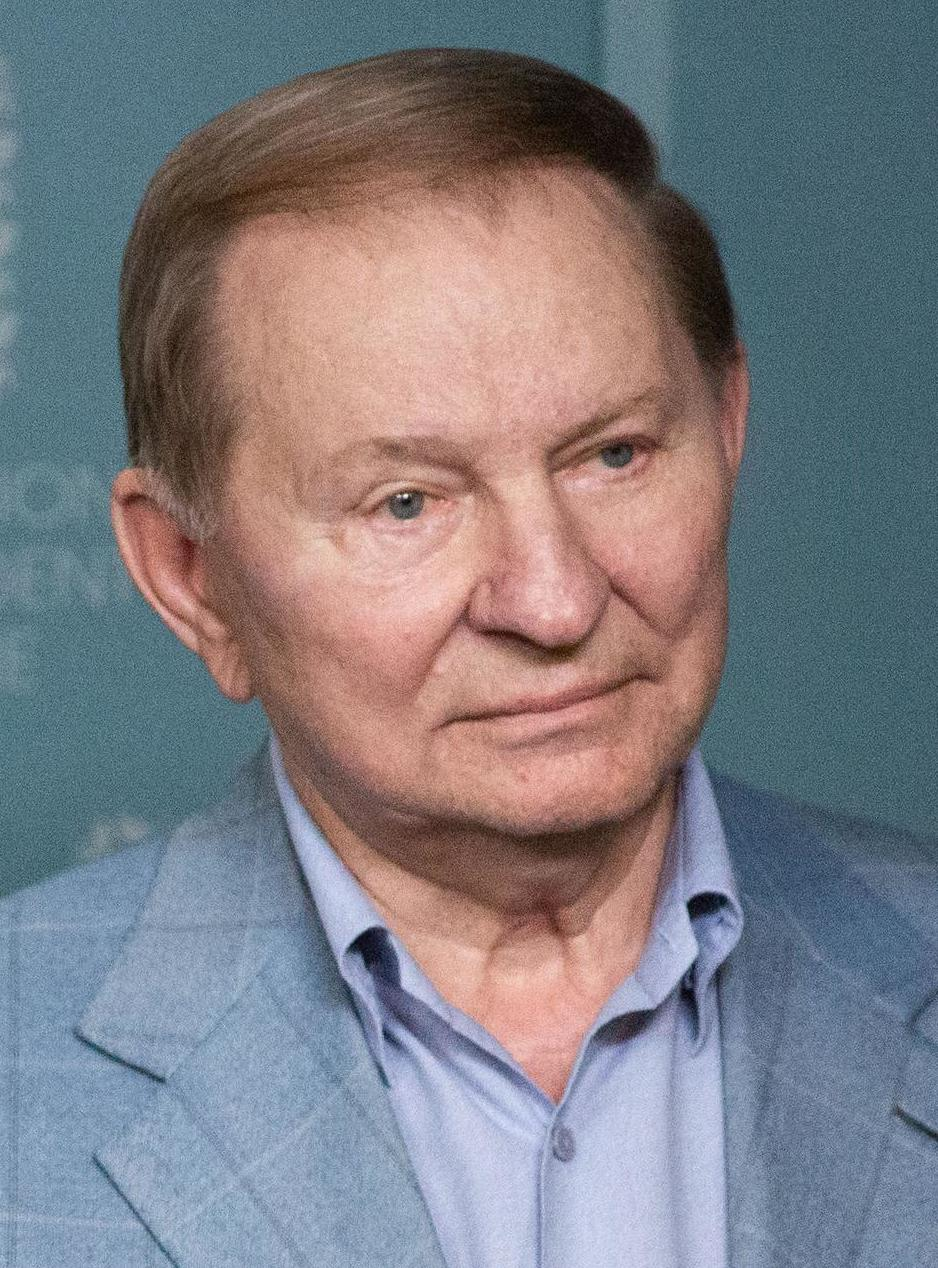
Although Dzhemilev's relations with Ukrainian president Leonid Kuchma (pictured here) gradually improved post-1998, they sharply worsened post-2003, and Dzhemilev eventually backed Viktor Yushchenko, while claiming that Kuchma tried to make Yushchenko seem like the candidate of an "extremist" Tatar community.

With the creation of the council in 1999, Dzhemilev began leading it while still a member of the Verkhovna Rada, which, from the period of 1999 to 2004, produced almost 60 presidential instructions and proposals on the situation. After Kuchma stepped down as President of Ukraine, with Viktor Yushchenko succeeding him following the events of the Orange Revolution, the council did not meet again from the period of 2004 to 2009. One of the more successful measures to come out of the council was in August 2000, when Dzhemilev signed a plan on joint measures on the Crimean Tatars' socioeconomic problems with the presidential representative of Ukraine to Crimea, Anatoliy Korniychuk. Grach, who was still the Chairman of the Supreme Council of Crimea, also rejected this plan. The following year, in October 2001, Dzhemilev publicly released his opinion, as an Islamic leader, that the War in Afghanistan was justified in response to 9/11. The following year, in 2002, Dzhemilev was re-elected to the Verkhovna Rada during the 2002 Ukrainian parliamentary elections, this time with the Our Ukraine Bloc, on which he was placed No. 28. Upon joining the Rada, Dzhemilev again sat on the Committee on Human Rights, National Minorities and Interethnic Relations. The end of 2002 was marked by repeated fights between Russians and Crimean Tatars in Crimea, with Dzhemilev accusing the Russians of trying to provoke them. Nevertheless, he condemned the Moscow theater hostage crisis, while at the same time also condemning the Russian actions in the Second Chechen War. Regarding Chechnya, he offered the Mejlis to act as a mediator in the conflict, and called for talks with the de facto Chechen president Maskhadov. With the war on terror rising, Dzhemilev continued his previous opinions, calling the Iraq War justified, which led the Hizb ut-Tahrir to deliver jihad leaflets to Dzhemilev in March 2003. Six years later, in 2009, Dzhemilev admitted that he regretted agreeing with the war, but he still condemned the President of Iraq, Saddam Hussein, and his actions. During that same year, his relations with Kuchma soured, as he said that Russification was rapidly overcoming Crimea, even more so than in exile, with the Crimeans living in poor housing.

In January 2004, Dzhemilev and the Mejlis requested a commission in the Verkhovna Rada to restore historical Crimean place names from before 1944. Immediately afterwards, riots once again broke out in Crimea after police in Sudak fired at the Tatars when they tried to free Ismet Saliev, whom Dzhemilev said was attacked by 11 Russian-speaking men, including a local official. Serhiy Kunitsyn immediately responded, calling it a provocation and accusing the Mejlis of acting "too aggressively", to which Dzhemilev immediately responded, saying that Russian nationalists were spreading leaflets to rise against Tatars. With his relations with Kuchma reaching a low point, Dzhemilev backed Viktor Yushchenko, and said that Kuchma was trying to portray Yushchenko as a candidate of an "extremist" Tatar community. Over the following months, tensions further worsened between Dzhemilev and the government after he called for proportional representation and the official status of the Crimean Tatar language, as the Verkhovna Rada did consider it and drafted it but did not pass it. In response, Dzhemilev said the government was staging political provocations, and then a few months later he also said that Russian organisations and the Russian government were also trying to heighten the fear of Tatars. He and the Crimean Tatars eventually showed up to the Orange Revolution in late 2004 in support of Yushchenko, although his wife Safinar later commented that they were disappointed when Yushchenko seemed to know little about the Crimean Tatar problems. Thus, Dzhemilev decided to move from Yushchenko's Our Ukraine faction back to Rukh in September 2005.

==== 2005-2010: Yushchenko era, assassination plot ====
In 2009, the Ukrainian government revealed an assasination plot against Dzhemilev by the Egyptian jihadist group Takfir wal-Hijra (flag pictured here), which was foiled. It was reported the group had issued a fatwa against Dzhemilev, although Dzhemilev rejected this, and claimed that the Russian Federal Security Service (FSB) was behind the plot.

In May 2005, he eventually struck a deal with Yushchenko's Prime Minister of Crimea, Anatoliy Matviyenko, to allow greater regional representation, with Matviyenko agreeing to give the Tatars two ministries, a deputy prime minister position, and a Crimean Tatar-language television channel after Dzhemilev led boycotts. In turn, he eventually rejoined Our Ukraine, and was elected from its party list for the 2006 Ukrainian parliamentary elections (he was placed No. 45). With his relations with the government improving, he became Chairman of the Subcommittee of the Committee on Human Rights, National Minorities, and Interethnic Relations. He resigned early from the 2006 convocation, on 15 June 2007, with Dzhemilev also confirming he had tried to resign from the Qurultay but was refused. He said he wished to hand over the leadership in 2007. However, he eventually abandoned these plans and during the snap 2007 Ukrainian parliamentary elections, he was re-elected to the Verkhovna Rada on the NUNS list at No. 27. He was given a position in power in the Rada, becoming Chairman of the Subcommittee on Indigenous Issues, National Minorities, Ethnic Groups and Deported Peoples in 2008.

The following year, on 23 October 2009, Dzhemilev said he was informed by the Security Service of Ukraine (SBU) of a plot against him. Due to this, he met with the Minister of Interior, Yuriy Lutsenko, who declined to add extra security for Dzhemilev, saying that the police could hardly stop such an act and said that Mejlis should be used as guards instead. On 27 October, Lutsenko announced in a press briefing that members of the radical Islamist group Takfir wal-Hijra were arrested on plans to assassinate him. Lutsenko also said that the group had issued a fatwa against him, although Dzhemilev later refused the group's involvement, saying he believed the Russian Federal Security Service (FSB) was more likely to be behind it, although Hennadiy Moskal said there was no "Russian trace". Later on in November a criminal case was opened after the Islamist group under Article 255, leading to the arrest of five members, although its ringleaders, nicknamed the "Red Arab", escaped. Later that year, Dzhemilev said that he no longer believed in Yushchenko, as he said that Yushchenko did not keep his campaign promises about NATO, the Black Sea Fleet, and the EU, and that he would prefer to ask all the candidates about that. He confirmed that he backed NATO membership for Ukraine as the safest way to avoid a repeat of the 2008 Russo-Georgian War and that he also backed European Union integration as a way to back minority rights, and confirmed that talks of Crimean Tatar separatism were baseless.

=== 2010s ===
==== Early 2010s: Downward relations, stepping down ====
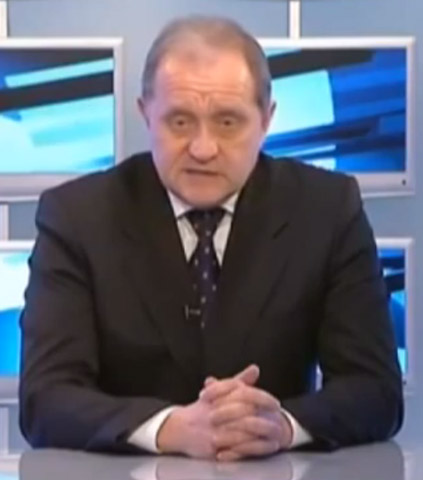
During Anatolii Mohyliov's (pictured here) time as Minister of Internal Affairs and Prime Minister of Crimea under Viktor Yanukovych, Dzhemilev intensely opposed him, leading to worsening relations with the government. Dzhemilev accused of him numerous Tatarphobic statements.

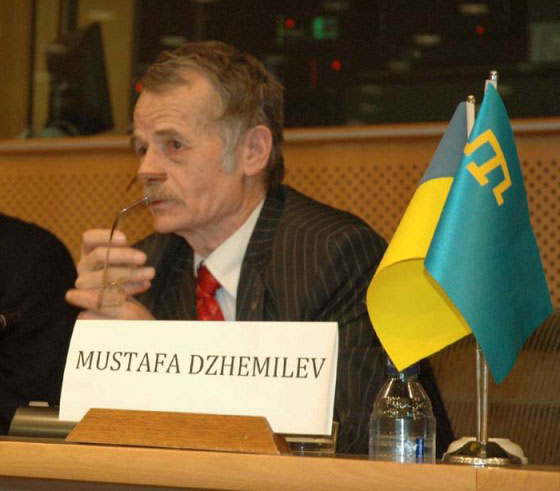
Dzhmeilev in 2010.

In early 2010, the Mejlis under Dzhemilev asked for a case to be opened after the new Minister of Internal Affairs, Anatolii Mohyliov, who was appointed by Viktor Yanukovych. Dzhemilev said he had made numerous past Tatarphobic statements, including, but not limited to, repeating claims that Tatars collaborated with Hitler and that they were inciting a "Kosovo scenario" in Crimea. During a European Parliament hearing on 17 March 2010, Dzhemilev said that under Yanukovych, pro-Russian separatist discourse was rising, and that the Mejlis were being targeted because they opposed the renewal of the Russian Black Sea Fleet in Sevastopol. With relations worsening, Yanukovych met with Dzhemilev in April 2010 alongside Chubarov and Yanukovych's aide, Serhiy Lyovochkin. During this meeting, Yanukovych said he would solve Crimean Tatar problems quickly, but he requested that Dzhemilev and the Mejlis back his Party of Regions over the opposition. Dzhemilev rejected this, saying a Qurultay needed to happen, and that either way most Crimean Tatars favoured Euroatlanticism over pro-Russian politics. Indeed, a few days later, he expressed his dissatisfaction at the renewal of the Russian Black Sea fleet lease in Crimea until 2042, when he said it was affecting the territorial integrity of Ukraine and called it a breach of the Ukrainian constitution.

It was later alleged that Yanukovych retaliated by changing the presidential "Council of Representatives of the Crimean Tatar People", cutting its members to 15, of which only 7 were Mejlis, after Yanukovych threatened them and said that the Mejlis were refusing to take part. In turn, some Mejlis started boycotting a meeting with Yanukovych, with Dzhemilev claiming that Yanukovych intended to split the community and try to get them to support the little-followed pro-Russian organisation Milliy Fırqa under Vasvi Abduraimov. After the Qurultay met in August 2010, they agreed that discriminatory policies by the government had sharply risen since the 2010 presidential election, with fewer Crimean Tatars being placed in the government, and they wrote an appeal to Yanukovych to return more Crimean Tatar delegates to the council. They threatened to not participate in the council otherwise, which would make it not be able to function.

After Mohyliov was appointed Prime Minister of Crimea by Yanukovych in late 2011, Dzhemilev sharply criticised the decision and said that it would fuel interethnic tensions, with his justifications including his past statements in support of the 1944 deportations and the police under him shooting at unarmed people in Ai-Petri. Around that same time, Dzhemilev said he intended to resign as Chairman of the Mejlis, saying he was too old and someone younger needed to take over, after his two previous attempts had failed, and said he would not participate in the Qurultay and thus leave politics. In preparation for his eventual departure, he negotiated with the pro-European parties for the 2012 Ukrainian parliamentary elections, mainly with Front for Change and UDAR (Rukh had by this point uncertain chances of getting back into parliament). After the Qurultay met in July 2012, Dzhemilev said that both the decisions on who the new chairman would be and who they should support in elections be held together.

However, the Mejlis said they would delay the chairmanship question until at least the end of 2012, and they encouraged Dzhemilev and Chubarov to run again in the elections as they were considered "passable". Shortly thereafter, Dzhemilev signed a statement with Arseniy Yatsenyuk and Oleksandr Turchynov, in which he pledged the Mejlis would cooperate with Batkivshchyna, with Batkivshchyna placing him 12th on their party list. Dzhemilev then said he would leave the chairmanship of the Mejlis, and confirmed he would not stand in the Qurultay again. In October, when the Qurultay was held without him, Chubarov was narrowly elected to replace him as chairman, beating Remzi Ilyasov, the leader of Qurultai-Rukh, an organisation mainly aimed at regional representation in the Crimean parliament.

==== 2014: Russian annexation of Crimea ====
Dzhemilev in March 2014 with Mintimer Shaimiev, the former Head of the Republic of Tatarstan, discussing the situation in Crimea.

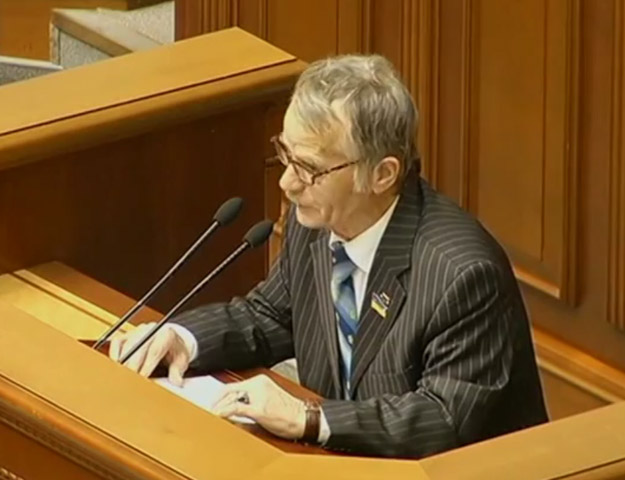
Dzhemilev addressing the Verkhovna Rada on 20 March 2014.

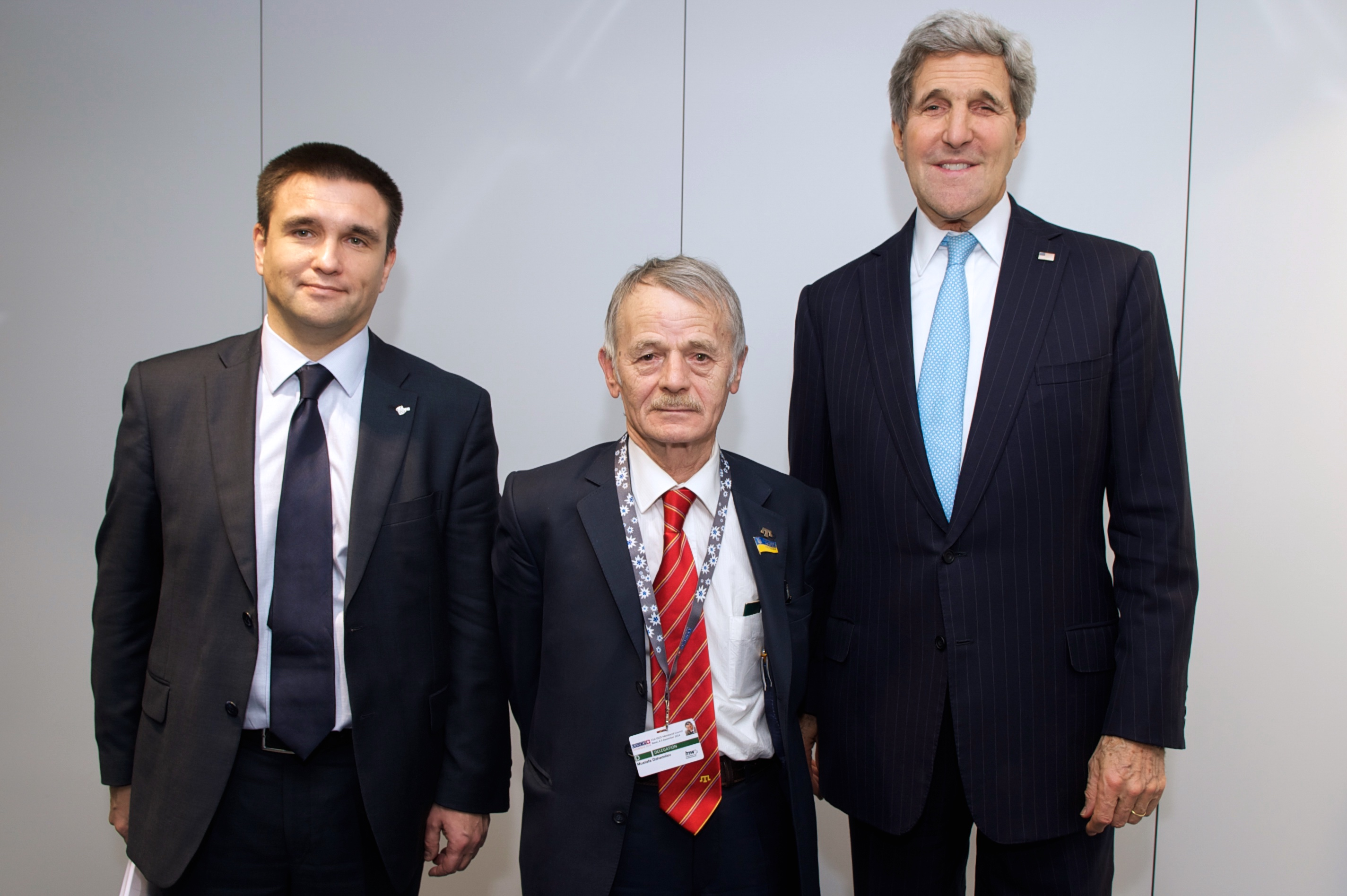
Dzhemilev (middle) during a meeting with the OSCE council in December 2014. To his left is Pavlo Klimkin, to his right is U.S. Secretary of State John Kerry.

Shortly before the Russians entered Crimea in February 2014, Dzhemilev alleged that a Russian Federal Security Service (FSB) figure who was based in Sevastopol contacted him, asking Dzhemilev to meet him in Yalta, and that Russian President Vladimir Putin wanted to talk to him. Dzhemilev said he declined the offer, instead saying that Putin himself should come and meet with the Crimean Tatar leadership. After Russia actually invaded Crimea through Russian special forces without insignia, Dzhemilev said the Mejlis would not negotiate with them or the new pro-Russian government after they captured the Crimean parliament. Dzhemilev said confirmed Crimean Tatar detachments were being formed to resist the occupation, using force if necessary, and said that there were talks with the main Ukrainian government to get them weapons. In a retrospective analysis, Dzhemilev later admitted that not much could be done because of scenarios Russia had already counted, and the fact that Crimean units were already surrendering en masse. Dzhemilev, who was in Ankara, Turkey, at the time of the announcement of the disputed 2014 Crimean status referendum, said that radical groups would likely fight the Russian government and that the Mejlis would too. However, he stopped short and said he did not support any jihad, but at the same time said the Crimean Tatars would not accept a "puppet government". Later that same day, the Crimean parliament passed a new resolution that promised making the Crimean Tatar language official status in Crimea, which Dzhemilev immediately dismissed as a bribe.

The following day, 12 March, he went to the Russian capital of Moscow to meet with Russian officials. There he met with the former President of Tatarstan, Mintimer Shaimiyev, and spoke by phone with Putin, who was still in Sochi. During the call with Putin, Dzhemilev said he told him that the referendum was illegitimate, and that he would lead the Crimean Tatars in boycotting it, and that it was a direct breach of the Budapest Memorandum (where Russia and Ukraine, among others, agreed to provide security assurances to each other). He also said Russia was making a huge mistake in destroying relations with Ukraine, which he called a fraternal country, and said disputes should instead be negotiated. In response, Putin blamed the "Banderites" in Kyiv, said that Yanukovych's removal was illegal, and said he would do more for Crimean Tatars than Ukraine ever had. After the call, Dzhemilev, per his earlier statements, led a Crimean Tatar boycott of the referendum, which was held on 16 March. After the preliminary results of the referendum were announced, he held a joint press conference with the Turkish foreign minister Ahmet Davutoğlu. Dzhemilev declared that the Mejlis had a stance identical to Turkey in considering the referendum illegal and claimed that the results were manipulated by Russia.

Days later, on 20 March, he addressed the entire Verkhovna Rada after Iryna Herashchenko asked him to do so following Russia annexing Crimea two days earlier due to the results of the disputed referendum. During this speech, he said he believed in Petro Poroshenko's statements, where he said that Ukraine would still continue to guarantee the rights off Crimean Tatars, and said that they were enduring the pressure of an occupying horde. In the statements, he also urged more rights for Crimean Tatars, which could give Ukraine a better image internationally, and said that deputies needed to act after multiple deputies based in Crimea backed the annexation and resigned. Later that day, the Rada accepted his proposed bill, which recognised the Mejlis as the Qurultay's executive body, and they backed the UN Declaration on the Rights of Indigenous Peoples. Over the following weeks, Dzhemilev led the Mejlis in hardly participating in the new Crimean government, although he said he was worried that the Crimean Tatars being seen as too pragmatic would be seen as collaboration by Ukraine.

In late March, he took part as a representative in a UN Security Council meeting that was called in an emergency, which Russia had boycotted, during which time he asked for UN peacekeepers to intervene in the situation, although it would likely not happen. He also said that international sanctions against Russia were not helping much, and that he did not believe in Russia's argument that the annexation was justified because the Crimean people had the right to "self-determination". In an address to the Carnegie Centre a few days later, he said he believed that the Crimean Tatars' future lay only in Ukraine, and he called for further sanctions against Russia, and said that Russia would soon stage provocations against the Crimean Tatars. Over the following months, with the 2014 Ukrainian presidential election happening, where Poroshenko was elected president, Dzhemilev started criticising the compromises some Mejlis had made more sharply, and he began consolidating against cooperation after Lenur Islyamov was ousted as Deputy Chairman of the Council of Ministers of the new Republic of Crimea. Finally, in July, the Mejlis agreed in an emergency session in Henichesk to withdraw all Mejlis representation from the Crimean government and to work only in Ukrainian-controlled territory. Dzhemilev later claimed that Putin contacted him once again, offering to release his son and allow him entry to Crimea again, but he said he refused, ending any talks with the Russian government.

==== Late 2010s: Commissioner, fallout of annexation ====
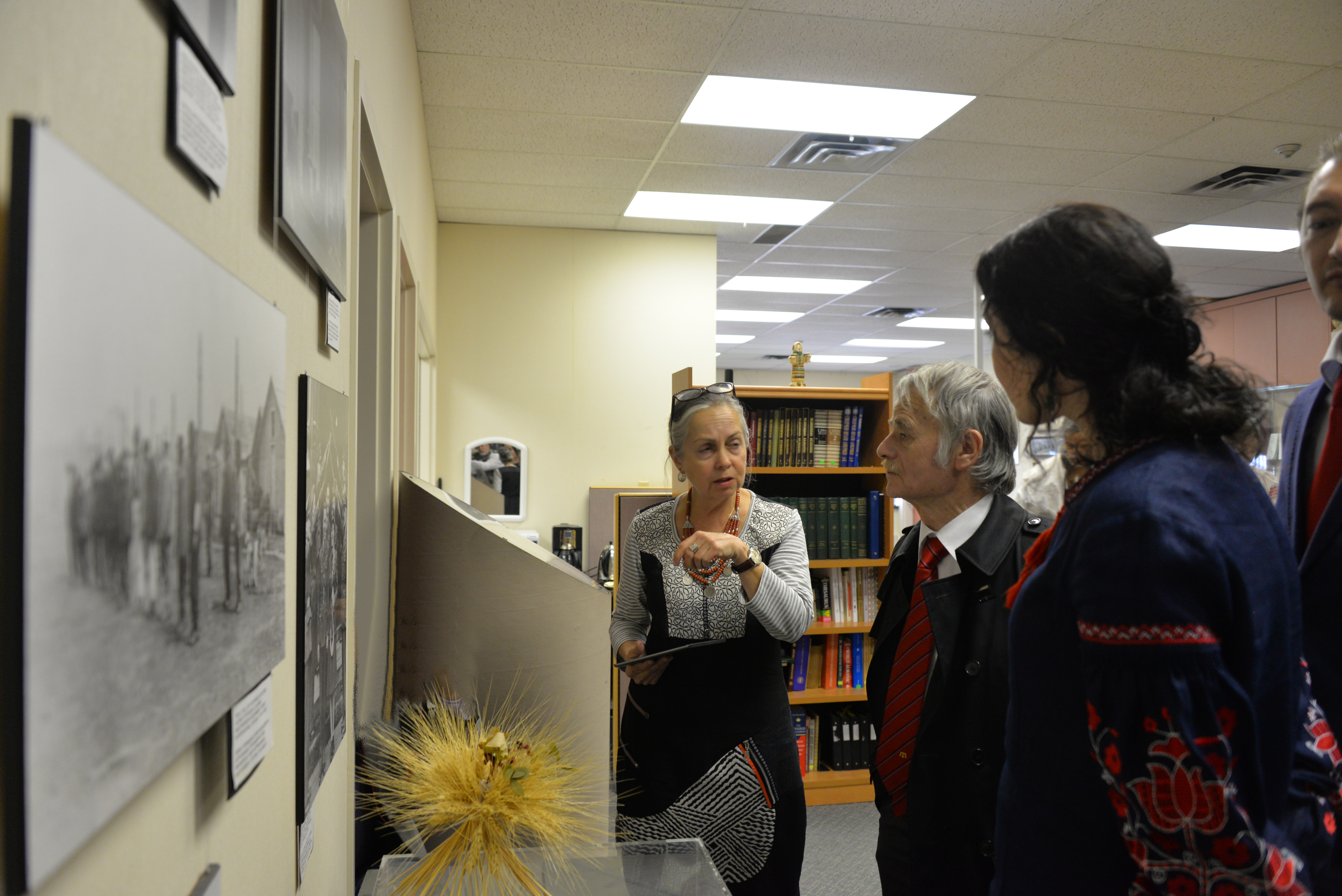
Dzhemilev during a visit to the Ukrainian-Canadian Research and Documentation Centre in 2016.

On 20 August 2014, Poroshenko appointed Dzhemilev as the newly created Commissioner of the President of Ukraine for Crimean Tatar Affairs. The commissioner was said to be responsible for ensuring the Crimean Tatars' rights as an indigenous people of Ukraine. A few months later, in November, he was re-elected to the snap 2014 Ukrainian parliamentary election, after being placed on the Petro Poroshenko Bloc at No. 5. Like with previous convocations, he was placed on the Committee on Human Rights, National Minorities and Interethnic Relations. Over the following year, he would focus on the fate of Crimea, although in 2015 he asked Nadiya Savchenko to end her hunger strike, as Sakharov had in 1976, saying Russia would not act humanely. Regarding the fate of Crimean Tatars still in Crimea, he said in early 2015 that they lived in a state of fear with constant searches and near-zero democratic freedom, and said this was part of Russia's plan to create a group of Crimean Tatars loyal to Russia. After Russia banned the annual deportation memorial rally, which was traditionally held in May in Simferopol, Dzhemilev said he would move the rally to Kyiv.

Late that year, Chubarov and Dzhemilev confirmed activists were blocking roads and checkpoints to Crimea so that Ukrainian goods could not come in, with Dzhemilev criticisng businesses that still sent products to Crimea. In light of this, after unidentified people blew up the electricity pylon in Kherson Oblast to Crimea, Crimean Tatar activists began to also prevent repairing it, with Dzhemilev saying supply should only be returned if Russia freed Ukrainian prisoners in politically motivated cases. Over the following year of 2016, he, Chubarov, and Lenur Islyamov, who was appointed the blockade coordinator, continued to cooperate together on blockading. The Mejlis were eventually banned in late April 2016 by Russia for "extremist activities". In 2018, he claimed Russia was trying to deliberately change the demographics of Russia, bringing in hundreds of thousands of Russians, and called it a war crime. He was eventually dismissed as commissioner by Poroshenko in May 2019, with the reason not being provided. Nevertheless, he re-ran in the 2019 Ukrainian parliamentary elections, this time being placed on the European Solidarity list at No. 6. Dzhemilev is a member of the Committee on Human Rights, Deoccupation and Reintegration of Temporarily Occupied Territories in Donetsk, Luhansk Regions and Autonomous Republic of Crimea, the city of Sevastopol, National Minorities and Interethnic Relations.

=== 2020s ===
Dzhemilev in the Verkhovna Rada in 2022.

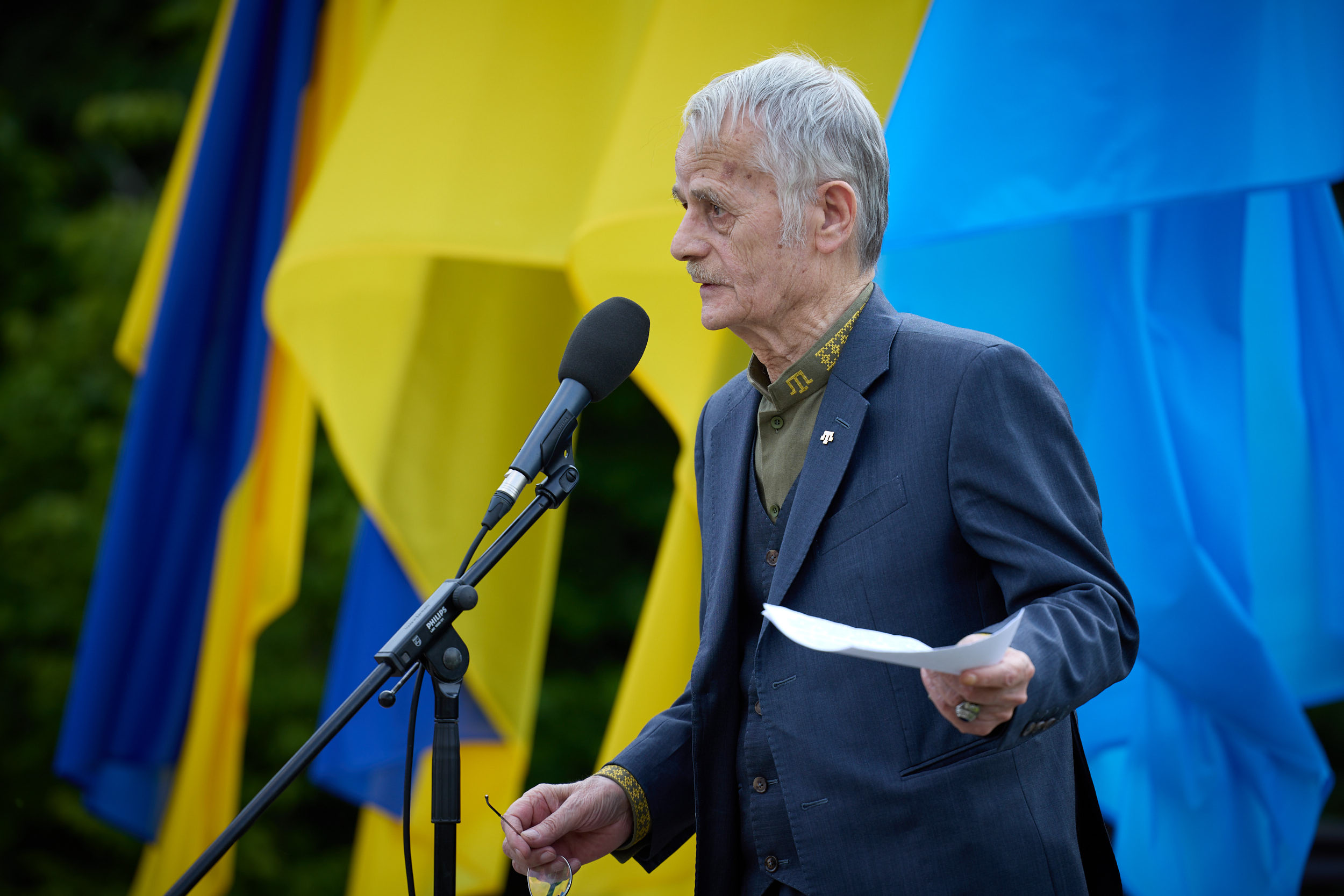
Dzhemilev in 2024 during the Remembrance Day of the Genocide of the Crimean Tatar People.

==== 2020-2021: Early years ====
In late 2020, Dzhemilev requested that the post of Commissioner of the President of Ukraine for Crimean Tatar Affairs be reinstated, saying the new Ukrainian president, Volodymyr Zelenskyy, had told him he was waiting for a candidate. In early 2021, he continued advocating for an embargo on Russian goods and cut off SWIFT access for Russia to cut off the Russian Armed Forces during the Prelude to the 2022 Russian invasion of Ukraine.

==== 2022: Russian invasion of Ukraine ====
In the days after the 2022 Russian invasion of Ukraine, Dzhemilev and Rustem Umerov flew to Turkey at Zelenskyy's request to seek weapons assistance from the country, specifically from Baykar. During the talks in Istanbul soon after in March, he acted as a Ukrainian representative, meeting with Roman Abramovich alongside Umerov. Abramovich said he was acting for Putin. During this discussion, Dzhemilev allegedly said all Russians were to blame for the war, and not just the Russian authorities. Dzhemilev later recalled that the Istanbul talks had been amended to allow for more talks on Crimea. However, he criticised the Russian position, with Russia advocating for Crimea to go to Russia, for the LPR and DPR to be recognised as republics, and for Ukraine to abandon the EU, NATO, and Western weapons. Dzhemilev, over the next few months, would continue acting as a representative, calling the Bucha massacre unbelievable. He also passed on appeals from commanders and medics during the Siege of Mariupol to Turkish media, and met with İbrahim Kalın. In an interview from 2022, he admitted he had not initially supported Zelenskyy, instead backing Poroshenko, but he said Zelenskyy was acting bravely during the invasion and said he was proud of him. Reaching out to the Crimean Tatars, he said that Crimean Tatars still in Crimea should not join the Russian Army, and instead should refuse and go to prison. Towards the end of the year, he said Ukraine should destroy the Crimean Bridge, which he called justified, calling it illegally built and that it was used to carry weapons against Ukraine.

==== Post-2022: Modern politics ====
In 2023, Dzhemilev started becoming an activist for the resistance movement Atesh, saying that the movement was embedded deeply underground and had not been uncovered. He said that they were ready to take up arms and wanted the creation of a "national republic". Dzhemilev also took up talks with Mykhailo Podolyak to prepare for a potential liberation of Crimea. He later admitted in September that Muslim countries were not doing enough for Ukraine, and said that they were still preparing a deoccupation plan for Crimea with the Ukrainian government. In the following year, he continued advocating that Crimean Tatars had no future without deoccupation from Russia, and said the only route forward was a military route, and said there was nothing more to talk about with Putin since diplomatic talks had already been held. The following year, he said Turkey could no longer play a mediating role in the conflict, and said that any negotiations for the end of the war should include the Crimean Tatars if they discussed Crimea. Dzhemilev later, in April, tried to request from Erdoğan an international monitoring group in Crimea. The following month, he called reports that the United States was willing to recognise Crimea as Russians shameful and a blow to the international reputation of the United States.

== Personal life ==
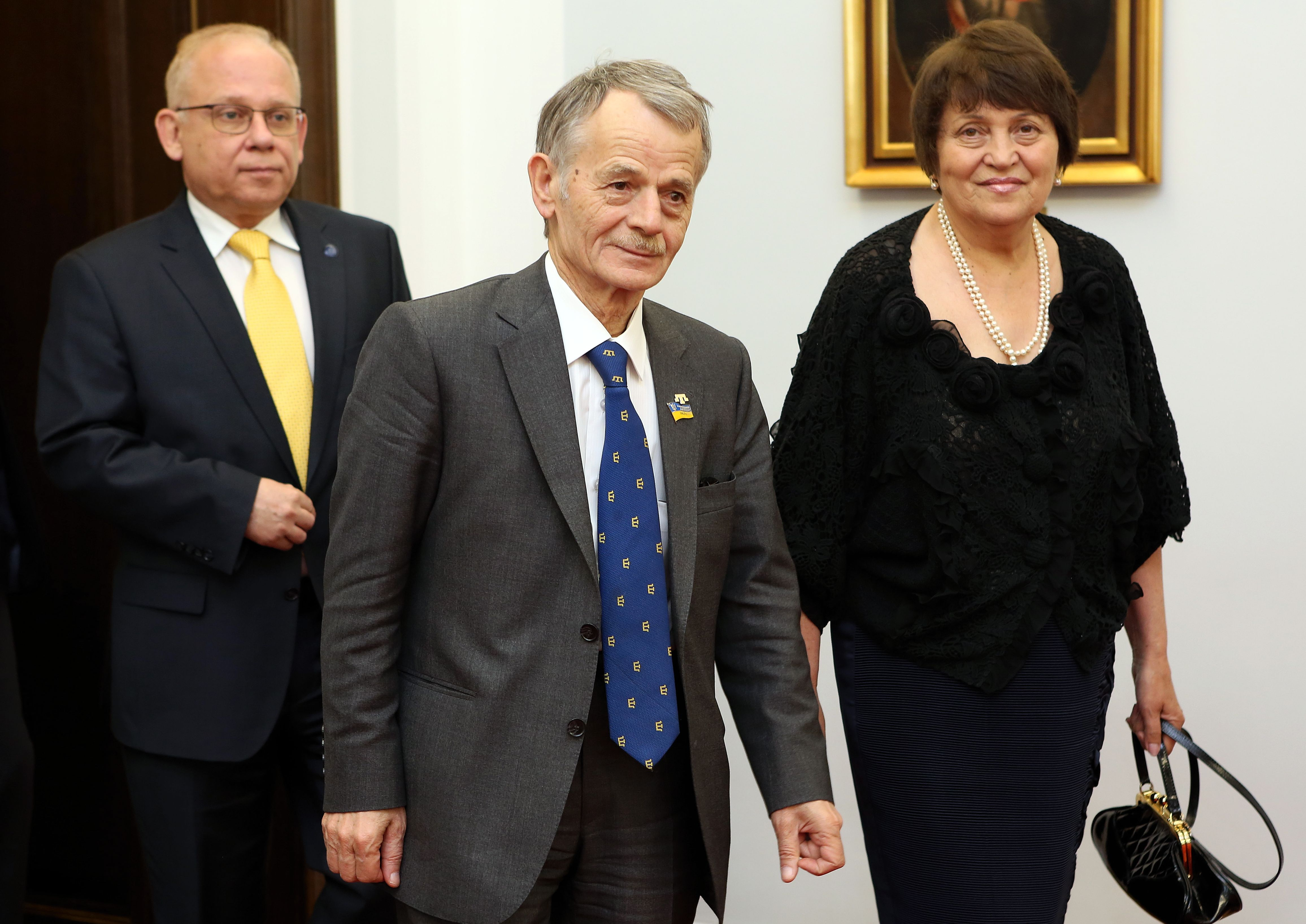
Mustafa with his wife, Safinar (right), in 2014.

Dzhemilev had a number of siblings. His brothers included Anafi (died in Crimea, July 2024) and Asan (died in Bakhchysarai, April 2026). His sisters are Shevkiye (died in Crimea, October 2015), Vasfiye, Gulzar (died in Crimea, March 2025), and Dilyara.

Dzhemilev was previously married, with whom he had a daughter, Elzara. He later remarried to Safinar Dzhemileva, whom he remains married to. Safinar was also exiled to Yangiyul and graduated from the Tashkent Institute of Foreign Languages. She worked as a teacher before marrying Mustafa, who was her second husband. She was also involved in Crimean Tatar politics, having created and headed the "League of Crimean Tatar Women" since their return in 1986. She was awarded the title of Order of Princess Olga, III degree, by Viktor Yushchenko in 2010. Together, they had two children: Hayser (born in 1981) and Eldar (born in 1974, adopted). Eldar died in October 2025, and was previously a part of the Ukrainian peacekeeping unit stationed in Iraq from 2003 to 2008. His son, Hayser, was released from a Russian colony in Astrakhan where he was under supervision in 2016 after a court recognised his Ukrainian citizenship.

== Persecution in Russia and ban from Crimea ==
On 22 April 2014, Dzhemilev was barred from entering Crimea for a period of five years as a persona non grata. This was on the basis of Section 1, Article 27 of the Federal Law on Departure and Entry to Russia. In a statement the following day, the Russian FMS under the Deputy Head of the Temporary Group of Crimea, Yuri Zvyagintsev, said they had nothing to do with the handing of the document. In 2019, the Federal Security Service of Russia (FSB) extended his ban due to an ongoing trial in absentia in Armiansk, in which he was accused by Russia of illegally attempting to enter Crimea and of negligent possession of a firearm and ammunition (the latter was added retroactively due to his sons' charges in 2013). Dzhemilev later said he did not know about the 2019 extension, and only knew about being sanctioned by Russia in 2018. The trial in Armiansk officially began in July 2020 under Venera Isroilova, where numerous eyewitnesses said that there were no signs marking the border. On 5 March 2021, Russia extended the ban for another 13 years, until at least 2034, which Dzhemilev called politically motivated and due to his rejection of the Russian annexation of Crimea. That same day, Dzhemilev said he would appeal to the European Court of Human Rights over the ban. In early February 2022, Russian prosecutor Anton Marchenko submitted a document to the FSB border guard in which the coordinates of the state border were different than the original indictment from April 2022, which was granted. Dzhemilev's lawyer, Nikolai Polozov, rejected the case and said the FSB did not have the authority to define borders; only Rosreestr did.

== Honours and awards ==
=== Honours ===
A newspaper featuring Dzhemilev in 2014.

Dzhemilev has been nominated for the Nobel Peace Prize several times, by various NGOs and persons.

=== Commemoration ===
In Turkey, there is a number of places named after him. In 2014, the Mustafa Abdülcemil Kırımoğlu Park was opened in Konya, Turkey. Eight years later, a park was named in honour of him in Kırıkkale, Turkey, on the initiative of the local Union of Crimean Tatars. Afterwards, two cities in Turkey opened up places named after him: in Bursa, the Mustafa Abdülcemil Kırımoğlu Park; and in Eskişehir (Odunpazarı municipality), there is a museum named after him. In 2024, Eskişehir also opened the Park of Crimean Culture, which has a bust of him.

In Ukraine, there are street names named after him also, alongside some in Crimea, although in Crimea these have been frequently renamed by the Russian authorities post-2014. In the small village of Zolotoe Pole in Crimea, a street was named after him, starting in 2022, until it was renamed to "Molodezhnaya" after the Russian activist Alexander Talipov pointed this out and called him a traitor.

=== Awards ===
Dzhemilev has been awarded the following awards:

- United Nations – Nansen Medal (October 1998, United Nations High Commissioner for Refugees)
- Ukraine – Order of Prince Yaroslav the Wise of the V grade (2001)
- Ukraine – Order of Prince Yaroslav the Wise of the IV grade (2003)
- Turkey – Order of the Republic (14 April 2014)
- Poland – Solidarity Prize (3 June 2014, also its first recipient)
- Lithuania – Order for Merits to Lithuania (2015)
- Ukraine – Order of Liberty (2018)
- Poland – Grand Cross of the Order of Merit of the Republic of Poland (2022)
- Ukraine – Hero of Ukraine (November 13, 2023).
- Czech Republic – Medal of Merit (October 28, 2024).

== See also ==
- Crimea
- Crimean Tatars
- List of Crimean Tatars
- Islam in Ukraine

== Bibliography ==
- Бажан, Олег (2024). Хроніка кримськотатарського національного руху (1940–1980-ті роки) (in Ukrainian). Інститут історії України НАН України.
- З ПАМ’ЯТТЮ ПРОМИНУЛЕТА В ІМ’Я СПРАВЕДЛИВОСТІ (PDF). Кримські татари: шлях до поверненн. 2015.
- Yaremchuk, Olesya (16 November 2020). Our Others. Ibidem Press. ISBN 978-3-8382-1475-7.
- ERDEMİR, İREM (2019). The awakening of the Crimean Tatar nationalist movement under the leadership of Kırımoğlu (Master's degree thesis). Ankara Yıldırım Beyazıt University.
- Allworth, Edward (1998). The Tatars of Crimea: Return to the Homeland : Studies and Documents. Duke University Press. pp. 283–285. ISBN 978-0-8223-1994-8.

== Interviews ==
- "Interview: Crimean Tatar leader expects tensions to rise". Radio Liberty. 5 May 2014.
- Голицына, Наталья (16 May 2014). Мустафа Джемилев: "70 лет спустя многое повторяется" [Mustafa Dzhemilev, "70 years later a lot of events repeat"]. Радио Свобода (in Russian). Radio Liberty.
- Бурноc, Тарас (14 December 2015). "Golos-ameriki" Мустафа Джемилев: электроэнергия для Крыма – в обмен на свободу для политзаключенных [Mustafa Dzhemilev: electricity for the Crimea – in exchange for freedom for political prisoners] (in Russian). Voice of America.
- Спецвипуск. Пам'яті Андрія Сахарова [Special program issue. In commemoration of Andrei Sakharov, Mustafa Dzhemilev's interview to Semyon Gluzman, in Russian], 26 min, 15 December 2014 on YouTube

Political offices
Preceded by position introduced	Chairman of Mejlis of the Crimean Tatar People; 1991–2013	Succeeded by Refat Chubarov
