= Mizhrichchia =

Mizhrichchia Міжріччя
- Village
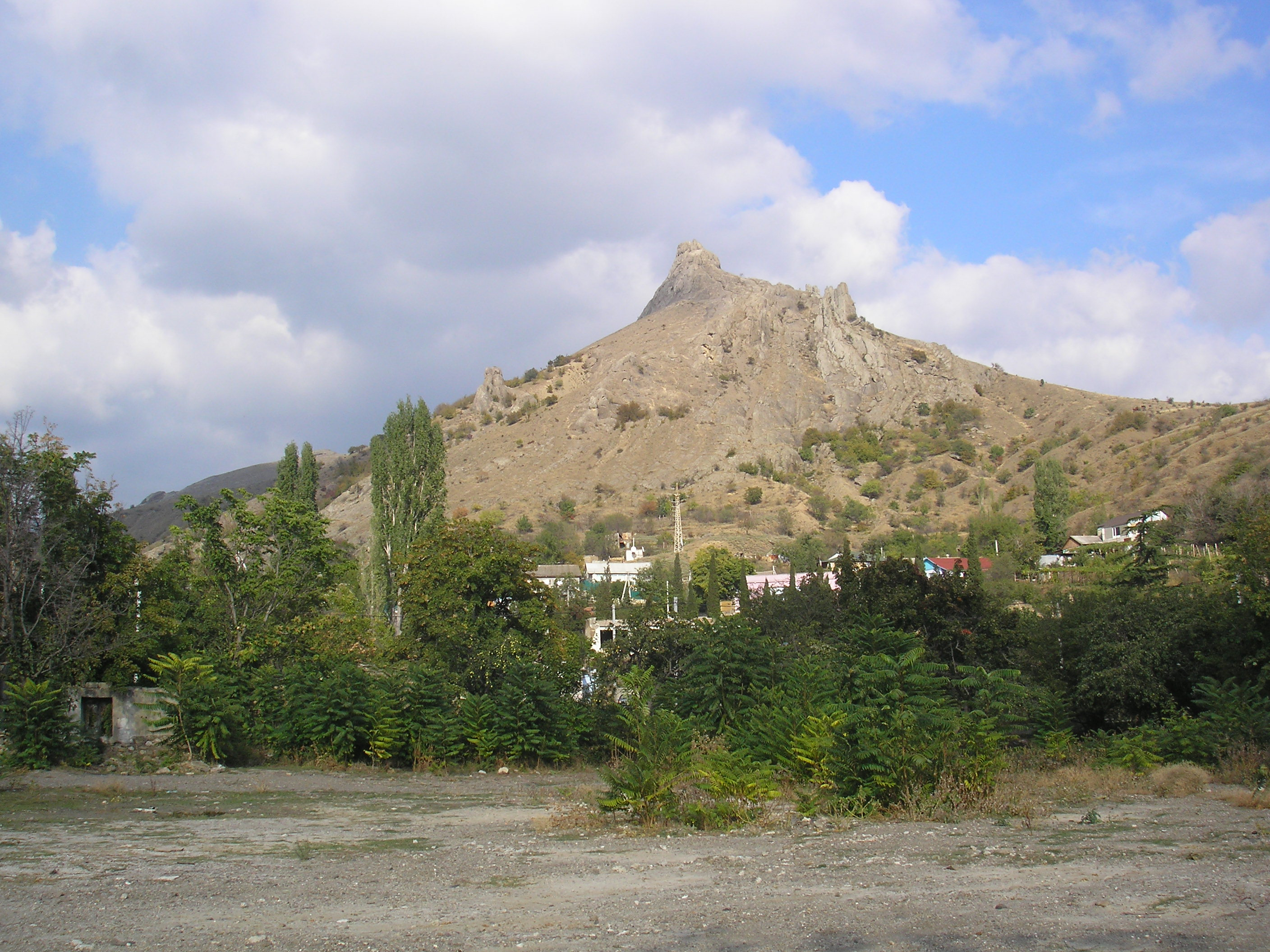
- View of Mizhrichchia with the Crimean Mountains in the background.

- Location of Mizhrichchia in Crimea
- Coordinates: 44°52′43″N 34°50′55″E
- Republic: Crimea
- Raion: Feodosia Raion
- First mentioned: 1381

Area
  - Total: 0.6 km^{2} (0.23 sq mi)
- Elevation: 198 m (650 ft)

Population (2014)
  - Total: 519
  - Density: 860/km^{2} (2,200/sq mi)
- Time zone: UTC+4 (MSK)
- Postal code: 98030
- Area code: +380 6566
- Website: http://rada.gov.ua/

Mizhrichchia or Mezhdurechye (Ukrainian: Міжріччя; Russian: Междуречье; literally, between the rivers) is a village in the Feodosia Raion of Crimea, a territory recognized by a majority of countries as part of Ukraine and annexed by Russia as the Republic of Crimea.

Mizhrichchia is located on Crimea's southern shore in the Crimean Mountains at an elevation of 198 m (650 ft). Its population was 510 in the 2001 Ukrainian census. Current population: 519 (2014 Census).

== History ==
Previously, the settlement was known as the Ai-Serez village (Crimean Tatar: Ay Serez). Following the forced deportation of the Crimean Tatars in 1944, the Presidium of the Supreme Soviet of the Russian SFSR published a decree on May 18, 1948 renaming the settlement along with many others throughout Crimea from their native Crimean Tatar names to their current variants.

In 1886, the village of Ai-Serez was located in the Taraktash Volost of the Feodosia Povit of the Taurida Governorate. At that time, the settlement had a population of 655 inhabitants; it had two mosques located in its settlement. In the 1897 Russian Empire census, the population increased to 1,464 inhabitants, 1,458 of which belonged to the Muslim faith.

== People from Mizhrichchia ==
- Mustafa Dzhemilev, former Chairman of the Mejlis of the Crimean Tatar People, People's Deputy of Ukraine since 1998
- Abdurakhman Chubarov, father of Refat Chubarov, current Chairman of the Mejlis of the Crimean Tatar People
