= Order of the State of the Republic of Turkey =

Highest state order awarded to foreign nationals

Order of the State of Republic of Turkey Türkiye Cumhuriyeti Devlet Nişanı

Awarded by President of Turkey
- Type: State Orders
- Eligibility: Foreign Presidents, Heads of State and royal members
- Awarded for: "Given to people for the development of friendly relations with the Republic of Turkey"
- Status: Currently constituted
- Grades: Order of the State; Order of the Gold Star

Statistics
- First induction: 14 July 1994 (Poland) Lech Wałęsa
- Last induction: 7 May 2026 (Algeria) Abdelmadjid Tebboune
- Total inductees: 35

Precedence
- Next (higher): None (highest)
- Next (lower): Order of the Republic
- Ribbon bar of the order (since 2013)

The Order of the State of Republic of Turkey (Turkish: Türkiye Cumhuriyeti Devlet Nişanı) is the highest state order awarded to foreign nationals by the President of the Republic of Turkey.

The Order of the State is conferred by the President, upon the decision of the Council of Ministers, to heads of state, presidents, and members of royal families in recognition of their contributions for enhancing the amicable relations between their respective countries and Turkey. The "Regulation on State Awards and Medals" (numbered 19892) was prepared and entered in the Official Gazette on 7 August 1988.

== Characteristics ==
The medal of the Order of the Republic of Turkey has a diameter of 8.9 cm. Composed of gold and silver, there is 18 carat green gold in the hexagonal center, a white enamel crescent and star on a red background, and a pencil application on six crescents around it. There are a total of seven swords, four long and three short, with white and red metal applications from the middle of the crescents and six white and red star enamels at the ends of these swords. 18-carat green gold is used in the stars.

The badge is a horizontal rectangle and measures 3.40 cm × 1.67 cm. There is a silver frame pen application around it, a Turkish flag motif on the ground, and a rhodium-plated crescent and star enamel in white and red in the middle. The order consists of 61.5 grams of silver (925 sterling silver) and 5.4 grams of gold (750 mil gold). The rosette is 7.15 grams (925 sterling silver).

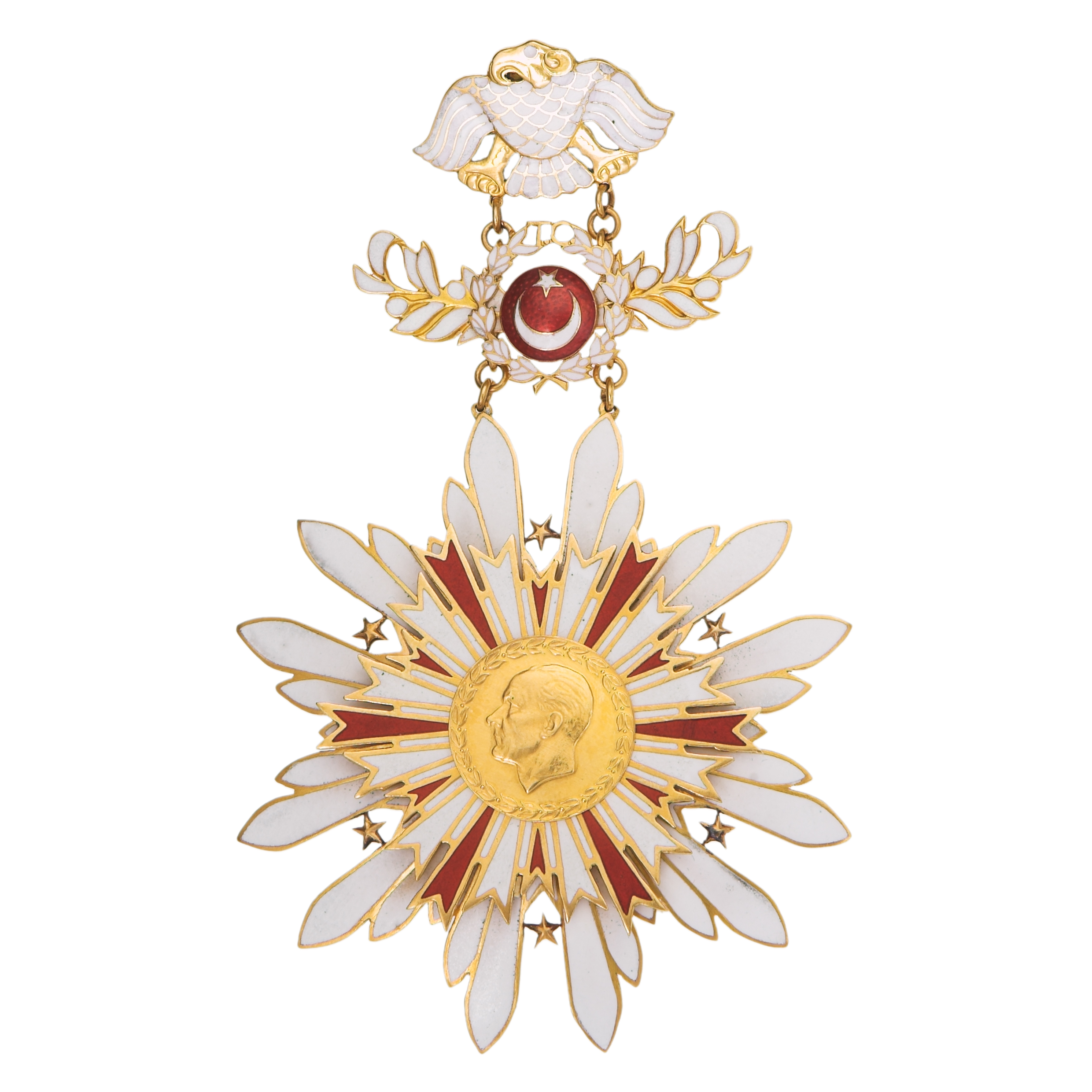
First Class Order of the State awarded between 1988 and 2013

On 5 November 2013, with the regulation issued by the Justice and Development Party and approved by the President Abdullah Gül and published in the Official Gazette, the Mustafa Kemal Atatürk silhouette on the front of the state badge and the caption of "Turkish Republic Order of the State" on the back were removed. The Public Workers Unions Confederation of Turkey (Kamu-Sen) sued the State Council at the request of a stay of implementation and cancellation. In October 2016, the Council of State gave the cancellation of the missing regulation part of the state medal decision in the 6th article of the State Medals and Insignia Regulation, without including the "Atatürk Relief". The Prime Ministry appealed the decision. On 10 October 2018, a higher court of the Council of State, the Board of Trial Chambers, "emphasizing that Atatürk is the immortal leader", approved the decision of the lower court by majority vote and canceled the regulated part.

== Ceremony ==
The Order of the State is given to the awardee together with the certificate and badge by the President of Turkey or a person appointed by the President at a ceremony. If the awardee is deceased (and the award has not been delegated to an heir), it is given to a son, starting from the eldest; to a daughter if there are no sons; to the father if there are no children; to the mother if there is no father; or to the spouse if there is no mother. In the absence of a spouse, it is transferred to the awardee's legal heirs in accordance with the provisions of the Turkish Civil Code.

The ceremony follows certain protocol and procedures. It starts with the National Anthem of Turkey and then decision regarding the aiming parties is read. Then, the award presenter faces each recipient and attaches their medal, awards their badges and certificates, and congratulates them. Recipients stand at intervals from the right, separately for each medal and decoration group. The order of the groups is arranged according to the priority order of the awards or medal in the law, the priority of the persons according to state protocol for public officials, and the surname (for private persons).

== Statistics ==
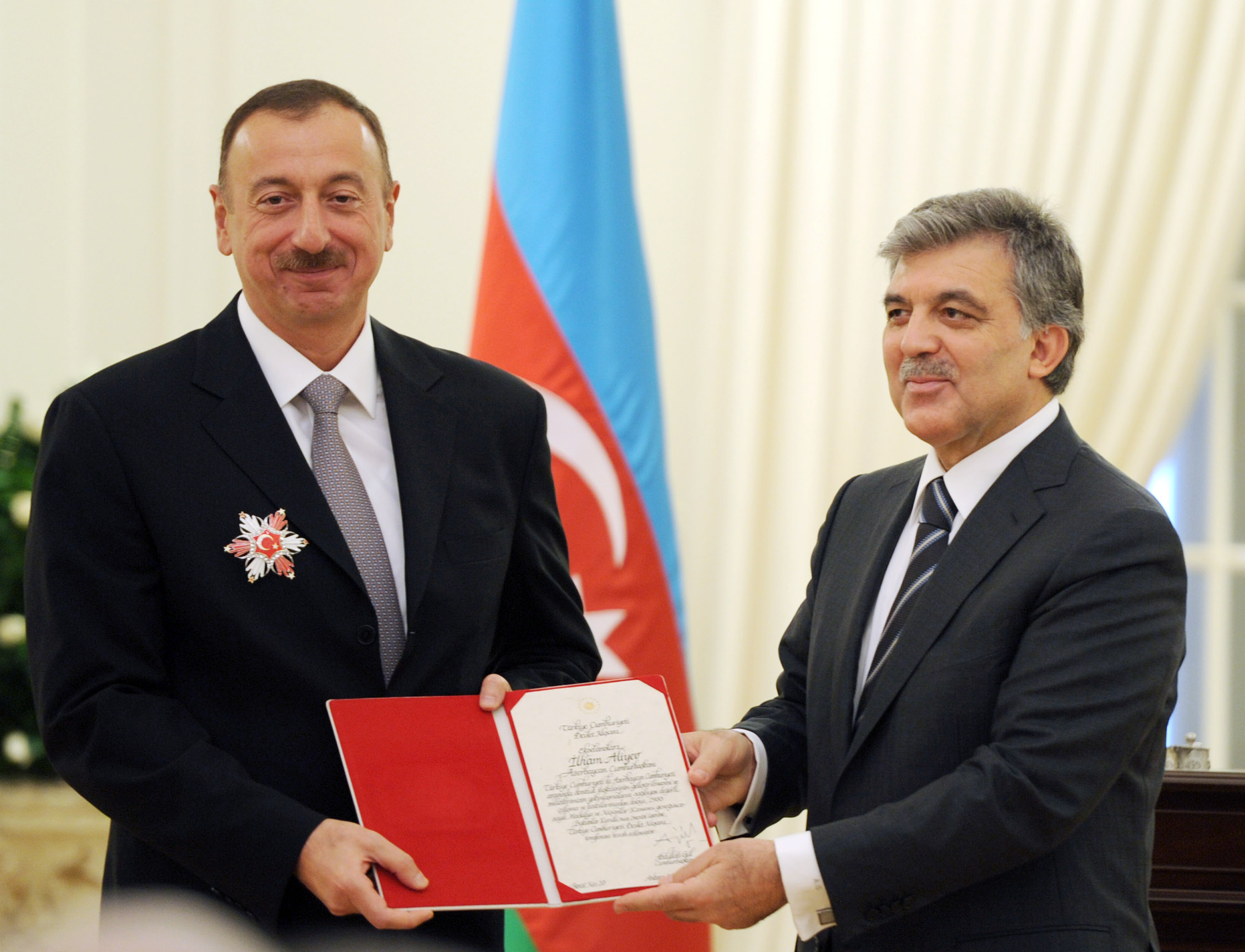
Turkish President Abdullah Gül gives the medal and certificate to Azerbaijani President Ilham Aliyev, 12 November 2013, Ankara

The order was first given to Lech Wałęsa, the second president of Poland, by President Süleyman Demirel in 1994. Demirel awarded the honor to the heads of state of 12 countries during his tenure. President Ahmet Necdet Sezer awarded the order only to the first president of the Czech Republic, Václav Havel. No order was given between 2001–2006. After President Abdullah Gül took office, the state order was given again beginning with King Abdullah of Saudi Arabia. Recep Tayyip Erdoğan awarded the order to King Philippe I of Belgium, King Salman bin Abdulaziz of Saudi Arabia, Emir of Kuwait Sabah al-Ahmad al-Jabir al-Sabah, and Tunisian President Beji Caid Essebsi. Azerbaijan, Poland, Kazakhstan, Kuwait, and Saudi Arabia are the only countries to have received the order twice. In total, 35 people have been awarded the Order of the State.

== Recipients of the Order of State ==
	Year	Country	Name	Title	Conferred by	Ref.
1	1994	Poland	Lech Wałęsa	President of Poland	Süleyman Demirel	
2	1997	Azerbaijan	Heydar Aliyev	President of Azerbaijan	Süleyman Demirel	
3	1997	Bosnia and Herzegovina	Alija Izetbegović	Chairman of the Presidency of Bosnia and Herzegovina	Süleyman Demirel	
4	1998	Egypt	Hosni Mubarak	President of Egypt	Süleyman Demirel	
5	1999	Croatia	Franjo Tuđman	President of Croatia	Süleyman Demirel	
6	1999	Georgia	Eduard Shevardnadze	President of Georgia	Süleyman Demirel	
7	1999	Romania	Emil Constantinescu	President of Romania	Süleyman Demirel	
8	1999	United States	Bill Clinton	President of the United States	Süleyman Demirel	
9	1999	Finland	Martti Ahtisaari	President of Finland	Süleyman Demirel	
10	2000	Germany	Johannes Rau	President of Germany	Süleyman Demirel	
11	2000	Poland	Aleksander Kwaśniewski	President of Poland	Süleyman Demirel	
12	2000	China	Jiang Zemin	General Secretary of the Chinese Communist Party; President of China	Süleyman Demirel	
13	2000	Czech Republic	Václav Havel	President of the Czech Republic	Ahmet Necdet Sezer	
14	2007	Saudi Arabia	Abdullah bin Abdul Aziz	King of Saudi Arabia	Abdullah Gül	
15	2008	United Kingdom	Elizabeth II	Queen of the United Kingdom and Commonwealth realm nations	Abdullah Gül	
16	2009	Portugal	Aníbal Cavaco Silva	President of Portugal	Abdullah Gül	
17	2009	Kazakhstan	Nursultan Nazarbayev	President of Kazakhstan	Abdullah Gül	
18	2009	Italy	Giorgio Napolitano	President of Italy	Abdullah Gül	
19	2011	Pakistan	Asif Ali Zardari	President of Pakistan	Abdullah Gül	
20	2012	Turkmenistan	Gurbanguly Berdimuhamedow	President of Turkmenistan	Abdullah Gül	
21	2012	Netherlands	Beatrix	Queen of the Netherlands	Abdullah Gül	
22	2013	Sweden	Carl XVI Gustaf	King of Sweden	Abdullah Gül	
23	2013	Norway	Harald V	King of Norway	Abdullah Gül	
24	2013	Azerbaijan	Ilham Aliyev	President of Azerbaijan	Abdullah Gül	
25	2013	Luxembourg	Henri	Grand Duke of Luxembourg	Abdullah Gül	
26	2015	Belgium	Philippe	King of Belgium	Recep Tayyip Erdoğan	
27	2016	Saudi Arabia	Salman bin Abdul Aziz	King of Saudi Arabia	Recep Tayyip Erdoğan	
28	2017	Kuwait	Sabah Al-Ahmad Al-Jaber Al-Sabah	Emir of Kuwait	Recep Tayyip Erdoğan	
29	2017	Tunisia	Beji Caid Essebsi	President of Tunisia	Recep Tayyip Erdoğan	
30	2022	Malaysia	Al-Sultan Abdullah	Yang di-Pertuan Agong of Malaysia	Recep Tayyip Erdoğan	
31	2024	Kuwait	Mishal Al-Ahmad Al-Jaber Al-Sabah	Emir of Kuwait	Recep Tayyip Erdoğan	
32	2024	Uzbekistan	Shavkat Mirziyoyev	President of Uzbekistan	Recep Tayyip Erdoğan	
33	2024	Oman	Haitham bin Tariq	Sultan of Oman	Recep Tayyip Erdoğan	
34	2025	Kazakhstan	Kassym-Jomart Tokayev	President of Kazakhstan	Recep Tayyip Erdoğan	
35	2026	Algeria	Abdelmadjid Tebboune	President of Algeria	Recep Tayyip Erdoğan	
