= Order of the Republic (Turkey) =

Medal order issued by Turkish government

Order of the Republic Türkiye Cumhuriyeti Cumhuriyet Nişanı

Awarded by President of Turkey
- Type: State Orders
- Eligibility: Foreign Prime Ministers, Ministers and foreign representative members
- Awarded for: "Given to people for the development of friendly relations and with the Republic of Turkey."
- Status: Currently awarded

Statistics
- First induction: 07 December 2010 (Pakistan) Yousaf Raza Gillani
- Last induction: 8 January 2026 (Malaysia) Anwar Ibrahim
- Total inductees: 9

Precedence
- Next (higher): Order of the State
- Next (lower): Order of Merit
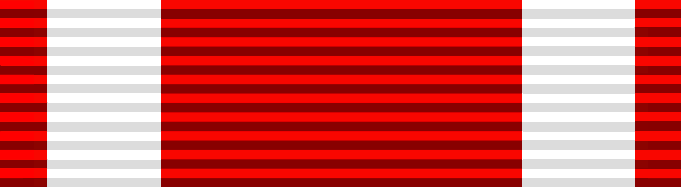
- Ribbon bar of order

The Order of the Republic (Turkish: Türkiye Cumhuriyeti Cumhuriyet Nişanı) is the second highest state order after the Order of the State.

The Order is conferred by the President of Turkey, upon the decision of the Council of Ministers, to the prime ministers, ministers and members of foreign missions in recognition of their contributions for bringing the nations closer and enhancing the amicable relations between their respective countries and the Republic of Turkey.

== Recipients of the Order of Republic ==
Year appointed	Nationality	Recipient	Office when awarded	Conferred by	Ref.
2010	Pakistan	Yousaf Raza Gillani	18th Prime Minister of Pakistan	Abdullah Gül	
2012	United Kingdom	Jack Straw	Member of Parliament of the United Kingdom	Abdullah Gül	
2012	United Kingdom	Jack Straw	Former member of the Cabinet of the United Kingdom	Abdullah Gül	
2013	The Netherlands	René van der Linden	Member of the Senate of the Netherlands	Abdullah Gül	
2013	The Netherlands	René van der Linden	Former President of the Senate of the Netherlands	Abdullah Gül	
2013	The Netherlands	René van der Linden	Former President of the Parliamentary Assembly of the Council of Europe	Abdullah Gül	
2013	Pakistan	Nawaz Sharif	20th Prime Minister of Pakistan	Abdullah Gül	
2014	Ukraine	Mustafa Dzhemilev	Member of Parliament of Ukraine	Abdullah Gül	
2014	Ukraine	Mustafa Dzhemilev	Former president of Mejlis of the Crimean Tatar People	Abdullah Gül	
2014	Italy	Carlo Marsili	Former Ambassador of Italy to Turkey	Abdullah Gül	
2016	Saudi Arabia	Muhammad bin Nayef	Crown Prince of Saudi Arabia	Recep Tayyip Erdoğan	
2019	Malaysia	Mahathir Mohamad	7th Prime Minister of Malaysia	Recep Tayyip Erdoğan	
2026	Malaysia	Anwar Ibrahim	10th Prime Minister of Malaysia	Recep Tayyip Erdoğan	
