= Refat Chubarov =

Crimean Tatar politician in Ukraine

- Refat Çubarov (Crimean Tatar); Рефат Чубаров (Ukrainian)
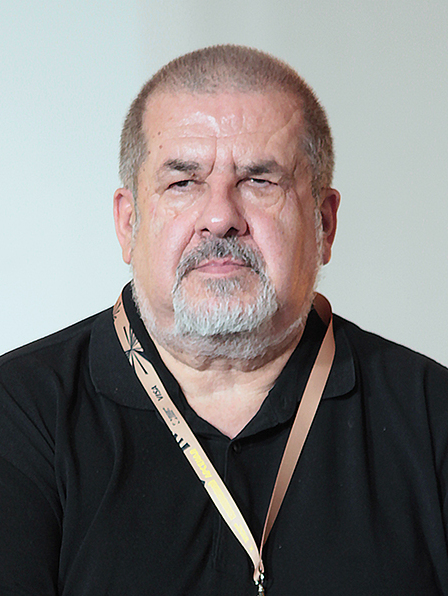
- Chubarov in 2021

2nd Chairman of the Mejlis of the Crimean Tatar People
- Incumbent
- Assumed office 28 October 2013
- Preceded by: Mustafa Dzhemilev

President of the Worldwide Congress of Crimean Tatars
- Incumbent
- Assumed office 2009

People's Deputy of Ukraine
- In office 15 May 2015 – 29 August 2019
- Constituency: Petro Poroshenko Bloc, No. 71
- In office 1998–2007

Personal details
- Born: 22 September 1957 (age 69) Samarkand, Uzbek SSR, Soviet Union
- Party: Strength and Honor (since 2019); Petro Poroshenko Bloc (2014–2019)

Refat Abdurahman oglu Chubarov (Note: Crimean Tatar: Refat Abdurahman oğlu Çubarov; Cyrillic: Рефат Абдурахман огълу Чубаров Ukrainian: Рефат Абдурахманович Чубаров, romanized: Refat Abdurakhmanovych Chubarov) (born 22 September 1957) is a Crimean politician and public figure, leader of the Crimean Tatar national movement in Ukraine and worldwide.

== Biography ==
Chubarov was born on 22 September 1957 in Samarkand, Uzbek SSR in the family of Crimean Tatar Abduraman Seitasan oglu Chubarov (1931–2014), who was deported in 1944 by the Soviet authorities from his native village of Ay Serez (today Mizhrichchia, Sudak Municipality). In 1968, the Chubarov family was allowed to return, but not to the southern coast of Crimea, so the family settled in Pryvilne (Krasnoperekopsk Raion).

In 1983 Chubarov graduated from the Moscow State Historic-Archive Institute. After graduation and until September 1990 he worked at the Central State Archives of the October Revolution and the Socialist Construction of Latvian SSR in Riga. From 1989 to 1991, Chubarov was a regional representative at the Riga city council, as a member of the Popular Front of Latvia faction, which favoured Latvian independence from the Soviet Union.

Since November 2013, he has served as the chairman of the Mejlis of the Crimean Tatar People. He served as Deputy Chairman of the Supreme Council of Crimea from 1995 to 1998 and as People's Deputy of Ukraine from 1998 to 2007. He has also served as the President of the Worldwide Congress of Crimean Tatars since 2009. In 2014, he called the Crimean status referendum "a circus" and also said that it was "a tragedy, an illegitimate government with armed forces from another country". In the aftermath of the referendum Russia annexed Crimea on 18 March 2014.

In June 2014, Chubarov vowed to boycott the September 2014 Crimean parliamentary election.

From 15 May 2015, Chubarov was a member of the Verkhovna Rada (Ukraine's parliament) as a member of the Petro Poroshenko Bloc. He was placed #71 on this party's election list during the 2014 Ukrainian parliamentary election.

In November 2015, Russia unsuccessfully tried to place Chubarov on the Interpol search list, after a Ukrainian query not to admit this request. Russia accused Chubarov of calling for secession of Crimea from Russia.

The Mejlis of the Crimean Tatar People was labeled an "extremist organisation" and subsequently banned by Crimea's supreme court on 26 April 2016.

Chubarov again took part in the July 2019 Ukrainian parliamentary election, this time for the party Strength and Honor. The party won 3.82% of the vote, not enough to meet the 5% election threshold and thus got no parliamentary seats.

== Notes ==
Political offices
Preceded by Mustafa Dzhemilev	Chairman of the Mejlis of the Crimean Tatar People; 2013–	Incumbent
