= Milliy Fırqa (NGO) =

Crimean non-governmental organization

Logo of the NGO

Milliy Fırqa (lit. 'People's Party') is a pro-Russian Crimean Tatar non-government organization founded in 2006. Its name is taken from the former party Milliy Fırqa which was banned by the Soviet authorities in 1921. The current leader is Vasvi Abduraimov.

In 2010, Abduraimov asked Crimean Tatars not to support any candidate in the 2010 Ukrainian presidential election.

Despite marginal support, Abduraimov and Milliy Fırqa were close to the government of Viktor Yanukovych, as well as to the Crimean government of Anatolii Mohyliov. Before the 2013 Crimean Tatar Remembrance Day of Victims of the Deportation, the Simferopol City Council first announced that they were going to ban the event. Later, Crimean authorities accepted a proposal from Milliy Fırqa, who would now be responsible for the event. However, in the face of protests from Crimean Tatar diaspora organizations from Europe, the United States and Turkey, Milliy Fırqa withdrew from the event on 10 May 2013, eight days before the event was scheduled to occur.

During the Russian occupation of Crimea and the subsequent annexation, Milliy Fırqa was possibly the only Crimean Tatar organization to publicly back the referendum organized by the occupational authorities.

As a strong opponent of the Mejlis, supporter of the 2014 annexation of the peninsula, and critic of the post-Euromaidan Ukrainian government, Abduraimov is universally considered to be part of the pro-Russia faction in Crimea; however, his staunch opposition to the controversial "Crimean Rose" Russian settlement project, demolitions of Crimean Tatar houses, certain bans on rallies, and other measures against the Crimean Tatars has been a subject of disagreement with others in the Russian government.
