= Vasvi Abduraimov =

Ukrainian-Russian Crimean Tatar activist and politician

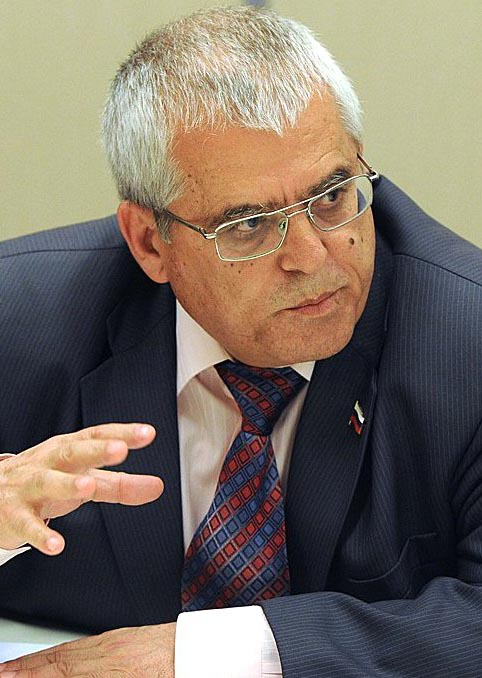
- Born: 18 October 1954 (age 71); Hamza, Oltiariq District, Fergana Region, Uzbek SSR, USSR
- Citizenship: USSR → Ukraine → Russia
- Awards: Medal of the Order "For Merit to the Fatherland"

Vasvi Ennanovich Abduraimov (Russian: Васви Эннанович Абдураимов, Crimean Tatar: Vasvi Ennan oğlu Abduraimov; born 18 October 1954) is the chairman of New Milliy Fırqa. As a strong opponent of the Mejlis, supporter of the 2014 annexation of the peninsula, and critic of the post-Euromaidan Ukrainian government, he is universally considered to be part of the pro-Russia faction in Crimea; however, his staunch opposition to the controversial "Crimean Rose" Russian settlement project, demolitions of Crimean Tatar houses, certain bans on rallies, and other measures against the Crimean Tatars has been a subject of disagreement with others in the Russian government.
