= Administrative divisions of Crimea =

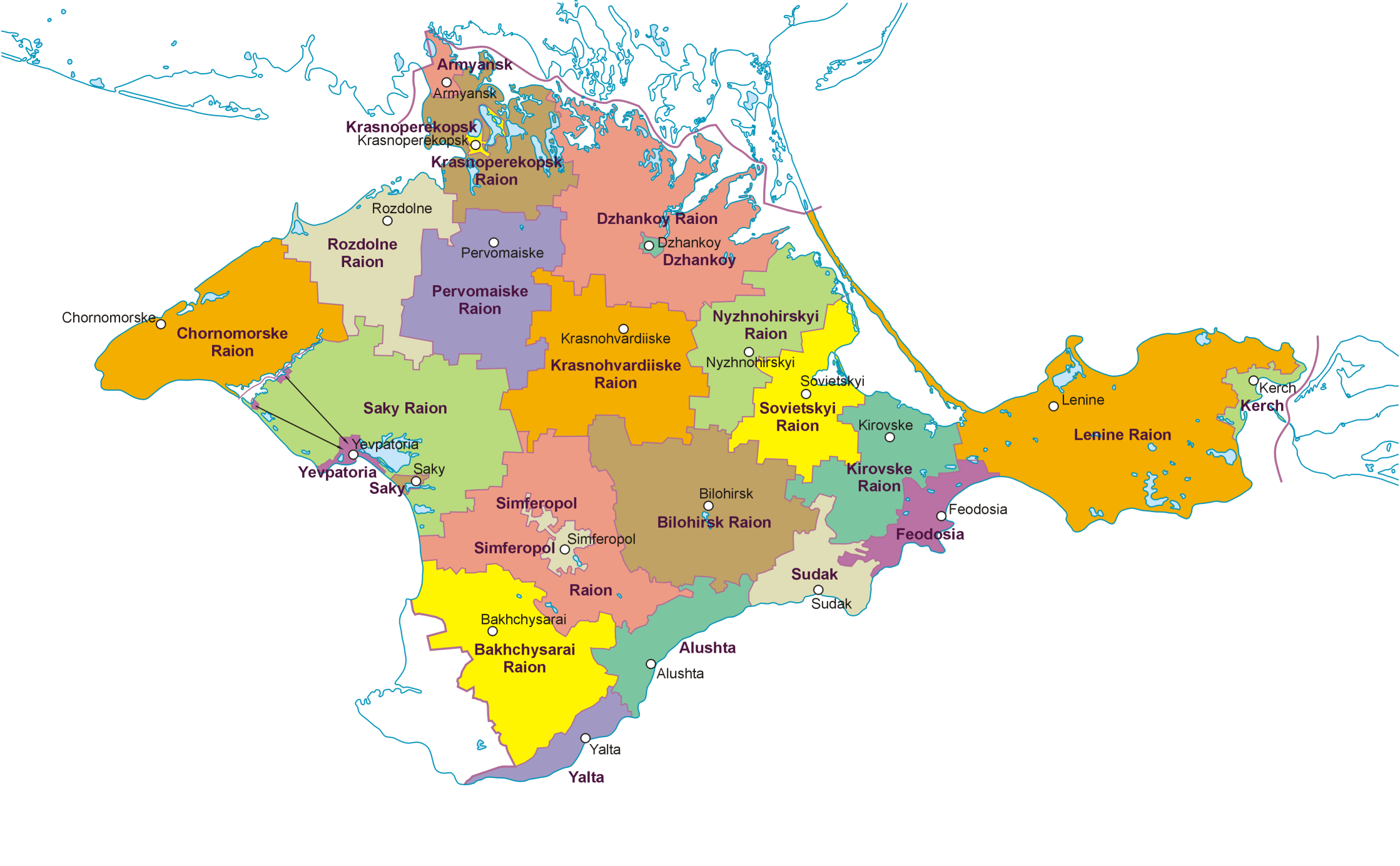
Administrative divisions of the Republic of Crimea and Autonomous Republic of Crimea (before the 2020 reform)

The Crimean Peninsula is a disputed area which as a result of the annexation of Crimea by the Russian Federation is controlled and recognized by Russia as the Republic of Crimea, a federal subject of Russia. At the same time, Ukraine and most UN countries around the world recognize the territory as the Autonomous Republic of Crimea, a part of Ukraine.

The Republic of Crimea continues to use the administrative divisions of the Autonomous Republic of Crimea and is further divided into 14 districts (raions) and 11 city municipalities, officially known as territories governed by city councils. However, in July 2020, Ukraine adopted a reform of its administrative divisions. According to the new divisions, the Autonomous Republic of Crimea only consists of ten districts (raions). Originally the reform was delayed until return of the peninsula under Ukrainian control, but it came into effect on 7 September 2023. The new administrative divisions in Crimea only exist de jure, since Ukraine does not control Crimea and cannot implement their creation.

Under both the Russian (post-April 2014) and the Ukrainian (pre-April 2014) administrative systems, the territory of Crimea excludes the City of Sevastopol.

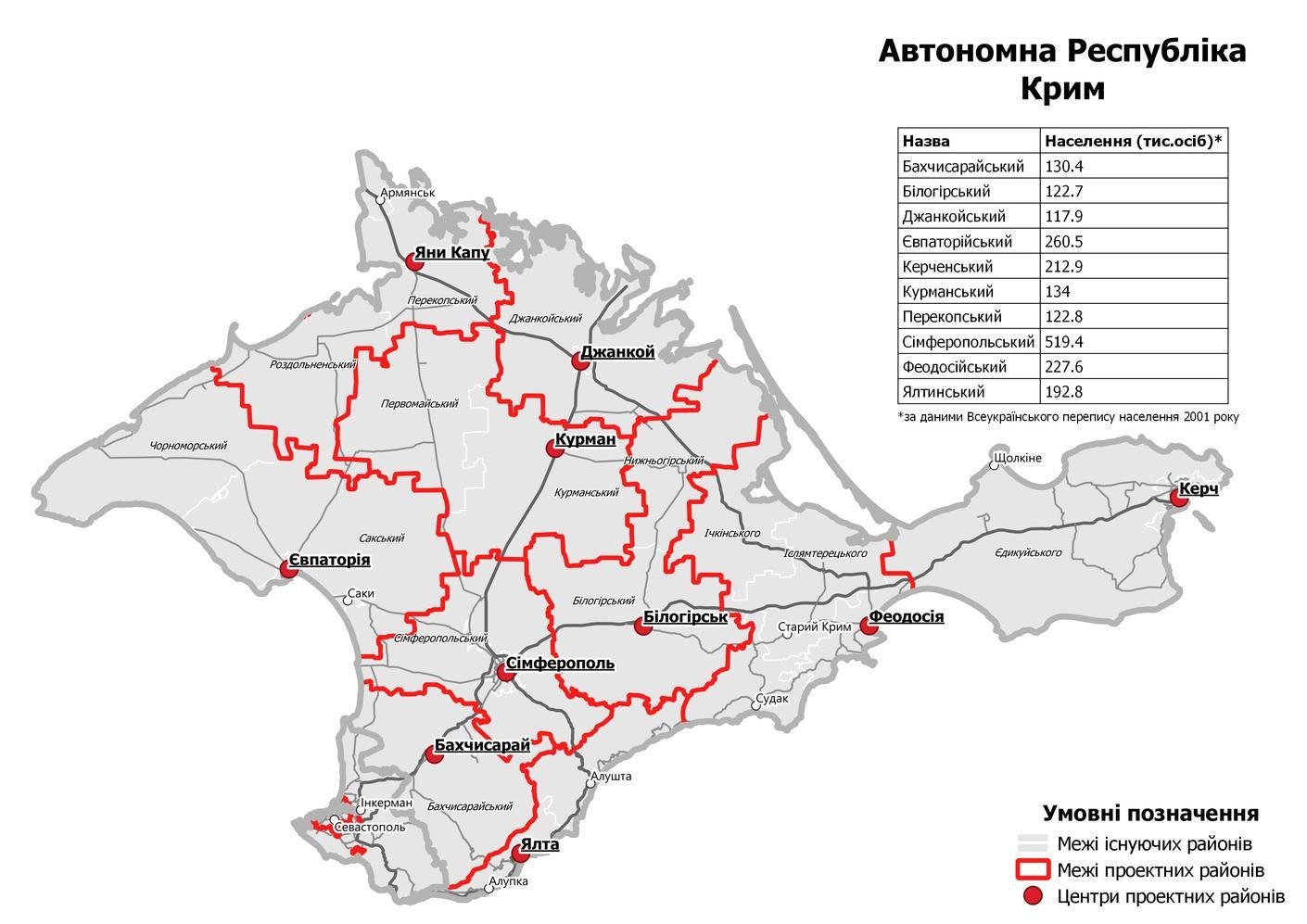
Raions of the Autonomous Republic of Crimea after the 2020 reform (in effect since 2023)

== Administrative divisions ==
Pre-2020 Division (Both Ukrainian and Russian)	Settlements	Post-2020 Division (Ukrainian only)	Notes
Simferopol Municipality	Cities：: Simferopol (Aqmescit, Симферополь, Сімферополь); Urban-type settlements: Ahrarne (Agrarnoye, Аграрное, Аграрне); Aeroflotskyi (Aeroflotskiy, Аэрофлотский, Аерофлотський); Hresivskyi (Gresovskiy, Грэсовский, Гресівський); Komsomolske (Komsomolskoye, Комсомольское, Комсомольське)	Simferopol Raion	the administrative center of the Republic
Alushta Municipality	Cities: Alushta (Aluşta, Алушта); Urban-type settlements: Partenit (Partenit, Партенит, Партеніт)	Yalta Raion	
Armiansk Municipality	Cities: Armiansk (Ermeni Bazar, Армянск, Армянськ)	Perekop Raion	
City of Dzhankoi	Cities: Dzhankoi (Canköy, Джанкой)	Dzhankoi Raion	
Feodosia Municipality	Cities: Feodosia (Kefe, Феодосия, Феодосія); Urban-type settlements: Koktebel (Köktöbel, Коктебель); Kurortne (Aşağı Otuz, Курортное, Курортне); Ordzhonikidze (Kaygador, Орджоникидзе, Орджонікідзе); Prymorskyi (Hafuz, Приморский, Приморський); Shchebetovka (Otuz, Щебетовка)	Feodosia Raion	
City of Kerch	Cities: Kerch (Keriç, Керчь, Керч)	Kerch Raion	
City of Krasnoperekopsk	Cities: Krasnoperekopsk (Krasnoperekopsk, Красноперекопск, Красноперекопськ)	Perekop Raion	
Saky Municipality	Cities: Saky (Saq, Саки)	Yevpatoria Raion	
Sudak Municipality	Cities: Sudak (Sudaq, Судак); Urban-type settlements: Novyi Svit (Novıy Svet, Новый Свет, Новий Світ)	Feodosia Raion	
Yalta Municipality	Cities: Yalta (Yalta, Ялта); Alupka (Alupka, Алупка); Urban-type settlements: Berehove (Kastropol, Береговое, Берегове); Foros, Crimea (Foros, Форос); Gaspra (Gaspra, Гаспра); Gurzuf (Gurzuf, Гурзуф); Holuba Zatoka (Limena, Голубой Залив, Голуба Затока); Gurzuf (Gurzuf, Гурзуф); Katsiveli (Katsiveli, Кацивели, Кацівелі); Koreiz (Koreiz, Кореиз, Кореїз); Krasnokamianka (Qızıltaş, Краснокаменка, Краснокам'янка); Kurpaty (Kurpatı, Курпаты, Курпати); Livadiya (Livadiya, Ливадия, Лівадія); Massandra (Massandra, Массандра, Масандра); Nikita (Nikita, Никита, Нікіта); Oreanda (Oreanda, Ореанда); Parkove (Yañı Küçükköy, Парковое, Паркове); Ponyzivka (Aşağı Kikineiz, Понизовка, Понизівка); Sanatorne (Melas, Санаторное, Санаторне); Simeiz (Simeiz, Симеиз, Сімеїз); Sovietske (Dolossı, Советское, Совєтське); Vidradne (Mağaraç, Отрадное, Відрадне); Voskhod (Cemiyet, Восход); Vynohradne (Vinogradnoye, Виноградное, Виноградне)	Yalta Raion	
Yevpatoria Municipality	Cities: Yevpatoria (Kezlev, Евпатория, Євпаторія); Urban-type settlements: Myrnyi (Mirnıy, Мирный, Мирний); Novoozerne (Novoozörnoye, Новоозёрное, Новоозерне); Zaozerne (Yalı Moynaq, Заозёрное, Заозерне)	Yevpatoria Raion	
Bakhchysarai Raion(Bağçasaray rayonı, Бахчисарайский район, Бахчисарайський район)	Cities: Bakhchysarai (Bağçasaray, Бахчисарай); Urban-type settlements: Kuibysheve (Albat, Куйбышево, Куйбишеве); Nauchnyi (Nauçnıy, Научный, Научний); Poshtove (Bazarçıq, Почтовое, Поштове)	Bakhchysarai Raion	
Bilohirsk Raion(Qarasuvbazar rayonı, Белогорский район, Білогірський район)	Cities: Bilohirsk (Qarasuvbazar, Белогорск, Білогірськ) Urban-type settlements: Zuya (Zuya, Зуя)	Bilohirsk Raion	
Chornomorske Raion(Aqmeçit rayonı, Черноморский район, Чорноморський район)	Urban-type settlements: Chornomorske (Aqmeçit, Черноморское, Чорноморське)	Yevpatoria Raion	
Dzhankoi Raion (Canköy rayonı, Джанкойский район, Джанкойський район)	Urban-type settlements: Azovske (Qalay, Азовское, Азовське); Vilne (Frayleben, Вольное, Вільне)	Dzhankoi Raion	
Kirovske Raion(İslâm Terek rayonı, Кировский район, Кіровський район)	Cities: Stary Krym (Eski Qırım, Старый Крым, Старий Крим); Urban-type settlements: Kirovske (İslâm Terek, Кировское, Кіровське)	Feodosia Raion	
Krasnohvardiiske Raion (Qurman rayonı, Красногвардейский район, Красногвардійський район)	Urban-type settlements: Krasnohvardiiske (Qurman, Красногвардейское, Красногвардійське); Oktiabrske (Büyük Onlar, Октябрьское, Октябрське)	Kurman Raion	
Krasnoperekopsk Raion (Krasnoperekopsk rayonı, Красноперекопский район, Красноперекопський район)		Perekop Raion	
Lenine Raion (Yedi Quyu rayonı, Ленинский район, Ленінський район)	Cities: Shcholkine (Şçolkino, Щёлкино, Щолкіне); Urban-type settlements: Baherove (Bagerovo, Багерово, Багерове); Lenine (Yedi Quyu, Ленино, Леніне)	Kerch Raion	
Nyzhnohirskyi Raion (Seyitler rayonı, Нижнегорский район, Нижньогірський район)	Urban-type settlements: Nyzhnohirskyi (Seyitler, Нижнегорский, Нижньогірський)	Bilohirsk Raion	
Pervomaiske Raion (Curçı rayonı, Первомайский район, Первомайський район)	Urban-type settlements: Pervomaiske (Curçı, Первомайское, Первомайське)	Kurman Raion	
Rozdolne Raion (Aqşeyh rayonı, Раздольненский район, Роздольненський район)	Urban-type settlements: Novoselivske (Montanay, Новосёловское, Новоселівське); Rozdolne (Aqşeyh, Раздольное, Роздольне)	Perekop Raion	
Saky Raion (Saq rayonı, Сакский район, Сакський район)	Urban-type settlements: Novofedorivka (Novofödorovka, Новофёдоровка, Новофедорівка)	Yevpatoria Raion	
Simferopol Raion (Aqmescit rayonı, Симферопольский район, Сімферопольський район)	Urban-type settlements: Hvardiiske (Sarabuz, Гвардейское, Гвардійське); Molodizhne (Molodöjnoye, Молодёжное, Молодіжне); Mykolaivka (Nikolayevka, Николаевка, Миколаївка)	Simferopol Raion	
Sovietskyi (İçki rayonı, Советский район, Совєтський район)	Urban-type settlements: Sovietskyi (İçki, Советский, Совєтський)	Feodosia Raion	

=== Pre-April 2014 (Ukrainian system: Autonomous Republic of Crimea) ===
- Cities and towns under the Republic's jurisdiction:
  - Simferopol Municipality
    - Towns under the town's jurisdiction:
      - Simferopol (Aqmescit, Симферополь, Сімферополь), the administrative center of the Republic
    - Urban-type settlements under the town's jurisdiction:
      - Ahrarne (Agrarnoye, Аграрное, Аграрне)
      - Aeroflotskyi (Aeroflotskiy, Аэрофлотский, Аерофлотський)
      - Hresivskyi (Gresovskiy, Грэсовский, Гресівський)
      - Komsomolske (Komsomolskoye, Комсомольское, Комсомольське)
  - Alushta Municipality
    - Towns under the town's jurisdiction:
      - Alushta (Aluşta, Алушта)
    - Urban-type settlements under the town's jurisdiction:
      - Partenit (Partenit, Партенит, Партеніт)
  - Armyansk Municipality
    - Towns under the town's jurisdiction:
      - Armyansk (Ermeni Bazar, Армянск, Армянськ)
  - Dzhankoy (Canköy, Джанкой)
  - Feodosia Municipality
    - Towns under the town's jurisdiction:
      - Feodosia (Kefe, Феодосия, Феодосія)
    - Urban-type settlements under the town's jurisdiction:
      - Koktebel (Köktöbel, Коктебель)
      - Kurortne (Aşağı Otuz, Курортное, Курортне)
      - Ordzhonikidze (Kaygador, Орджоникидзе, Орджонікідзе)
      - Prymorskyi (Hafuz, Приморский, Приморський)
      - Shchebetovka (Otuz, Щебетовка)
  - Kerch (Keriç, Керчь, Керч)
  - Krasnoperekopsk (Krasnoperekopsk, Красноперекопск, Красноперекопськ)
  - Saky Municipality
    - Towns under the town's jurisdiction:
      - Saky (Saq, Саки)
  - Sudak Municipality
    - Towns under the town's jurisdiction:
      - Sudak (Sudaq, Судак)
    - Urban-type settlements under the town's jurisdiction:
      - Novyi Svit (Novıy Svet, Новый Свет, Новий Світ)
  - Yalta Municipality
    - Towns under the town's jurisdiction:
      - Yalta (Yalta, Ялта)
      - Alupka (Alupka, Алупка)
    - Urban-type settlements under the town's jurisdiction:
      - Berehove (Kastropol, Береговое, Берегове)
      - Foros, Crimea (Foros, Форос)
      - Gaspra (Gaspra, Гаспра)
      - Gurzuf (Gurzuf, Гурзуф)
      - Holuba Zatoka (Limena, Голубой Залив, Голуба Затока)
      - Gurzuf (Gurzuf, Гурзуф)
      - Katsiveli (Katsiveli, Кацивели, Кацівелі)
      - Koreiz (Koreiz, Кореиз, Кореїз)
      - Krasnokamianka (Qızıltaş, Краснокаменка, Краснокам'янка)
      - Kurpaty (Kurpatı, Курпаты, Курпати)
      - Livadiya (Livadiya, Ливадия, Лівадія)
      - Massandra (Massandra, Массандра, Масандра)
      - Nikita (Nikita, Никита, Нікіта)
      - Oreanda (Oreanda, Ореанда)
      - Parkove (Yañı Küçükköy, Парковое, Паркове)
      - Ponyzivka (Aşağı Kikineiz, Понизовка, Понизівка)
      - Sanatorne (Melas, Санаторное, Санаторне)
      - Simeiz (Simeiz, Симеиз, Сімеїз)
      - Sovietske (Dolossı, Советское, Совєтське)
      - Vidradne (Mağaraç, Отрадное, Відрадне)
      - Voskhod (Cemiyet, Восход)
      - Vynohradne (Vinogradnoye, Виноградное, Виноградне)
  - Yevpatoria Municipality
    - Towns under the town's jurisdiction:
      - Yevpatoria (Kezlev, Евпатория, Євпаторія)
    - Urban-type settlements under the town's jurisdiction:
      - Myrnyi (Mirnıy, Мирный, Мирний)
      - Novoozerne (Novoozörnoye, Новоозёрное, Новоозерне)
      - Zaozerne (Yalı Moynaq, Заозёрное, Заозерне)
- Districts (raions):
  - Bakhchysarai (Bağçasaray rayonı, Бахчисарайский район, Бахчисарайський район)
    - Towns under the district's jurisdiction:
      - Bakhchysarai (Bağçasaray, Бахчисарай)
    - Urban-type settlements under the district's jurisdiction:
      - Kuibysheve (Albat, Куйбышево, Куйбишеве)
      - Nauchnyi (Nauçnıy, Научный, Научний)
      - Poshtove (Bazarçıq, Почтовое, Поштове)
  - Bilohirsk (Qarasuvbazar rayonı, Белогорский район, Білогірський район)
    - Towns under the district's jurisdiction:
      - Bilohirsk (Qarasuvbazar, Белогорск, Білогірськ)
    - Urban-type settlements under the district's jurisdiction:
      - Zuya (Zuya, Зуя)
  - Chornomorske (Aqmeçit rayonı, Черноморский район, Чорноморський район)
    - Urban-type settlements under the district's jurisdiction:
      - Chornomorske (Aqmeçit, Черноморское, Чорноморське)
  - Dzhankoi (Canköy rayonı, Джанкойский район, Джанкойський район)
    - Urban-type settlements under the district's jurisdiction:
      - Azovske (Qalay, Азовское, Азовське)
      - Vilne (Frayleben, Вольное, Вільне)
  - Kirovske (İslâm Terek rayonı, Кировский район, Кіровський район)
    - Towns under the district's jurisdiction:
      - Staryi Krym (Eski Qırım, Старый Крым, Старий Крим)
    - Urban-type settlements under the district's jurisdiction:
      - Kirovske (İslâm Terek, Кировское, Кіровське)
  - Krasnohvardiiske (Qurman rayonı, Красногвардейский район, Красногвардійський район)
    - Urban-type settlements under the district's jurisdiction:
      - Krasnohvardiiske (Qurman, Красногвардейское, Красногвардійське)
      - Oktiabrske (Büyük Onlar, Октябрьское, Октябрське)
  - Krasnoperekopsk (Krasnoperekopsk rayonı, Красноперекопский район, Красноперекопський район)
  - Lenine (Yedi Quyu rayonı, Ленинский район, Ленінський район)
    - Towns under the district's jurisdiction:
      - Shcholkine (Şçolkino, Щёлкино, Щолкіне)
    - Urban-type settlements under the district's jurisdiction:
      - Baherove (Bagerovo, Багерово, Багерове)
      - Lenine (Yedi Quyu, Ленино, Леніне)
  - Nyzhnohirskyi (Seyitler rayonı, Нижнегорский район, Нижньогірський район)
    - Urban-type settlements under the district's jurisdiction:
      - Nyzhnohirskyi (Seyitler, Нижнегорский, Нижньогірський)
  - Pervomaiske (Curçı rayonı, Первомайский район, Первомайський район)
    - Urban-type settlements under the district's jurisdiction:
      - Pervomaiske (Curçı, Первомайское, Первомайське)
  - Rozdolne (Aqşeyh rayonı, Раздольненский район, Роздольненський район)
    - Urban-type settlements under the district's jurisdiction:
      - Novoselivske (Montanay, Новосёловское, Новоселівське)
      - Rozdolne (Aqşeyh, Раздольное, Роздольне)
  - Saky (Saq rayonı, Сакский район, Сакський район)
    - Urban-type settlements under the district's jurisdiction:
      - Novofedorivka (Novofödorovka, Новофёдоровка, Новофедорівка)
  - Simferopol (Aqmescit rayonı, Симферопольский район, Сімферопольський район)
    - Urban-type settlements under the district's jurisdiction:
      - Hvardiiske (Sarabuz, Гвардейское, Гвардійське)
      - Molodizhne (Molodöjnoye, Молодёжное, Молодіжне)
      - Mykolaivka (Nikolayevka, Николаевка, Миколаївка)
  - Sovietskyi (İçki rayonı, Советский район, Совєтський район)
    - Urban-type settlements under the district's jurisdiction:
      - Sovietskyi (İçki, Советский, Совєтський

=== Post-April 2014 (Russian system: Republic of Crimea) ===
Republic of Crimea
Capital: Simferopol
As of 2015:
# of districts (районы)	14
# of cities/towns (города)	16

The Russian system largely inherits the Ukrainian setup, with changes to terminology and minor tweaks on the lower levels.

- Cities and towns under republic's jurisdiction:
  - Simferopol (Симферополь) (capital)
  - Alushta (Алушта)
  - Armyansk (Армянск)
  - Dzhankoy (Джанкой)
  - Feodosiya (Феодосия)
  - Kerch (Керчь)
  - Krasnoperekopsk (Красноперекопск)
  - Saki (Саки)
  - Sudak (Судак)
  - Yalta (Ялта)
    - Towns under the town's jurisdiction:
      - Alupka (Алупка)
  - Yevpatoriya (Евпатория)
- Districts:
  - Bakhchisaraysky (Бахчисарайский)
    - Towns under the district's jurisdiction:
      - Bakhchisaray (Бахчисарай)
  - Belogorsky (Белогорский)
    - Towns under the district's jurisdiction:
      - Belogorsk (Белогорск)
  - Chernomorsky (Черноморский)
  - Dzhankoysky (Джанкойский)
  - Kirovsky (Кировский)
    - Towns under the district's jurisdiction:
      - Stary Krym (Старый Крым)
  - Krasnogvardeysky (Красногвардейский)
  - Krasnoperekopsky (Красноперекопский)
  - Leninsky (Ленинский)
    - Towns under the district's jurisdiction:
      - Shchyolkino (Щёлкино)
  - Nizhnegorsky (Нижнегорский)
  - Pervomaysky (Первомайский)
  - Razdolnensky (Раздольненский)
  - Saksky (Сакский)
  - Simferopolsky (Симферопольский)
  - Sovetsky (Советский)

=== 2020 administrative reforms (Ukrainian system: Autonomous Republic of Crimea) ===
According to the reform of administrative divisions of Ukraine, the municipalities were abolished, and the number of raions reduced. As Crimea was not under Ukrainian control, this new administrative division was not made law, until 7 September 2023 with the removal of a clause in earlier laws about changes only coming into effect after Ukraine re-established control over the peninsula. The following raions exist in the Autonomous Republic of Crimea:

- Bakhchysarai (Бахчисарайський район), the center is in the town of Bakhchysarai;
- Bilohirsk (Білогірський район), the center is in the town of Bilohirsk;
- Dzhankoi (Джанкойський район), the center is in the town of Dzhankoi;
- Feodosia (Феодосійський район), the center is in the town of Feodosia;
- Kerch (Керченський район), the center is in the town of Kerch;
- Kurman (Курманський район), the center is in the urban-type settlement of Kurman;
- Perekop (Перекопський район), the center is in the town of Yany Kapu;
- Simferopol (Сімферопольський район), the center is in the city of Simferopol;
- Yalta (Ялтинський район), the center is in the town of Yalta;
- Yevpatoria (Євпаторійський район), the center is in the town of Yevpatoria.

== Municipal divisions ==
The municipal divisions of the Republic of Crimea are identical with its administrative divisions. All of the administrative districts of the Republic of Crimea are municipally incorporated as municipal districts, and the cities of oblast significance are municipally incorporated as urban okrugs.

The Autonomous Republic of Crimea has no municipal divisions, as the concept does not exist in Ukraine.
