= Nauchnyi =

Nauchnyi Научний
- Urban-type settlement
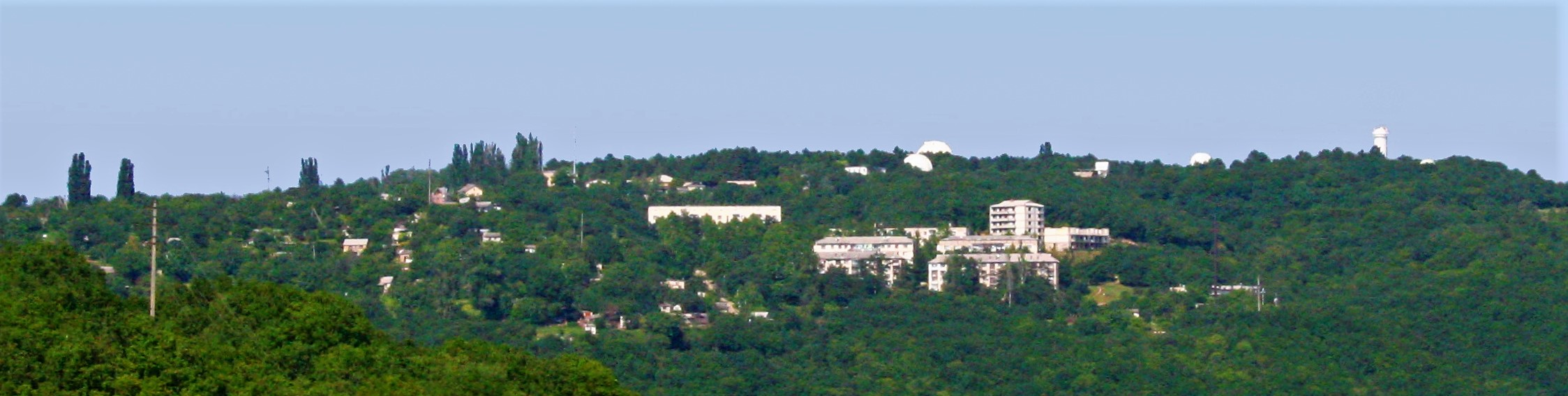
- View of Nauchnyi

- Location of Nauchnyi in Crimea
- Coordinates: 44°43′33″N 34°00′42″E
- Country: Disputed; Russia, Ukraine
- Republic: Crimea
- Raion: Bakhchysarai
- Founded: 1946
- Elevation: 574 m (1,883 ft)

Population (2014)
  - Total: ▼725
- Time zone: UTC+4 (MSK)
- Postal code: 98409
- Area code: +380 6554

Nauchnyi (Ukrainian: Научний; Russian: Научный; Crimean Tatar: Nauçnıy) is an urban-type settlement in the Bakhchysarai Raion of Crimea. Population: 725 (2014 Census).
