= Mykolaivka, Simferopol Raion =

Mykolaivka Миколаївка
- Urban-type settlement
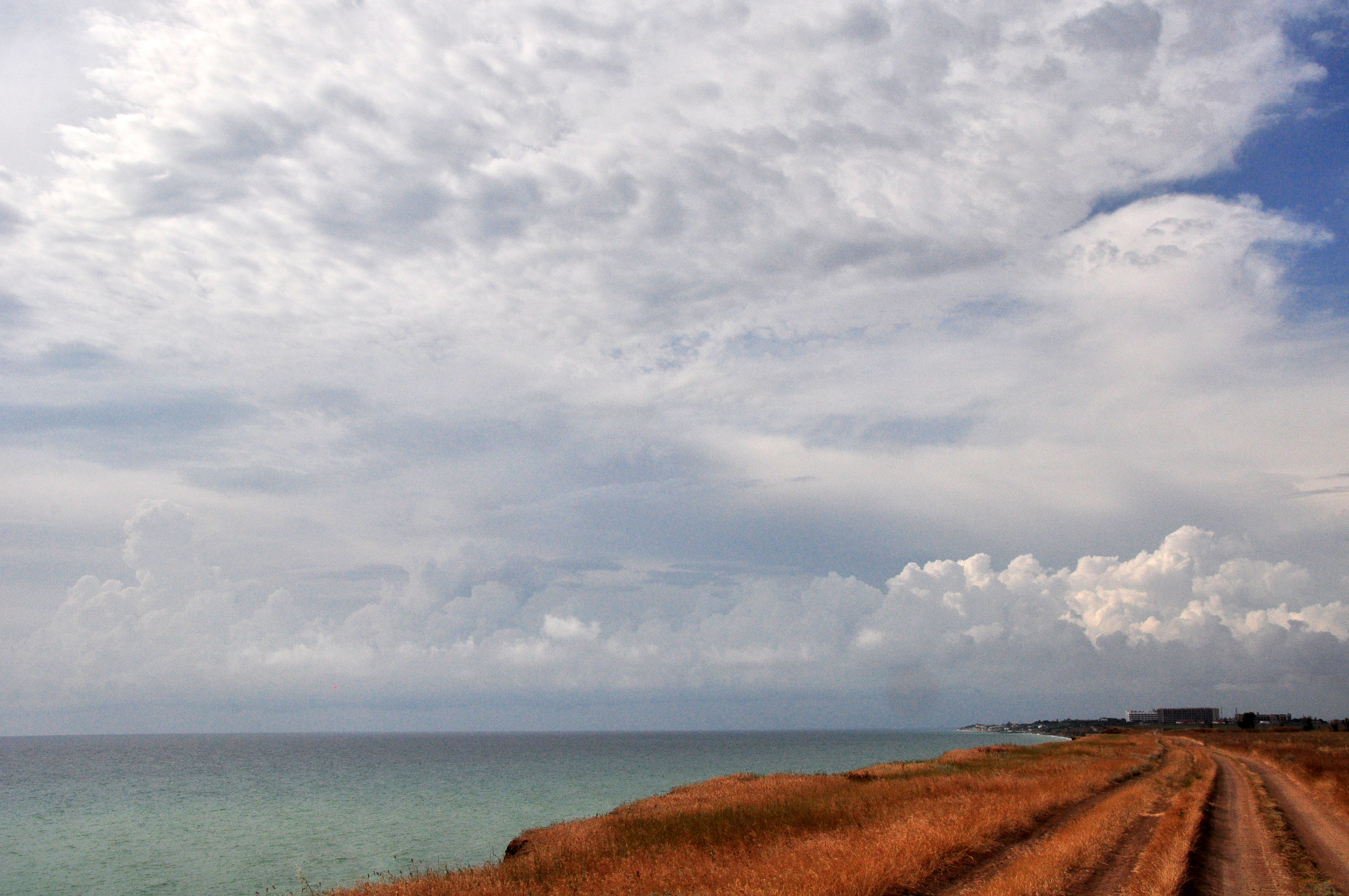
- Coast line between Berehove and Mykolaivka in Crimea

- Location of Mykolaivka Location of Mykolaivka on map of Crimea
- Coordinates: 44°57′43″N 33°36′46″E
- Country: Disputed; Russia, Ukraine
- Republic: Crimea
- Raion: Simferopol Raion
- Founded: 1858

Population (2014)
  - Total: 2,817
- Time zone: UTC+4 (MSK)
- Postcode: 97546
- Area code: +380 652

Mykolaivka (Crimean Tatar: Nikolayevka; Russian: Николаевка; Ukrainian: Миколаївка) is an urban-type settlement (a town) in Simferopol Raion of the Autonomous Republic of Crimea, a territory recognized by a majority of countries as part of Ukraine and incorporated by Russia as the Republic of Crimea. Population: 2,817 (2014 Census).

It is located on shore of Black Sea 40 km from Simferopol. Mykolaivka is considered as a "Simferopol's Beach;" being the closest sea shore it attracts many week-enders from the city.
