= Kuibysheve, Crimea =

Kuibysheve / Albat Куйбишеве / Албат
- Urban-type settlement
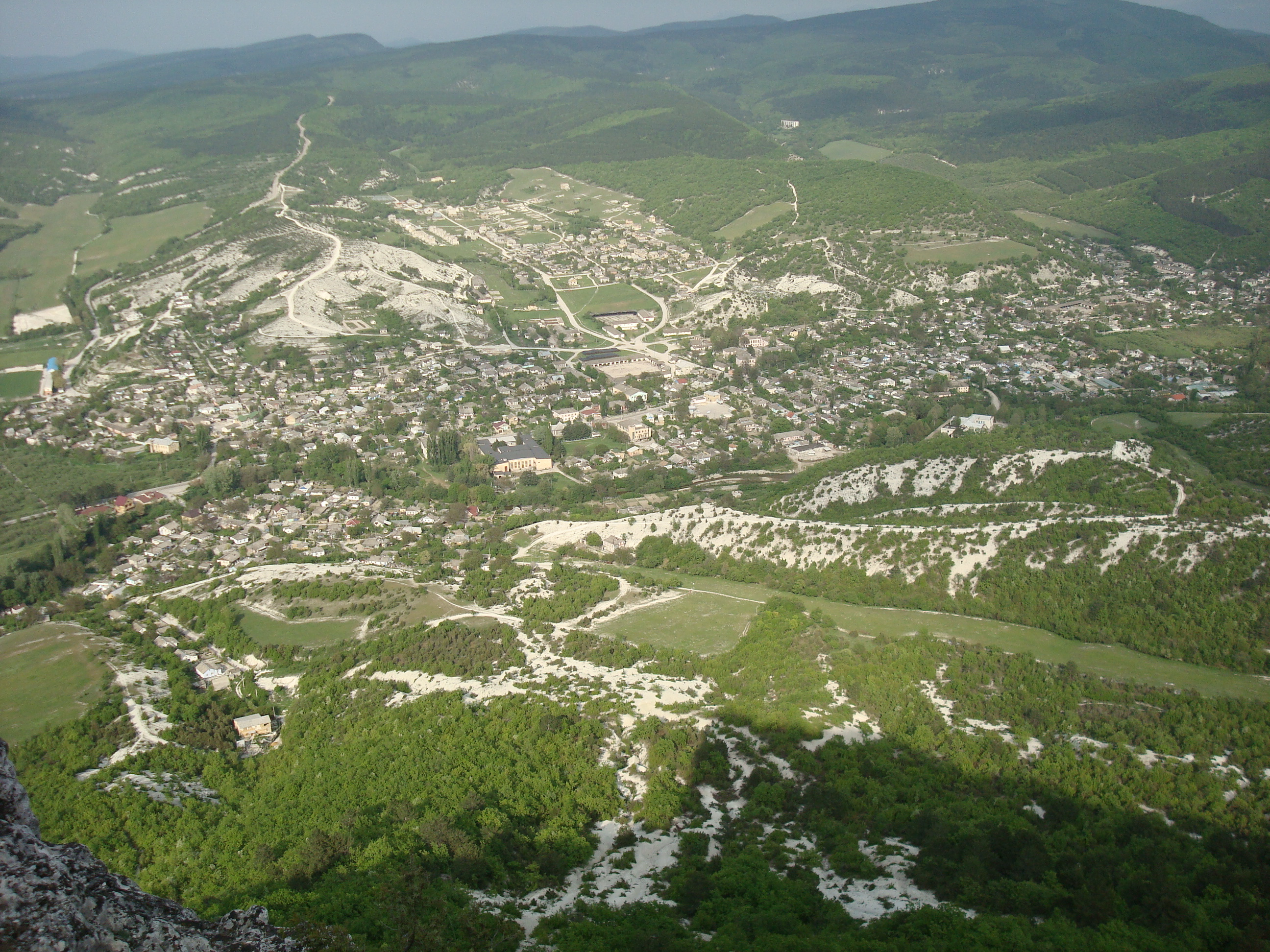
- View of Albat from above
- Interactive map of Kuibysheve / Albat
- Location of Albat in Crimea Kuibysheve / Albat (Crimea)
- Coordinates: 44°37′45″N 33°51′56″E
- Country: Disputed; Russia, Ukraine
- Republic: Crimea
- Raion: Bakhchysarai Raion
- Founded: 1520
- Elevation: 139 m (456 ft)

Population (2014)
  - Total: ▲2,441
- Time zone: UTC+4 (MSK)
- Postal code: 98470
- Area code: +380 6554

Kuibysheve (Ukrainian: Куйбишеве; Russian: Куйбышево) or Albat (Ukrainian: Албат; Russian: Албат; Crimean Tatar: Albat) is an urban-type settlement in the Bakhchysarai Raion of Crimea. Population: 2,441 (2014 Census).

The town features in the Russian language novel, 'Serye Pchely' (translated into English as 'Grey Bees') by Ukrainian writer Andrey Kurkov, published in 2018 but set during the conflict of 2014.

Originally known as Albat, the settlement was renamed Kuibysheve in 1944. On 23 August 2023, the Ukrainian parliament restored the former name. As with many renamed places in Crimea, this has had little practical effect due to the Russian occupation.
