= Hvardiiske, Simferopol Raion =

Hvardiiske Гвардійське
- Urban-type settlement
- Interactive map of Hvardiiske
- Location in Crimea
- Coordinates: 45°06′N 34°00′E
- Raion: Simferopol Raion
- Town founded: 1945 (Hvardiyske); 1873 (Spat)
- Elevation: 146 m (479 ft)

Population (2014)
  - Total: 12,589
- Time zone: UTC+3 (MSK)
- Postal code: 97513
- Area code: +380 652

Hvardiiske (Crimean Tatar: Sarabuz, Russian: Гвардейское, Ukrainian: Гвардійське) is an urban-type settlement in the Simferopol Raion of the Autonomous Republic of Crimea, a territory recognized by a majority of countries as part of Ukraine and incorporated by Russia as part of the Republic of Crimea since the 2014 annexation of Crimea. It had a population of 12,589 (2014 Census).

== Hvardiiske airbase ==
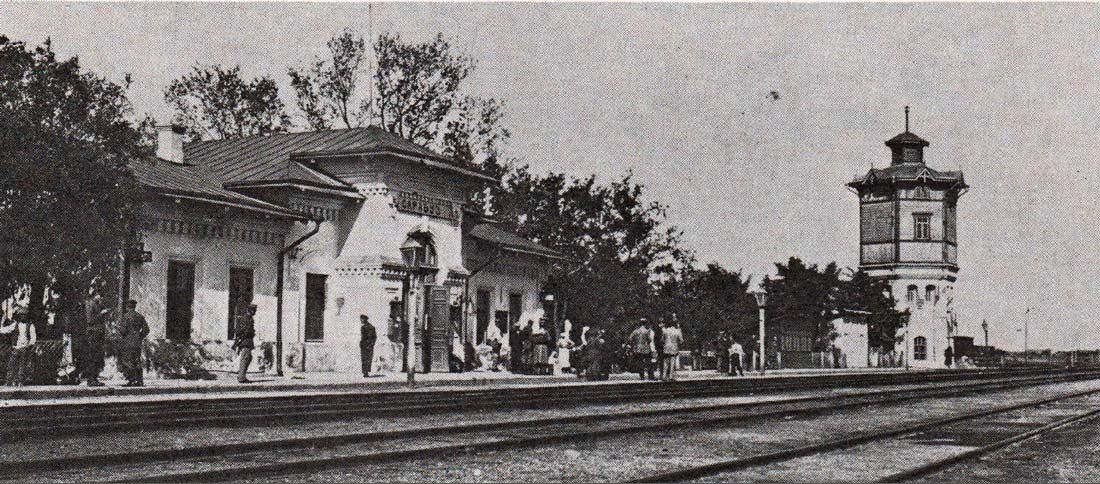
Railway station Sarabuz, end of 19th century

Gvardeyskoye is an airbase next to the town. It was formerly under the jurisdiction of the Russian Black Sea Fleet, and is now controlled by the Russian Air Force.

In June 1990, the 43rd independent Naval Assault Aviation Regiment arrived at the airbase from Choibalsan in Mongolia. Russia annexed Crimea in February and March 2014, and the regiment moved to Saky (air base), also in Crimea, on 1 July 2014.

On August 16, 2022, the airbase was hit by an explosion, and Russian occupation authorities said they were investigating a drone attack on an ammunition depot.

== See also ==
- Kacha, Sevastopol
