= Saky Municipality =

Saky City Municipality Сакська міськрада
- Municipality
- Flag Coat of arms

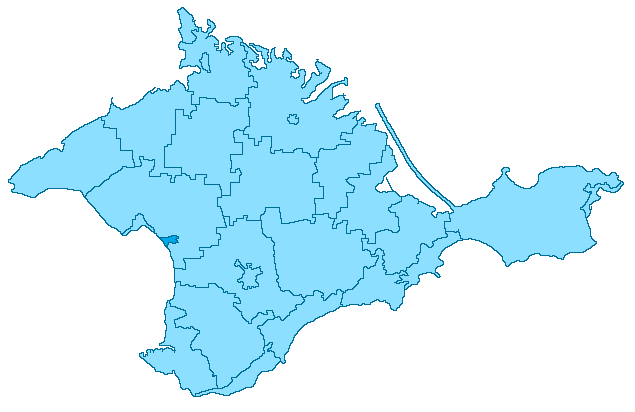
- Location of the municipality (dark blue) in Crimea
- Coordinates: 45°08′01″N 33°34′38″E
- Country: Ukraine
- Location in Ukraine: Autonomous Republic of Crimea
- Location in Russia: (Autonomous Republic of Crimea) Republic of Crimea
- Administrative centre: Saky
- Subdivisions: List: 1 cities; 0 towns; 0 villages

Government
  - City Mayor: Oleh Kliuy (PR)

Area
  - Total: 29 km^{2} (11 sq mi)

Population (2014)
  - Total: 25,146
  - Density: 870/km^{2} (2,200/sq mi)
- Time zone: UTC+3 (MSK)
- Dialing code: +380 6563
- Occupied by: Russia
- Website: http://saki-rada.gov.ua

The Saky City Municipality (Ukrainian: Сакська міськрада, translit. Saks'ka mis'krada) is one of the 25 regions of the Crimean Peninsula, internationally recognized as part of Ukraine, but currently occupied by Russia. It is on the western coast of Crimea on the Black Sea's shore. Its administrative centre is the city of Saky. In 2014, the population stood at 25,146.

Unlike in the other regions and municipalities of Crimea which contain a number of other settlements under its jurisdiction, the Saky municipality only consists of its administrative center Saky.

== Name ==
The Saky City Municipality is also known by two other native official names; in Russian as Sakskiy gorsovet (Сакский горсовет), and in Crimean Tatar as Saq şeer şurası. Colloquially, the municipality is known as "the territory governed by the Saky City Council" (Ukrainian: Сакська міська рада).

== Administrative divisions ==
Within the framework of administrative divisions of Russia, Saky is, together with a number of rural localities, incorporated separately as the "town of republican significance of Saki"—an administrative unit with the status equal to that of the districts. As a municipal division, the town of republican significance of Saki is incorporated as "Saki Urban Okrug".

Within the framework of administrative divisions of Ukraine, Saky is incorporated as the "town of republican significance of Saky". Ukraine does not have municipal divisions.

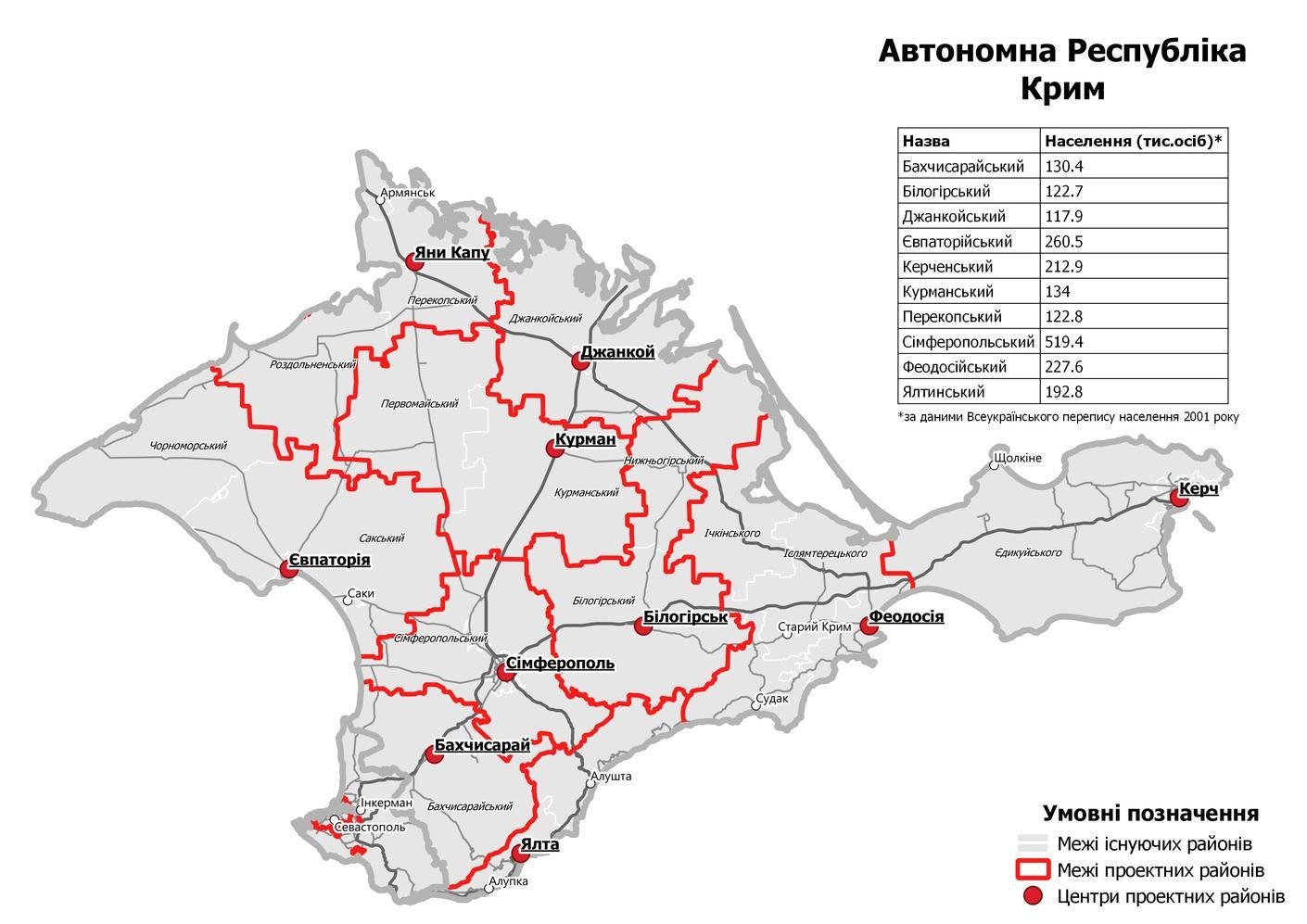
In July 2020, the Verkhovna Rada approved an administrative reform in Crimea

=== 2020 Ukrainian administrative reform ===
In July 2020, Ukraine conducted an administrative reform throughout its de jure territory. This included Crimea, which was, and still is, occupied by Russia. Crimea was reorganized from 14 raions and 11 municipalities into 10 raions, with municipalities abolished altogether. Saky Municipality was abolished, with its territories to become a part of Yevpatoria Raion, but this has not been implemented due to the Russian occupation.

== Government ==
The Saky City Council's members are elected every four years, with 21 councillors elected in single-mandate districts, and 21 councillors in a multiple mandate district.

== Demographics ==
The Saky municipality's population was 28,522 as of the 2001 Ukrainian Census and 25,146 in 2014 according to the 2014 Crimean Census.

The region's nationality composition in the 2001 census was:

- Russians – 65.1 percent
- Ukrainians – 24.3 percent
- Crimean Tatars – 5.8 percent
- All other nationalities – 4.8 percent.
