= Berehove, Yalta Municipality, Crimea =

Berehove Берегове
- Urban-type settlement
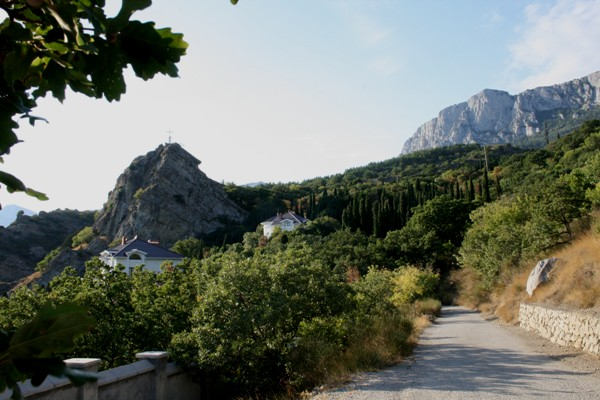
- Crimean Mountains and nature near Berehove

- Location of Berehove in Crimea
- Coordinates: 44°24′28″N 33°52′06″E
- Country: Ukraine
- Republic: Crimea
- Municipality: Yalta Municipality
- Town status: 1971

Government
  - Mayor: Kryrylo Kostenko

Area
  - Total: 0.2685 km^{2} (0.1037 sq mi)
- Elevation: 77 m (253 ft)

Population (2014)
  - Total: 374
  - Density: 1,390/km^{2} (3,610/sq mi)
- Time zone: UTC+4 (MSK)
- Postal code: 98687
- Area code: +380 654
- Climate: Cfa / Csa

Berehove (Ukrainian: Берегове; Russian: Береговое; Crimean Tatar: Kastropol from Greek: Καστρόπολις, romanized: Kastròpolis, lit. 'castle-city') is an urban-type settlement (Note: Since the abolishment of urban-type settlements in Ukraine in 2023, it is de jure a rural settlement.) in the Yalta Municipality of the Autonomous Republic of Crimea, a territory recognized by a majority of countries as part of Ukraine and annexed by Russia as the Republic of Crimea.

Berehove is located on Crimea's southern shore at an elevation of 77 metres (253 ft). The settlement is located 10.5 km (6.5 mi) west from Simeiz, which it is administratively subordinate to. Its population was 478 in the 2001 Ukrainian census. Current population: 374 (2014 Census).

== Demographics ==
According to the Ukrainian national census in 2001, Berehove had a population of 478 inhabitants. It is estimated that Ukrainians constitute a majority in the settlement, followed by a large ethnic Russian minority and smaller Belarusian and Crimean Tatar communities. The majority of all non-Russian ethnic groups in the town speaks the Russian language as their primary tongue, with the only exception being the Crimean Tatar community. The exact native language composition was as follows:

First languages in Berehove
	percent
Russian	77.2%
Ukrainian	21.8%
Belarusian	0.4%
Crimean Tatar	0.2%
others	0.4%
