= Parkove =

Parkove Паркове
- Urban-type settlement
- Location of Parkove in Crimea
- Coordinates: 44°24′14″N 33°54′57″E
- Republic: Crimea
- Municipality: Yalta Municipality
- Town status: 1971

Area
  - Total: 1.4429 km^{2} (0.5571 sq mi)
- Elevation: 102 m (335 ft)

Population (2014)
  - Total: 403
  - Density: 279/km^{2} (723/sq mi)
- Time zone: UTC+4 (MSK)
- Postal code: 98683
- Area code: +380 654
- Climate: Cfb
- Website: http://rada.gov.ua/

Parkove (Ukrainian: Паркове; Russian: Парковое; Crimean Tatar: Yañı Küçükköy) is an urban-type settlement in the Yalta Municipality of the Autonomous Republic of Crimea, a territory recognized by a majority of countries as part of Ukraine and annexed by Russia as the Republic of Crimea.

Parkove is located on Crimea's southern shore at an elevation of 102 metres (335 ft). The settlement is located 8.5 km (5.3 mi) west from Simeiz, which it is administratively subordinate to. Its population was 481 in the 2001 Ukrainian census. Current population: 403 (2014 Census).
