= Poshtove, Crimea =

Poshtove Поштове
- Urban-type settlement
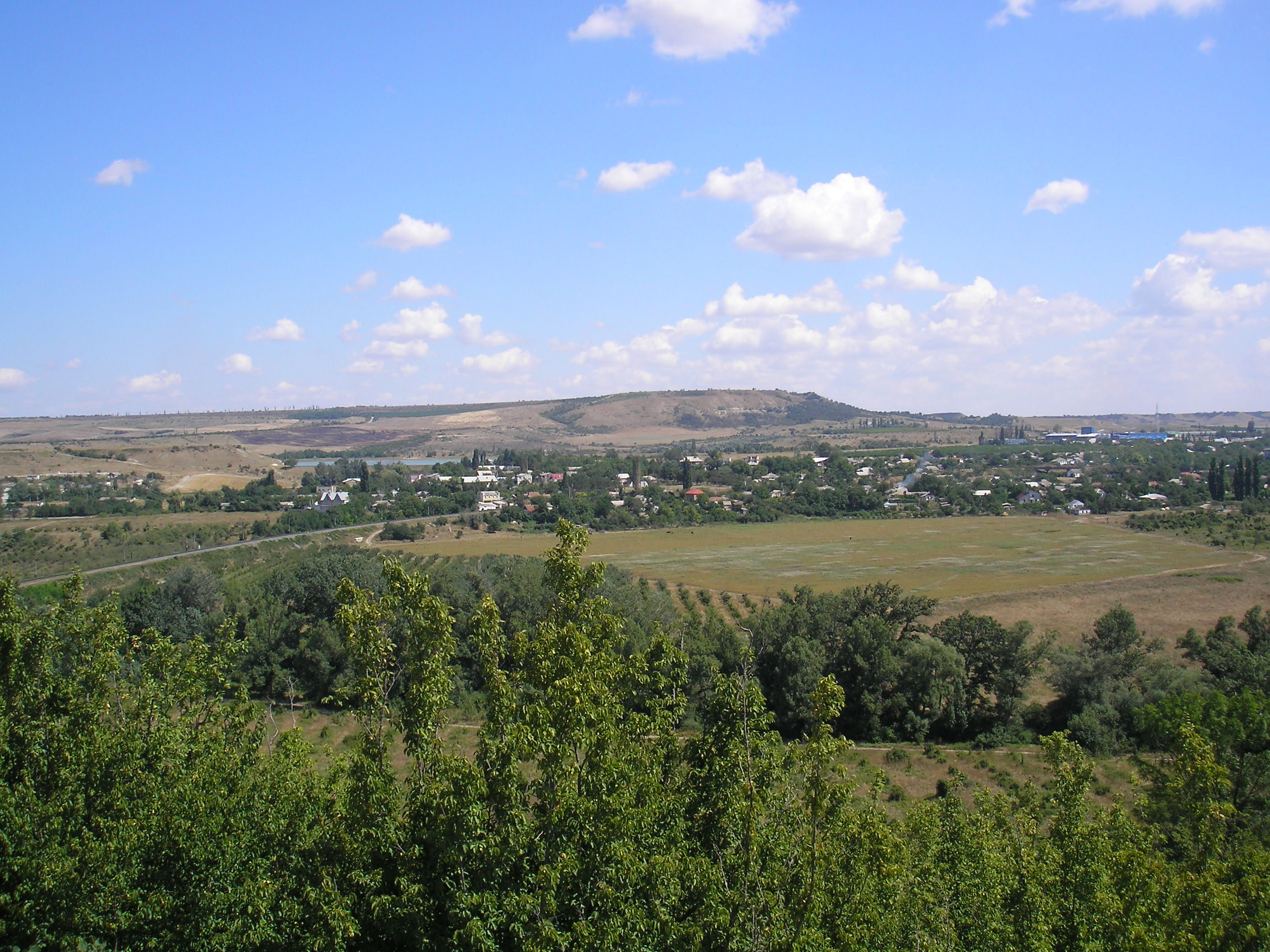
- View of Poshtove

- Location of Poshtove in Crimea
- Coordinates: 44°50′12″N 33°57′48″E
- Country: Disputed; Russia, Ukraine
- Republic: Crimea
- Raion: Bakhchysarai
- Founded: 1784
- Elevation: 180 m (590 ft)

Population (2014)
  - Total: ▼3,086
- Time zone: UTC+4 (MSK)
- Postal code: 98420
- Area code: +380 6554

Poshtove (Ukrainian: Поштове; Russian: Почтовое; Crimean Tatar: Bazarçıq) is an urban-type settlement in the Bakhchysarai Raion of Crimea. Population: 3,086 (2014 Census).

== Gallery ==
The Romanov imperial family at the Alma (now Poshtove) railway station on March 27, 1914

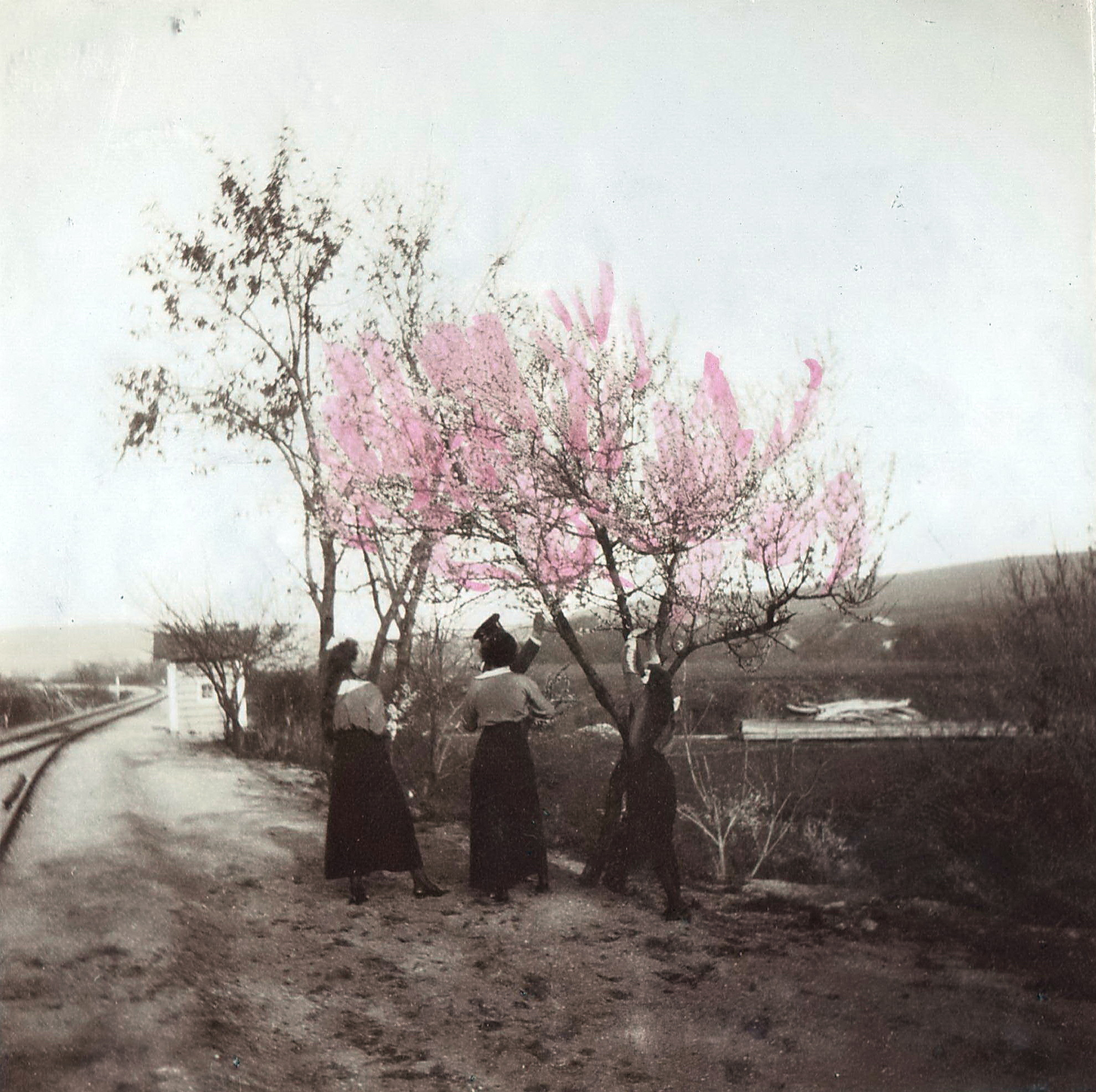

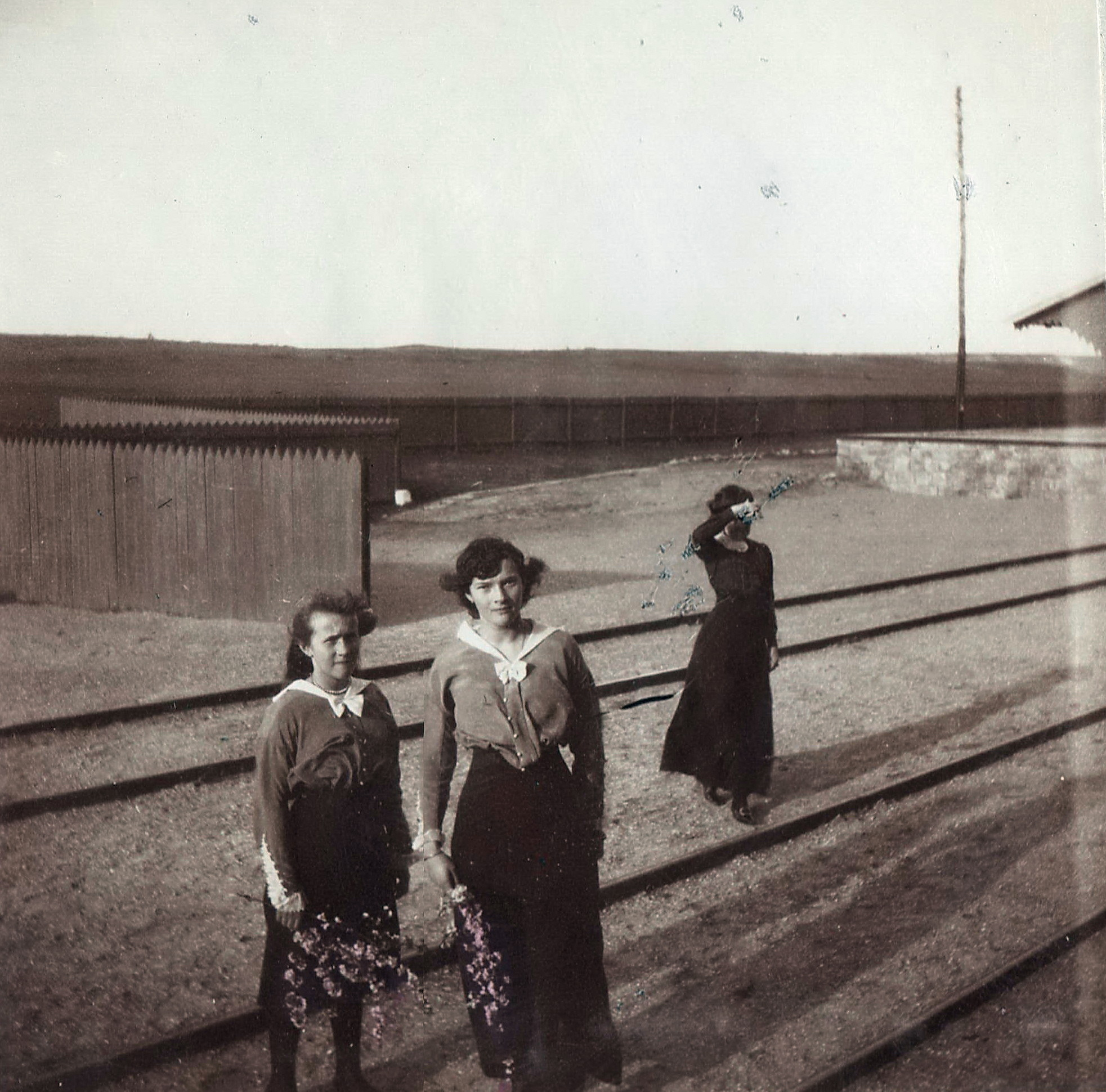

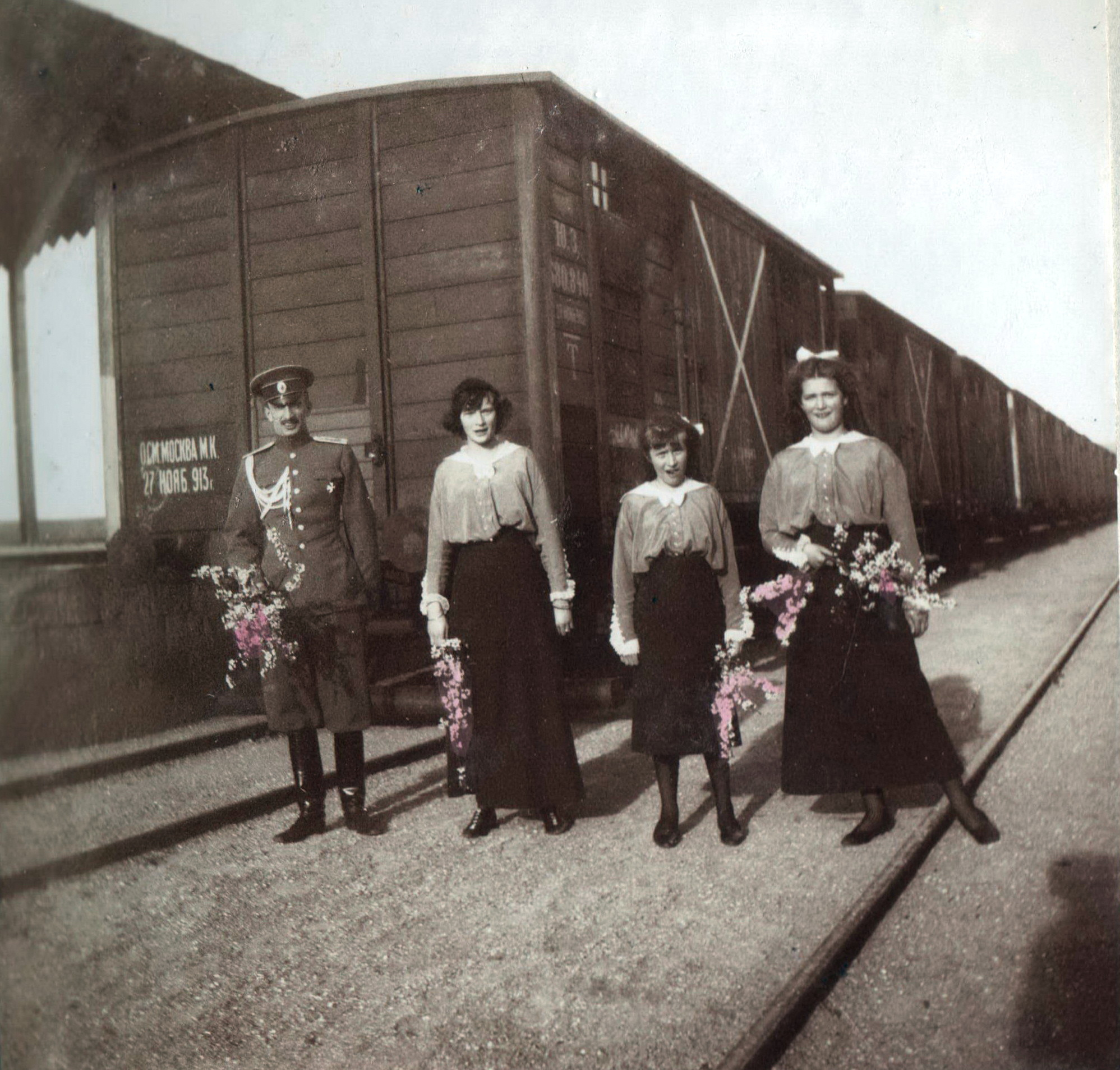

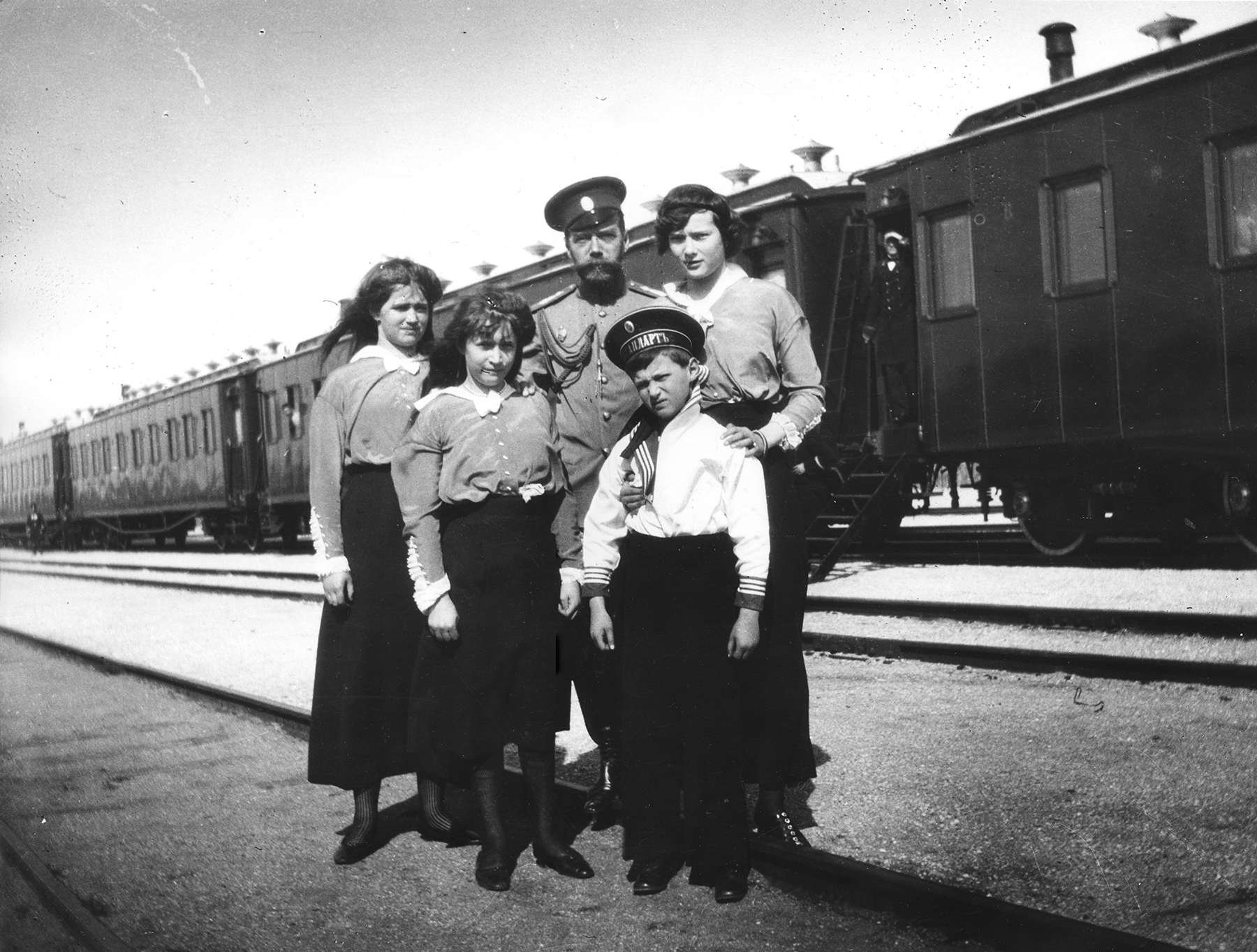
