= Ordzhonikidze, Crimea =

Ordzhonikidze Орджонікідзе
- Urban-type settlement
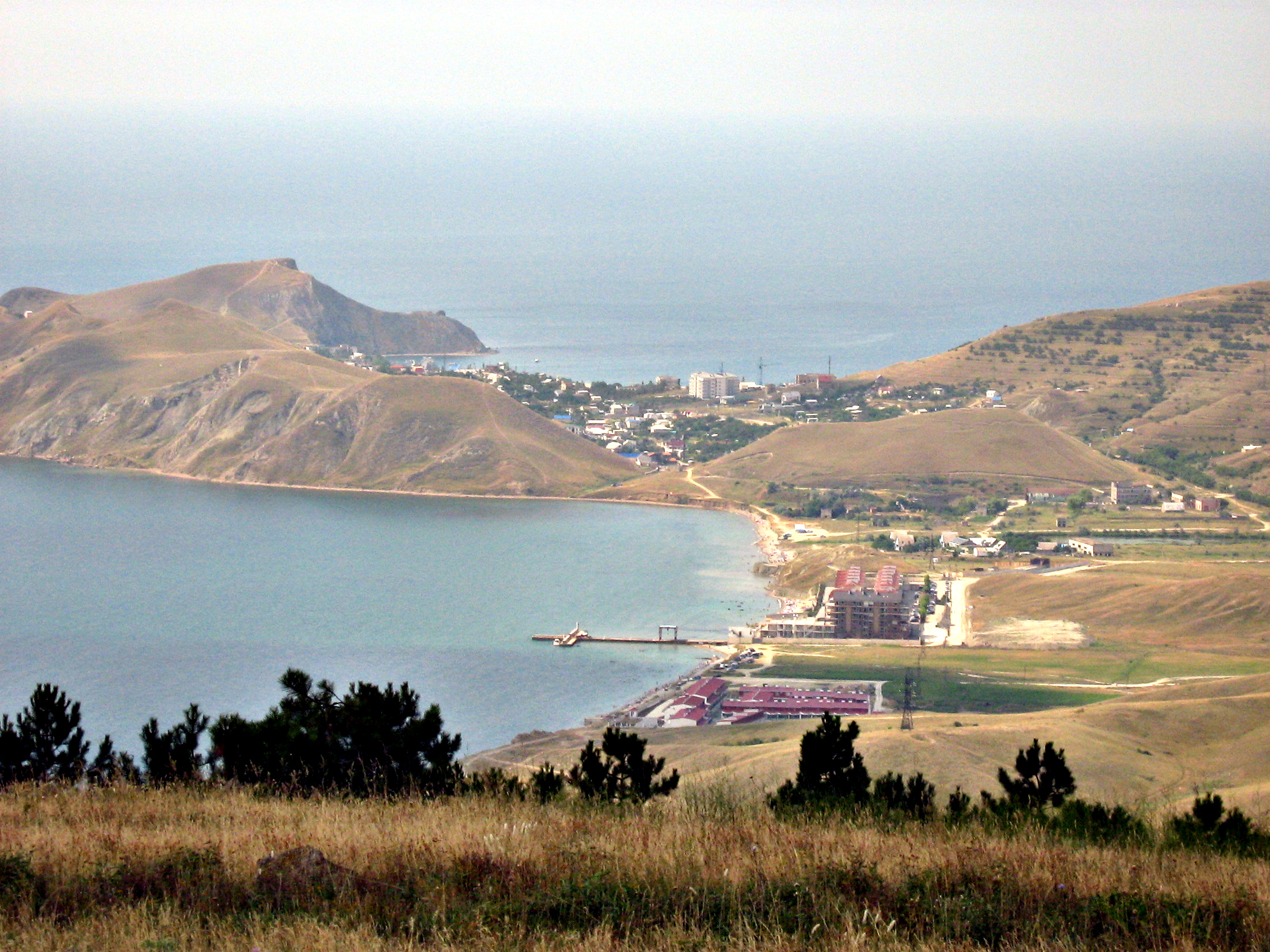
- Interactive map of Ordzhonikidze
- Location of Ordzhonikidze in Crimea
- Coordinates: 44°57′49″N 35°21′28″E
- Country: Disputed; Russia, Ukraine
- Republic: Crimea
- Raion: Feodosia
- Elevation: 20 m (66 ft)

Population (2014)
  - Total: ▼2,650
- Time zone: UTC+4 (MSK)
- Postal code: 98184
- Area code: +380 6562

Ordzhonikidze (Ukrainian: Орджонікідзе; Russian: Орджоникидзе) or Kaihador (Ukrainian: Кайгадор; Crimean Tatar: Kaygador) is an urban-type settlement in the Feodosia Municipality of Crimea. Population: 2,650 (2014 Census).
