= Shchebetovka =

Shchebetovka Щебетовка
- Urban-type settlement
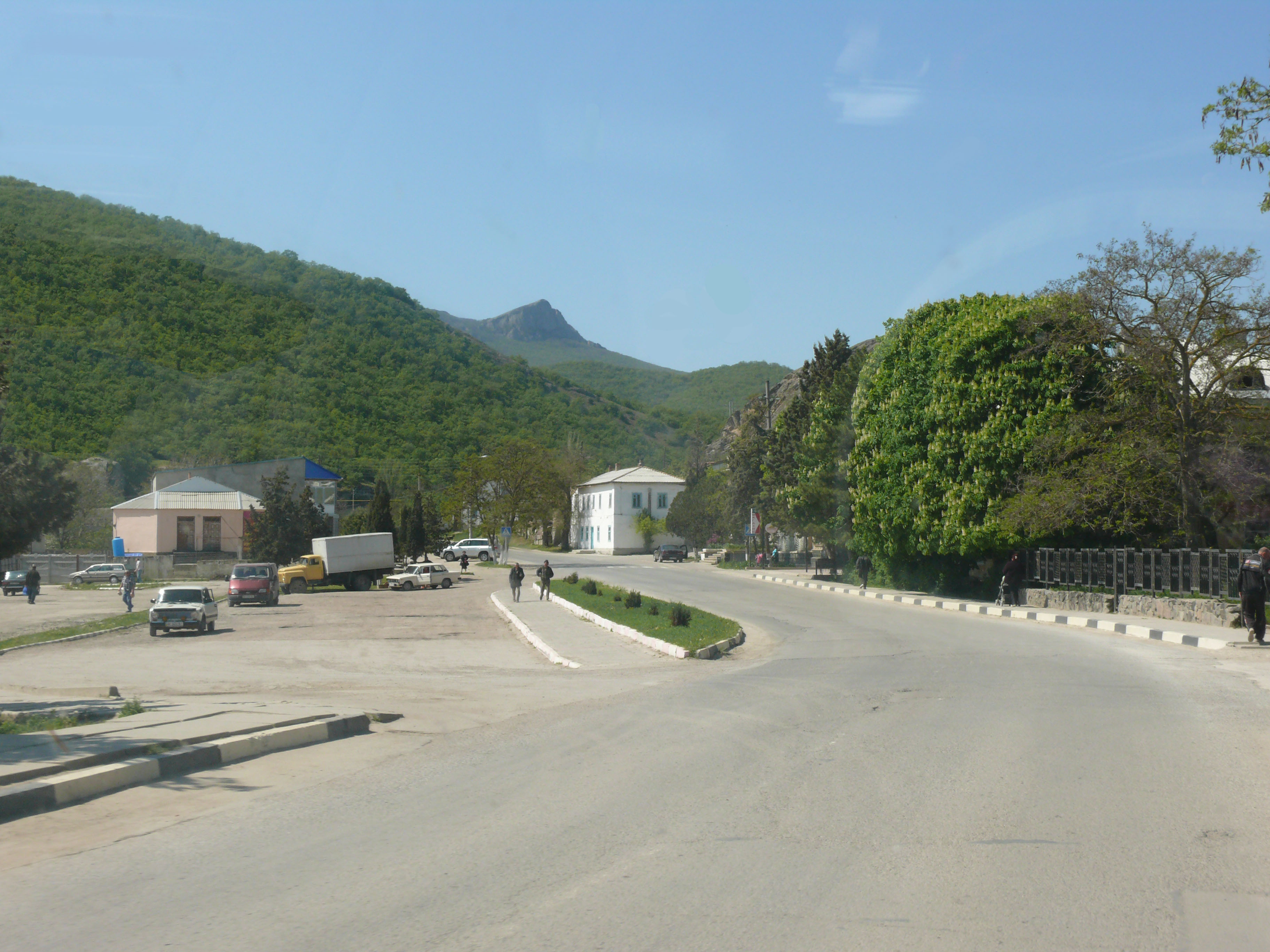

- Location of Ordzhonikidze in Crimea
- Coordinates: 44°56′20″N 35°09′28″E
- Country: Disputed; Russia, Ukraine
- Republic: Crimea
- Raion: Feodosia

Area
  - Total: 4.91 km^{2} (1.90 sq mi)
- Elevation: 79 m (259 ft)

Population (2014)
  - Total: 3,442 ▼
  - Density: 701/km^{2} (1,820/sq mi)
- Time zone: UTC+4 (MSK)
- Postal code: 98187
- Area code: +380 6562

Shchebetovka (Ukrainian: Щебетовка; Russian: Щебетовка; Crimean Tatar: Otuz) is an urban-type settlement in the Feodosia Municipality of Crimea. Population: 3,442 (2014 Census).
