= Molodizhne, Simferopol Raion =

Molodizhne Молодіжне
- Urban-type settlement
- Location in Crimea
- Coordinates: 45°00′N 34°03′E
- Country: Disputed; Russia, Ukraine
- Republic: Crimea
- Raion: Simferopol Raion
- Town founded: 1972

Area
  - Total: 0.45 km^{2} (0.17 sq mi)
- Elevation: 300 m (980 ft)

Population (2014)
  - Total: 7,597
- Time zone: UTC+3 (MSK)
- Postal code: 97501
- Area code: +380 652

Molodizhne (Crimean Tatar: Molodöjnoye; Russian: Молодёжное; Ukrainian: Молодіжне) is an urban-type settlement in Simferopol Raion of the Autonomous Republic of Crimea, a territory recognized by a majority of countries as part of Ukraine and incorporated by Russia as the Republic of Crimea. Population: 7,597 (2014 Census).
