= Holuba Zatoka =

Holuba Zatoka Голубой Залив
- Urban-type settlement
- Location of Holuba Zatoka in Crimea
- Coordinates: 44°25′11″N 33°59′20″E
- Republic: Crimea
- Municipality: Yalta Municipality
- Founded: 1864
- Town status: 1971

Area
  - Total: 1.2239 km^{2} (0.4726 sq mi)
- Elevation: 418 m (1,371 ft)

Population (2014)
  - Total: 615
  - Density: 502/km^{2} (1,300/sq mi)
- Time zone: UTC+4 (MSK)
- Postal code: 98684
- Area code: +380 654
- Climate: Cfa

Holuba Zatoka (Ukrainian: Голуба Затока; Russian: Голубой Залив; Crimean Tatar: Limena from greek Limèn, Λιμήν, "port") is an urban-type settlement in the Yalta Municipality of the Autonomous Republic of Crimea, a territory recognized by a majority of countries as part of Ukraine and annexed by Russia as the Republic of Crimea.

The settlement was first mentioned in written documents in 1864 when it was called Limena (Ukrainian: Лімена). It was known by that name until 1945 when it was changed to its current name. In 1971, the settlement received the status of an urban-type settlement.

Holuba Zatoka is located on Crimea's southern shore at an elevation of 418 metres (1,371 ft). The settlement is located 2.2 km (1.4 mi) west from Simeiz, which it is administratively subordinate to. Its population was 363 in the 2001 Ukrainian census. Current population: 615 (2014 Census).
