= Azovske =

Urban-type settlement in Crimea

Azovske Азовське
- Urban-type settlement
- Location of Dzhankoy within Crimea
- Coordinates: 45°35′29″N 34°34′03″E
- Country: Russian-occupied Ukraine
- Republic: Crimea
- Raion: Dzhankoy Raion

Area
  - Total: 4.6 km^{2} (1.8 sq mi)
- Elevation: 26 m (85 ft)

Population (2014)
  - Total: 3,649
- Time zone: UTC+4 (MSK)
- Area code: +380-6564
- Climate: Cfa

Azovske (Crimean Tatar: Qalay, Russian: Азовское, Ukrainian: Азовське) is an urban-type settlement in Dzhankoi Raion, to the southeast of the town of Dzhankoi in northeastern Crimea, along highway E97. Population: 3,649 (2014 Census). It is part of Russian-occupied Ukraine.

== History ==
The village was inhabited in the Bronze Age (3rd and 2nd millennium BCE). This is evidenced by the excavation of 15 mounds in the immediate vicinity of Azovske. At the time of the annexation of Crimea to Russia in 1783 there was a small village in the vicinity named Kalay. In 1892, after the construction of the railroad to Feodosia, Kalay railway station was established. In the early 20th century the village grew, with about ten retail businesses, and numerous new homes.

In the period from 1935 to 1962 it became a district center and was named Azovske in 1944. A knitting factory, repair shops, a milling plant, a small winery, a meat and dairy plant, a dairy, brick and tile factory and a power plant built in Azovske saw it develop into a fair-sized settlement, reaching a population of 1607 people in 1940. During the Great Patriotic War, the village was occupied by Germans from November 1, 1941, to April 10, 1944. In May 1944, the native population was deported. Azovske became an urban-type settlement in 1957, and in 1962 the district of the same name was dissolved and most of its territory was incorporated into the Dzhankoi Raion.

In 2014, it was invaded by Russia.

== Economy ==
Azovske operates Azov Distillery, the WTO "Azovets" (woodworking and sewing production), and since 1962 it has operated the Azovske district power station, which serves the entire region. Residents of Azovske are served with a clinic, district hospital, nursery, a kindergarten, and there is a general school and children's music school.

=== Transportation ===
There is a railway station on the railway connecting Dzhankoi and Vladislavovka. Before the annexation of Crimea, the trains which followed from mainland Ukraine to Kerch and Feodosia were calling there. After the annexation, all these trains were cancelled.

Azovske has an easy access to the road which connects Dzhankoi and Feodosia. By minor paved roads it is also connected to nearby rural localities such as Ozerki, Krasnodolne, and Prostorne.
