= Vilne, Dzhankoi Raion =

Urban-type settlement in Crimea

Vilne Вільне
- Urban-type settlement
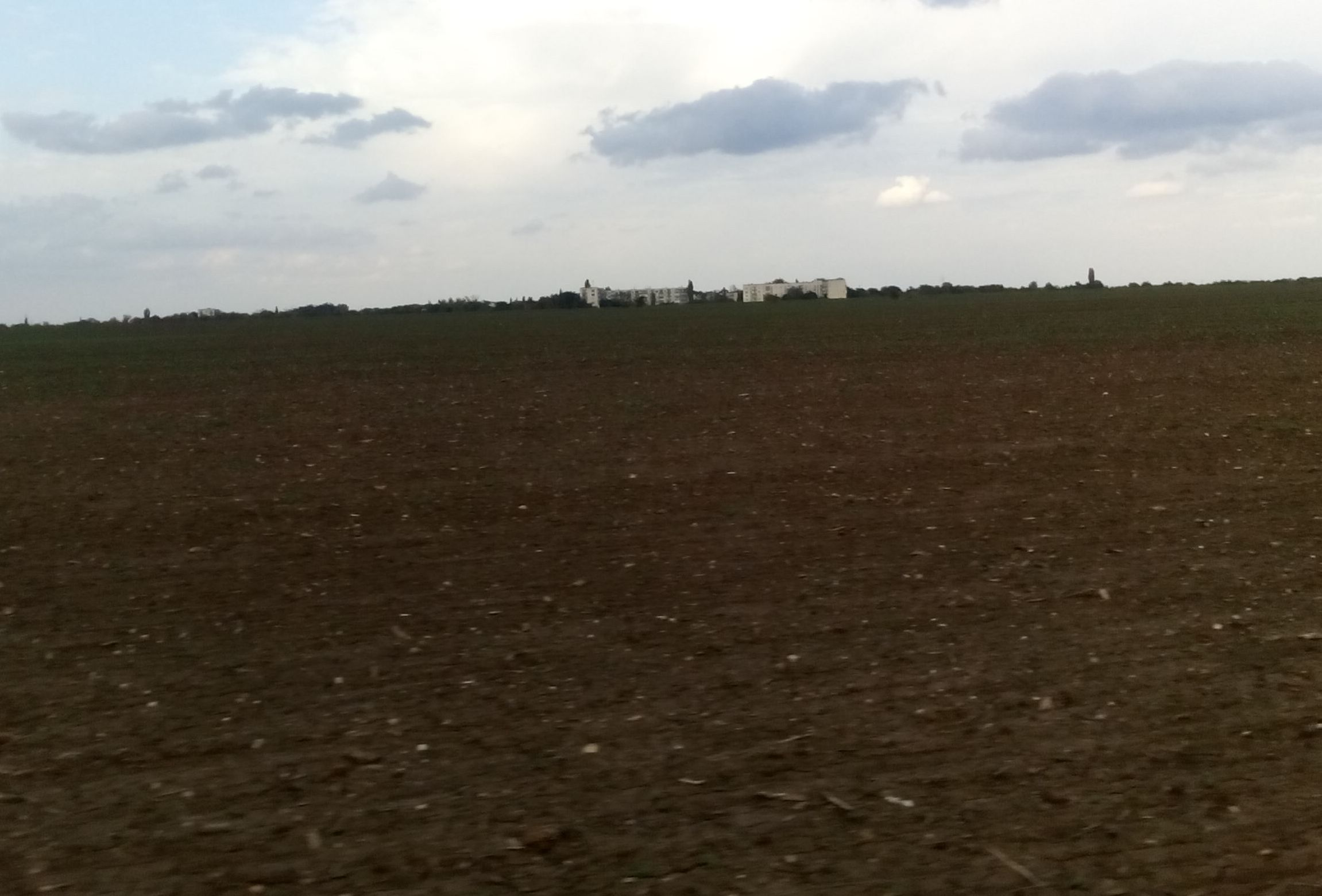
- View of Vilne

- Location of Vilne in Crimea Vilne (Crimea)
- Coordinates: 45°33′55″N 34°18′25″E
- Country: Territory of Ukraine occupied by Russia
- Republic: Crimea
- Raion: Dzhankoi
- Elevation: 42 m (138 ft)

Population (2014)
  - Total: ▼1,969
- Time zone: UTC+4 (MSK)
- Postal code: 96186
- Area code: +380 6564-59

Vilne (Ukrainian: Вільне; Russian: Вольное; Crimean Tatar: Frayleben) is an urban-type settlement in the Dzhankoi Raion of Crimea. Population: 1,969 (2014 Census).
