= Katsiveli =

Katsiveli Кацівелі
- Urban-type settlement
- Location of Katsiveli in Crimea
- Coordinates: 44°23′46″N 33°58′16″E
- Republic: Crimea
- Municipality: Yalta Municipality
- Town status: 1976

Area
  - Total: 0.6965 km^{2} (0.2689 sq mi)
- Elevation: 68 m (223 ft)

Population (2014)
  - Total: 529 ▼
  - Density: 760/km^{2} (1,970/sq mi)
- Time zone: UTC+4 (MSK)
- Postal code: 98688
- Area code: +380 654
- Climate: Cfa
- Website: http://rada.gov.ua/

Katsiveli (Ukrainian: Кацівелі; Russian: Кацивели; Crimean Tatar: Katsiveli, Greek: Κατσιβέλι) is an urban-type settlement in the Yalta Municipality of the Autonomous Republic of Crimea, a territory recognized by a majority of countries as part of Ukraine and illegally annexed by Russia as the Republic of Crimea.

Katsiveli is located on Crimea's southern shore at an elevation of 68 metres (223 ft). The settlement is located 2.5 km (1.6 mi) west from the town of Simeiz, which it is administratively subordinate to. Its population was 658 as of the 2001 Ukrainian census. As of the 2014 census in Crimea, its population had dropped to 529.
