= Vynohradne =

Vynohradne Виноградне
- Urban-type settlement
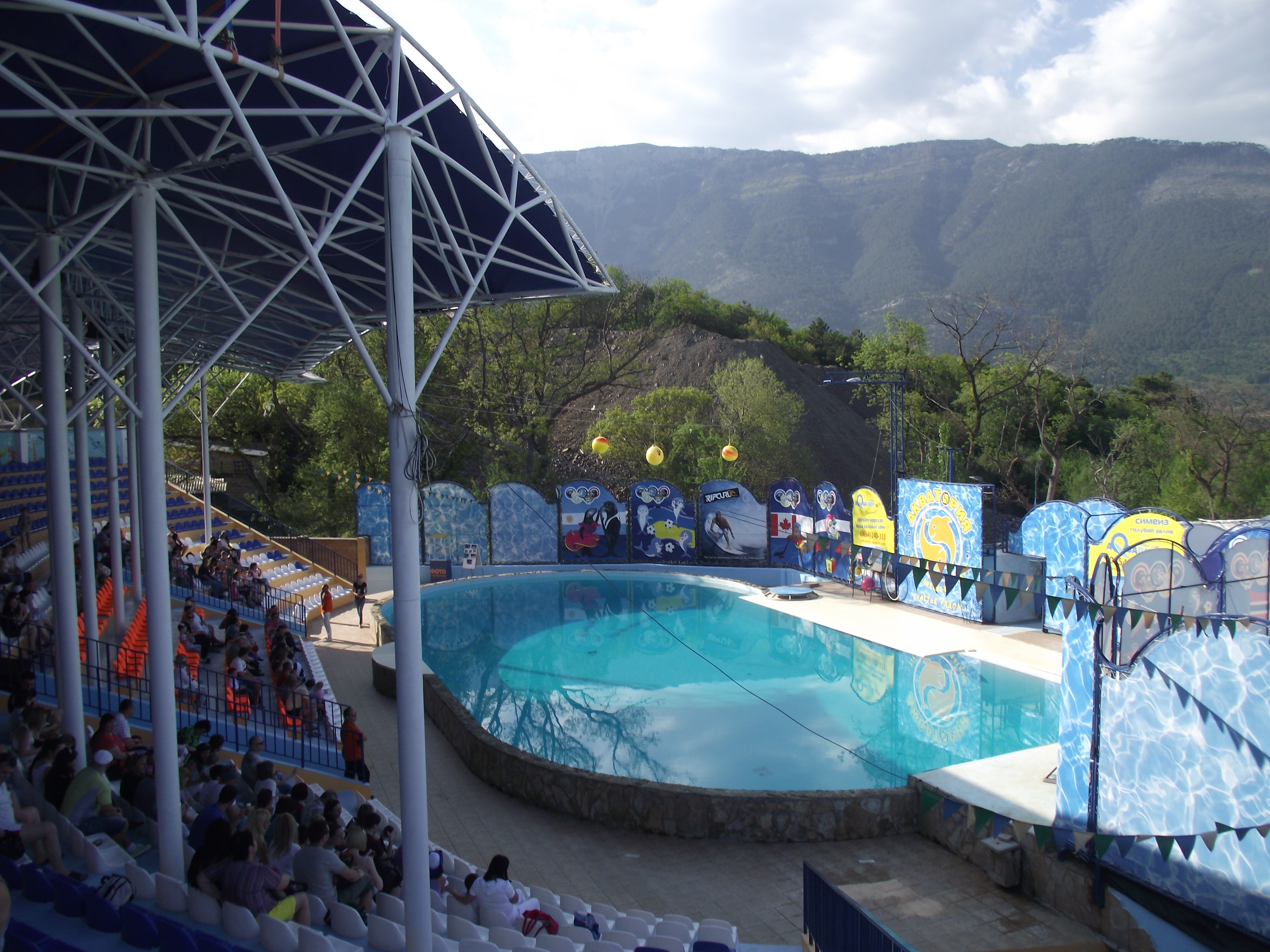

- Location of Vynohradne in Crimea
- Coordinates: 44°28′42″N 34°08′30″E
- Republic: Crimea
- Municipality: Yalta Municipality
- Town status: 1971
- Elevation: 171 m (561 ft)

Population (2014)
  - Total: 1,494
- Time zone: UTC+4 (MSK)
- Postal code: 98657
- Area code: +380 654

Vynohradne (Ukrainian: Виноградне; Russian: Виноградное; Crimean Tatar: Vinogradnoye) is an urban-type settlement in the Yalta Municipality of the Autonomous Republic of Crimea, a territory recognized by a majority of countries as part of Ukraine and annexed by Russia as the Republic of Crimea.

Vynohradne is located on Crimea's southern shore at an elevation of 171 metres (561 ft). The settlement is located 3.5 km (2.2 mi) east from Yalta. It is administratively subordinate to the Livadiya Settlement Council. Its population was 1,151 in the 2001 Ukrainian census. Current population: 1,494 (2014 Census).
