= Mount Kosh-Kaya =

Mountain in Crimea

Coordinates: 44°24′13.80″N 33°59′37.84″E

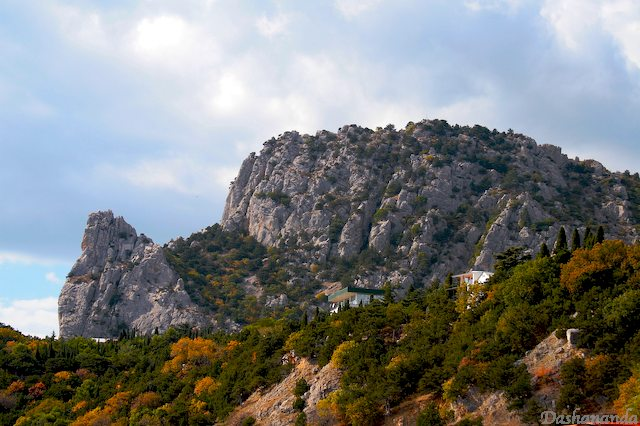
Mt. Koshka

Mount Koshka (Russian: Гора Кошка, Кош-Кая, Соколиная скала; Ukrainian: Гора Кішка; Crimean Tatar: Qoş qaya) is a mountain in the Crimean Mountains near the settlement of Simeiz within the Greater Yalta metropolitan area. The original name in the Crimean Tatar language means "double rock", while the Russian name means "cat", as the shape of the mountain resembles a lying cat. The height is 254 metres.

Atop Koshka mountain is situated Simeiz observatory at the level of 360m above sea level at southern mountainside of the Crimean mountains.
