= Vidradne, Crimea =

Otradnoye/Vidradne Отрадное/Відрадне
- Urban-type settlement
- Location of Vidradne in Crimea
- Coordinates: 44°30′21″N 34°13′01″E
- Republic: Crimea
- Municipality: Yalta
- Town status: 1971

Government
  - Mayor: Zhanna Yatsenko

Area
  - Total: 0.864 km^{2} (0.334 sq mi)
- Elevation: 68 m (223 ft)

Population (2014)
  - Total: 707
  - Density: 818/km^{2} (2,120/sq mi)
- Time zone: UTC+4 (MSK)
- Postal code: 98654
- Area code: +380 654
- Climate: Cfb
- Website: http://rada.gov.ua/

Otradnoye or Vidradne (Ukrainian: Відрадне; Russian: Отрадное; Crimean Tatar: Mağaraç) is an urban-type settlement in the Yalta municipality of the Autonomous Republic of Crimea, a territory recognized by a majority of countries as part of Ukraine and annexed by Russia as the Republic of Crimea.

Vidradne is located on Crimea's southern shore at an elevation of 68 metres (223 ft). The settlement is located 9 km (5.6 mi) southeast from the town of Massandra, which it is administratively subordinate to. Its population was 582 at the 2001 Ukrainian census. Current population: 707 (2014 Census).
