= Voskhod, Yalta Municipality =

Voskhod Восход
- Urban-type settlement
- Location of Voskhod in Crimea
- Coordinates: 44°30′53″N 34°11′05″E
- Republic: Crimea
- Municipality: Yalta Municipality
- Founded: 1920
- Town status: 1971

Area
  - Total: 1.005 km^{2} (0.388 sq mi)
- Elevation: 229 m (751 ft)

Population (2014)
  - Total: 466
  - Density: 464/km^{2} (1,200/sq mi)
- Time zone: UTC+4 (MSK)
- Postal code: 98652
- Area code: +380 654

Voskhod (Ukrainian: Восход; Russian: Восход; Crimean Tatar: Cemiyet) is an urban-type settlement in the Yalta Municipality of the Autonomous Republic of Crimea, a territory recognized by a majority of countries as part of Ukraine and annexed by Russia as the Republic of Crimea.

Voskhod is located on Crimea's southern shore at an elevation of 229 metres (751 ft). It is administratively subordinate to the Massandra Settlement Council. Its population was 384 in the 2001 Ukrainian census. Current population: 466 (2014 Census).
