= Sanatorne =

Sanatorne Санаторне
- Urban-type settlement
- Location of Sanatorne in Crimea
- Coordinates: 44°23′54″N 33°48′47″E
- Republic: Crimea
- Municipality: Yalta Municipality
- Town status: 1971
- Elevation: 79 m (259 ft)

Population (2014)
  - Total: 232
- Time zone: UTC+3 (MSK)
- Postal code: 98692
- Area code: +380 654
- Climate: Cfb
- Website: http://rada.gov.ua/

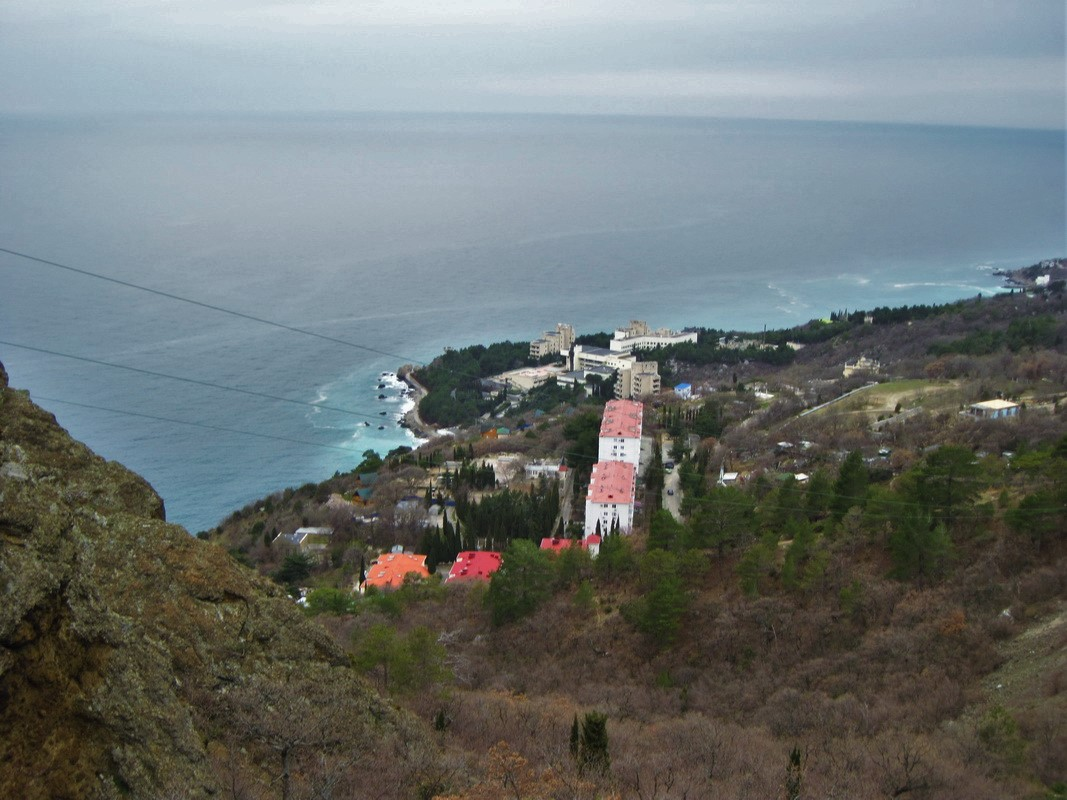

Sanatorne (Ukrainian: Санаторне; Russian: Санаторное; Crimean Tatar: Melas, from Greek Μέλας) is an urban-type settlement in the Yalta Municipality of the Autonomous Republic of Crimea, a territory recognized by a majority of countries as part of Ukraine and annexed by Russia as the Republic of Crimea.

Sanatorne is located on Crimea's southern shore at an elevation of 79 metres (259 ft). The settlement is located 3 km (1.9 mi) east from Foros, which it is administratively subordinate to. Its population was 531 in the 2001 Ukrainian census. Current population: 232 (2014 Census).
