= Feodosia Municipality =

Coordinates: 45°02′56″N 35°22′45″E

Feodosia City Municipality Феодосійська міськрада
- Municipality
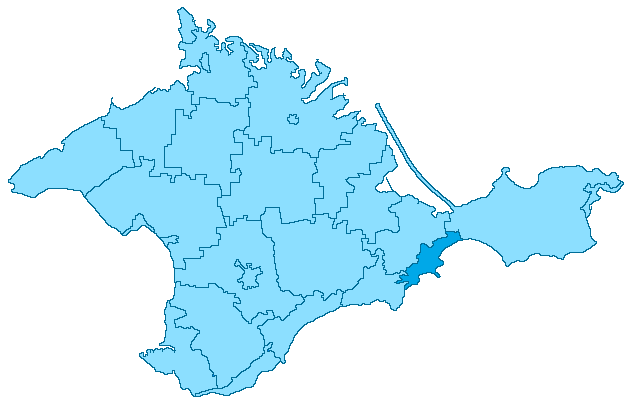
- Location within Crimea
- Country: Ukraine (occupied by Russia)
- Republic: Crimea
- Capital: Feodosia
- Subdivisions: List: 1 cities; 5 towns; 11 villages

Area
  - Total: 350 km^{2} (140 sq mi)

Population (2014)
  - Total: 100,962
  - Density: 290/km^{2} (750/sq mi)
- Time zone: UTC+3 (MSK)
- Dialing code: +380-6562 ^{1}
- (1) except for the towns of Krasnokamenka, Kurortne and Shchebetovka – calling code +380-6566

Feodosia City Municipality (Ukrainian: Феодосійська міськрада, romanized: Feodosiiska miskrada; Russian: Феодосийский горсовет, romanized: Feodosiysky gorsovet; Crimean Tatar: Kefe şeer şurası), officially "the territory governed by the Feodosia city council", is one of the 25 regions of the Autonomous Republic of Crimea, a territory recognized by a majority of countries as part of Ukraine and incorporated by Russia as the Republic of Crimea. Population: 100,962 (2014 Census).

It is a resort region, located in southeastern Crimea—one of the most popular recreational territories of the former Soviet Union. Besides its capital Feodosia, the region is famous for the resort town of Koktebel.

== Administrative and municipal status ==
Within the framework of administrative divisions of Russia, Feodosia is, together with a number of urban and rural localities, incorporated separately as the town of republican significance of Feodosia—an administrative unit with the status equal to that of the districts. As a municipal division, the town of republican significance of Feodosia is incorporated as Feodosia Urban Okrug.

Within the framework of administrative divisions of Ukraine, Feodosia is incorporated as the town of republican significance of Feodosia. Ukraine does not have municipal divisions.

Besides the city of Feodosia, the municipality includes five towns and 12 villages which are organised into seven town and village communities.

Former names which were officially changed in 1945–49 after the deportation of Crimean Tatars and are now used only by the Crimean Tatar community are mentioned in brackets.

- Beregovoye Village Community
  - Beregovoye (Qoran Eli)
  - Stepnoye
- Koktebel Town Community
  - Koktebel
  - Nanikove (Baraq Göl)
- Nasypnoye Villagу Community
  - Nasypnoye (Nasipköy)
  - Blyzhnye (Bay Buğa)
  - Vynogradnoye (Kürey Başı)
  - Pionerskoye (Gertsenberg)
  - Podgornoye
  - Solnechnoye (Paşa Töpe)
  - Yuzhnoye (Sultan Sala)
- Ordzhonikidze Town Community
  - Ordzhonikidze (Kaygador)
- Prymorskyi Town Community
  - Prymorskyi (Hafuz)
- Shchebetovka Town Community
  - Shchebetovka (Otuz)
  - Krasnokamyanka (Qızıltaş)
  - Kurortnoye (Aşağı Otuz)

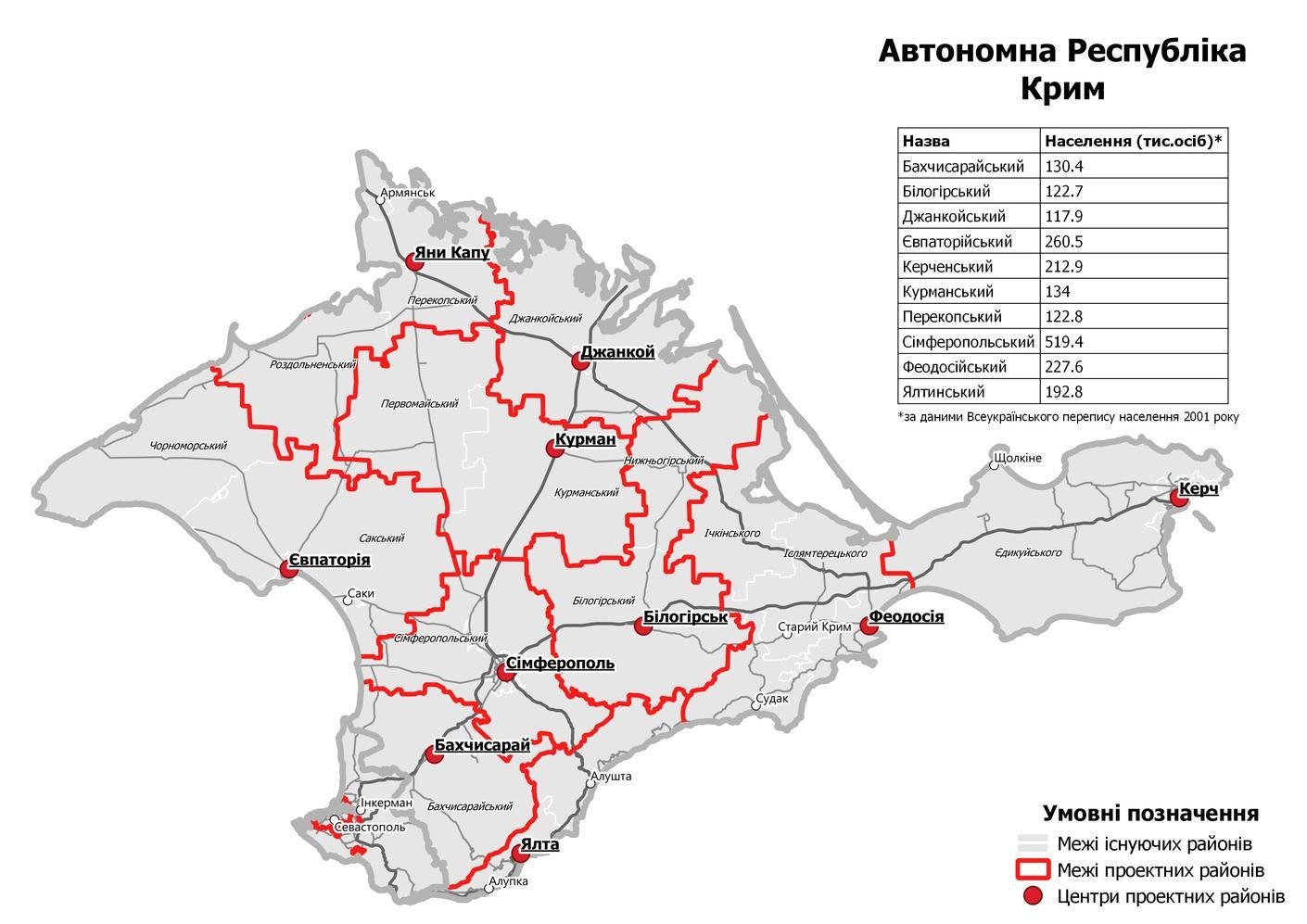
In July 2020, the Verkhovna Rada approved an administrative reform in Crimea

== 2020 Ukraine administrative reform ==
In July 2020, Ukraine conducted an administrative reform throughout its de jure territory. This included Crimea, which was at the time occupied by Russia, and is still ongoing as of October 2023. Crimea was reorganized from 14 raions and 11 municipalities into 10 raions, with municipalities abolished altogether.

Feodosia Municipality was abolished, and its territories to become a part of Feodosia Raion, but this has not yet been implemented due to the ongoing Russian occupation.
