= Dzhankoi Raion =

Coordinates: 45°42′31″N 34°23′36″E

Dzhankoi District Canköy rayonı
- Raion
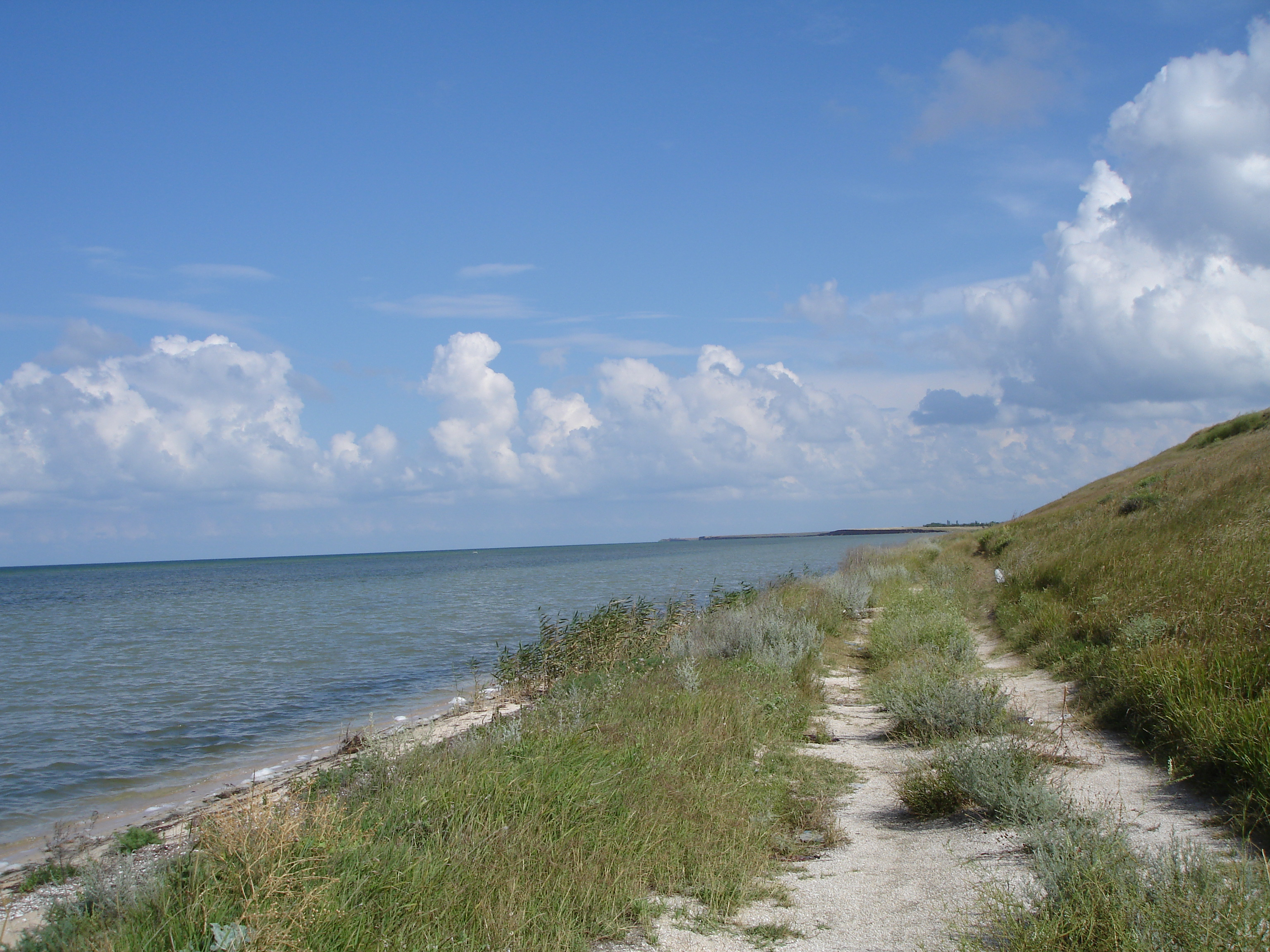
- Kalinovsky Nature Park, Dzhankoi District

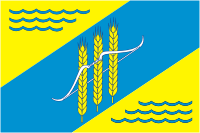
- Flag Seal
- Dzhankoi Raion location within Crimea
- Country: Ukraine (occupied by Russia)
- Region: Crimea^{a}
- Capital: Dzhankoi
- Subdivisions: List: 0 cities; 2 towns; 111 villages

Area
  - Total: 2,667 km^{2} (1,030 sq mi)

Population (2014)
  - Total: 68,429
  - Density: 25.66/km^{2} (66.45/sq mi)
- Time zone: UTC+3 (MSK)
- Dialing code: +380-6564
- Website: dzhankoy-rayon.rk.gov.ru

Dzhankoi Raion (Ukrainian: Джанкойський район, Russian: Джанкойский район, Crimean Tatar: Canköy rayonı) is one of the 25 regions of Crimea, currently subject to a territorial dispute between the Russian Federation and Ukraine. Population: 68,429 (2014 Census).

It is located in the northern part of the Crimean steppe near the Syvash Bay. The city of Dzhankoi is the raion's administrative centre, but it is excluded from the region and forms a separate municipality. The North-Crimean canal (the main waterway of northern Crimea supplying the republic with water from the Dnieper river) runs through the district.

== History ==
On 16 August 2022, during the Russian invasion of Ukraine, a large temporary ammunition store of the Russian forces in the villages of Maiske and Azovske was attacked, causing secondary explosions and fires that burned into the next day. Russian government officials plan to offer amounts of "10, 50 and 100 thousand rubles" to local villagers whose houses were damaged, depending on the magnitude of damage to each structure. The district frequently becomes the scene of pro-Ukrainian partisan warfare.

== 2020 Ukrainian Administrative Reform ==
In July 2020, Ukraine conducted an administrative reform throughout its de jure territory. This included Crimea, which was at the time occupied by Russia, and is still ongoing as of October 2023. Crimea was reorganized from 14 raions and 11 municipalities into 10 raions, with municipalities abolished altogether. The territory of Dzhankoi Raion was expanded to also include the territories of the Municipality of Dzhankoi, but has not yet been implemented due to the ongoing Russian occupation.

== Demographics ==
Ethnic makeup of the district according to the 2001 Ukrainian census:

2001 Ukrainian census
	percent
Russians	38.9%
Ukrainians	33.8%
Crimean Tatars	21.6%
Belarusians	1.7%
Poles	0.6%
Uzbeks	0.3%
Czechs	0.3%
Chuvashs	0.3%
Tatars	0.2%
Koreans	0.2%
Armenians	0.2%
Azerbaijanis	0.2%
