= Bakhchysarai Raion =

Bakhchysarai Raion Bağçasaray rayonı Багъчасарай районы
- Raion
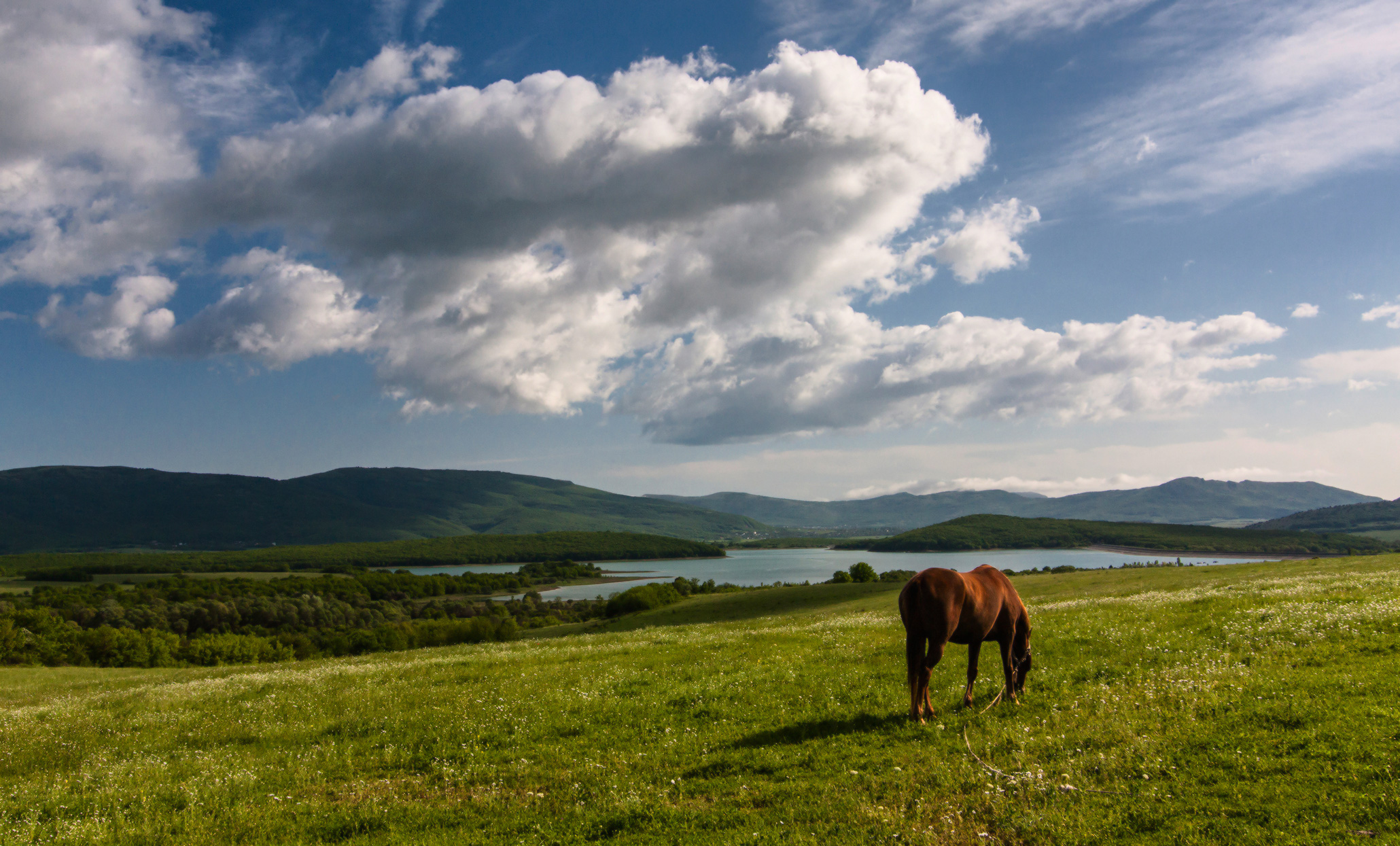
- Baydarsky Reserve, Bakhchysarai District

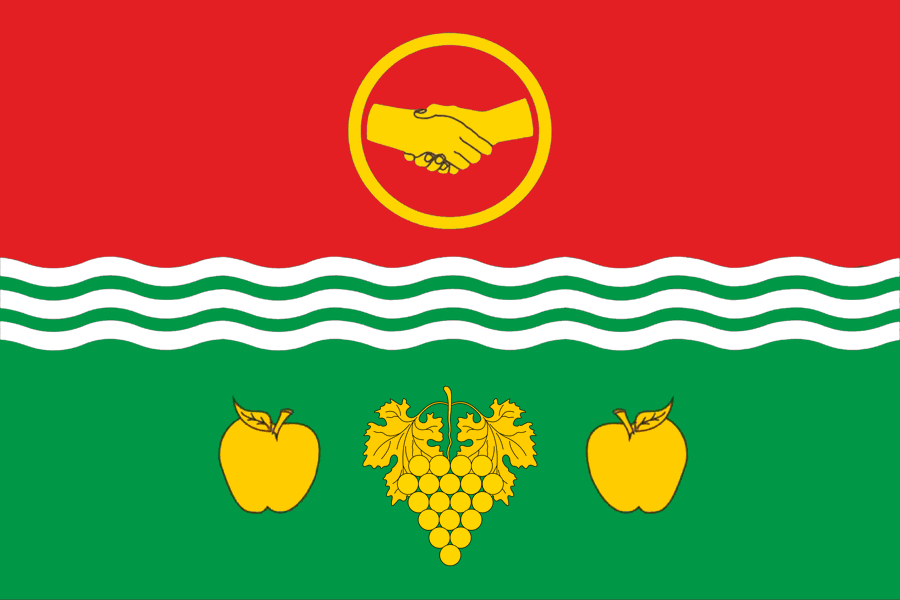
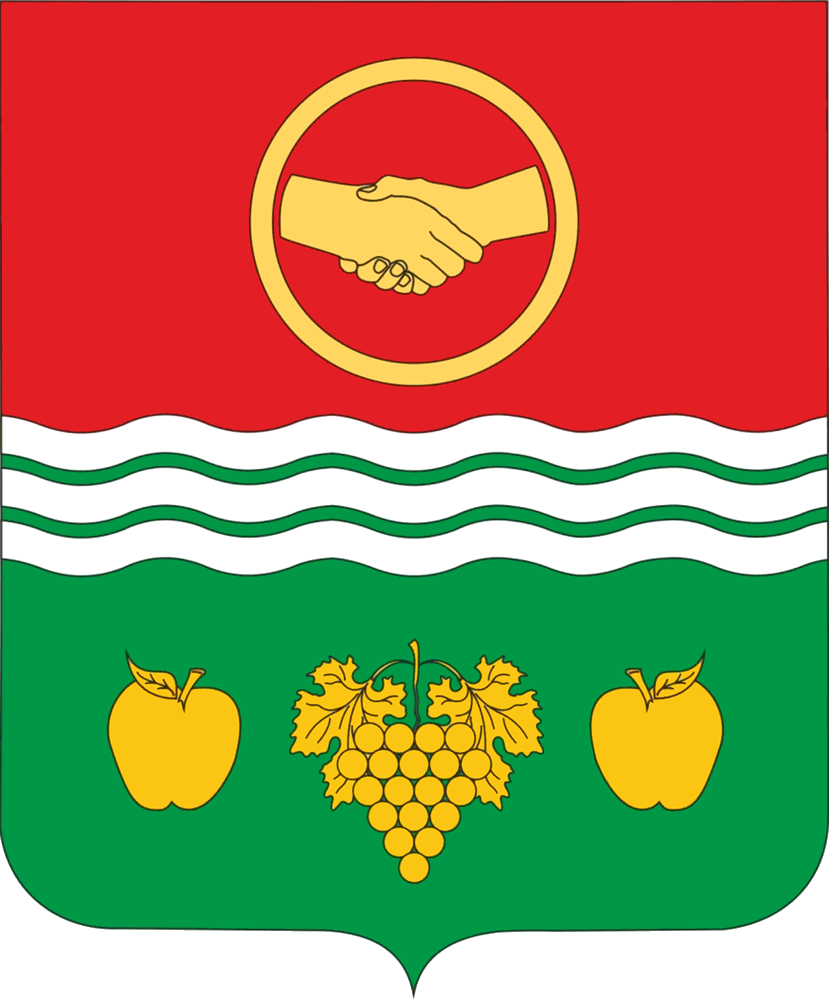
- Flag Seal
- Raion location within Crimea
- Coordinates: 44°45′N 33°54′E
- Country: Ukraine (occupied by Russia)
- Republic: Crimea
- Admin. center: Bakhchysarai
- Subdivisions: List: 2 cities; 7 rural settlements; 107 villages

Area
  - Total: 1,589 km^{2} (614 sq mi)

Population (2014)
  - Total: 90,911
  - Density: 57.21/km^{2} (148.2/sq mi)
- Time zone: UTC+2 (EET)
  - Summer (DST): UTC+3 (EEST)
- Dialing code: +380-6554

Bakhchysarai Raion (Russian: Бахчисарайский район; Ukrainian: Бахчисарайський район; Crimean Tatar: Bağçasaray rayonı) is one of the 25 regions of Crimea, an internationally recognized territory of Ukraine occupied and annexed by Russia in 2014. Population: 90,911 (2014 Census).

The Bakhchysarai Raion is situated in the southwestern part of the peninsula. Two thirds of the raion's area is mountainous, while the northwestern part of the region is occupied by the coastal plain.

== Places of interest ==
The raion contains a great number of historical landmarks of the ancient history and the Middle Ages history of Crimea, among which are so called cave cities Chufut-Kale, Mangup, and others. The administrative centre of the raion, Bakhchysarai, in the past was a capital of the Crimean Khanate. In addition, the Crimean Astrophysical Observatory is located in the town of Nauchnyi.

A few other important attractions located within the raion:

- Bakhchysarai Palace
- The "cave city" of Çufut Qale
- The "cave city" of Eski Kermen
- Mangup
- The "cave city" of Tepe-Kermen
- Uspenskyi Cave Monastery

== 2020 Ukrainian Administrative Reform ==
In July 2020, Ukraine conducted an administrative reform throughout its de jure territory. This included Crimea, which was at the time occupied by Russia, and is still ongoing as of July 2026. Crimea was reorganized from 14 raions and 11 municipalities into 10 raions, with municipalities abolished altogether. The territory of Bakhchysarai Raion was expanded to include parts of Sevastopol, which has been de jure implemented since 2023.
