= Simferopol Raion =

Raion in Crimea

Coordinates: 44.9519°N 34.1022°E

Simferopol Raion Симферопольский район Сімферопольський район
- Raion
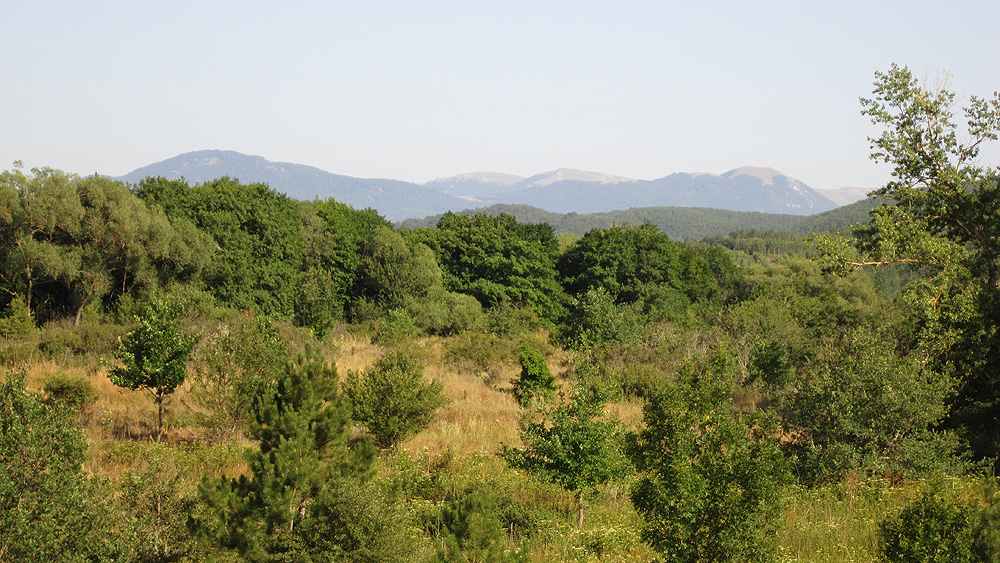
- Landscape in Simferpol District

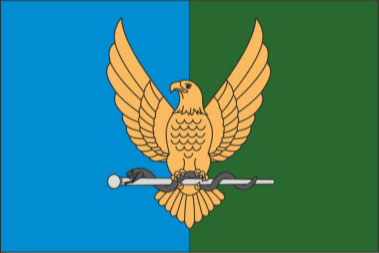
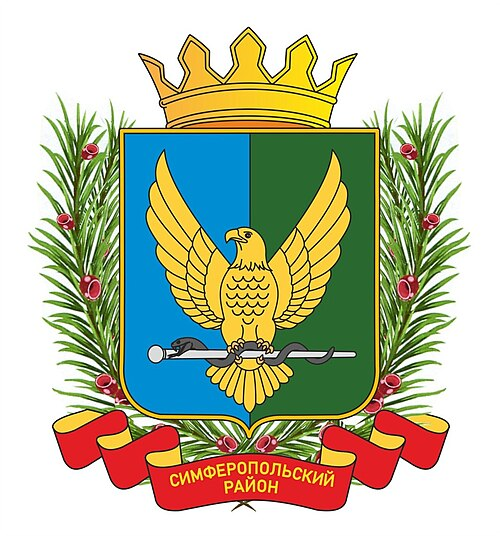
- Flag Seal
- Raion location within Crimea
- Country: Disputed: Ukraine (de jure); Russia (de facto)
- Republic: Crimea
- Capital: Simferopol
- Subdivisions: List: 0 Cities; 12 Towns; 92 Villages

Area
  - Total: 1,753 km^{2} (677 sq mi)

Population (2014)
  - Total: 152,091
  - Density: 86.76/km^{2} (224.7/sq mi)
- Time zone: UTC+3 (MSK)
- Dialing code: +383-652
- Website: simfmo.rk.gov.ru

Simferopol Raion (Ukrainian: Сімферопольський район, Russian: Симферопольский район, Crimean Tatar: Aqmescit rayonı) is one of the 25 regions of the Crimean peninsula, administered by Russia, but considered by many countries as part of Ukraine. The administrative center of the raion is the city of Simferopol which is incorporated as a town of republican significance and is not a part of the district. The Simferopol Raion is situated in the central part of the peninsula. Population: 152,091 (2014 Census).

== Demographics ==
According to the 2001 All-Ukrainian Census, the population of the region was 149,253 persons. The population showed the following ethnic groups:

- Russians – 49.4%
- Ukrainians – 23.5%
- Crimean Tatars – 22.2%
- Belarusians — 1.4%
- Poles – 0.2%
- Moldovans — 0.2%

Population as of May 1, 2012 was 157,589.

== 2020 Ukrainian Administrative Reform ==
In July 2020, Ukraine conducted an administrative reform throughout its de jure territory. This included Crimea, which was at the time occupied by Russia, and is still ongoing as of October 2023. Crimea was reorganized from 14 raions and 11 municipalities into 10 raions, with municipalities abolished altogether. The territory of Simferopol Raion was expanded to also include the territories of the Simferopol Municipality, but has not yet been implemented due to the ongoing Russian occupation.
