= Simeiz =

Simeiz Сімеїз

- Flag Coat of arms

- Location of Simeiz in Crimea Simeiz (Ukraine)
- Coordinates: 44°24′21″N 33°59′24″E
- Republic: Crimea
- Municipality: Yalta Municipality
- Local council: Simeiz

Government
  - Mayor: Mykola Makarenko
- Elevation: 100 m (330 ft)

Population (2014)
  - Total: 2,604
- Time zone: UTC+4 (MSK)
- Postal code: 98680 — 98682
- Area code: +380-654
- Climate: Cfa

Simeiz (Ukrainian: Сімеїз; Russian: Симеиз; Crimean Tatar: Simeiz) is a resort town, an urban-type settlement in Yalta Municipality in the Autonomous Republic of Crimea, a territory recognized by a majority of countries as part of Ukraine and incorporated by Russia as the Republic of Crimea. Its name is of Greek origin (σημαία 'flag' + -εις, a plural suffix). The town is located by the southern slopes of the main range of Crimean Mountains at the base of Mount Kosh-Kaya, 18 kilometers (11 mi) west from Yalta. Population: 2,604 (2014 Census).

== History ==
=== Early history ===
There are prehistoric dolmens and fortifications nearby; in the Middle Ages the area was under the control of the Byzantine Empire, which built a fortified monastery in the vicinity (and may have given the town its name). As the Byzantine power weakened, the area fell under the control of Genoa, which in its turn gave way to the Ottoman Empire; under the Ottomans the village was ruled from Mangup. By 1778, with the departure of the Christian population, the village was almost entirely depopulated.

=== 19th and 20th century ===
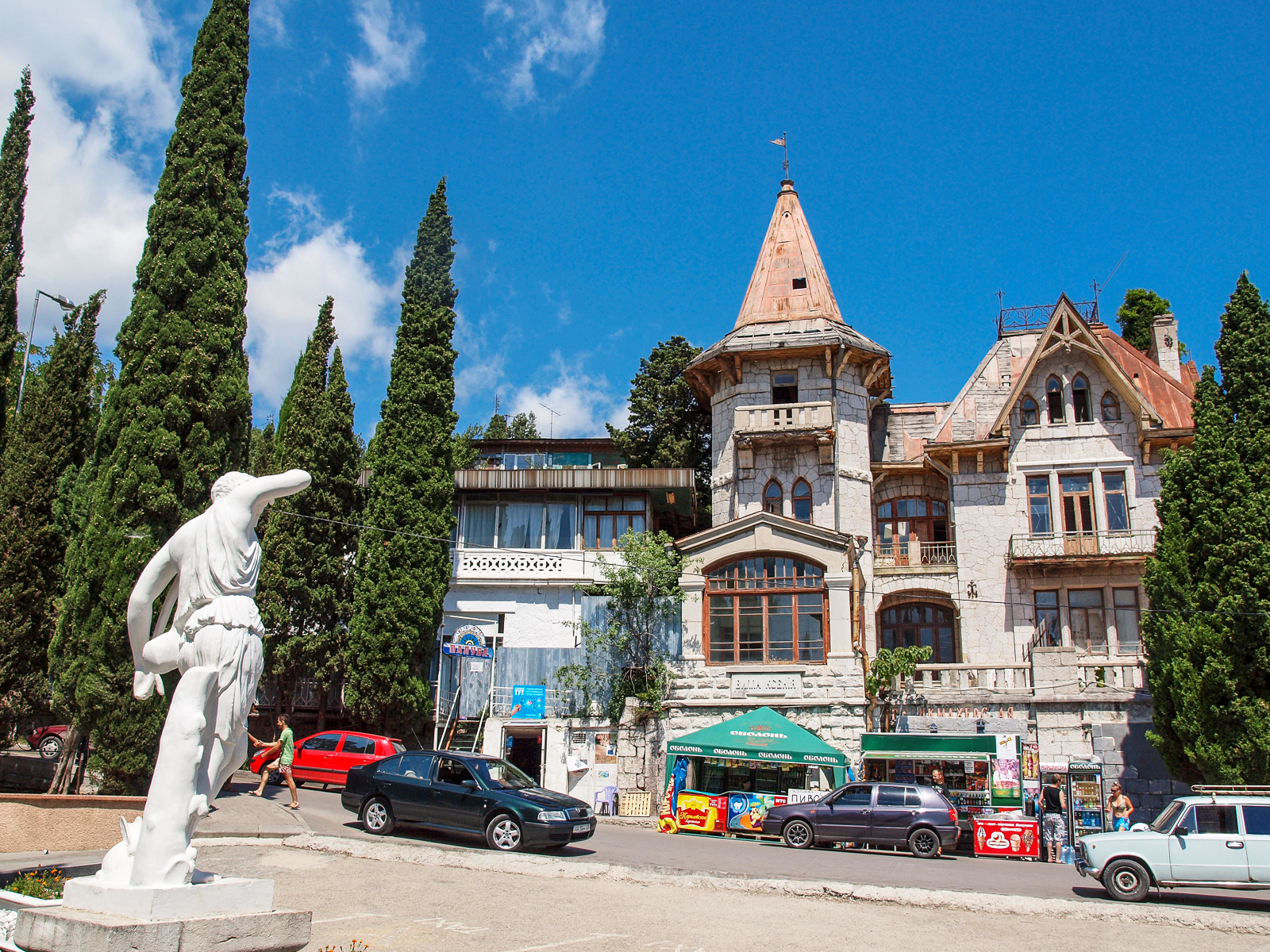
Villa Kseniya in Simeiz

In 1828 Simeiz came into the ownership of Ivan Akimovich Maltsov, who started vineyards in the area. In 1900, Maltsov, who was an amateur astronomer, founded the Simeiz Observatory. It would later be developed and expanded over the following decades.

In the early 20th century, Maltsov's descendants created a resort, Novy Simoiz. Novy Simoiz quickly became one of the most prestigious resorts in the Crimea. This period saw the construction of a park and a number of villas which remain to this day. In 1912 Nicholas II visited with his family. After the October Revolution, Simeiz was nationalized and public sanatoriums were created, mainly specializing in tuberculosis. In 1927 Simeiz was visited by around 10,000 people.

During World War II, the Germans occupied Simeiz beginning on November 8, 1941, causing much death and destruction; the town was liberated by the Red Army on April 16, 1944. During the occupation, the Simeiz Observatory was heavily damaged. On May 18, 1944, Soviet dictator Joseph Stalin ordered the beginning of the deportation of the Crimean Tatars across the entire peninsula, including Simeiz. As a result, the Crimean Tatars, an indigenous people of Crimea, were exiled to Central Asia under the grounds of allegedly collaborating with Nazi Germany.

After the war, the resort experienced a rebirth, and the ruins were gone by 1955. The Simeiz Observatory was rebuilt, and continued to be important in the field of astronomy.

=== 21st century ===
Before the 2014 annexation of Crimea by the Russian Federation, Simeiz was known in the post-Soviet space as a "gay resort". Homosexual couples from countries of the former USSR would commonly go to Simeiz for summer vacations. Couples walked hand in hand, starting from the bus station. No one threw stones, no one created any obstacles, except for everyday hooliganism, which is everywhere. According to Denis Kratt, a local art director, the gay community was very visible in the town, saying that gay couples could hold hands in public without fear of harassment or violence. However, after Russia's takeover of the peninsula in 2014, the new occupation government enforced homophobic policies in Crimea, largely destroying the vibrant gay scene. LGBT community leaders were forced to flee or go underground. Local art director said that for active LGBT representatives in Crimea, "it is impossible to live there". In 2018, journalists described a bar in Simeiz as "the last gay bar on the peninsula".

== Demographics ==
As of 1926, Simeiz had a population of 622 people. 431 of these were Crimean Tatars, 119 Russians, 31 Greeks, and 25 Ukrainians. By 2014, the population of Simeiz had risen to 3,501.

== Gallery ==
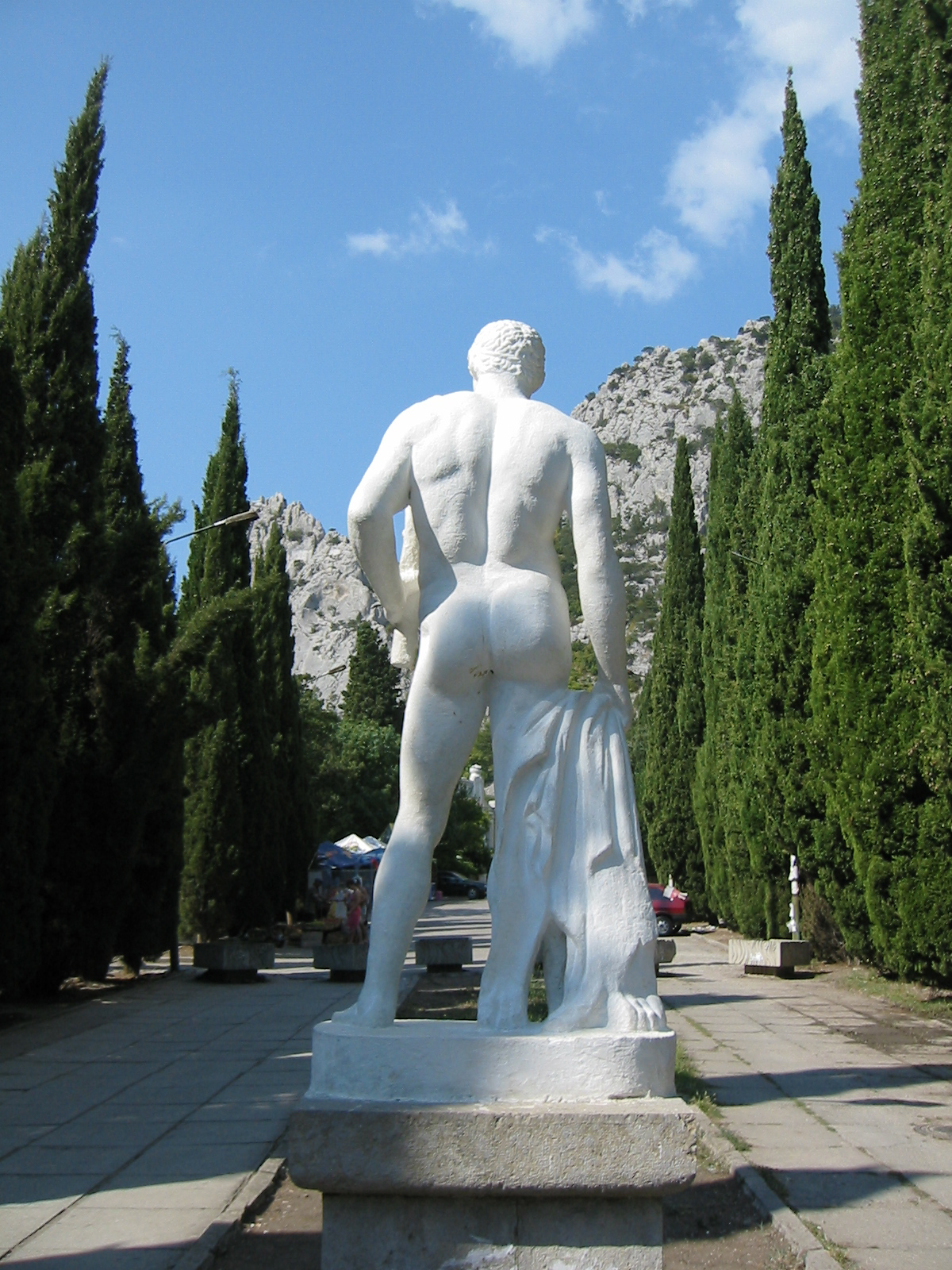
Simeiz Park

Rock Diva

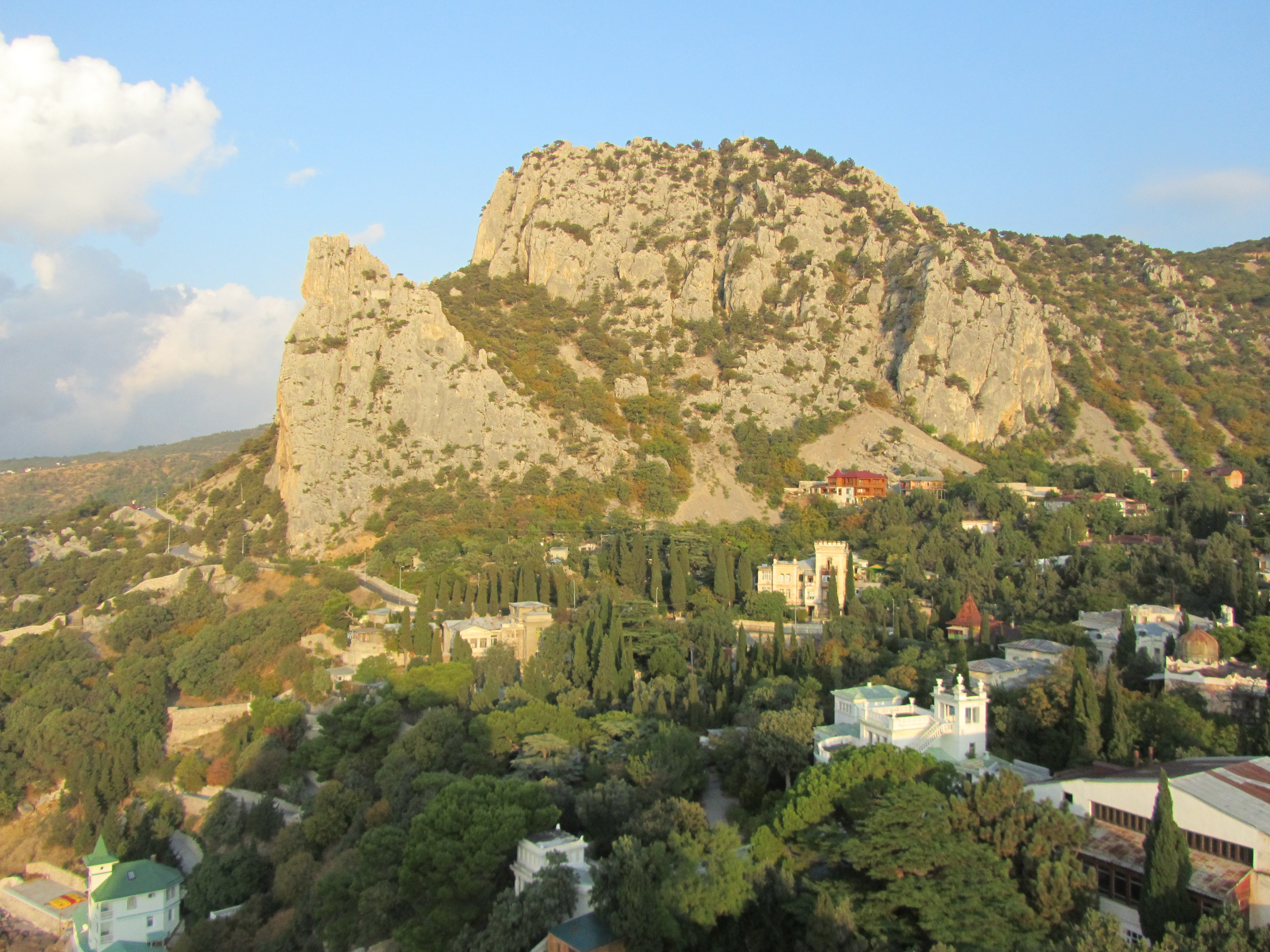
Mount Koshka

== Climate ==
Climate data for Simeiz
Month	Jan	Feb	Mar	Apr	May	Jun	Jul	Aug	Sep	Oct	Nov	Dec	Year
Mean daily maximum °C (°F)	8 (46)	7 (45)	12 (54)	15 (59)	21 (70)	26 (79)	30 (86)	30 (86)	25 (77)	22 (72)	16 (61)	10 (50)	15 (59)
Daily mean °C (°F)	4 (39)	4 (39)	6 (43)	11 (52)	15 (59)	20 (68)	23 (73)	22 (72)	18 (64)	13 (55)	9 (48)	6 (43)	12 (54)
Mean daily minimum °C (°F)	2 (36)	1 (34)	3 (37)	8 (46)	12 (54)	17 (63)	20 (68)	19 (66)	15 (59)	11 (52)	6 (43)	3 (37)	10 (50)
Average precipitation days	16	13	12	11	10	8	6	6	7	8	11	16	124
Source: Simeiz.net
