= 2014 Crimean Federal District census =

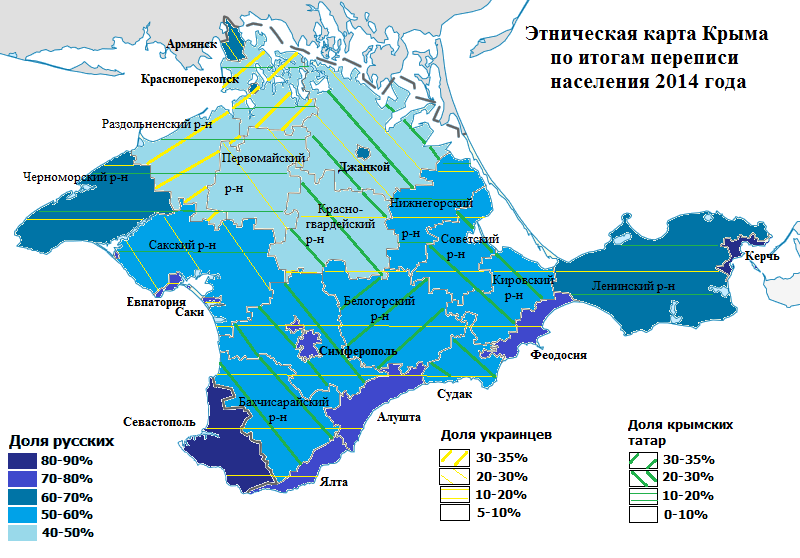
Ethnic composition of the Crimean Federal District, according to the 2014 census.

The Crimean Federal District census (Russian: Перепись населения в Крымском федеральном округе), transliterated as Perepis naseleniya v Krymskom federalnom okruge, was carried out in Crimea by Russia in 2014, following its annexation by Russia. The census found the total population to be 2,284,769 inhabitants.
