= Renaming of Crimean toponyms =

Part of the de-Tatarization of Crimea

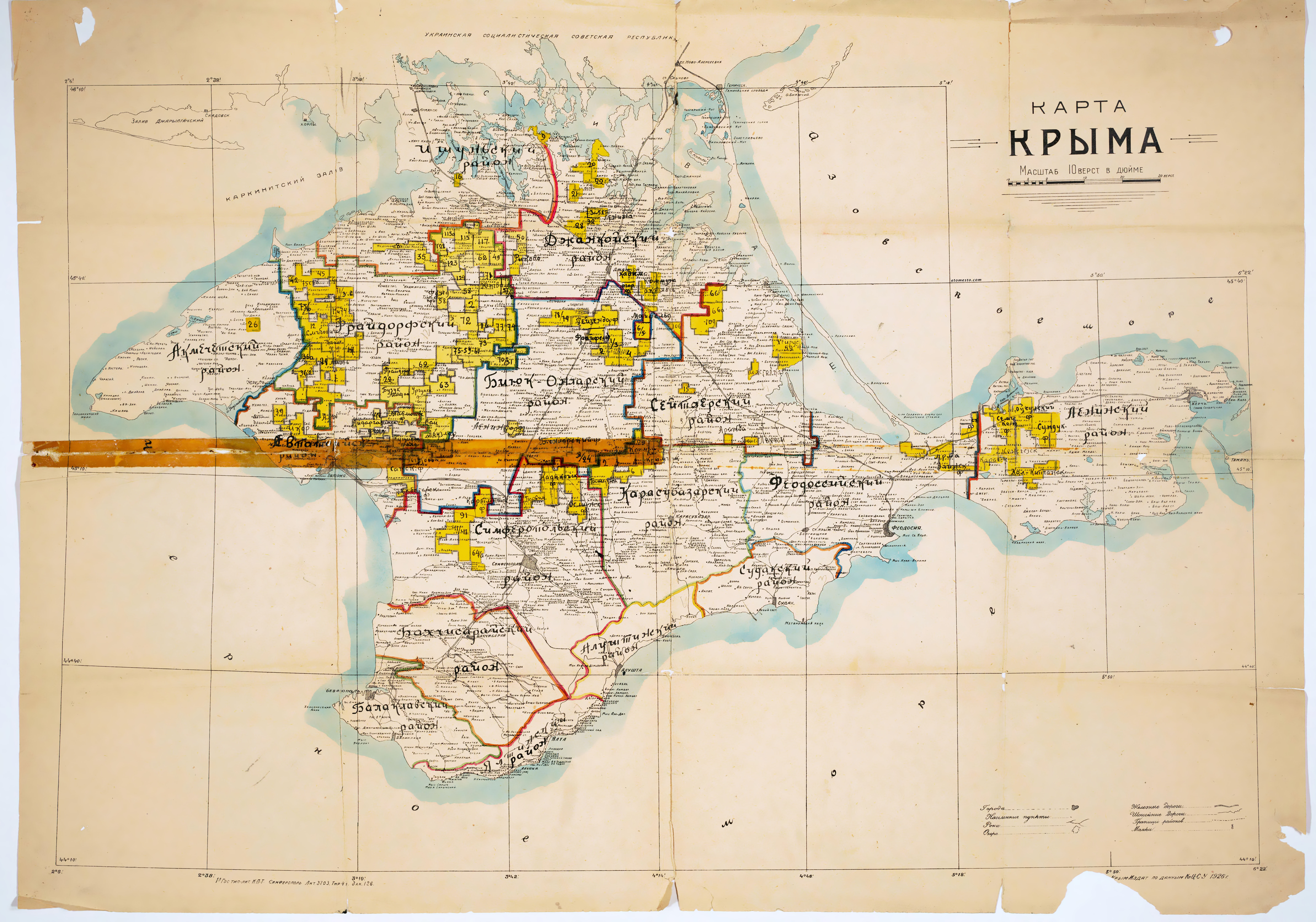
Crimean ASSR in 1926

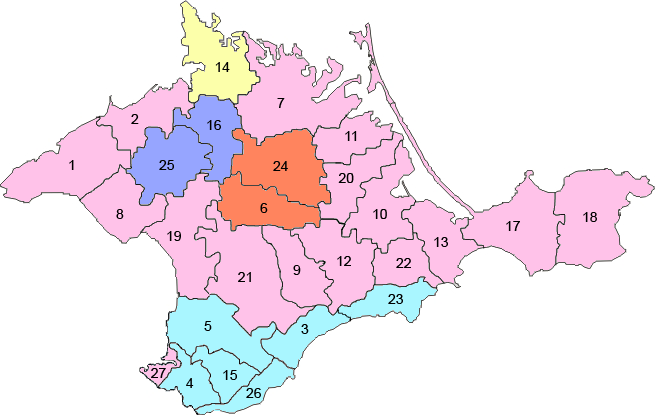
Administrative division of the Crimean ASSR with ethnical status of raions marked with colors (light blue for Crimean Tatar, rose for Russian, blue for Jewish, red for German, yellow for Ukrainian): 1 Ak-Mechet Raion, 2 Ak-Sheykh Raion, 3 Alushta Raion, 4 Balaklava Raion, 5 Bakhchisaray Raion, 6 Büyük Onlar Raion, 7 Dzhankoy Raion, 8 Yevpatoriya Raion, 9 Zuya Raion, 10 Ichki Raion, 11 Kalay Raion, 12 Karasubazar Raion, 13 Kirovskoye Raion (center in İslâm Terek), 14 Krasnoperekopsk Raion, 15 Kuibyshevo Raion (center in Albat), 16 Larindorf Raion (center in Curçı (Dzhurchi)), 17 Lenino Raion, 18 Mayak Salyn Raion, 19 Saky Raion, 20 Seyitler Raion, 21 Simferopol Raion, 22 Staryi Krym Raion, 23 Sudak Raion, 24 Telman Raion (center in Qurman (Kurman)), 25 Fraydorf Raion, 26 Yalta Raion, 27 Sevastopol.

Massive renaming of Crimean toponyms by the Soviet government took place during the conversion of the Crimean ASSR into the Crimean Oblast, in four waves (in 1944, 1945, 1948, and 1949). Renaming occurred after the deportation in 1944 of Crimean Tatars and other non-Slavic peoples living in Crimea. The old names were mostly of Crimean Tatar origin, while the new ones were Russian. As a result of the renaming, over 1300 settlements in Crimea received new names (over 90% of the peninsula's settlements). A large part of the villages disappeared in the following decades. After 1990, three settlements returned to their historical names (Koktebel, Partenit, and Sarybash). The renaming is one aspect of de-Tatarization of Crimea.

In 1944, raions (districts) and raion centers of Crimea were renamed; in 1945, village councils and their centers; and in 1948 and 1949, the majority of settlements. This list includes only settlements (i.e., it does not list the renamed districts and village councils). Settlements are divided by districts of the Crimean ASSR with their names before the renaming in the 1940s.

== Ak-Mechet Raion ==
1. Aqmeçit (Ak-Mechet) → Chernomorskoye
2. Ablaq Acı → Kalinovka
3. Abulğazı → Svobodnoye
4. Abuzlar → Vysokoye
5. Aldermeskaya Skala → Storozhevaya
6. Aq Baş → Vyacheslavovka
7. Aqqoca → Dozornoye
8. Aşağı Qulçuq → Traktornoye
9. Ateş → Kostrovka
10. Bay Qıyat → Vladimirovka
11. Bayım → Tikhoye
12. Bel Avuz → Peresyp
13. Bel Avuz Qıpçaq → Gromovoye
14. Burun Eli → Rybnoye
15. Büyük Köstel → Bolshoy Yar
16. Büyük Qalaç → Kalachi
17. Buzav → Dedovo
18. Cağa Qulçuq → Lazurnoye
19. Camal → Nizovka
20. Can Baba → Maryino
21. Caylav → Pastbishchnoye
22. Çegelek → Kuznetskoye
23. Çeger Acı → Znamenskoye
24. Çoñğurçı → Zadornoye
25. Çoqraq → Istochniki
26. Davul Car → Groznoye
27. Deñiz Bayçı → Denisovka
28. Doñuzlav 1 → Krasnoyarskoye
29. Doñuzlav 2 → Kamyshino
30. Dört Saqal → Lenskoye
31. Kel Şeyh → Smushkovo
32. Keleçi → Karelskoye
33. Kerlevüt → Vodopiynoye
34. Küçük Köstel → Maly Yar
35. Laş Qıpçaq → Rybatskoye
36. Musa Ali → Zaytsevo
37. Nemse Çağaltay → Severnoye
38. Nemse Tana Bay → Naydenovo
39. Oçeretay → Priboynoye
40. Otar → Yasnoye
41. Otuz → Staroselye
42. Oy Eli → Milovoye
43. Oyrat → Morskoye
44. Qara Acı → Olenevka
45. Qaraba Qudaş → Yastrebovoye
46. Qarlav → Snezhnoye
47. Qarmış → Glubokoye
48. Qır Çeger Acı → Karakulovka
49. Qır Qulaç → Uspeshnoye
50. Qır Qulçuq → Chistopolye
51. Qışlav → Zimovka
52. Qızıl Çoñrav → Krasnaya Polyana
53. Qoñrat → Bagrationovo
54. Qul Caqın → Okhotniki
55. Qul Sadıq → Kulikovo
56. Qula Şeyh → Skalistoye
57. Qunan → Krasnoselskoye
58. Qurama Köstel → Malyshevka
59. Qurman Acı → Romashkino
60. Sabançı → Kirillovka
61. Saçal → Sychevo
62. Sadır Bağay → Khmelevoye
63. Şamaq → Baranovka
64. Saqav → Morozovoye
65. Tabuldı As → Medvedevoye
66. Tarpançı → Okunovka
67. Tatar Çağaltay → Dalneye
68. Tatar Çoñğurçı → Yaroslavka
69. Tatar Qarlav → Chaykino
70. Temeş As → Solenoye
71. Temeş Qaraba → Makarovka
72. Terekli Ass → Ozerovka
73. Toq Col → Kolodeznoye
74. Toqa → Artemovka
75. Tuvaqa → Rovno
76. Üç Quyu Qıpçaq → Mayorovo
77. Ulan Eli → Glebovka
78. Yañı Çegelek → Novokuznetskoye
79. Yarılğaç → Mezhvodnoye
80. Yaşpek → Vnukovo
81. settlement of fishery industry Ak-Saray → Peschanka

== Ak-Sheykh Raion ==
1. Aqşeyh (Ak-Sheykh) → Rozdolnoye
2. Aqsaqal Merkit → Bakhchevka
3. Atay Temir → Maksimovka
4. Ayğul → Mirazhnoye
5. Ayıp → Stepovoye
6. Baqqal → Slavnoye
7. Bay Oğlu Qıpçaq → Ogni
8. Bay Qondı → Bykovo
9. Bek Qotan → Prisivashevo
10. Bek Qotan Qoñrat → Mikulinovo
11. Beş Pilâv → Varyagino
12. Biy Örlük → Orlovka
13. Bozuq Quyu → Senokosnoye
14. Büyten → Kotovskoye
15. Büyük As → Lastochkino
16. Caylav → Gorlitsa
17. Çerkez → Vetryanka
18. Eski Qızıl Bay → Kumovo
19. Freileben (Frayleben) → Tyulpany
20. İlgeri Qaspir, former Esen-Eli-Qas-Borü → Krasnoye Utro
21. Kereyit → Kommunarnoye
22. Küçük Abay → Romanovka
23. Küçük As → Kremnevo
24. Lenindorf → Divnoye
25. Manay → Kovylnoye
26. Nemse Köp Qarı → Ruchyi
27. Nemse Oğuz Oğlu → Babushkino
28. Nemse Sarı Bolat → Novoye
29. Oğuz Oğlu → Chernishovo
30. Otar → Gusevka
31. Qara Ata Qıyat → Lapino
32. Qara Merkit → Kashtanovka
33. Qara Nayman → Krilovka
34. Qaraba Köküş → Kukushkino
35. Qaraça Örlük → Kozlovka
36. Qarçığa → Rileyevka
37. Qarmış → Dobrinka
38. Qazaq Baqqal → Gosudarevo
39. Qırğız Qazaq → Kozachye
40. Qudaş → Zaytsevo
41. Qul Canay → Geroyskoye
42. Qul Seyit → Tatyanovka
43. Rus Amanşa → Pogranichnoye
44. Rus Camanaq → Zolotoy Kolos
45. Rus Köp Qarı → Komyshnoye
46. Sadır → Slovyanskoye
47. Sarı Bolat → Portovo
48. Sarı Qıpçaq → Puchki
49. Sarı Qıpçaq and Yañı Qıpçaq → Smolnoye
50. Şeyh Eli → Lebedevo
51. Seymen → Semenovka
52. Sırt Camanaq → Makovka
53. Sırt Qaspir → Pisarevka
54. Smail Bay → Volochayevka
55. Smidovich → Berezovka
56. Stalindorf → Niva
57. Taş Quyu → Gorodnoye
58. Tatar Aqşeyh → Chervonoye
59. Tatar Manay → Malyutka
60. Tatış Qoñrat → Avrora
61. Tavkel Nayman → Bugry
62. Toq Şeyh → Kropotkino
63. Toqmaq → Prokhladnoye
64. Yañı Manay → Molochnoye
65. Yañı Qızıl Bay → Borisovka
66. Yuqarı Altıncı Merkit → Shestovo
67. Yuqarı Baqqal → Storozhevo

== Alushta Raion ==
1. Büyük Lambat → Maly Mayak
2. Demirci → Luchistoye
3. Körbekül → Izobilnoye
4. Küçük Lambat → Kiparisnoye
5. Küçük Özen → Malorechenskoye
6. Qarabağ → Bondarenkovo
7. Quru Özen → Solnechnogorskoye
8. Şuma, Yuqarı Şuma → Kutuzovka
9. Tırnaq → Professorsky Ugolok
10. Tuvaq → Rybachye
11. Ulu Özen → Generalskoye
12. Üsküt → Privetnoye

== Bakhchysarai Raion ==
1. Acı Bolat → Uglovoye
2. Acıköy → Pirogovka
3. Alma Kermen → Mironovka
4. Alma Kermen → Zavetnoye
5. Alma Tamaq → Peschanoye
6. Alma Tarhan → Krasnoarmeyskoye
7. Almaçıq → Yablochnoye
8. Aq Çoqraq → Bely Istochnik
9. Aqtaçı → Furmanovka
10. Aramkoy → Novenkoye
11. Arançı → Suvorovo
12. Atçeut → Kazanki
13. Avcıköy → Okhotnichye
14. Azek → Plodovoye
15. Aziz → Zadorozhnoye
16. Bakkal Su → Panfilovka
17. Balta Çoqraq → Alyoshino
18. Bazarçıq → Pochtovoye
19. Biy El → Dorozhnoye
20. Biya Sala → Verkhorechye
21. Bürlük → Vilinoye
22. Büyük Yaşlav → Repine
23. Cav Cürek → Rovnopolye
24. Çerkez Eli → Balki
25. Çotqara → Krasnaya Zvezda
26. Çotqara → Malodvornaya
27. Duvanköy → Verkhnesadovoye
28. Efendiköy → Komsomolskoye
29. Eski Eli → Vishnevoye
30. Eski Yurt → Podgornoye
31. Gölümbey → Nekrasovka
32. Hanışköy → Otradnoye
33. Kazbi-Eli → Solnechnoye
34. Kişine → Tabachnoye
35. Küçük Yaşlav → Viktorovka
36. Laki → Goryanka
37. Mahuldür → Nagornoye
38. Mamaşay → Orlovka
39. Orta Kesek → Sviderskoye
40. Öteş Eli → Kochergine
41. Oysuñki → Rostushcheye
42. Pıçqı → Bashtanovka
43. Qalımtay → Tenistoye
44. Qobazı → Malinovka
45. Qoçqar Eli → Bryanskoye
46. Qocuq Eli → Shevchenkovo
47. Qoş Degirmen → Peredushchelnoye
48. Quvuş → Shovkovichnoye
49. Rus Aranköy → Dlinnoye
50. Sabla → Partizanskoye
51. Salaçıq → Starosellya
52. Saqav → Zayachye
53. Şaqul → Samokhvalovo
54. Stilâ → Lesnikovo
55. Şüri → Kudrine
56. Süyür Taş → Belokamennoye
57. Tatar Osman → Zelenoye
58. Tatarköy → Mashinnoye
59. Tav Badraq → Skalistoye
60. Teberti → Turgenyevka
61. Töle → Dachnoye
62. Topçıköy → Dolinnoye
63. Ulaqlı → Gluboky Yar
64. Ürmek → Zagorskoye
65. Yañı Badraq → Trudolyubovka
66. unnamed hamlet near the Alma River → Ustye
67. settlement to the southwest of the village Priyatnoye Svidaniye → Topolye
68. settlement of the separate sovkhoz Polina Osipenko → Polyushko
69. settlement of the sovkhoz of etheric oil crops → Aromatnoye
70. settlement of the estate of the sovkhoz Polina Osipenko → Osipenko

== Balaklava Raion ==
1. Alsu → Morozovka
2. Aşağı Özenbaş → Nizhnyaya Khvorostyanka
3. Ay Todor → Goristoye
4. Bağa → Novobobrovskoye
5. Baydar → Orlinoye
6. Belbek → Fruktovoye
7. Büyük Muskomiya → Shirokoye
8. Çorğun → Chernorechenskoye
9. Kalendo → Podgornoye
10. Khayto → Tylovaya
11. Küçük Muskomiya → Rezervnoye
12. Qadıköy (Kadikoi) → Prigorodnoye
13. Qamara → Oboronnoye
14. Qamışlı, Eski Qamışlı → Dalneye
15. Qaran → Flotskoye
16. Sahtik → Pavlovka
17. Savatka → Rozsoshanka
18. Skele → Rodnikovskoye
19. Şülü → Ternovka
20. Uppa → Rodnoye
21. Urkusta → Peredovoye
22. Uzuncı → Kolkhoznoye
23. Varnautka → Goncharnoye
24. Yañı Şüli → Shturmovoye
25. Yuqarı Özenbaş → Verkhnyaya Khvorostyanka
26. settlement of the sovkhoz "Krasnyi Flag" → Ushakovo

== Büyük Onlar Raion ==
1. Büyük Onlar → Oktyabrskoye
2. Acı Eli Qıpçaq → Lermontovka
3. Acı Keç → Kharitonovka
4. Acı Mambet → Baglikove
5. Ala Tay → Zolotoye
6. Alabaş Qoñrat → Amurskoye
7. Aqula → Mendeleyevo
8. Aqyar Ciyren → Kotelnikovo
9. Aşağı Beş Aran → Pyatikhlebnoye
10. Ay Tuvğan → Pologi
11. Baqşay → Narodnoye
12. Bay Kögenli → Lomonosovo
13. Beş Üy İlâq → Stakhanovka
14. Beşüyli → Pyatikhatka
15. Bolatçı → Pryamoye
16. Borağan → Vavilovo
17. Borançı → Podsobnoye
18. Borançı Qıtay → Shirokoye
19. Büyten → Khlopkovoye
20. Cağa Çelebi → Razino
21. Cağa Mamış → Sukhovrechye
22. Cağa Şeyh Eli → Kholmovoye
23. Can Boldı Qoñrat → Razinoye
24. Cayçı → Podgornoye
25. Çeçe → Tsvetkovo
26. Çille → Maryevka
27. Çoñrav → Kolodeznoye
28. Cuma Ablam → Traktovoye
29. Eki Baş → Veligino
30. Eski İtaq → Lozhbinnoye
31. İlgeri Ablam → Simonenko
32. Kögen Cılğa → Khmelnitskoye
33. Komzet → Turgenyevo
34. Köstel → Kurgannoye
35. Miñler → Yelnya
36. Molla Eli → Dibrovskoye
37. Oçqa Baylar → Zvezdnoye
38. Özenbaş → Timoshenkovo
39. Qazançı → Divnoye
40. Qır Baylar → Leninskoye
41. Qır Baylar Vaqıf → Raduzhnoye
42. Qırımçaq → Orlovka
43. Qırmaçı → Lazo
44. Qıtay → Kalinine
45. Qıyabaq → Krilovka
46. Rus Büyük → Russkoye
47. Salğır Qıyat → Rechnoye
48. Şiban → Neglinka
49. Tabuldı → Naydyonovka
50. Taliy İlâq → Pushkaryovka
51. Tatar Ay Tuvğan → Zhukovskoye
52. Tavuq Camin → Belokamenka
53. Tilençi → Dokuchayevo
54. Tovmay → Zarechnoye
55. Uzqastı → Kuprinovo
56. Yañı İtaq → Komarovka
57. Yañı Otarçıq → Slovyanka
58. Yañı Qıpçaq → Chikarenko
59. Yañı Sala → Rogovo
60. Yañı Tilençi → Nizovoye
61. Yüzler → Mashinovka
62. kolkhoz "Novaya Zhyzn" → Krasnovka
63. sovkhoz "Vibe" → Golikovo

== Dzhankoi Raion ==
1. Abaqlı Tama → Lazurka
2. Acay Qat → Ordenonosnoye
3. Alğazı Qıpçaq → Lisyevka
4. Aq Taş → Pravdinnoye
5. Aqçora → Vasilyevka
6. Ass Caraqçı → Risakovo
7. Avuz Qırq → Medvedovka
8. Babatay → Bolotnoye
9. Birinci Pusurman → Pokosy
10. Biy Suv Küyçe → Yarkoye (By-Su-Kovche)
11. Bogemka → Lobanovo
12. Borlaq Tama → Novokrymskoye
13. Büyük Alqalı → Pushkino
14. Büyük Sunaq → Chirki (Byuyuk-Sonak)
15. Büyük Yaşlav → Repinoye
16. Cadra Borlaq → Zhilino
17. Cadra Şeyh Eli → Udarnoye
18. Can Tuvğan → Lebedinoye
19. Canay → Bobrovoye
20. Caraq → Tutovoye
21. Çoqraq → Strelkovoye
22. Çörelek → Strelkovoye
23. Cumaş Qırq → Morozovoye
24. Cürgün → Mirnoye
25. Dürmen → Pridorozhnoye
26. Ekinci Pusurman → Lugovoye
27. Eski Can Devlet → Zaprudnoye
28. İlk Çoqraq → Istochnoye
29. İrgiz → Zvyozdochka
30. Kadima → Dimovka
31. Keldi Bay → Korniyevka
32. Köremez → Armeyskoye
33. Küçük Alqalı → Zavet-Leninskoye
34. Küçük Sunaq → Milkovodnoye
35. Küçük Tarhan → Chaykovo
36. Lekkert → Balashovka (Ryumshine)
37. Mamut → Glinyanoye
38. Meçetli Qıtay → Stolpovoye
39. Mesit → Safyanovka
40. Mollalar → Smezhnoye
41. Noğaylı Qırq → Nizinnoye
42. Oraq Acı → Mininoye
43. Osman Bükeş → Vodnoye
44. Qamacı → Zarechnoye
45. Qambar Vaqıf → Perepyolkino
46. Qamqalı → Berezhnoye
47. Qaraç Baraç → Solontsevo
48. Qaraca Qat → Martynovka
49. Qırq Bel → Turgenyevo
50. Qırq İşün → Volodino (Tselinnoye)
51. Qurt İçki → Probuzhdeniye
52. Qurtçum Boçala → Bakhchevo
53. Şeyh Eli → Partizany
54. Seyit Bolat → Roskoshnoye (Staroye), Remontnoye (Novoye)
55. Sholom Aleykhem → Koloski
56. Sultan Boçala → Krymka
57. Suran → Anatolyevka
58. Suran Barın → Truzhenik
59. Tarhan Seyitler → Plamennoye
60. Tarhan Sunaq → Ostrovskoye
61. Tarhanlar → Pobednoye
62. Tatar Barın → Ozerki (Tauk)
63. Tav Buzar → Ovoshchevoye
64. Tazanay Kirey → Baklanovoye
65. Teñ Suv → Maslovo
66. Terekli İşün → Krechyotovo
67. Töbey → Zernovoye
68. Toğanaş → Solyonoye Ozero
69. Toğunçı → Yastrebtsy
70. Totay → Yermakovo
71. Toy Töbe → Kovylnoye
72. Tüp Aqçora → Mysovoye
73. Tüp Canköy → Peredmostnoye
74. Tüp Tarhan → Peredovoye
75. Uzun Saqal → Ozyornoye
76. Yañı Aqçora → Chistoye
77. Yañı Bükeş → Obryvnoye
78. Yañı Canköy → Novostepnoye
79. Yañı Toğanaş → Pobeda
80. resettlement plot No. 22 → Yasnopolskoye
81. sovkhoz «Ishun» → Pasovoye
82. 28th plot → Luganskoye

== Fraydorf Raion ==
1. Freidorf (Fraydorf) → Novoselovskoye
2. Acı Atman → Rovno
3. Ağay → Chekhovo
4. Altı Parmaq → Panine
5. Aq Quyu Bitaq → Tyulpanovka
6. Aqtaçı Qaban → Svobodnoye
7. Asan Acı → Zhuravlevka
8. Aydar → Bogata
9. Borağan → Ovrazhnoye
10. Botaş → Chapayevo
11. Boz → Tikhonovka
12. Boz Oğlu Montanay → Vinogradovoye
13. Bulğaq → Ilyinka
14. Büyük Boz Oğlu → Vetrovka
15. Büyük Buzav → Susanino
16. Büyük Qaban → Prostornoye
17. Buzav Aqtaçı → Urozhaynoye
18. Buzul Canköy → Naumovka
19. Celâl → Severnoye
20. Çinke → Kulikovo
21. Çotay → Yakovlev
22. Duvan → Lushino
23. El Toq → Nikiforovka
24. Eski Ali Keç → Alekseyevka
25. Eski Burnaq → Seleznovka
26. Eski Yaşlav → Volodino
27. Freidorf (Fraydorf) → Mayevka
28. Friling → Nikolayevka
29. İlgeri Montanay → Veseloye
30. Kökey → Ilyinka
31. Küçük Qaban → Sovetskoye
32. Mırzalı Bitaq → Vasilkovo
33. Munus → Rogovo
34. Naybryank → Bryanskaya
35. Nayn-Bront → Otkrytoye
36. Nemse Özbek → Fedotovka
37. Oktyabrdorf, Munus → Serebryanka
38. Onfang → Sokoly
39. Öteş → Ognevoye
40. Peretsfeld → Zimino
41. Qadış → Voronki
42. Qara Çora Molla → Shalashi
43. Qarı → Yelizavetovo
44. Qaymaçı → Kovalevka
45. Qocalaq → Krasnoarmeyskoye
46. Qocambaq → Oktyabrskoye
47. Quruvlı → Stolbovaya
48. Ras Bolatçı → Zubovka
49. Rotendorf → Krasnovka
50. Rus Qır Aqtaçı → Daryevka
51. Sarıbaş → Tanine (original name restored in 1991)
52. Secevüt → Soldatskoye
53. Taqıl → Tarasovka
54. Tatar Munus → Marinovka
55. Tatar Özbek → Lebedino
56. Tegeş → Koltsovo
57. Teleş → Priyutnoye
58. Temir Bolat → Zheleznovka
59. Toğaylı → Kormovoye
60. Ulan Eli → Panfilovka

== Ichki Raion ==
1. İçki (Ichki) → Sovetsky
2. Aqköbek → Shakhtnoye
3. Aranda → Pchelovody
4. Belıy Koş → Belostadnoye
5. Beş Qoca → Sharovka
6. Besit → Yermolovka
7. Beys Lehem → Khlebnoye
8. Çatmış → Dmitrovka
9. Ceppar Yurt → Oktyabrskoye
10. Çerkez Tobay → Chapayevka
11. Eseniki → Pushkino
12. Eski Kerlevüt → Almaznoye
13. Eski Qarabay → Dyatlovka
14. Fernheim (Ferngeym) → Urozhaynoye
15. Geyrus → Dmitrovka
16. Karlovka → Nevskaya
17. Keldiyar → Lyublino
18. Mamat Şaqul → Feodosiyskoye
19. Mamat Şaqul → Markovo
20. Mañ Kermen → Lokhovka
21. Muşay → Semyanovka
22. Narimanovka → Obukhovka
23. Nekrasovka → Staraya Nekrasovka
24. Novy Tsyurikhtal → Krasnogvardeyskoye
25. Ökreç → Suvorovo
26. Qapçuq → Korniyevka
27. Qarabay → Rechnoye
28. Qaranki → Vlasovka
29. Qaynaş → Krasnoflotskoye
30. Qazan Pir → Glubinnoye
31. Qır İçki → Semenovo
32. Qırq → Rovenka
33. Qıyanlı → Ilyichevo
34. Qoñrat → Makovka
35. Qul Çora → Nekrasovka
36. Rus Mañ Kermen → Lazarevka
37. Rus Muşay → Maryevka
38. Sarona → Tarasovka
39. Savurçı → Zavitnoye
40. Şeyh Manay → Lebedinka
41. Şoltaq → Nadezhda
42. Tatar Ableş → Likhovoye
43. Toq Taba → Limanka
44. Üç Quyu → Vostochnoye
45. Yañı Kerleut → Chernozemnoye
46. settlement to the west of the village Sovietskoye → Zaozyornoye
47. settlement of the sovkhoz "15 Let VLKSM" → Kolomenskoye
48. sovkhoz Frunze → Frunze

== Kalay Raion ==
1. Qalay (Kalay) → Azovskoye
2. Acı Ahmat → Tabachnoye
3. Alçın → Muromka
4. Aqşeyh → Novoseltsevo
5. Aşağı Alaç → Nizhniye Otrozhki
6. Avuz Kenegez → Novofedorovka
7. Barın → Stalnoye
8. Bay Könçek → Oktyabr
9. Bay Onlar → Rodnoye
10. Bereket → Blizhneye
11. Cenübiy Canköy → Peshkovo
12. Dulat → Zorkoye
13. Ermeni Barın → Artezianskoye
14. Malıy Kut → Tolstoye
15. Manğıt → Kovrovoye
16. Maqut → Budyonovka
17. Meinfeld (Maynfeld) → Mayskoye
18. Mesit → Zashchitnoye
19. Qalay → Klin
20. Qara Töbel → Druzhba
21. Qara Totanay → Polyevoye
22. Qaraca Qat → Vidnoye
23. Qaramiñ → Mikhaylovka
24. Qır Alike → Slivyanka
25. Qul Tamaq → Nezhinskoye
26. Rozenfeld → Rozovka
27. Scheichler (Sheykhler) → Zalivnoye
28. Şimaliy Canköy → Lyubimovka
29. Sırtqı Acı Ahmat → Khlebnoye
30. Slavân Şirin → Slovyanskoye
31. Tarhan → Dvorovoye
32. Tatar Barın → Ozerki
33. Tatar Bay Könçek → Pirogovo
34. Terekli Abaş → Prozrachnoye
35. Töben → Aleynoye
36. Toğanaş Miñ → Velikosellya
37. Totanay → Uyutnoye
38. Tüp Abaş → obyedinili s Kalinovkoy, kotoraya pozdneye ischezla
39. Tüp Kenegez → Kalinovka
40. Tüp Qañğıl → Krayneye
41. Yañı Şirin → Prostornoye
42. Yuqarı Alaç → Verkhniye Otrozhki
43. resettlement plot No. 6 → Larine
44. resettlement plot No. 106 (before 1920s Baş Qırğız) → Kuntseve
45. sovkhoz "Moloday Gvardiya" → Gostinne
46. hamlet Kasyanenko → Peski
47. hamlet Merkulova → Lebedyanka
48. hamlet Treshchova → Glebovo

== Karasubazar Raion ==
1. Qarasuvbazar (Karasubazar) → Belogorsk
2. Acılar → Soldatskoye
3. Alaç → Pestroye
4. Aqqaya → Belaya Skala
5. Arğın → Balki
6. Arğınçıq → Zibini
7. Aylanma → Povorotnoye
8. Az Berdi Vaqıf → Golubovka
9. Azamat → Malinovka
10. Bağça Eli → Bogatoye
11. Barın → Turovka
12. Başı → Golovanovka
13. Beşüy → Chernoslivka
14. Bez Baylan → Radostnoye
15. Biy El → Dorozhnoye
16. Börüs → Nadrechnoye
17. Bürçek → Kirpichnoye
18. Cavluş Qarabay → Mironovka
19. Cemrik → Kizilovka
20. Ceppar → Severnoye
21. Çermalıq → Khmelye
22. Çoqraq → Rodniki
23. Efendiköy → Grushovka
24. İşün → Dozornoye
25. Kökey → Rusakovka
26. Köktaş → Sinyokamenka
27. Köpürliköy → Cheremisovka
28. Küçük Burundıq → Muromskoye
29. Manay → Zarechye
30. Melek → Nekrasovoye
31. Mırzaköy → Divnoye
32. Molbay → Svobodnoye
33. Molla Eli → Piny
34. Musa Biy → Sosedneye
35. Mushash → Vishnevoye
36. Nayman → Chervonoye
37. Ortalan → Zemlyanichnoye
38. Otar → Rodnoye
39. Qaburçaq → Michurinskoye
40. Qadı Eli → Yakovlevka
41. Qalmuq Qarı → Komyshovka
42. Qalpaq → Khlebnoye
43. Qamışlıq → Perelesye
44. Qañğıl → Lugovoye
45. Qara Oba → Prudki
46. Qaraçöl → Chernopolye
47. Qarasuv Başı → Karasovka
48. Qatırşa Saray → Lechebnoye
49. Qışlav → Velkhovka
50. Qurtluq → Pchelinoye
51. Rus Az Berdi → Dlinnoye
52. Sarğıl → Luchevoye
53. Sarı Suv → Novikovo
54. Sartana → Alekseyevka
55. Şavqal → Melniki
56. Semen → Kholmogorye
57. Şeyh Eli → Kozlovka
58. Sobaq Eli → Zarya
59. Sollar → Krasnaya Sloboda
60. Sultan Saray → Ulyanovka
61. Tana Geldi → Sineye
62. Taş Qora → Chernokamenka
63. Tatar Kökey → Vernadovka
64. Tayğan → Ozernoye
65. Tayğan → Yuzhnoozernoye
66. Tekiye → Melekhovo
67. Töben Saray → Krivtsovo
68. Toğay → Pavlovka
69. Toğay Vaqıf → Kalinovka
70. Üç Köz → Novoklenovo
71. Urus Qoca → Russkoye
72. Yañı Cavluş → Zapolye
73. Yañı Saray → Blagodatnoye
74. Yeñi Sala → Krasnoselovka

== Kirovskoye Raion ==
1. İslâm Terek → Kirovskoye
2. Acı Qal → Znamenka
3. Appaq → Zhelanovka
4. Appaq Canköy → Vasilkovka
5. Bağça Eli → Leninskoye
6. Baraq → Sinichnoye
7. Bay Buğa → Blizhneye
8. Bayraç → Zhuravki
9. Büyük Keleçi → Michurinskoye
10. Camçı → Tokarevo
11. Canköy → Podgornoye
12. Çolpan → Zvezdnoye
13. Herzenberg (koloniya Gertsenberg) → Pionerskoye
14. Kiyet → Pobednoye
15. Köbek → Trudolyubovka
16. Kökey → Ostrovnoye
17. Köp Otuz → Belozerka
18. Körpeç → Ptichye
19. Küçük Keleçi → Privetnoye
20. Kürey Başı → Vinogradnoye
21. Mambet Acı → Lugovoye
22. Nasipköy → Nasypnoye
23. Ortay → Frunzevo
24. Porpaç → Yachmennoye
25. Qıpçaq → Druzhnoye
26. Qırım Şiban → Kholmogorki
27. Qızıl Terçek → Yarkoye Pole
28. Qoran Eli → Beregovoye
29. Qoy Asan → Frontovoye
30. Setkin → Stepnoye
31. Şeyh Eli → Partizany
32. Seyit Asan → Svetlaya
33. Seyit Eli → Zhuravki
34. Shubino-Baykodzha, formerly Bay Qoca → Shubino
35. Sultan Sala → Yuzhnoye
36. Tatar Asan Bay → Izobilnoye
37. Tulumçaq → Sinevo
38. Unğut → Muchnoye
39. Uzaq Bay Buğa → Boyevoye
40. Yañı Basalaq → Krasnoselskoye
41. Yerçi → Krasnovka
42. Yunan Asan Bay → Makovskoye
43. settlement of the sovkhoz estate Arma Eli → Kharchenkovo

== Krasnoperekopsk Raion ==
1. Adiy Qıyğaç → Sobolevo
2. As Nayman → Dnestrovka
3. Ass → Proletarka
4. Bay Sarı → Bogachevka
5. Berdi Bolat → Privolnoye
6. Beş Avul → Pyatigorye
7. Bezshchasne → Zelyonaya Niva
8. Birinci Qart Qazaq → Zalivnoye
9. Biy Boluş → Orlovskoye
10. Bosterçi → Utkino
11. Bozğana → Shatry
12. Büyük Mamçıq → Muravyevo
13. Büyük Qıyat → Komyshevka
14. Çalbaş → Mayorskoye
15. Celişay → Sokol
16. Çorum → Mezhozernoye
17. Dede → Kurayevka
18. Eski Çuvaş → Shturmovoye
19. Gormir-Droshak → Myasnikovo
20. İngiz → Iskhodnoye
21. Küçük Qıyat → Krepkoye
22. Magnit No.2 → Poltavskoye
23. Nemse Berdi Bolat → Beryozovka
24. Orta Saray → Sredneye
25. Qalançaq → Traktovoye
26. Qara Canay → Samokishevo
27. Qart Qazaq → Tavriyskoye
28. Qırq → Limanka
29. Qış Qara → Kurgannoye
30. Qula → Voloshinoye
31. Sultanaş → Svatovo
32. Tarhan → Vishnyovka
33. Tatar Kütüke → Zlatopol
34. Tikhonovka and 4th state-owned plot → Tikhonovka
35. Üç Cılğa → Suvorovo
36. Yalan Tuş → Bratskoye
37. Yañı Celişay → Ilyinka
38. Yañı Çuvaş → Novosyolovka
39. Yañı Yalan Tuş → Kazachye
40. plot No. 5 → "Pochetne"
41. plot No. 9 → "Tankove"
42. kolkhoz "Krasnyi Oktyabr" → "Krasnyi Oktyabr"
43. kolkhoz "Budyonnyi" → "Chumakove"

== Kuibysheve Raion ==
1. Albat → Kuybishevoye
2. Ayırgül → Solnechnoselye
3. Büyük Özenbaş → Schaslivoye
4. Büyük Qaralez → Krasny Mak
5. Büyük Süyren → Tankovoye
6. Çerkez Kermen → Krepkoye
7. Foti-Sala → Golubinka
8. Ğavr → Otradnoye
9. Kermençik → Vysokoye
10. Kökköz → Sokolinoye
11. Kokluz → Bogataya Ushchelina
12. Küçük Özenbaş → Klyuchevoye
13. Marqur → Polyana
14. Otarçıq → Novoulyanovka
15. Otarköy → Frontovoye
16. Tatar Osman → Zelenoye
17. Yancu → Putilovka
18. Yañı Sala → Novopolye
19. Yuqarı Qaralez → Zalisnoye

== Larindorf Raion ==
1. Larindorf (before 1920s Sırt-Çaylav) → Krestyanovka
2. Abaqlı → Prosyanka
3. Aqçora → Gvardeyskoye
4. Aqmeçit Nayman (Akmechit-Nayman) → Shchedrino
5. Aybar → Voykovo
6. Başbek → Avrorovka
7. Biyeç Nayman → Stolbtsy
8. Bozgöz Qıtay → Spokoyny
9. Burçı → Dalneye
10. Büyük Boraş → Kholmistoye
11. Büyük Qoñrat → Bratskoye
12. Curçı → Pervomayskoye
13. Der-Emes (Yiddish: דער עמעס) → Pravda
14. Dürmen → Maksimovka
15. Freidorf (Fraydorf) → Chernovoye
16. İlgeri Qaraq → Gorlovka
17. Judendorf (Yudendorf) → Oktyabrskoye
18. Kirey → Makarovka
19. Kögenli Qıyat → Kropivnoye
20. Könçi Şava → Krasnodarka
21. Küçük Qıtay → Reshetnikovoye
22. Kütüke → Melnichnoye
23. Lekkert → Snegirovka
24. Maifeld (Mayfeld) → Mayskoye
25. Muniy → Stepnoye
26. Neidorf (Naydorf) → Bugristoye
27. Neindorf (Nayndorf) → Novaya Derevnya
28. Nayman → Yuzhnoye
29. Orcaq Cabu → Abrikosovoye
30. Orman Acı → Kalininets
31. Oy Mamşaq → Dmitrovka
32. Qıyat → Ostrovskoye
33. Qıyat Orqa → Upornoye
34. Qullar Qıpçaq → Krasnaya Ravnina
35. Rus Calayır → Zapadnoye
36. Seyit Bolat → Stalnoye
37. Şiğay → Griboyedovo
38. Şigim → Matveyevka
39. Sırt Qaraq Çora → Danilovka
40. Stalinstadt → Arbuzovoye
41. Tatar Boz Göz → Vesnovka
42. Tatar Calayır → Parkhomenko
43. Terekli Qıtay → Rillevoye
44. Toqulçaq → Grishine
45. Totman → Kashtanovka
46. Üçevli Orqa → Pshenichnoye
47. Yahşı Bay → Khoroshevoye
48. Yapınca → Vipasnoye
49. plot No. 123 → Levitanovka
50. plot No. 74 Luksemburg → Olenovka
51. plot No. 75 → Budyonovo
52. plot No. 86 → Baranovka
53. settlement near the shell rock quarry → Rakushechnoye

== Lenine Raion ==
1. Acı Mende → Fedorovka
2. Adıq → Chernishevskoye
3. Ali Bay → Uvarovo
4. Alibay → Zemlyanki
5. Aq Manay → Kamenskoye
6. Aqtaş → Belokamenka
7. Arabat → Rybachye
8. Arğın Töbeçik → Romanovo
9. Arma Eli → Batalnoye
10. Astaban → Chapayevo
11. Astanino (near railway station Oysul) → Ostanino
12. Atan Alçın → Dalneye
13. Ayıp Eli → Lugovoye
14. Babıq → Plodorodnoye
15. Baş Qırğız → Yarkoye
16. Büyük Arpaç → Gavrilenkovo
17. Cağa Secevüt → Yuzhnoye
18. Çal Temir → Zhuravlevka
19. Can Toru → Lvovo
20. Cav Töbe → Vulkanovka
21. Çegirçi → Plavnye
22. Ceppar Berdi → Bezvodnoye
23. Cermay Qaşıq → Slyusarevo
24. Çuqul → Vinogradnoye
25. Harcı Biye → Storozhevoye
26. İlgeri Qıpçaq → Sinokosnoye
27. İlgeri Qocañki → Stepnoye
28. Kiten → Semenovka
29. Köl Alçın → Zaychino
30. Köp Kenegez → Krasnogorka
31. Köp Qıpçaq → Voykovoye
32. Körpe → Kalinovka
33. Krasny Kut → Zavodskoye
34. Mamat → Seleznevka
35. Manğıt → Ulyanovka
36. Mavluş → Karasovka
37. Meskeçi → Pesochnoye
38. Minareli Şiban → Yerofeyevo
39. Nasır → Naberezhnoye
40. Öbekçi Qarsa → Nizovoye
41. Oğuz Töbe → Krasnoarmeyskoye
42. Oysul → Komyshinka
43. Qara Quyu → Ilyichevo
44. Qara Secevut → Sazonovka
45. Qaraç → Kuybyshevo
46. Qaranğıt → Chernomorskoye
47. Qarı → Vostochnoye
48. Qarsan → Krasnoflotskoye
49. Qayalı Sart → Vysokoye
50. Qazan Tip → Misovoye
51. Qazan Tip Kosa → Rybnoye
52. Qıyat → Brannoye Pole
53. Qocalar → Korolevo
54. Qoñrat → Krasnovka
55. Qoşay → Andreyevo
56. Sarılar → Belobrovskoye
57. Taş Alçın → Krasnopolye
58. Taşlı Yar → Zeleny Yar
59. Tatar Çuqul → Sergeyevo
60. Tatar Eski Qazan → Afanasyevo
61. Tatar Qocalar → Dolinnaya
62. Tayğuç → Doroshenkovo
63. Uzun Ayaq → Shirokoye
64. Wojkowstadt (Voykovshtadt) → Kirovskoye
65. settlement near Ak-Manay station → Petrovskoye
66. settlement Selprom → Solyanoye

== Mayak Salyn Raion ==
1. Mayaq Salın (Mayak Salyn) → Primorskoye
2. Acı Bay → Novootradnoye
3. Acı Eli → Derzhavnoye
4. Acı Muşqay → Partizany
5. Aqköz → Chernyakovo
6. Marientahl (Mariental; formerly known as Aqköz) → Gornostaevka
7. Asqar Beş Quyu → Fadeyevo
8. Ayman Quyu → Repyevka
9. Baqsı → Glazovka
10. Baş Avul → Goluboye
11. Bikeç → Tamarino
12. Bulğanaq → Bondarenkovo
13. Büyük Babçıq → Pamyatnoye
14. Canköy → Kamenka
15. Caylav → Miroshnikovo
16. Çegene → Zolotoye
17. Cer Cava → Voskhod
18. Cılqıcı Eli → Ptashkino
19. Çolaçıq → Starozhilovo
20. Çöñgelek → Kostirnoye
21. Çörelek → Strelkovoye
22. Çuqur Qoyaş → Tarasovka
23. Çürübaş → Priozernoye
24. El Tiygen → Geroyevskoye
25. Kez → Krasnopolyana
26. Könçek → Trigirnoye
27. Köp Taqıl → Korenkovo
28. Küçük Babçıq → Okopnaya
29. Nemse Beş Tarım → Kutykovo
30. Opuk → Svetlyachki
31. Orta Eli → Ogonki
32. Palapan → Belinskoye
33. Qamış Burun → Arshintsevo
34. Qarama → Orlovka
35. Qarav → Pashchenkovo
36. Qıdırlez → Voykovo
37. Qız Avul → Yakovenkovo
38. Qoş Quyu → Tasunovo
39. Sandıq Quyu → Novikovo
40. Saray Miñ → Sokolskoye
41. Şeyh Asan → Vyaznikovo
42. Suin Eli → Borisovka
43. Tashliyar → Stantsionnoye
44. Tatar Çürübaş → Gorodnoye
45. Töbeçik → Chelyabintsevo
46. Uzunlar → Prostornoye
47. Yanış Taqıl → Zavetnoye
48. Yeñi Qale → Sipyagino
49. Yuqarı Köçegen → Visokoye
50. Yurgakov Kut → Yurkino
51. Zamorsk → Verkhnezamorskoye
52. settlement near Durande station → Prychalnoye
53. settlement of the subsidiary khozyaystvo of raypishchkombinat → Prudnikovoye
54. settlement of the fishing industry → Nizhnezamorskoye
55. settlement of the kolkhoz "Sacco i Vanzetti" → Yegorovo

== Saky Raion ==
1. Abuzlar → Vodopoynoye
2. Alaç → Sukhodolnoye
3. Ali Bay → Voronovo
4. Aqköz → Beloglazovo
5. Arap → Konstantinovo
6. Aşağı Camin → Gorkovskoye
7. Avel → Krymskoye
8. Aydar Ğazı → Orlyanka
9. Ayış → Volnoye
10. Bağaylı → Priozernoye
11. Başmaq → Runnoye
12. Bay Geldi → Trudovoye
13. Beşüy Eli → Vershinnoye
14. Bulğanaq → Kolchugino
15. Büyük Aqtaçı → Garshevo
16. Büyük Boraş → Bezlesnoye
17. Büyük Toq Saba → Nadezhdino
18. Cabaç → Petrovka
19. Cağa Quşçu → Okhotnikovo
20. Dörtkül → Rozdollya
21. Eski Cabaç → Lukyanovka
22. Eski Lez → Skvortsovo
23. Eski Qarağurt → Dolinka
24. Goropashnik → Novosyolovka
25. Hortenstadt → Zhuravli
26. İbraim Bay → Zhayvoronki
27. Küçük Aqtaçı → Kulikovka
28. Küçük Baraş → Baranovka
29. Küçük Toq Saba (Kuchuk-Toksaba) → Rovnoye
30. Kün Tuvğan → Teplovka
31. Mavluş → Vipasnoye
32. Oktoberfeld → Yarkoye
33. Qadır Balı → Kiyevka
34. Qalpe Eli → Gnezdovka
35. Qamışlı → Ivanovka
36. Qara Çora → Klyuchevoye
37. Qara Töbe → Priberezhnoye
38. Qotur → Gromovka
39. Sabançı → Pakhari
40. Saltaba → Dalneye
41. Saya → Sizovka
42. Temeş → Shovkovichnoye
43. Temeş Vaqıf → Yastrebkovoye
44. Teşiy → Krayneye
45. Topalovka → Nizinnoye
46. Tümen → Ovrazhnoye
47. Tuzlı → Mikhaylovka
48. Üç Quyu Tarhan → Kolodeznoye
49. Urçuq → Lugovoye
50. Vojo Nova → Listovoye
51. Yañı Lez → Mezhgornoye
52. Yañı Qarağurt → Mityayevo
53. Yañı Qotur → Karyernoye
54. Yuqarı Camin → Valentinovo
55. 41st resettlement plot, Saky resort station → Peredovoye
56. settlement of the branch of the sovkhoz VTsRPS → Ovochnoye
57. settlement of the 5th branch of the sovkhoz "Krymskyi" → Davidovka
58. settlement of the 5th separate sovkhoz "Krymskyi" → Igorevka
59. settlement of the central estate of the sovkhoz "Frunze" → Frunze

== Seyitler Raion ==
1. Seyitler → Nizhnegorsky
2. Acı Beşir → Prisadovoye
3. Ali Keç → Okhotskoye
4. Ay Qış → Rodniki
5. Azizköy → Demyanovka
6. Beş Aran → Semyanovka
7. Beş Qurtqa → Tambovka
8. Biy Ğazı → Kirsanovka
9. Burnaş → Uvarovka
10. Büyük Eşkene → Kistochkovka
11. Cağa Beş Qurtqa and Ivanovka → Ivanovka
12. Cağa Qıpçaq → Luzhki
13. Cağa Qıpçaq → Luzhki
14. Calayır → Yastrubki
15. Calayır Çotı → Strepetovo
16. Caytamğalı → Omelyanovka
17. Çelebiler → Plodovoye
18. Çotı → Zhemchuzhina
19. Çuça Vaqıf → Lineynoye
20. Dörte → Zarechye
21. Dörte and Urusnıñki Qıpçaq → Likhachevo
22. Körpe Vaqıf → Vodnoye
23. Küçük Eşkene → Serovoye
24. Malyi Matis and Vekiliy Matis → Drofine
25. Miñ Cabu → Minino
26. Nemse Taymaz → Aksakovo
27. Noğaylı Ahmat → Chervonoye
28. Qazan Pir → Sadovoye
29. Qazanki Vaqıf → Senokosnoye
30. Qıpçaq → Krinichki
31. Qıpçaq → Vereshchagino
32. Qızıl Körpe → Tsvetushcheye
33. Rus Biy Ğazı and Karpovka → Dvorishche
34. Semekysh and Yakimovka → Yakimovka
35. Setkin → Burevestnik
36. Seyitler Vaqıf → Rozlivy
37. Shchaslivtseve → Zelenoye
38. Tabun Adarğın → Drozdovka
39. Tamaq → Izobilnoye
40. Taymaz → Trudolyubovka
41. Tomak → Kulichki
42. Tomak → Sadovody
43. Yañı Çembay → Korennoye
44. resettlement plot No.15 → Lomonosovoye

== Simferopol Raion ==
1. Acı İbram → Klyuchi
2. Ağaç Eli → Zavetnoye
3. Aliköy → Blizhneye
4. Ana Eli → Zagorskoye
5. Anğara → Perevalnoye
6. Aqtaçı Qıyat → Beloglinka
7. Aratuq → Klinovka
8. Atman → Veseloye
9. Azat → Storozhevoye
10. Badana → Perovoye
11. Baraq Eli → Baraki
12. Bavurçı → Kamenka
13. Beki Eli → Zhivopisnoye
14. Beşüy → Drovyanka
15. Bitaq → Prigorodnoye
16. Bolgrad → Belgrad
17. Bor Çoqraq → Zavodskoye
18. Bötke → Balki
19. Bötke → Dubki
20. Bulğanaq Badraq → Pozharskoye
21. Bura → Lazarevka
22. Büyük Yanköy → Mramornoye
23. Cabanaq → Kubanskoye
24. Cafer Berdi → Druzhnoye
25. Cañatay → Ivanovka
26. Çavke → Sorokine
27. Çeşmeci → Teploye
28. Colman → Pionerskoye
29. Colmançıq → Detskoye
30. Çoyunçı → Brusilovo
31. Çumaq Qarı → Obryv
32. Çuqurça → Lugovoye
33. Çüyke → Chaykino
34. Eki Taş → Dvukamenka
35. Eskender → Kovylnoye
36. Eski Abdal → Zagorodnoye
37. Eski Orda → Lozovoye
38. Eski Saray → Monetnoye
39. Keldiyar → Lyubimovka
40. Kiçkene → Malenkoye
41. Kürlük Suv → Polyanka
42. Mamaq → Strogonovka
43. Mamut Sultan → Dobroye
44. Miñlerçik → Zhuravlevka
45. Molla Eli → Komyshinka
46. Musa Acı Eli → Sverdlovo
47. Nor-Gyang (Armenian: նոր կյանք) → Kolonka
48. Paylary → Zapovednoye
49. Qambar → Stepnoye
50. Qamış Qora → Komyshevo
51. Qara Qıyat → Fruktovoye
52. Qara Qıyat → Zamoste
53. Qaraç → Trudolyubovo
54. Qaraça Qañğıl → Krasnaya Zvezda
55. Qart Mışıq → Shirokoye
56. Qıl Burun → Gorkiye
57. Qızıl Qoba → Krasnopechernoye
58. Qoyaş → Vodnoye
59. Qulçuq → Rodnikovoye
60. Qulumbet Eli → Solnechnoye
61. Qurçı → Ukrainka
62. Rus Sarabuz → Solovyevka
63. Sabla → Partizanskoye
64. Sarabuz → Gvardeyskoye
65. Saraylı Qıyat → Kakhovskoye
66. Seymanlarköy → Novozburyevka
67. Şonuq → Rozdolnoye
68. Suin Acı → Denisovka
69. Şumhay → Zarechnoye
70. Tahta Cami → Andrusovo
71. Taqıl → Arkadiyevka
72. Tatar Sarabuz → Kadrovo
73. Tavel → Krasnolesye
74. Tavşan Bazar → Privolnoye
75. Tegeş → Iskra
76. Temir Ağa → Sovkhoznoye
77. Temir Köy Aratuq → Mayskoye
78. Terek Eli → Triprudnoye
79. Teren Ayır → Glubokoye
80. Ters Qondı → Polyarnik
81. Tirke → Chaykovskoye
82. Tirke → Sineye
83. Töbe Çoqraq → Stavki
84. Totayköy → Fersmanovo
85. Ulu Çoqraq → Kurgannoye
86. Veyrat → Novoivanovka
87. Yağmurça → Fontany
88. Yañı Abdal → Beloye
89. Yañı Qulçuq → Zolnoye
90. Yañı Sarabuz → Lenskoye
91. Yuqarı Sabla → Verkhniye Partizany
92. settlement of the kolkhoz "Pervaya krymskaya kommuna" → Mokrousovo
93. settlement to the southeast of the village Kubanskoye → Ushakove

== Staryi Krym Raion ==
1. Köktöbel (Koktebel) → Planerskoye (original name restored in 1991))
2. Aqçora Vaqıf → Zelenogorskoye
3. Aqmelez → Klyuchovoye
4. Baraq Köl → Nanikovo
5. Boran Eli → Kashtany
6. Bulğanaq → Dobrolyubovka
7. Bulğar Kruglik → Matrosovka
8. Burundıq → Suslovo
9. Çelebi Eli → Yastrubki
10. Cuma Eli → Privetnoye
11. Esen Eli → Babenkovo
12. İşün → Malye Prudy
13. Koloniya Bolgarskaya → Krasnoye Selo
14. Muratça Saray → Donskoye
15. Nayman → Abrikosovka
16. Osmançıq → Kholodovka
17. Ötemiş Eli → Gogolevka
18. Qamışlıq → Opitnoye
19. Qapıstalıq → Sadovoye
20. Qaragöz → Goncharovka
21. Qaşqa Çoqraq → Otvazhnoye
22. Qışlav → Kurskoye
23. Romaş Eli → Romanovka
24. Şeyh Mamay → Ayvazovskoye
25. Suv Baş → Zolotoy Klyuch
26. Suvuq Sala → Grushevka
27. Toplu → Topolevka
28. Toply Verkhniye → Michurino
29. Tuvuş Aqçora → Dolinnoye
30. Yañı Qarabay → Vozrozhdeniye
31. Yañı Şah Mırza → Kalinovka
32. Yunan Canköy → Svetloye
33. Zürichtahl (Tsyurikhtal), before 1805 Caylav Saray (Dzhaylav-Saray) → Zolotoye Pole

== Sudak Raion ==
1. Arpat → Zelenogorye
2. Ay Serez → Mezhrechye
3. El Buzlu → Perevalovka
4. Otuz → Shchebetovka
5. Qapsihor → Morskoye
6. Qoz → Lagernoye (not later than in 1968 was renamed to Solnechnaya Dolina)
7. Qutlaq → Veseloye
8. Şelen → Gromovka
9. Taraq Taş → Dachnoye
10. Telmana → Novy Svet
11. Toqluq → Bogatovka

== Telman Raion ==
1. Adarğın → Muskatnoye
2. Aleksandrovka 4 → Pugachevo
3. Alğazı Qoñrat → Pobednoye
4. Antonovka Armyanskaya → Nizhnyaya Antonovka
5. Antonovka Russkaya → Verkhnyaya Antonovka
6. Başlıça → Trudovoye
7. Bek Bolatçı → Yakimovka
8. Bek Qazı → Rubinovka
9. Berlik → Znamenka
10. Boranğar → Konstantinovka
11. Borlaq → Krasnodolnoye
12. Burçı → Polyushkino
13. Burçı Kondaraki → Kolpino
14. Büyük Qarcav → Chkalovo
15. Cağa Başı → Lisichki
16. Cağa Çelebi → Razino
17. Çalbaş → Dokhodnoye
18. Can Boldı → Nakhodka
19. Can Boldı Vaqıf → Slavyanka
20. Canğara → Vidnoye
21. Cañı Kesek → Timoshevka
22. Çaqmaq → Kremnyovka
23. Car Quyu → Sernovodskoye
24. Cav Börü → Tikhomirovka
25. Dzhankoy Nemetskiy → Blizhnegorodskoye
26. Egre Eli → Molochnoye
27. Eski Bayavut → Mironovka
28. Freidorf (Fraydorf) → Novoseltsy
29. Freileben (Frayleben) → Volnoye
30. Ishun-Nemetskiy (Nemse İşün) → Kovylnoye
31. İşün → Udachnoye
32. Johannesfeld (Ioganisfeld, Iogannesfeld) → Makedonovka
33. Kalinindorf → Kalinine
34. Kence → Mirolyubovka
35. Kence Taşlı Qoñrat → Butovka
36. Kökçora Qıyat → Blizhneye
37. Kökteyin → Plodorodnoye
38. Kül Oba → Nevskoye
39. Mare → Maryanovka
40. Mırzalar Kemelçi → Shcherbakovo
41. Mişen → Nakhimovo
42. Musa Biy Adarğın → Studenoye
43. Neidorf (Naydorf) → Nikolayevo
44. Nemse Qaranğut → Arbuzovka
45. Neu Liebentahl (Ney-Libental) → Novodolinka
46. Neuhoffnungstahl (Neygofnungstal) → Vladimirovo
47. Neusprotzung (Neyshprotsung) → Chapayevo
48. Novokarlovka → Yegorovka
49. Euflenburg (Oyflenburg) → Zarya
50. Qadır Acı → Maloye
51. Qara Asan → Rovnoye
52. Qara Çaqmaq → Brusilovo
53. Qaravul Canğara → Karpovka
54. Qarcav Vaqıf → Chizhovka
55. Qocanğul → Vavilovo
56. Qodağay → Vishnevka
57. Qurman → Krasnogvardeyskoye
58. Quru Cılğa Şeyh Eli → Krasnoye
59. Rotendorf → Klimovo
60. Rus Qaranğut → Timiryazevo
61. Samav → Izvestkovo
62. Sultan Bazar → Mostovaya
63. Taş Qazğan Qoñrat → Karyernoye
64. Taşlı Dayır → Yantarnoye
65. Taşlı Qıpçaq → Klepinino
66. Taşlı Qoñrat → Krasnoarmeyskoye
67. Taşlı Şeyh Eli → Besedino
68. Tatar Aqsürü Qoñrat → Kondratyevo
69. Temir → Yastrubovka
70. Terekli İşün → Anastasyevo
71. Tsarevkichi → Pushkino
72. Venera → Voznesenovka
73. Yañı Bayavut → Protochnoye
74. Yaqub → Zernovoye
75. settlement of the 2nd branch of the sovkhoz "Bolshevik" → Novomykolskoye
76. settlement of the 3rd branch of the sovkhoz "Bolshevik" → Nekrasovo
77. settlement to the north of the village Krasnogvardiyskoye → Petrovka
78. settlement of the sovkhoz "Bolshevik" → Novokaterinovka

== Yalta Raion ==
1. Autka → Chekhovo
2. Ay Danil → Danilovka
3. Ay Vasıl → Vasilyevka
4. Çukurlar → Ayvazovskaya
5. Degirmenköy → Zaprudnoye
6. Dereköy → Ushchelnoye
7. Kikineiz → Opolznevoye
8. Küçükköy → Beketovo
9. Küçükköy → Pushkino
10. Kürkület → Podgornoye
11. Limena → Goluboy Zaliv
12. Mşatka → Yuzhny
13. Muhalatka → Snitovskoye
14. Partenit → Frunzenskoye (original name restored in 1991)
15. Qızıltaş → Krasnokamenka
16. Suuk Su → Pionerskoye

== Yevpatoria Raion ==
1. Alçın → Velikoye
2. Apan → Pyatikhatka
3. Ayırça → Vitino
4. Aysa Bay → Utrennya Zarya
5. Bağay → Suvorovskoye
6. Bölek Acı → Privolnoye
7. Cağa Moynaq → Peschanka
8. Çayan → Zaporozhskaya
9. Colçaq → Komsomolskoye
10. Ikor (before 1923 Soqur Quyu) → Romashkovoye
11. Kañğıl → Glinka
12. Kizil-Gabin → Privolnoye
13. Kögeneş → Vladnoye
14. Komzetovka (before 1927 Quruvlı Kenegez) → Veresayevo
15. Küçük Orta Mamay → Tunelnoye
16. Küçük Tegeş → Niva
17. Mambet Eli → Zolnoye
18. Mamut Bay → Furmanovo
19. Mamut Quy → Uzlovaya
20. Merezhinoye (before 1933 Maliy) → Natashine
21. Neidorf (Naydorf) → Shishkino
22. Nemse Tegeş → Glubokoye
23. Oñğut → Abrikosovka
24. Oraz → Koloski
25. Orta Mamay №4 → Zheltokamenka
26. Orta Mamay №6 → Verkhnyaya
27. Otar → Veselovka
28. Otar Moynaq → Uyutnoye
29. Oybur → Krylovka
30. Oyburçıq → Burevestnik
31. Qabaç → Shcheglovka
32. Qaralar → Chernushki
33. Qaralar Qıpçaq → Beloglinka
34. Qarp Oğlu → Snezhnoye
35. Qayalı Kenegez → Mirnoye
36. Qudayğul → Vorobyevo
37. Quruvlı Qıpçaq → Samsonovo
38. Rus Marğalfe → Trenevo
39. Rus Taşke → Vybornoye
40. Sarıça → Bashtanovka
41. Şiban → Pobednoye
42. Tatar Marğalfe → Mayakovskaya
43. Tatar Taşke → Chesnokovo
44. Terekli Qoñrat → Molochnoye
45. Tüp Mamay → Ostrovka
46. Yalı Moynaq → Zaozernoye
47. settlement of the podsobkhoz of Vsekoopinsoyuzstrakhkass → Izvestkovaya
48. sovkhoz "Acı Bayçı" → Khutorok

== Zuya Raion ==
1. Arğınçıq → Umeloye
2. Aşağı Asma → Kurgannoye
3. Aşağı Fındıqlı → Nizhniye Oreshniki
4. Baqsan → Mezhgorye
5. Beş Aran Otar → Novozhilovka
6. Beş Terek → Donskaya (Kerneuch)
7. Beş Terek → Novaya Mazanka
8. Biy Eli → Gorlinka
9. Boçala → Udarnoye
10. Borağan → Okhotnichye
11. Burashan → Melovaya
12. Canköy (Dzhankoy) → Odinokaya
13. Çuqurça (Kukurcha) → Krasnogorskoye (Neyzats)
14. Dermenci → Spokoynoye
15. Eski Burulça → Dolinovka
16. Han Toquz → Kurortnoye
17. Keñ Toğay → Litvinenkovo
18. Qadıköy (Kadikoy) → Sukhorechye
19. Qalmuq Qarı → Dmitrovo
20. Qaya Astı → Podgornoye
21. Qaynavut → Ovrazhki
22. Qırq → Krasny Krym
23. Qızıl Meçit → Krasnenkaya
24. Qoñrat (Konrat) → Paseka
25. Rosentahl (Rozental) → Aromatnoye
26. Şeyhköy → Davidovo
27. Tav Dayır → Lesosechnoye
28. Tav Qıpçaq → Lesnaya
29. Terekli Şeyh Eli → Melnichnaya
30. Töbenkӧy → Ukrainskoye
31. Tökey Eli → Fontanka
32. Tolban → Opushki
33. Tuvatay → Skvortsovo
34. Yañı Burulça → Tsvetochnoye
35. Yañı Qırımçaq → Novy Krym
36. Yuqarı Asma → Verkhnekurgannoye
37. Yuqarı Fındıqlı → Verkhniye Oreshniki

== See also ==
- De-Tatarization of Crimea
