= Vuzka Bay =

Bay in Ukraine

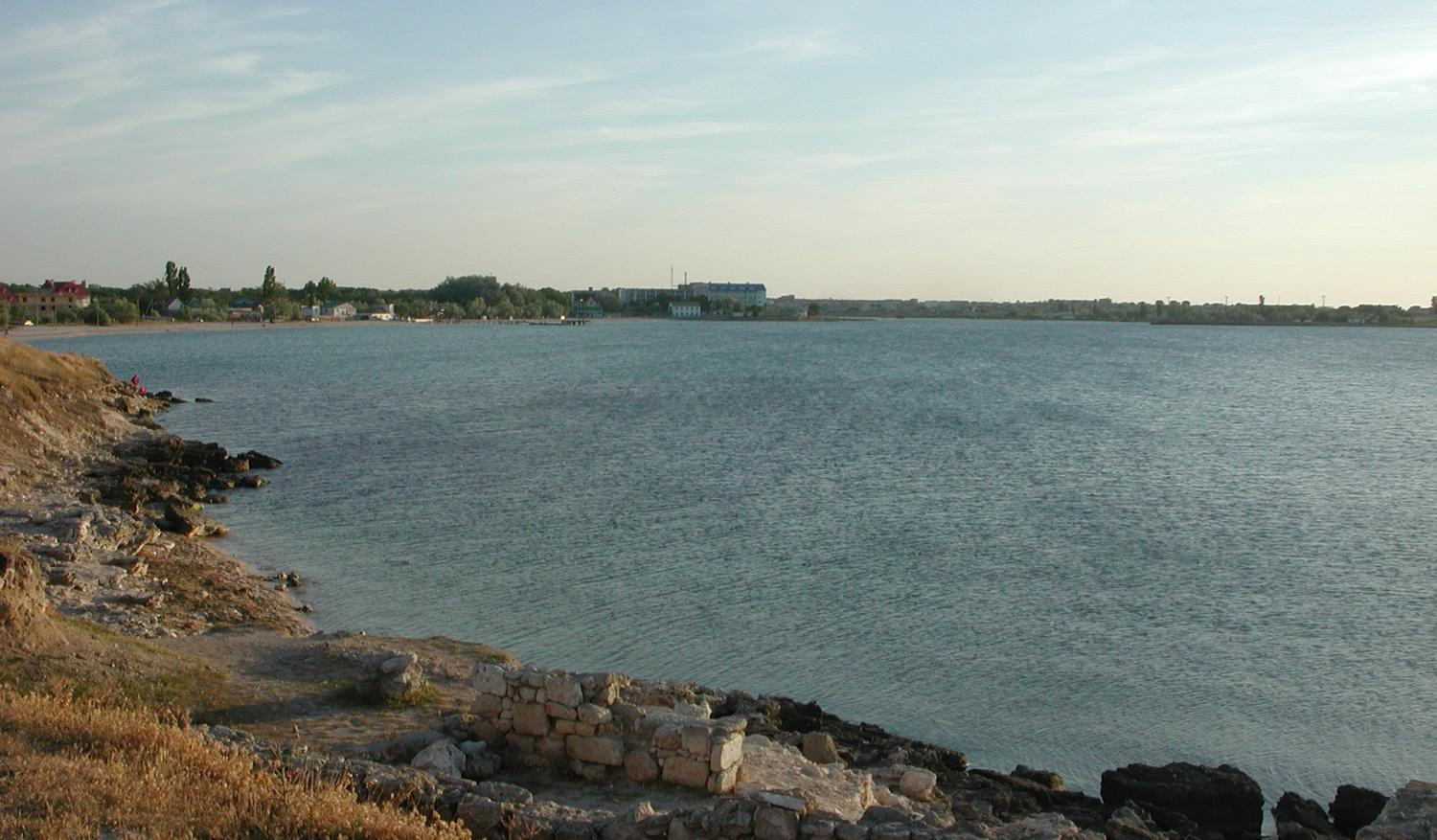

- Location within Crimea
- Interactive map of Vuzka Bay
- Location: Black Sea
- Coordinates: 45°31′09″N 32°42′10″E
- Ocean/sea sources: Atlantic Ocean
- Basin countries: Ukraine; Russia (disputed)
- Average depth: 0–10 m (0–33 ft)
- Max. depth: 12 m (39 ft)
- Settlements: Chornomorske

Vuzka Bay (Crimean Tatar: Tar körfez, Тар корьфез; Ukrainian: Вузька бухта, romanized: Vuzka bukhta, lit. 'narrow bay'; Russian: Узкая бухта, romanized: Uzkaya bukhta) is a bay that forms part of the Karkinit Bay in the Black Sea. Its former name was Ak-Mechet Bay. The depth ranges from 0 to 12 metres. The shore of the bay runs along Chornomorske, an urban-type settlement in the Autonomous Republic of Crimea, Ukraine, currently annexed by Russia. The ruins of the ancient Greek colony of Kalos Limen are located on its shore. The sandy bay is 6 kilometres long, with no rivers flowing into it. There are several recreational facilities in the area.

The bay hosts a boat depot where the Russian Navy stores patrol boats.

== History ==
On 10 November 2023, during the Russian invasion of Ukraine, Ukrainian military intelligence (HUR) reported they had destroyed two Russian landing boats in the area; one Serna-class landing craft and one Ondatra-class landing craft.

On 6 May 2024, a Russian high-speed Mangust-class patrol boat was destroyed in the bay.

On 30 May 2024, the HUR reported they had destroyed two Russian KS-701 Tunets-class patrol boats and damaged two other patrol boats in the bay.
