= De-Tatarization of Crimea =

- Part of Russian imperialism, Russification and forced population transfer in the Soviet Union
- Line chart showing the impact of demographic engineering on three ethnic groups in Crimea between 1770 and 2014. In the two centuries following the Russian Empire's annexation of the Crimean Khanate in 1783, Crimean Tatars were squeezed out of the peninsula and supplanted by Russians and Ukrainians.
- Location: Crimea
- Date: 1783–1917; 18–20 May 1944
- Target: Crimean Tatars
- Attack type: Forced population transfer, ethnic cleansing, genocide
- Deaths: Up to 195,471 (1944)
- Victims: 4,000,000 expelled (1783–1917); Up to 423,100 deported (1944)
- Perpetrators: Russian Empire (1783–1917); Soviet Union (1944)
- Motive: Tatarophobia, Islamophobia, Russification, Colonialism

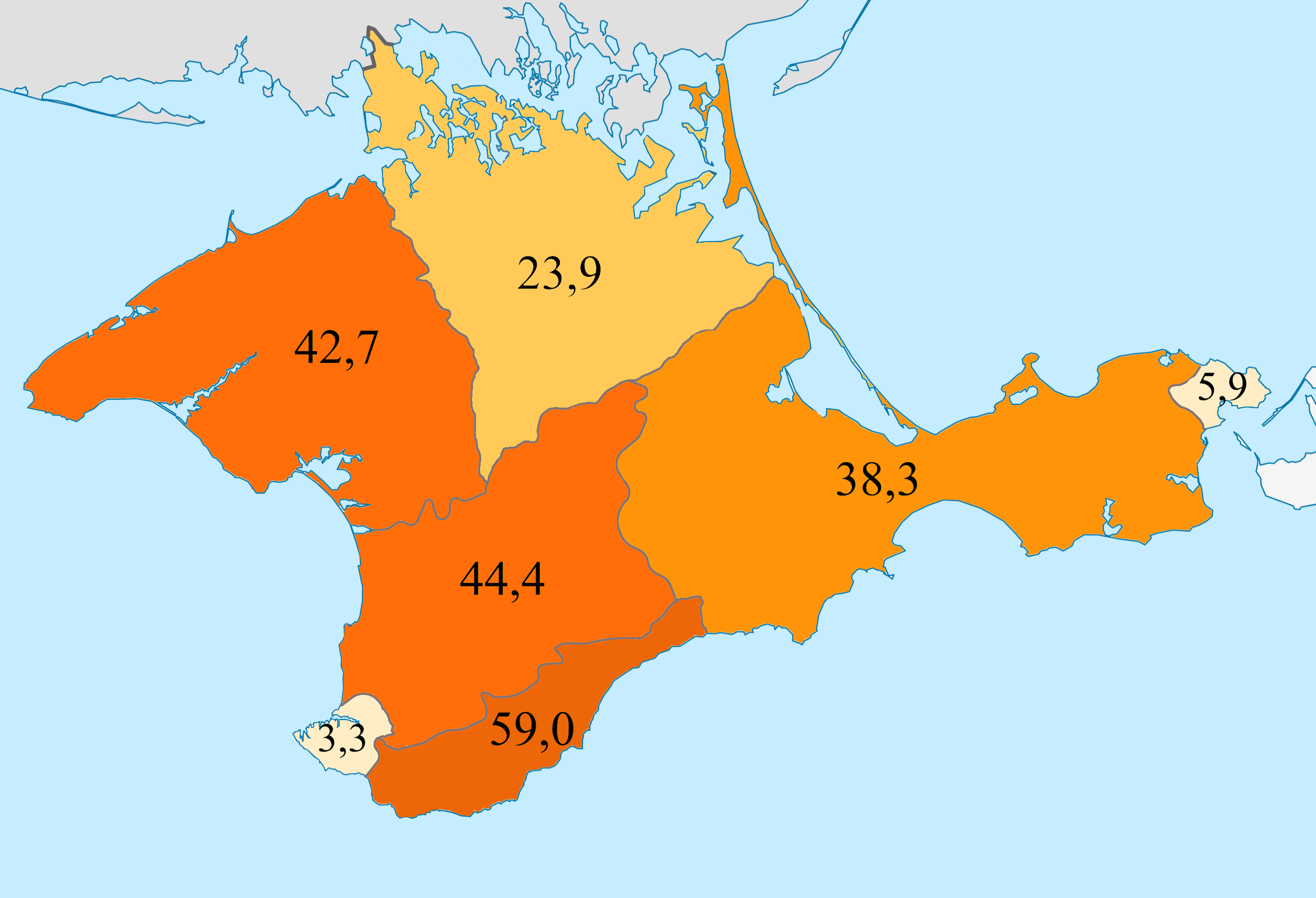
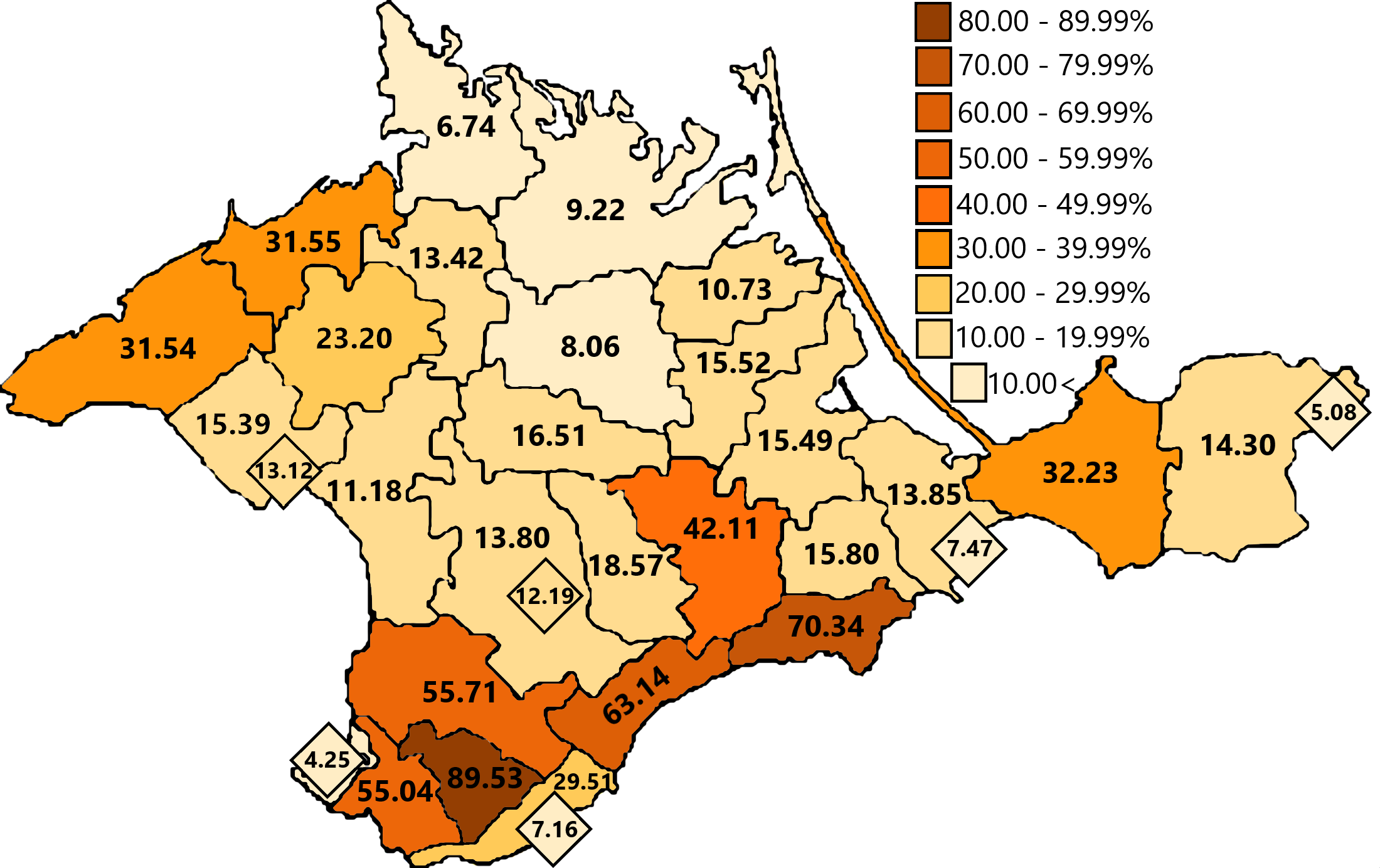
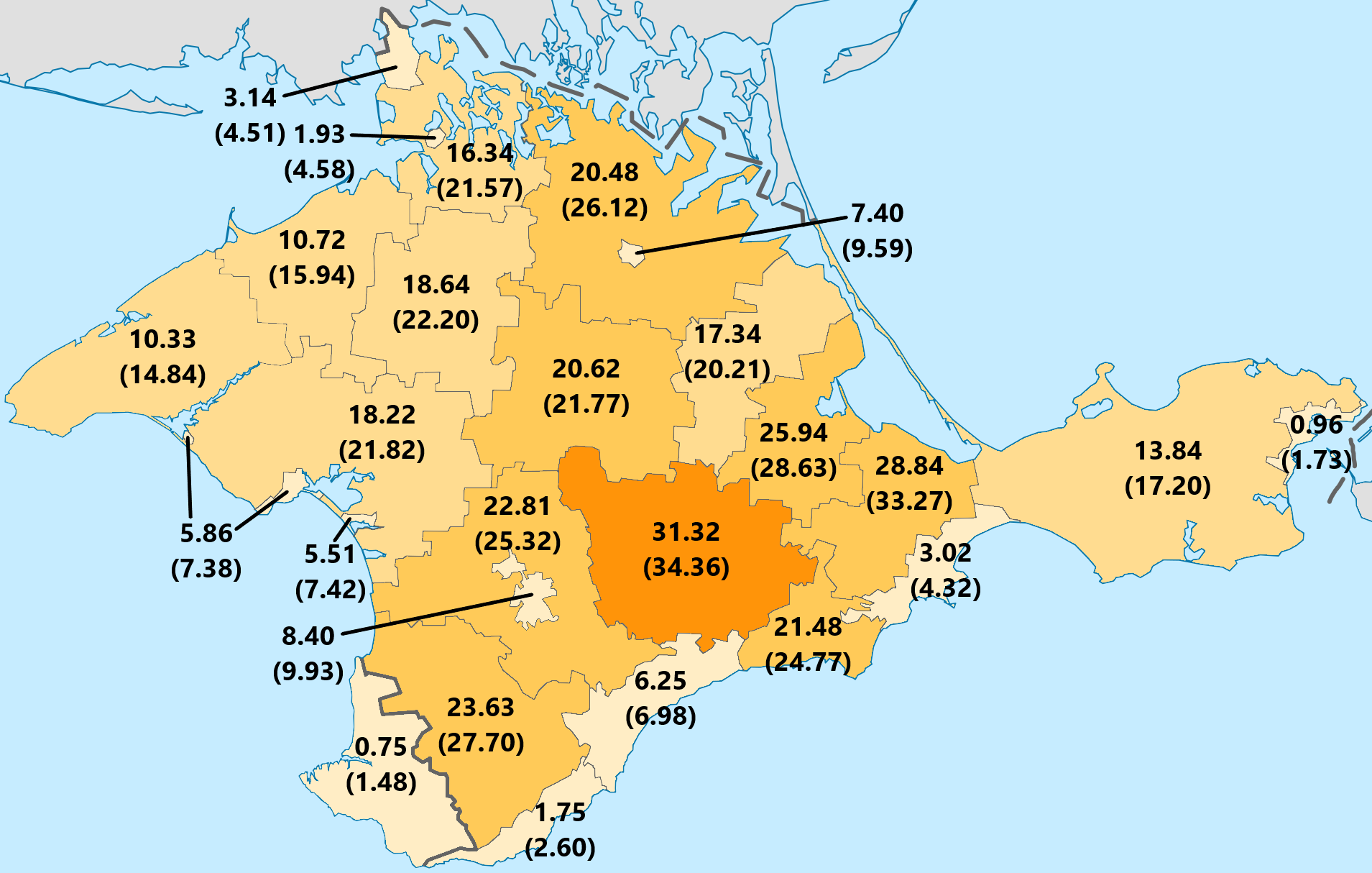
Ethnic maps of Crimea showing the percentage of Crimean Tatars in the peninsula by subdivision. The first map is based on data from the Russian Empire census (1897) − those who indicated Crimean Tatar as their native language, the second one is 1939 Soviet census before the deportation of Crimean Tatars in 1944, and the third from the 2014 Russian census.

The de-Tatarization of Crimea (Crimean Tatar: Qırımnıñ tatarsızlaştırıluvı; Russian: Детатаризация Крыма, romanized: Detatarizatsiya Kryma; Ukrainian: Детатаризація Криму, romanized: Detataryzatsiya Krymu) was initiated by the Russian Empire and perpetuated by the Soviet Union. Following the Russian Empire's annexation of the Crimean Khanate in 1783, a variety of legal and practical measures were implemented to subjugate the indigenous Crimean Tatars, who are a Turkic ethnic group. This process of "de-Tatarization" manifested in many ways throughout Crimea, intensifying significantly during the Soviet Union's Stalinist era: the Crimean Tatar language was suppressed and supplanted by the Russian language, especially by renaming Crimean toponyms; the government settled Russians and other Slavs in the region and promoted Tatarophobia amongst them, such as by describing Crimean Tatars as traitorous "Mongols" with no authentic connection to the peninsula; and, ultimately, as many as nearly half a million Crimean Tatars were deported in a campaign of ethnic cleansing and cultural genocide. During 1783–1917, nearly 4 million Muslims were forced to emigrate from Crimea, primarily to the Ottoman Empire. Prior to 1783, Crimean Tatars made up 95% of the Crimean population.

== Manifestations ==
=== Topography renaming ===
The vast majority of districts, raions, villages, and geographic features in Crimea bearing Crimean Tatar names were given Slavic and communist names shortly after the deportation of the Crimean Tatars by the Soviet regime, per a decree of the Crimean Regional Committee mandating such renaming. Most places in Crimea still bear the post-deportation names, many redundant, that were imposed in the 1940s to remove traces of Crimean Tatar existence. Very few localities – Bakhchysarai, Dzhankoy, İşün, Alushta, Alupka, and Saky – were given their original names back after the fall of the Soviet Union.

=== Amet-khan Airport ===
The attempts to paint Amet-khan Sultan as a Dagestani contrary to his Crimean origins has faced backlash from the Crimean Tatar community. Despite the flying ace being born in Crimea to a Crimean Tatar mother and always identifying himself as Crimean Tatar, the Russian Federation named a Dagestani airport after him while naming Crimea's main airport after Ivan Aivazovsky instead, ignoring numerous petitions from the Crimean Tatar community requesting that the airport bearing Amet-khan's name be in his homeland.

=== Propaganda ===
Soviet party officials in Crimea indoctrinated the Slavic population of Crimea with Tatarophobia, depicting Crimean Tatars as "traitors", "bourgeoisie", or "counter-revolutionaries", and falsely implying that they were "Mongols" with no historical connection to the Crimean peninsula (despite their Greek, Italian, Armenian, and Gothic roots). A 1948 conference in Crimea was dedicated to promoting and sharing anti-Crimean-Tatar sentiments.

=== Women's experiences ===
==== Deportation and Exile (After 1944) ====
During the 1944 deportation, women and children comprised over 80 percent of those forcibly expelled from Crimea. The NKVD transported entire families in overcrowded cattle cars with minimal access to food, water, or medical care, resulting in high mortality.

Crimean Tatar women had to carry economic, domestic, and cultural responsibilities. In the special‑settler regime in Central Asia, they were subject to forced labour assignment under “special‑settler” status, including agricultural work, often in extreme heat. Accounts indicate that women engaged in subsistence strategies, including selling personal belongings or bartering services to secure food. At the same time, mothers and grandmothers maintained cultural practices and religious observances to preserve traditions despite a lack of institutional support.

Women also participated in organized political resistance. Many female dissidents, such as Ayşe Seitmuratova, were imprisoned for criticizing Soviet policies.

==== Post-Annexation Period (2014 – Present) ====
Women's de-tatarization resistance activism manifests in several ways, from collective formations to support for spouses imprisoned by the Russian Federation.

Since the annexation of Crimea by the Russian Federation in 2014, Crimean Tatar activists face increased pressure, including legal persecution and surveillance. There are cases of women being illegally detained for several months in attempts to re-enter Crimea.

In October 2025, FSB officers conducted a series of illegal searches in the homes of four Crimean Tatar women in occupied Bakhchysarai, Kholmivka, Dolynne, and Orlivka and detained them on terrorism charges.

== See also ==
- Russian imperialism
  - Russification
- Population transfer in the Soviet Union
- Soviet war crimes
- Violence against indigenous women
