= Novosilske =

Novosilske (Ukrainian: Новосільське) may refer to the following places in Ukraine:

- Novosilske, Crimea, village in Chornomorske Raion
- Novosilske, Odesa Oblast, village in Reni Raion
- Novosilske, Sumy Oblast, village in Lebedyn Raion
- Novosilske, Zaporizhzhia Oblast, village in Berdiansk Raion
