= Chornomorske Raion =

Coordinates: 45°30′07″N 32°42′09″E

Chernomorsky Raion Aqmeçit rayonı
- Raion
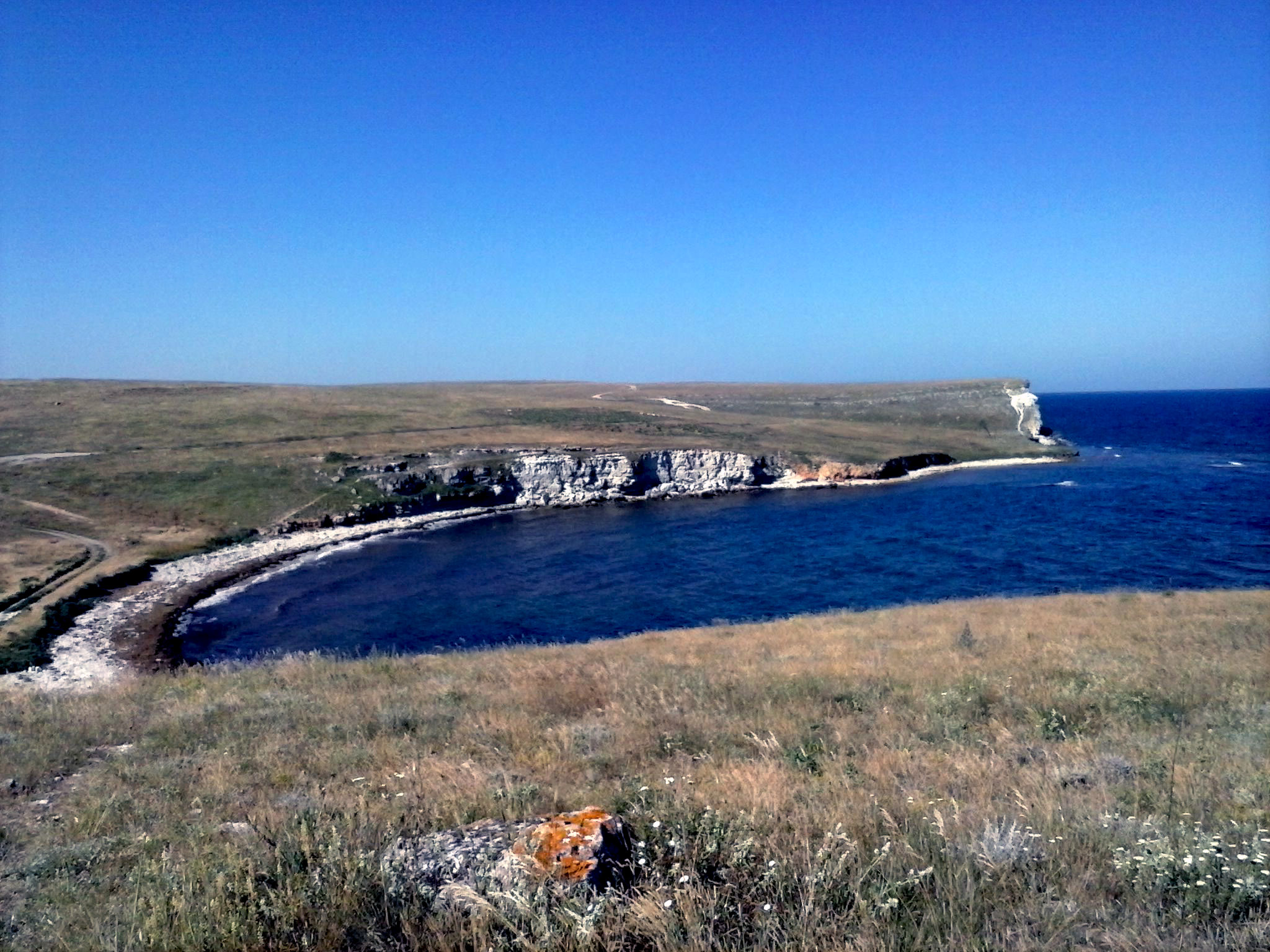
- Tarhunkut Cape, Chernomorsky District

- Flag Seal
- Location within Crimea
- Country: Ukraine (occupied by Russia)
- Republic: Crimea
- Capital: Chornomorske
- Subdivisions: List: 0 cities; 1 towns; 33 villages

Area
  - Total: 1,509 km^{2} (583 sq mi)

Population (2014)
  - Total: 30,500
  - Density: 20.2/km^{2} (52.3/sq mi)
- Time zone: UTC+3 (MSK)
- Dialing code: +380-6558
- Website: chero.rk.gov.ru

Chornomorske Raion (Ukrainian: Чорноморський район, Russian: Черноморский район, Crimean Tatar: Aqmeçit rayonı) is a raion (district) within boundaries of the Autonomous Republic of Crimea, which is the southernmost subdivision of Ukraine, but since 2014 occupied and administered by the Russian Federation. Population: 30,500 (2014 Census).

It is located in the far west of the republic on the Tarkhankut Peninsula. The raion's administrative centre is the town of Chornomorske.

== Settlements and Population ==
The raion contains the urban-type settlement of Chornomorske, 31 villages:

- Daleke
- Dozorne
- Hromove
- Kalynivka
- Khmelove
- Kop-Aran
- Krasna Poliana
- Krasnosilske
- Krasnoyarske
- Kuznetske
- Lenske
- Maiak
- Mariine
- Medvedeve
- Mizhvodne
- Novoivanivka
- Novosilske
- Okunivka
- Olenivka
- Severne
- Snizhne
- Tarkhankut
- Toka
- Vnukove
- Vodopiine
- Volodymyrivka
- Zadorne
- Zaitseve
- Zhuravlivka
- Znamianka
- Zoriane

And two rural-type settlements: Ozerivka and Nyzivka.

=== Demographics ===
As of the 2001 Ukrainian census, the district counted a population of 34,112 people. Ethnic Russians make up a narrow majority, while Ukrainians are the biggest minority, accounting for a little less than one third of the population. Other significant minorities are Crimean Tatars, Tatars, Belarusians and Black Sea Germans.

Ethnic groups in the Chornomorske district
	percent
Russians	52.8%
Ukrainians	29.3%
Crimean Tatars	12.7%
Belarusians	1.5%
Tatars	1.5%
Germans	0.5%
Armenians	0.2%
Uzbeks	0.2%
others	1.3%

== 2020 Ukrainian Administrative Reform ==
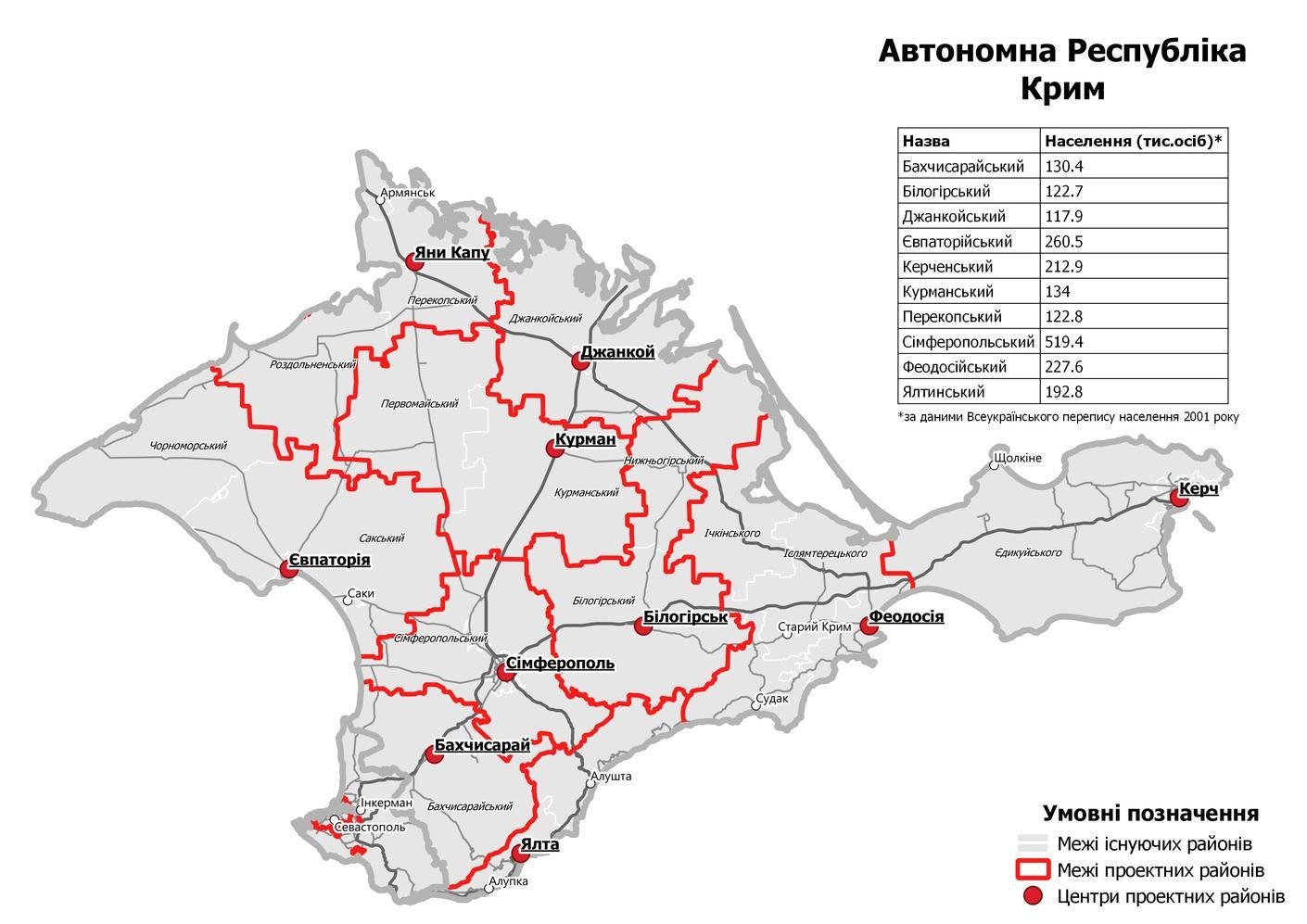
In July 2020, the Verkhovna Rada approved an administrative reform in Crimea

In July 2020, Ukraine conducted an administrative reform throughout its de jure territory. This included Crimea, which was at the time occupied by Russia, and is still ongoing as of October 2023. Crimea was reorganized from 14 raions and 11 municipalities into 10 raions, with municipalities abolished altogether. Chornomorske Raion was abolished, and its territories to become a part of Yevpatoria Raion, but this has not yet been implemented due to the ongoing Russian occupation.
