= Kalos Limen =

Ancient Greek colony on the east coast of the Crimean Peninsula

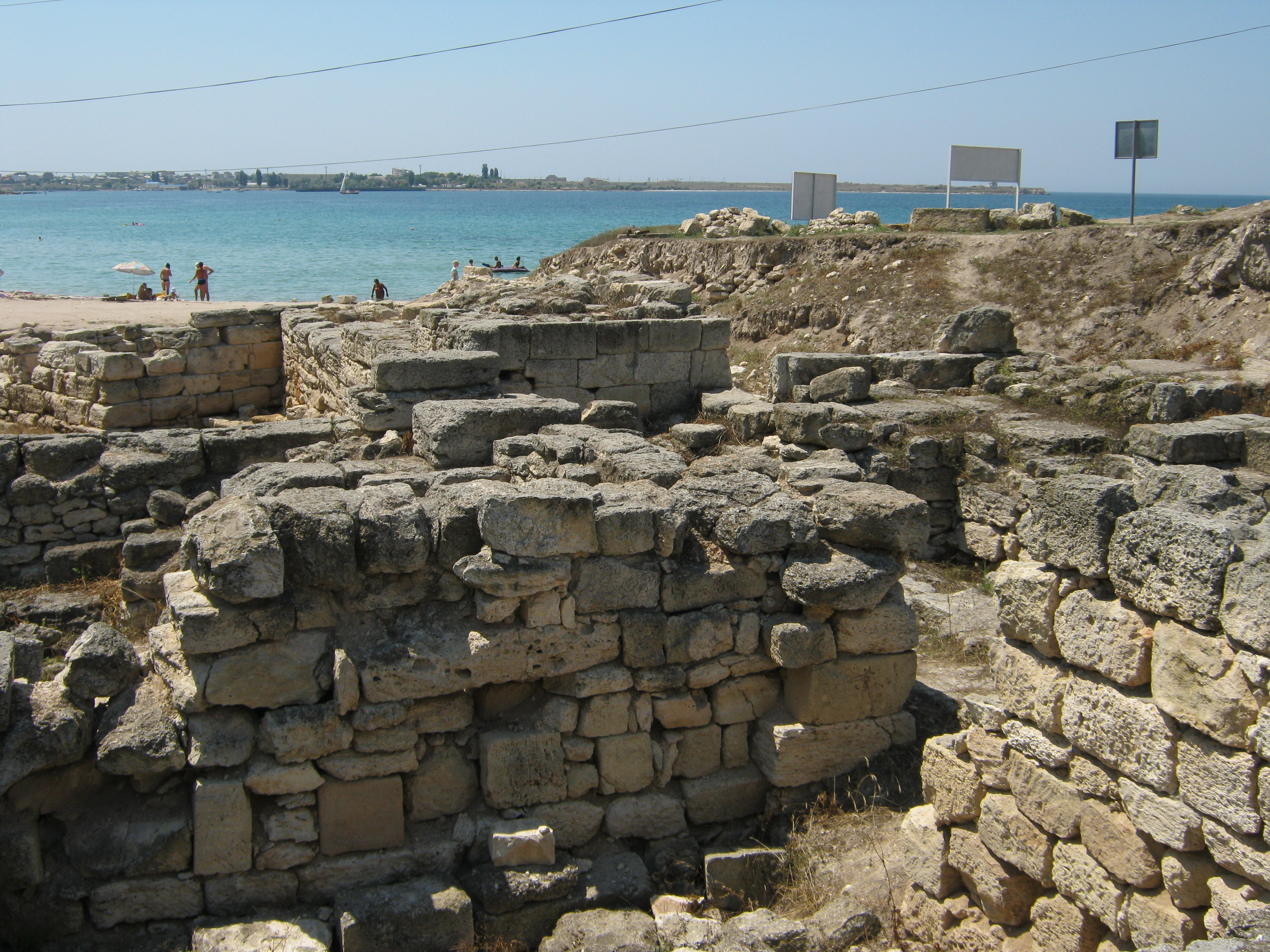
- Ruins of Kalos Limen
- Interactive map of Kalos Limen
- 45°31′03″N 32°42′49″E
- Periods: Classical Greece
- Location: Chornomorske
- Region: Taurica

History
- Built: 4th century BC
- Abandoned: 1st century BC

Site notes
- Owner: State Historic-Archaeological Reserve "Kalos-Limen"

Kalos Limen (Ancient Greek: Καλός Λιμήν, lit. 'Charming Harbor'; Ukrainian: Калос-Лімен; Russian: Калос Лимен) is an ancient Greek colony on the west coast of the Crimean Peninsula that existed from 4th to 1st centuries BC.

== History ==
The settlement is mentioned in the anonymous Periplus of the Euxine Sea as being located 700 stadions from Kerkinitis (modern-day Yevpatoria). Based on the descriptions from the periplus, it was concluded that Kalos Limen was located on the coast of Tarkhankut Peninsula.

Kalos Limen was established by Ionian settlers in 4th century BC. The city was 4 ha in size and was surrounded by walls. Kalos Limen was divided into sections, and a tower was located in the center of each. By the end of 4th century BC, the city belonged to Chersonesus. Fortifications of the city were strengthened in 3rd century BC due to Scythian and Sarmatian raids. In 2nd century BC, Kalos Limen was captured by Scythians, but it was soon recaptured by Greeks, to be recaptured by Scythians again. In 1st century BC, the city was abandoned completely due to a Sarmatian invasion.

On 22 April 1997, the State Historic-Archaeological Reserve "Kalos-Limen" was created.

== Gallery ==
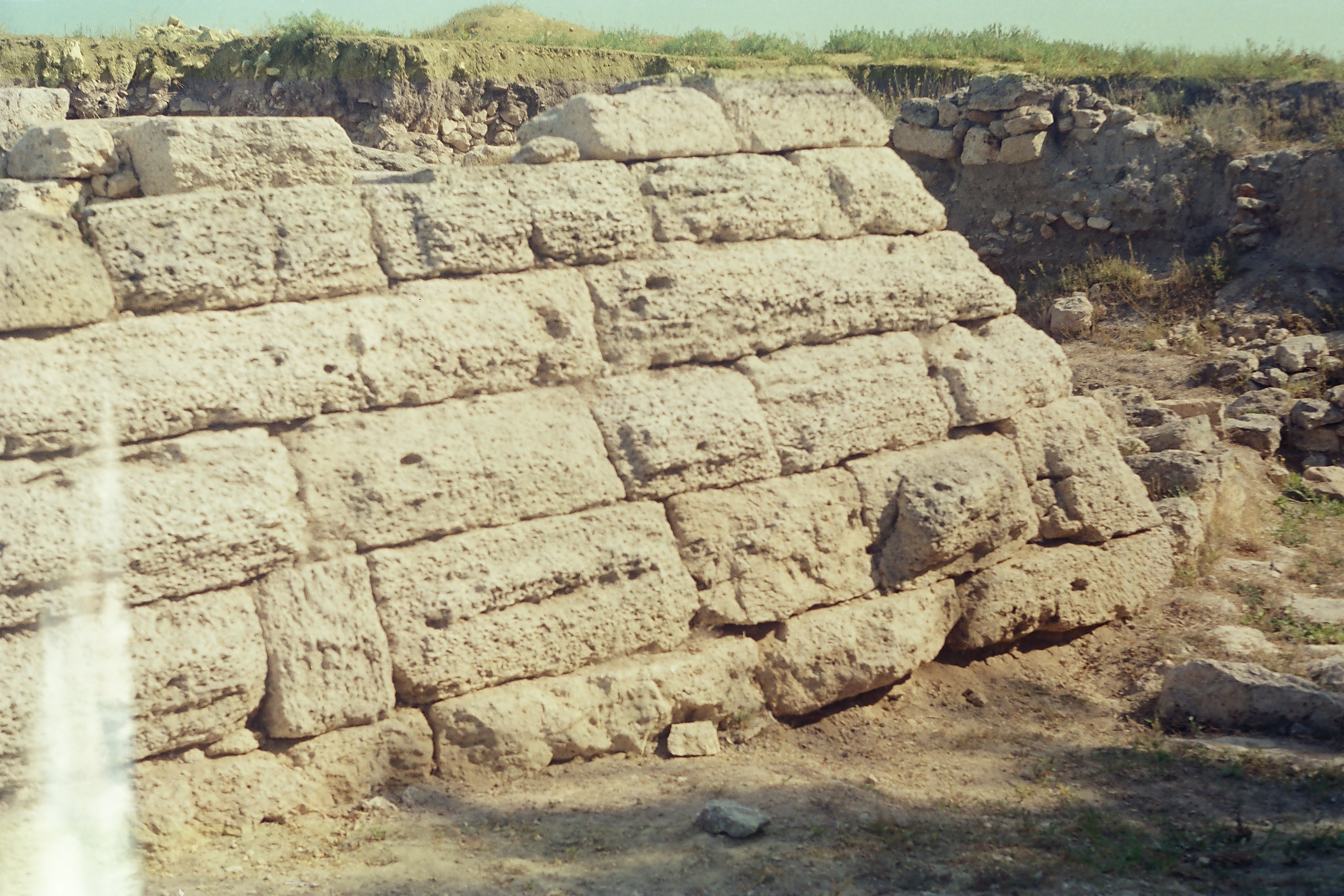
Fortification walls

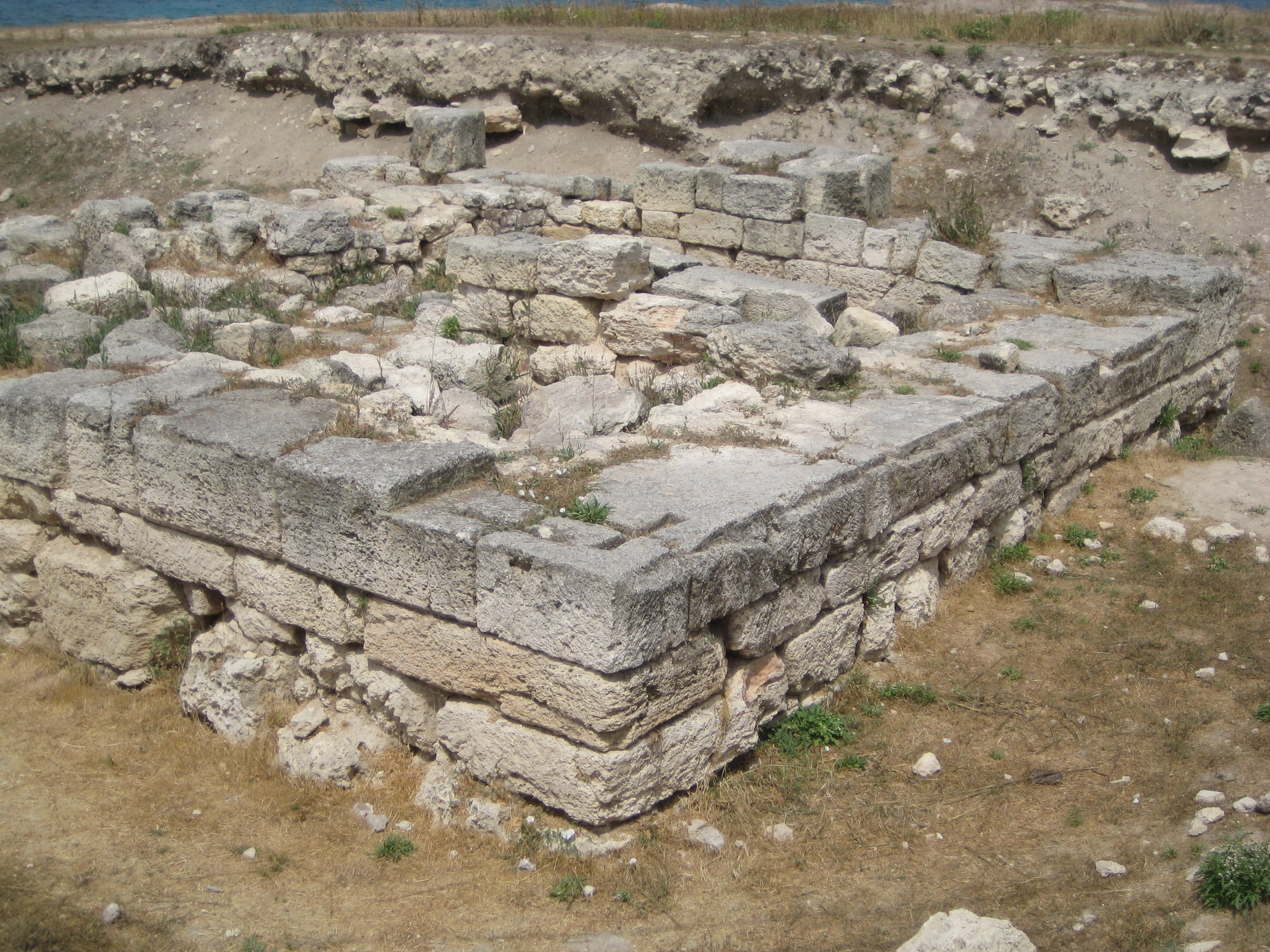

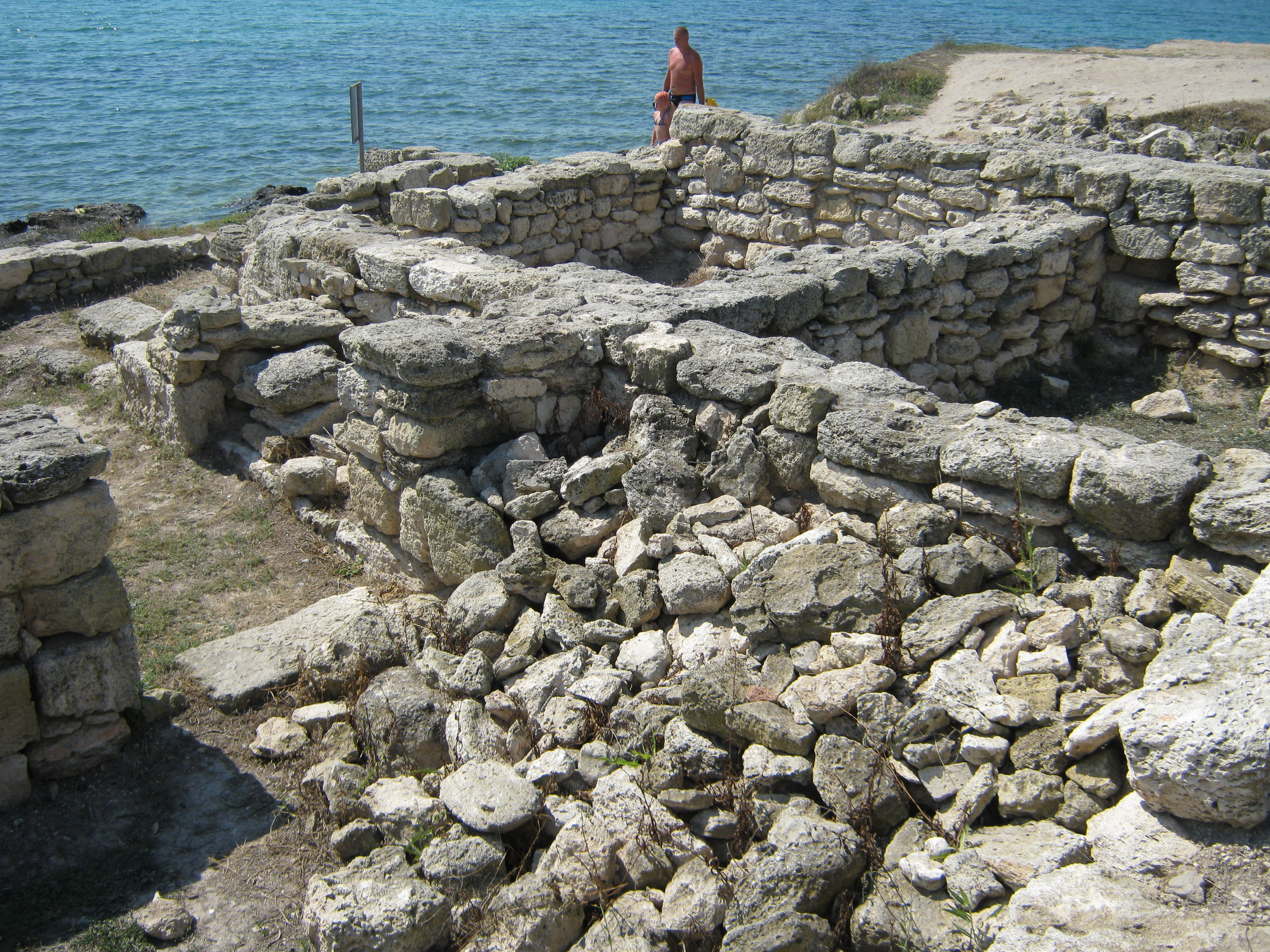

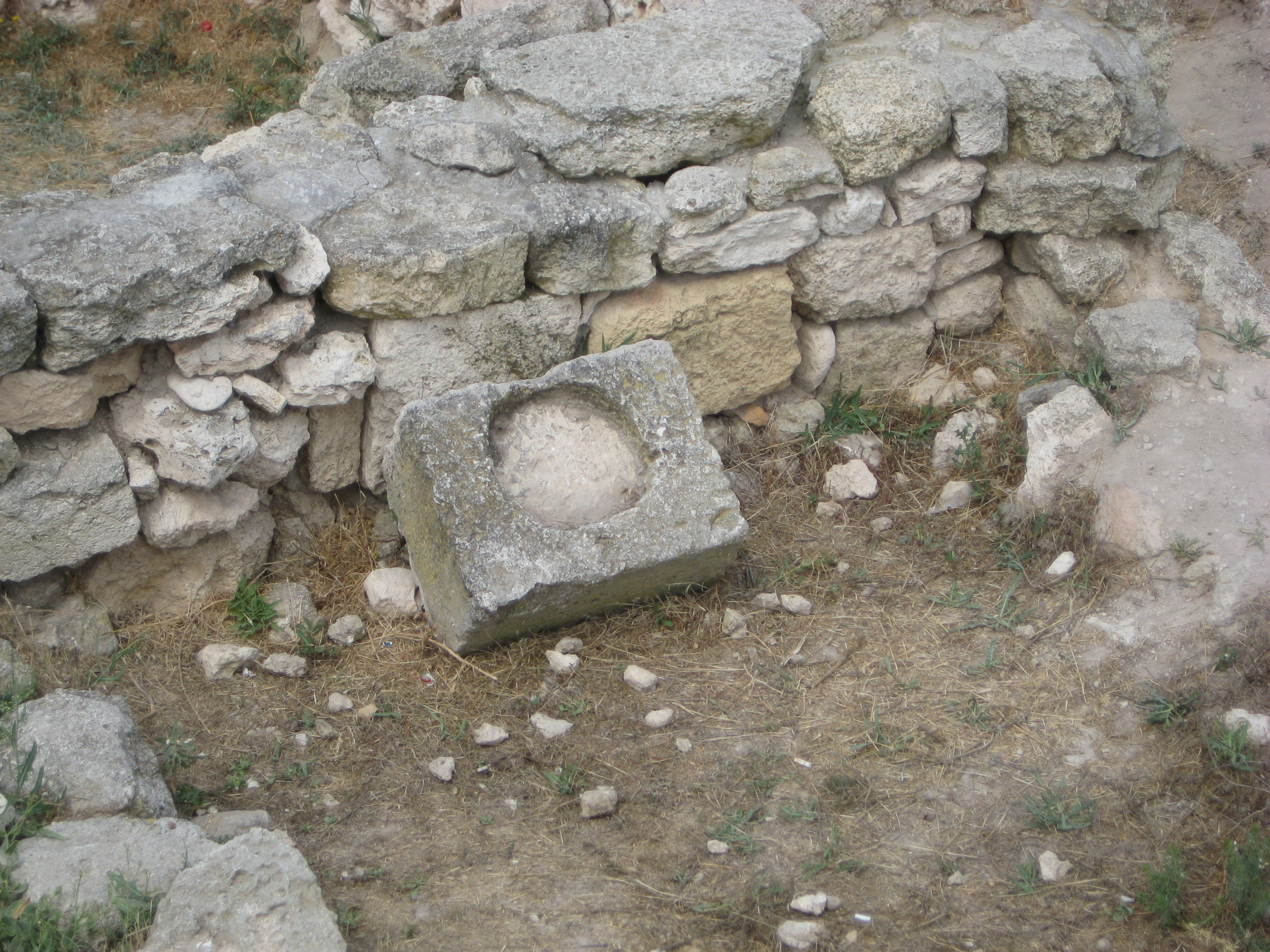

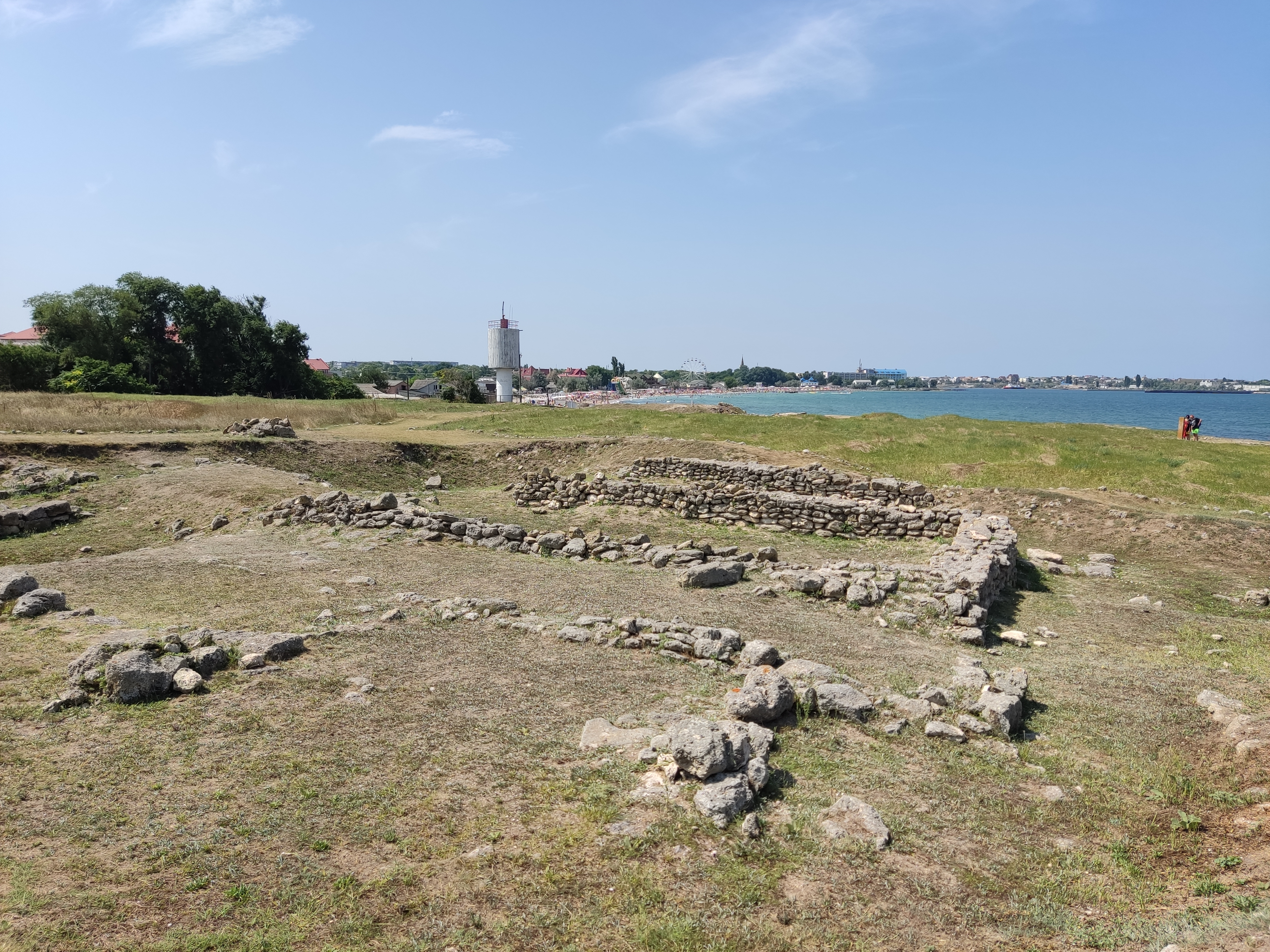

== See also ==
- Chersonesus
- Pantikapaion
