= Novosilske, Crimea =

Village in Chornomorske Raion, Crimea

Novosilske
- Village
- Interactive map of Novosilske
- Location within Crimea
- Coordinates: 45°30′05″N 32°43′40″E
- Country: Disputed: Ukraine (de jure); Russia (de facto)
- Region: (Autonomous Republic of Crimea) Crimea^{1}
- Municipality: Chornomorske
- Elevation: 15 m (49 ft)

Population (2014)
  - Total: 2,424
- Time zone: UTC+4 (MSK)
- ^{1} Autonomous Republic of Crimea (de jure) or Republic of Crimea (de facto), depending on jurisdiction.

Novosilske (Russian: Новосільське; Ukrainian: Новосільське; Crimean Tatar: Novoselskoye) is a village located in Chornomorske Raion, Crimea. Population: 2,424 (2014 Census).

== See also ==
- Chornomorske Raion
