= Olenivka, Chornomorske Raion =

Village in Crimea

Olenivka Оленівка
- Village
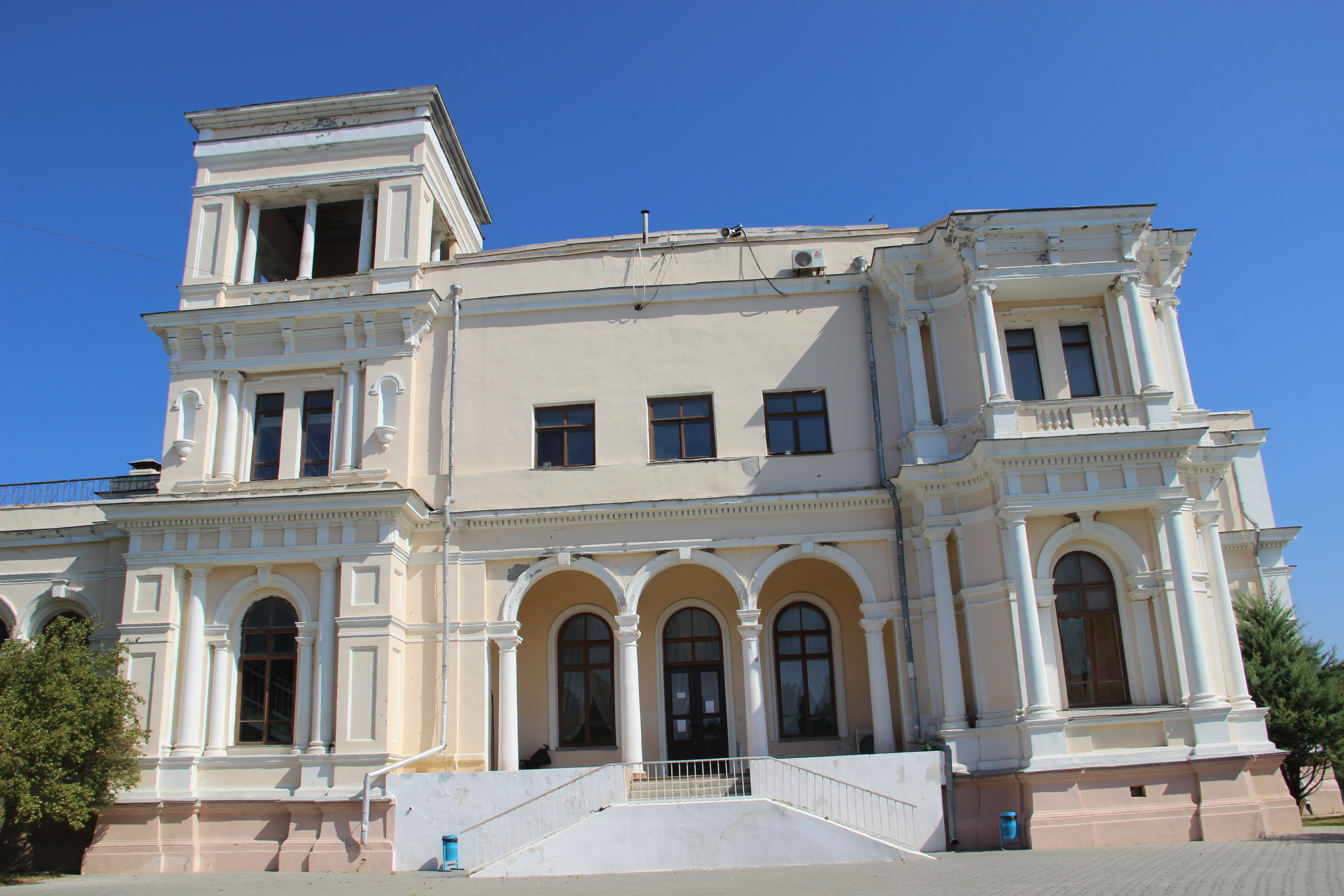

- Flag Coat of arms

- Interactive map of Olenivka
- Location of Olenivka in Crimea Olenivka (Crimea)
- Coordinates: 45.378333°N 32.534167°E
- Country (de jure)^{1}: Ukraine
- Region: Autonomous Republic of Crimea
- Raion: Chornomorske Raion

Population (2001 census)
  - Total: 1,528
- Time zone: UTC+2 (EET)
  - Summer (DST): UTC+3 (EEST)
- Postal code: 96440
- Area code: +380 6558

Olenivka (Ukrainian: Оленівка; Russian: Оленевка, Crimean Tatar: Qara Acı) is a village in Chornomorske Raion (district) in the Autonomous Republic of Crimea, on the Tarkhankut Peninsula, on the western coast of Crimea.

== Demographics ==
As of the 2001 Ukrainian census, Olenivka had a population of 1,526 inhabitants. Thelinguistic composition of the settlement was as follows:

First languages in Olenivka
	percent
Russian	79.4%
Ukrainian	19.5%
Armenian	0.6%
Crimean Tatar	0.5%
others	0.1%
