= Violence against indigenous women =

Violence against indigenous women often has higher rates than violence against non‐indigenous women.

Many indigenous communities are rural, with few resources and little help from the government or non-state actors. These groups also often have strained relationships with law enforcement, making prosecution difficult. Many indigenous societies also find themselves at the centre of land disputes between nations and ethnic groups, often resulting in these communities bearing the brunt of national and ethnic conflicts.

== By region ==
=== Central America ===
Guatemalan indigenous women have also faced extensive violence. Throughout over three decades of conflict, Maya women and girls have continued to be targeted. The Commission for Historical Clarification found that 88% of women affected by state-sponsored rape and sexual violence against women were indigenous.

=== North America ===
The concept of white dominion over indigenous women's bodies has been rooted in American history since the beginning of colonisation. The theory of manifest destiny went beyond simple land extension and into the belief that European settlers had the right to exploit Native women's bodies as a method of taming and "humanizing" them.

Canada has an extensive problem with violence against indigenous women, by both indigenous men and non-aboriginals. "[I]t has been consistently found that Aboriginal women have a higher likelihood of being victimised compared to the rest of the female population." While Canadian national averages of violence against women are falling, they have remained the same for aboriginal communities throughout the years. The history of residential schools and economic inequality of indigenous Canadians has resulted in communities facing violence, unemployment, drug use, alcoholism, political corruption, and high rates of suicide. In addition, there has been clear and admitted racism towards indigenous people by the Royal Canadian Mounted Police, making victims less likely to report cases of domestic violence.

Many of the issues facing indigenous women in Canada have been addressed via the Murdered and Missing Indigenous Women (MMIW) initiatives. Thousands of Native Canadian women have gone missing or been killed in the past 30 years, with little representation or attention from the government. Efforts to make the Canadian public aware of these women's disappearances have mostly been led by Aboriginal communities, who often reached across provinces to support one another. In 2015, prime minister Stephen Harper commented that the issue of murdered and missing indigenous women was "not high on our radar", prompting outrage in already frustrated indigenous communities. A few months later, Prime Minister Justin Trudeau launched an official inquiry into the Murdered and Missing Indigenous Women.

In the United States, Native American women are more than twice as likely to experience violence than any other demographic. One in three Native women is sexually assaulted during her life, and 67% of these assaults are perpetrated by non-Natives, with Native Americans constituting 0.7% of U.S. population in 2015. The disproportionate rate of assault to indigenous women is due to a variety of causes, including but not limited to the historical legal inability of tribes to prosecute on their own on the reservation. The federal Violence Against Women Act was reauthorised in 2013, which for the first time gave tribes jurisdiction to investigate and prosecute felony domestic violence offenses involving Native American and non-Native offenders on the reservation, as 26% of Natives live on reservations. In 2019 the Democrat House passed H.R. 1585 (Violence Against Women Reauthorization Act of 2019) by a vote of 263–158, which increases tribes' prosecution rights much further. However, in the Republican Senate its progress has stalled.

=== South America ===
Violence against indigenous women is often perpetrated by the state, such as in Peru, in the 1990s. President Alberto Fujimori (in office from 1990 to 2000) has been accused of genocide and crimes against humanity as a result of a forced sterilisation program put in place by his administration. During his presidency, Fujimori put in place a program of forced sterilizations against indigenous people (mainly the Quechuas and the Aymaras), in the name of a "public health plan", presented 28 July 1995.

Bolivia has the highest rate of domestic violence in Latin America. Indigenous women self-report physical or sexual violence from a current or former partner at rates of twenty-nine percent, in comparison to the national average of twenty four percent. Bolivia is largely indigenous in its ethnic demographics, and Quechua, Aymara, and Guarani women have been monumental in the nation's fight against violence against women.

=== Oceania ===
In New Zealand, Māori women are two times more likely to experience violence than other women.
