= Krasna Poliana, Chornomorske Raion, Crimea =

Coordinates: 45°28′54″N 32°56′16″E

Krasna Poliana Красна Поляна
- Village
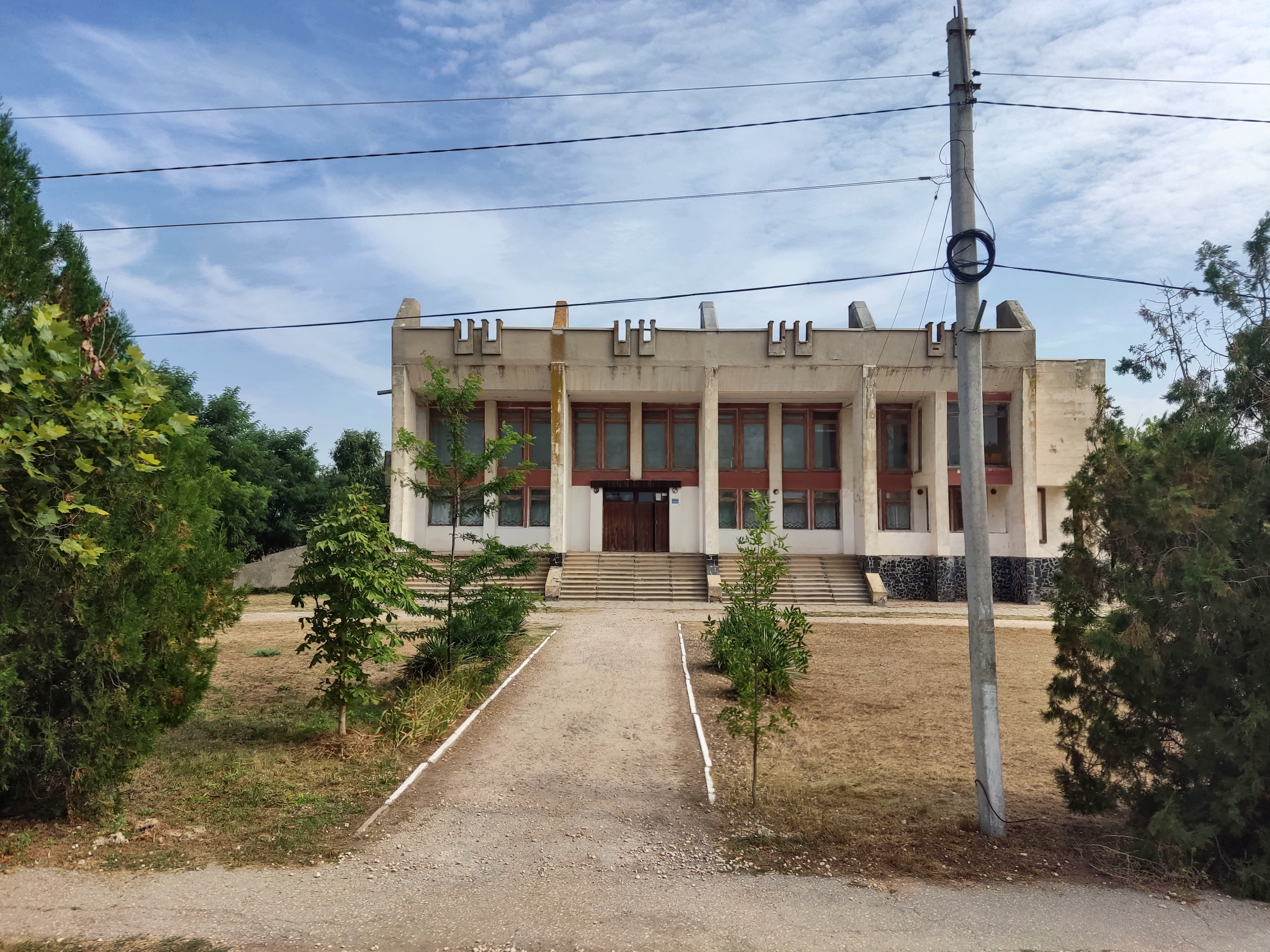

- Location within Crimea
- Country: Disputed; Russia, Ukraine
- Republic: Crimea
- Raion: Chornomorske

Krasna Poliana (Ukrainian: Кра́сна Поля́на; Russian: Красная Поляна), historically known as Kyzyl-Chonrav (Crimean Tatar: Qızıl Çoñrav; Ukrainian: Кизил-Чонрав; Russian: Кызыл-Чонрав) is a village in Chornomorske Raion, Crimea.

== History ==
After the end of World War II, the Crimean peninsula was subjected to a campaign of ethnic cleansing by the Soviet Union, in which the Indigenous Crimean Tatar people of Crimea were deported. Crimea was incorporated as the Crimean Oblast into the Russian SFSR. The village, previously known by its native Crimean Tatar name Kyzyl-Chonrav, was given its current name by the Russian SFSR on 18 May 1948 as part of a large-scale renaming campaign that removed the native names of Crimean settlements and replaced them with Slavic ones.
