= Chornomorske =

Chornomorske Чорноморське/Черноморское/Aqmeçit
- Urban-type settlement
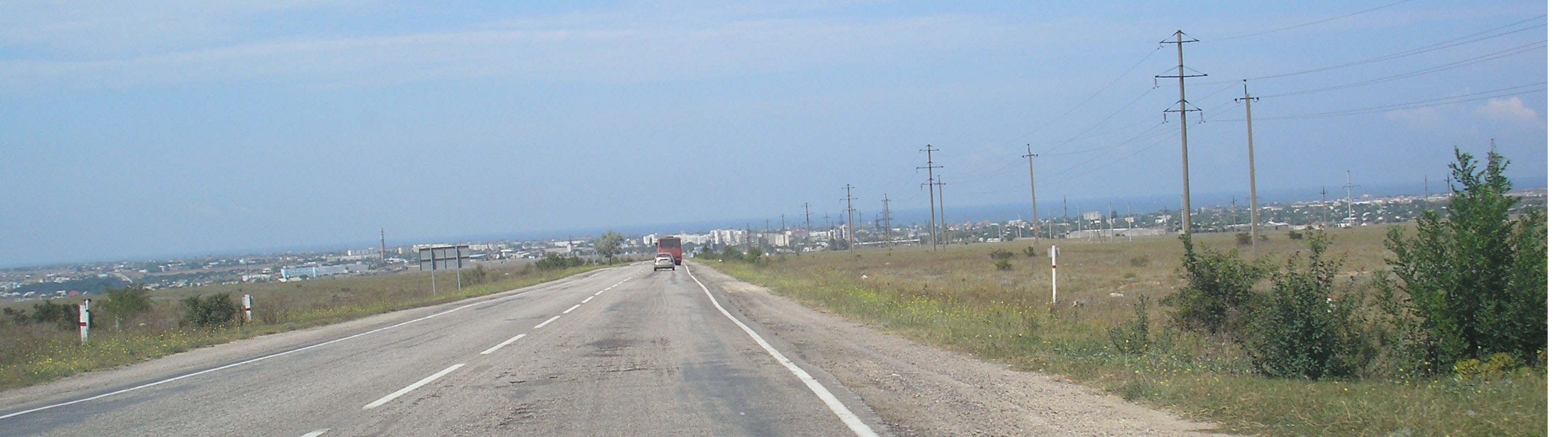
- View of Chornomorske

- Flag Coat of arms

- Location of Chornomorske in Crimea Chornomorske (Crimea)
- Coordinates: 45°30′07″N 32°42′09″E
- Republic: Crimea
- Raion: Chornomorske Raion
- Urban-type settlement status: 1957

Government
  - Head: Serhiy Kryvobokov

Area
  - Total: 119 km^{2} (46 sq mi)
- Elevation: 20 m (66 ft)

Population (2014)
  - Total: 11,267
  - Density: 94.7/km^{2} (245/sq mi)
- Time zone: MSK
- Postal code: 96400 (Ukraine); 296400, 296406, 296407 (Russia)
- Area code: +380 6558 (Ukraine)

Chornomorske or Chernomorskoye (Ukrainian: Чорноморське; Russian: Черноморское; Crimean Tatar: Aqmeçit) is an urban-type settlement and the administrative center of Chornomorske Raion in Crimea, a territory recognized by a majority of countries as part of Ukraine (the Autonomous Republic of Crimea) and occupied by Russia as the Republic of Crimea. It is located on the northern edge of the Tarkhankut Peninsula. Population: 11,267 (2014 Census); 11,643 (2001 Census).

== History ==
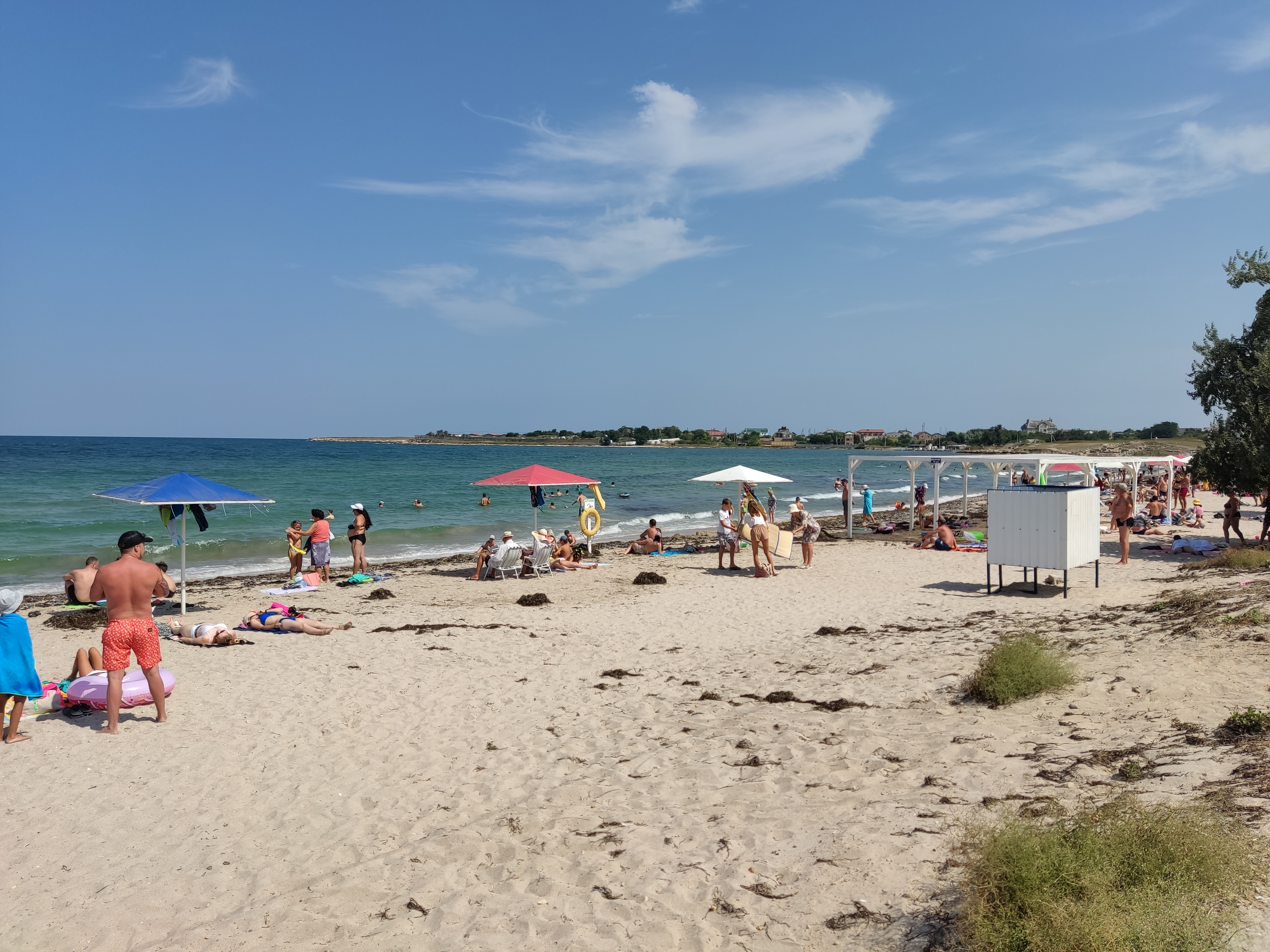
Beach of Chornomorske.

The first inhabitants on the shore of the current narrow bay were the Greeks as part of the Greek colonization of the Black Sea. The city of Kalos Limen (Καλός Λιμήν – Lovely Harbor) was founded on this site by Chersonesus in the second half of the 4th century BC. It was one of the important centers of agriculture and trade, among both Greek and Scythian centers. By the middle of the 2nd century BC in the Greco-Scythian war, the town had been captured to the Scythians. Although liberated by Pontic intervention by the end of the 2nd century, it again fell under Scythian control by the mid-1st century BC to the early 2nd century AD. Scythian control ended permanently thereafter, possibly owing to Roman intervention.

In Russian, the settlement was originally known as Ak-Mechet (Ак-Мечеть), from the Crimean Tatar "Aqmeçit", which literally means a white mosque. A mosque with a tall white minaret used to exist here. After the Crimean Tatars were forcibly deported in 1944, the settlement was given its present name, which alludes to the settlement's coastal location on the Black Sea.

== Economy ==
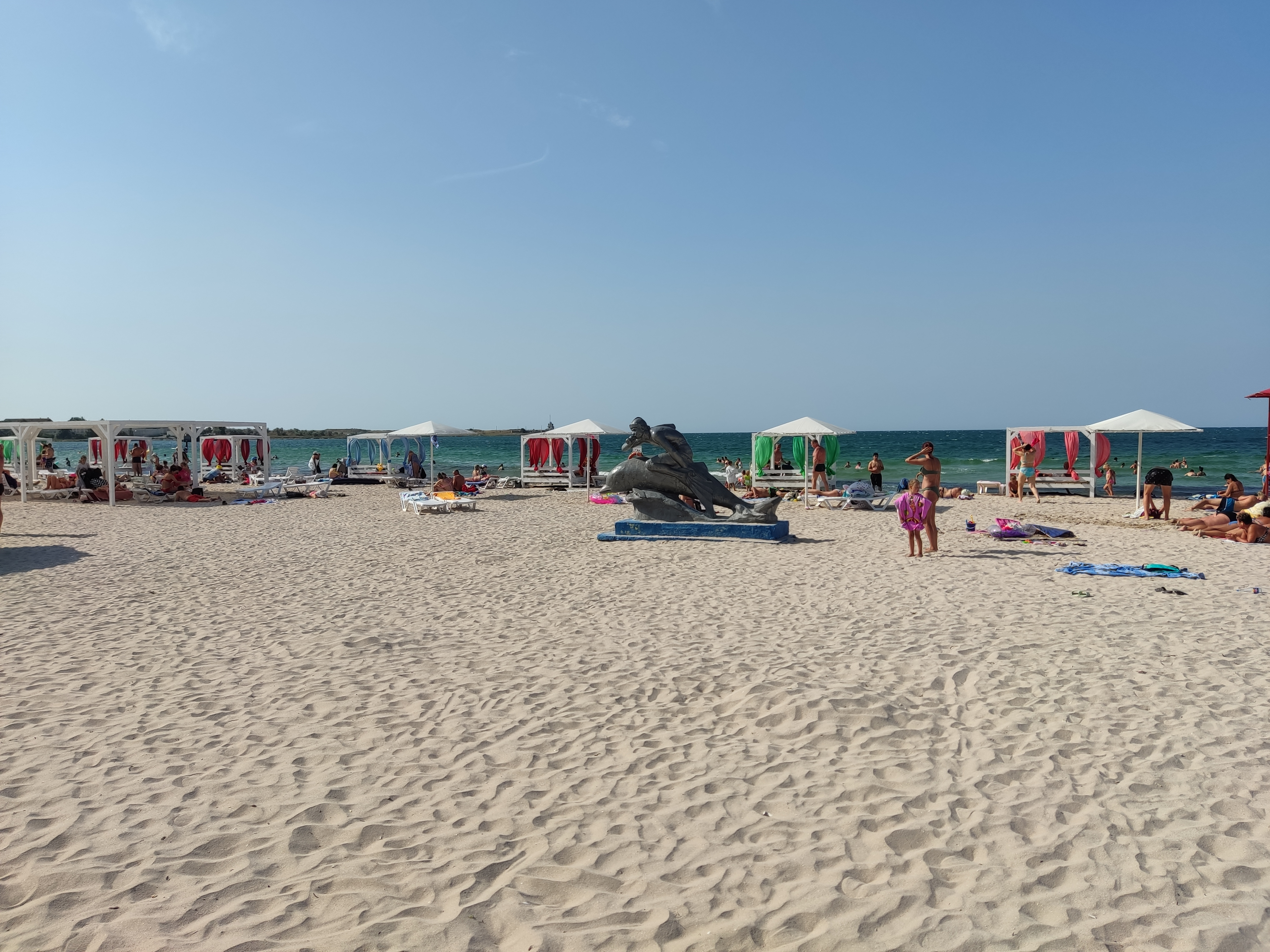
Beach in 2021.

Chornomorske is a peninsula offshore drilling center and base port, and where the company Chornomornaftogaz derives its name.

== Climate ==
Chornomorske has a cool semi-arid climate (Köppen BSk) with very warm summers and cold, though not severe, winters. Precipitation is low, and heaviest in the autumn months when cyclonic lows may produce significant falls.

Climate data for Chornomorske (1991–2020, extremes 1955–present)
Month	Jan	Feb	Mar	Apr	May	Jun	Jul	Aug	Sep	Oct	Nov	Dec	Year
Record high °C (°F)	18.7 (65.7)	21.1 (70.0)	23.6 (74.5)	27.4 (81.3)	32.9 (91.2)	36.5 (97.7)	39.4 (102.9)	41.2 (106.2)	32.9 (91.2)	31.7 (89.1)	25.0 (77.0)	19.4 (66.9)	41.2 (106.2)
Mean daily maximum °C (°F)	4.2 (39.6)	5.0 (41.0)	8.5 (47.3)	14.2 (57.6)	19.9 (67.8)	24.7 (76.5)	27.5 (81.5)	27.6 (81.7)	22.6 (72.7)	16.7 (62.1)	10.8 (51.4)	6.3 (43.3)	15.7 (60.3)
Daily mean °C (°F)	1.3 (34.3)	1.7 (35.1)	4.9 (40.8)	9.8 (49.6)	15.5 (59.9)	20.7 (69.3)	23.4 (74.1)	23.3 (73.9)	18.4 (65.1)	12.7 (54.9)	7.3 (45.1)	3.6 (38.5)	11.9 (53.4)
Mean daily minimum °C (°F)	−1.3 (29.7)	−1.2 (29.8)	1.9 (35.4)	6.0 (42.8)	11.4 (52.5)	16.7 (62.1)	19.2 (66.6)	18.8 (65.8)	14.1 (57.4)	8.9 (48.0)	4.3 (39.7)	0.9 (33.6)	8.3 (46.9)
Record low °C (°F)	−22.0 (−7.6)	−22.7 (−8.9)	−14.7 (5.5)	−7.1 (19.2)	−0.5 (31.1)	7.5 (45.5)	10.4 (50.7)	7.2 (45.0)	0.0 (32.0)	−5.0 (23.0)	−13.0 (8.6)	−17.8 (0.0)	−22.7 (−8.9)
Average precipitation mm (inches)	29 (1.1)	24 (0.9)	26 (1.0)	28 (1.1)	33 (1.3)	34 (1.3)	23 (0.9)	25 (1.0)	41 (1.6)	70 (2.8)	34 (1.3)	31 (1.2)	398 (15.7)
Average extreme snow depth cm (inches)	0 (0)	1 (0.4)	0 (0)	0 (0)	0 (0)	0 (0)	0 (0)	0 (0)	0 (0)	0 (0)	0 (0)	0 (0)	1 (0.4)
Average rainy days	9	8	8	8	8	7	5	5	8	8	10	9	93
Average snowy days	7	7	3	0.3	0	0	0	0	0	0.2	2	5	25
Average relative humidity (%)	83.8	82.5	80.6	78.1	76.8	75.0	72.4	71.4	73.1	77.6	81.5	83.2	78.0
Source 1: Pogoda.ru
Source 2: World Meteorological Organization (humidity 1981–2010)
