= Armenians in Crimea =

Ethnic group in the Crimean Peninsula

Total population
- 10,000 (8,700 in the ARC and 1,300 in Sevastopol) — 20,000 (estimates)

Regions with significant populations
- Sevastopol, Feodosia, Armyansk, Simferopol, Evpatoria, Kerch, Yalta, Sevastopol, Sudak

Languages
- Armenian, Russian, Ukrainian, formerly Armeno-Kipchak

Religion
- Armenian Apostolic, Armenian Catholicism, Evangelicalism and Protestantism

Related ethnic groups
- Other Armenians (especially Don Armenians), Hamshenis, Cherkesogai, Lom, Crimean Tatars, Crimean Karaites, Krymchaks, Crimean Urums, Crimean Roma

The Armenians in Crimea have maintained a presence in the region since the Middle Ages. The first wave of Armenian immigration into this area began during the mid-eleventh century and, over time, as political, economic and social conditions in Armenia proper failed to improve, newer waves followed them. Today, between 10 and 20 thousand Armenians live in the peninsula.

== History ==
=== Early communities ===
In an ethnic and national sense, the Crimea has been a host to wide group of peoples. Historians and other scholars have dated the Armenian presence in the Crimea to the eighth century and have distinguished three distinctive stages of their settlement in the region. The Crimea was under the control of the Byzantine Empire during this time and some Armenian troops serving in the Byzantine military were stationed here. In the course of the next two centuries, Armenians from their homeland in the Armenian Highlands and other Byzantine cities came to settle here as well.

As life grew more unbearable in Armenia proper following the destructive Seljuk raids of the eleventh and twelfth centuries, many Armenians were forced to migrate to Byzantium and elsewhere and with some of them eventually settling in the Crimea. They founded new homes in Kaffa (modern Feodosia), Solhat, Karasubazar (Belogorsk), and Orabazar (Armyansk), with Kaffa at its center. The stability of the region allowed many of them to engage in agriculture and commercial activity. Even when the region came under Mongol control in the mid-thirteenth century, their economic life was left largely undisturbed. The Armenians' ties to commercial interests also greatly benefited the Genoese when they secured their economic domination there in the late thirteenth century. The widening economic opportunities in the Crimea attracted more Armenians to settle there. According to Genoese sources, in 1316 Armenians had three churches (two Armenian Apostolic and one Catholic) of their own in Kaffa.

As the foreign wars in Armenia continued unabated, greater numbers of Armenians chose to settle in the Crimea, to the degree that some Western sources began to refer to the region as Armenia Maritima and the Sea of Azov as Lacus armeniacus. A rich literary tradition and the art of illuminated manuscript writing were created. The Armenian Church played a central role in Armenian social life, and in 1330 it counted 44 churches under its jurisdiction. From the fourteenth to eighteenth centuries, the Armenians formed the second largest ethnic group after the Tatars. Many of them began to speak Tatar as their home language, writing it in Armenian script.

The flourishing of the community came to an abrupt end, however, when the Ottoman Turks took the region in 1475. Many Armenians were killed, enslaved, or fled the peninsula and as many as sixteen Armenian churches were converted to mosques, as the Armenians were subordinated to the rule of the Crimean khanate, which remained an ally of the Ottoman Empire. Despite this, there remained in the sixteenth century Armenian communities Kaffa, Karasubazar, Balaklava, Gezlev, Perekop and Surkhat. From 1778-1779, more than 22,000 Armenians resettled in Azov province and on the coast of the Dnieper and Samara, leading to gradual economic decline, in what was known as the Emigration of Christians from Crimea. In 1783, the Russian Empire conquered the Crimean khanate. Russian authorities encouraged the settlement of foreign colonists, including Armenians, into the Crimea. This led to a fresh wave of Armenian immigrants, reviving former colonies. In 1913, their numbers hovered around 9,000 and approximately 14,000-15,000 in 1914. The resettlement of Armenians on the peninsula lasted until the First World War and the Armenian genocide in the Ottoman Empire in 1915-1923. The immigrants of the nineteenth and twentieth centuries were largely from Western Armenia and the various regions of Ottoman Empire.

=== Soviet era ===
In 1919, there were 16,907 Armenians living in the Crimea. In 1930, in the newly established Crimean Autonomous Soviet Socialist Republic, there were two Armenian national districts, and on the peninsula there were approximately 13,000 Armenians. According to the All-Union census of 1989, the number of Armenians living in the Crimea had dwindled down to 2,794. On May 29, 1944, Commissar of Internal Affairs of the Soviet Union, Lavrentiy Beria, introduced a specious report to Joseph Stalin: "Armenians live in various parts of the peninsula. An Armenian committee, established by Germans, actively cooperates with Nazi Germany and is carrying out anti-Soviet [acts]." Later on, he suggested to deport all Bulgarians, Greeks and Armenians from Crimea. On June 2, 1944, he signed Directorate 5984, entitled "The Deportation of German satellites - Bulgarians, Greeks and Armenians from Crimea." This resolution deported 37,000 Bulgarians, Greeks and Armenians. The Armenians were sent to Perm Oblast, Sverdlovsk Oblast, Omsk Oblast, Kemerovo Oblast, Bashkortostan, Tatarstan and Kazakhstan.

In 1989, the communal life of the Crimea's Armenians was institutionalized with the formation of one of the peninsula's first national-cultural associations, the Armenian Luys (Light) Society. Later, after re-registration in 1996, it was renamed the Crimean Armenian Society. At present, the Crimean Armenian Society consists of 14 regional offices, coordinated by the National Council of Crimean Armenians. The highest governing body is the National Congress, which convenes at least once every four years. Operational management of the society is carried out by the executive committee, which functions in the periods between meetings of the National Council. The society runs the Luys Cultural and Ethnographic Center and publishes a monthly newspaper, Dove Masis. The one-hour Armenian-language program "Barev" airs twice a month on Crimean television, and radio broadcasts are made five times a week. There are Armenian churches in Yalta, Feodosia and Evpatoria, while the first Armenian secondary school opened in 1998 in Simferopol.

== Distribution ==
Armenians in the Crimea are currently concentrated in the cities of Simferopol, Yevpatoria, Feodosia, Kerch, Yalta, Sevastopol, and Sudak. The Armenia Diaspora Encyclopedia estimated that there were 20,000 Armenians living in the region as of 2003.

=== Feodosia ===
In the 1470s, Armenians comprised two thirds of the total population of Feodosia (numbering 46,000 out of 70,000). Until 1941 Armenians in Feodosia formed more than 20% of the total population of the city. According to the Feodosia Office of Statistics, there are only 557 Armenians living in Greater Feodosia itself.

== Community life ==
The community has taken a lively role in affairs concerning Armenia and Armenians and has contributed greatly to the region. This is seen more prominently in the context of Turkish foreign policy interests in the Crimea.

The Armenian community of the Crimea forms one of the most important centers of the Armenian Diaspora in the Black Sea region. Its members attach a great importance to Armenia and its foreign policy interests.

=== Gallery ===
==== Saint Hripsime Church of Yalta ====
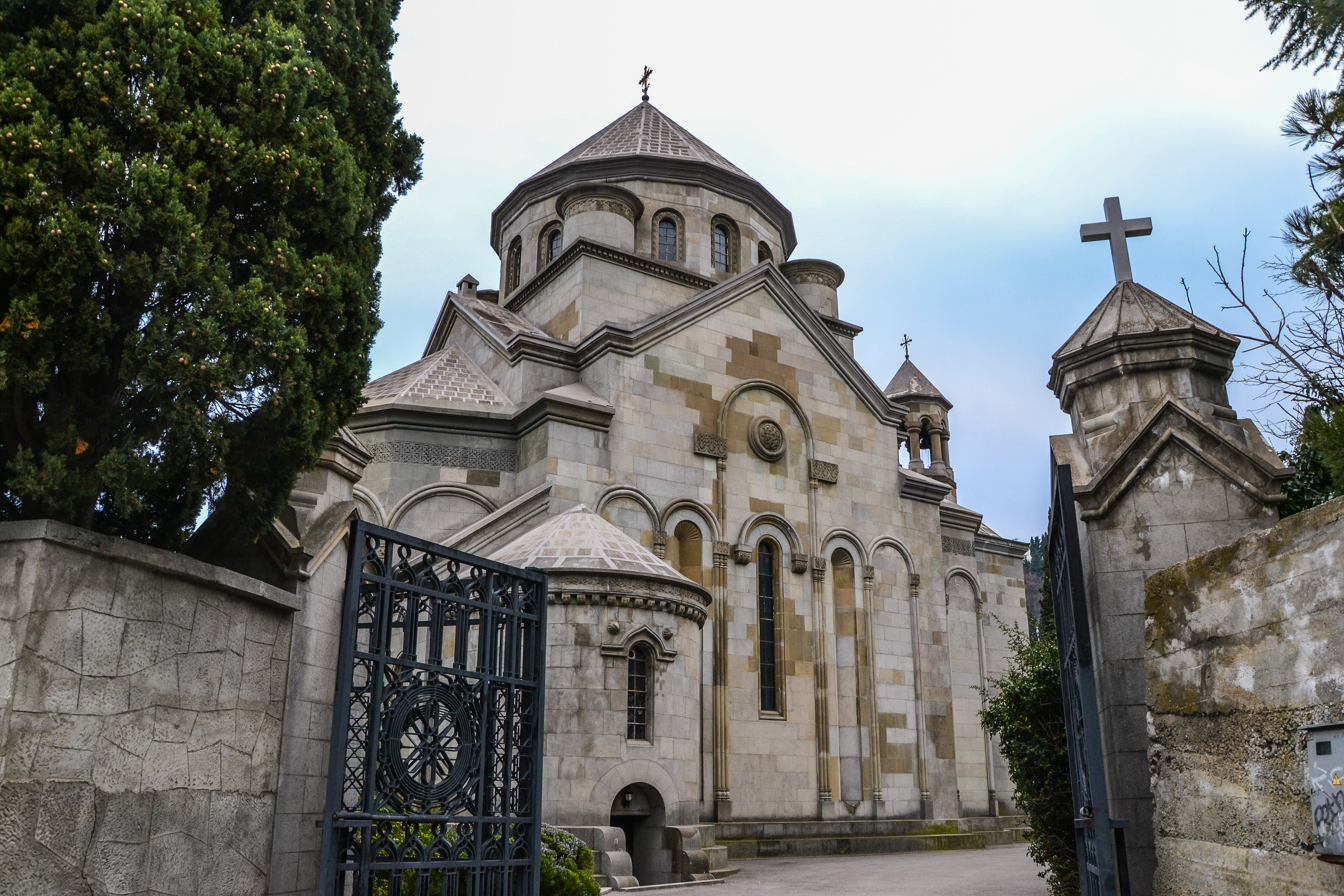

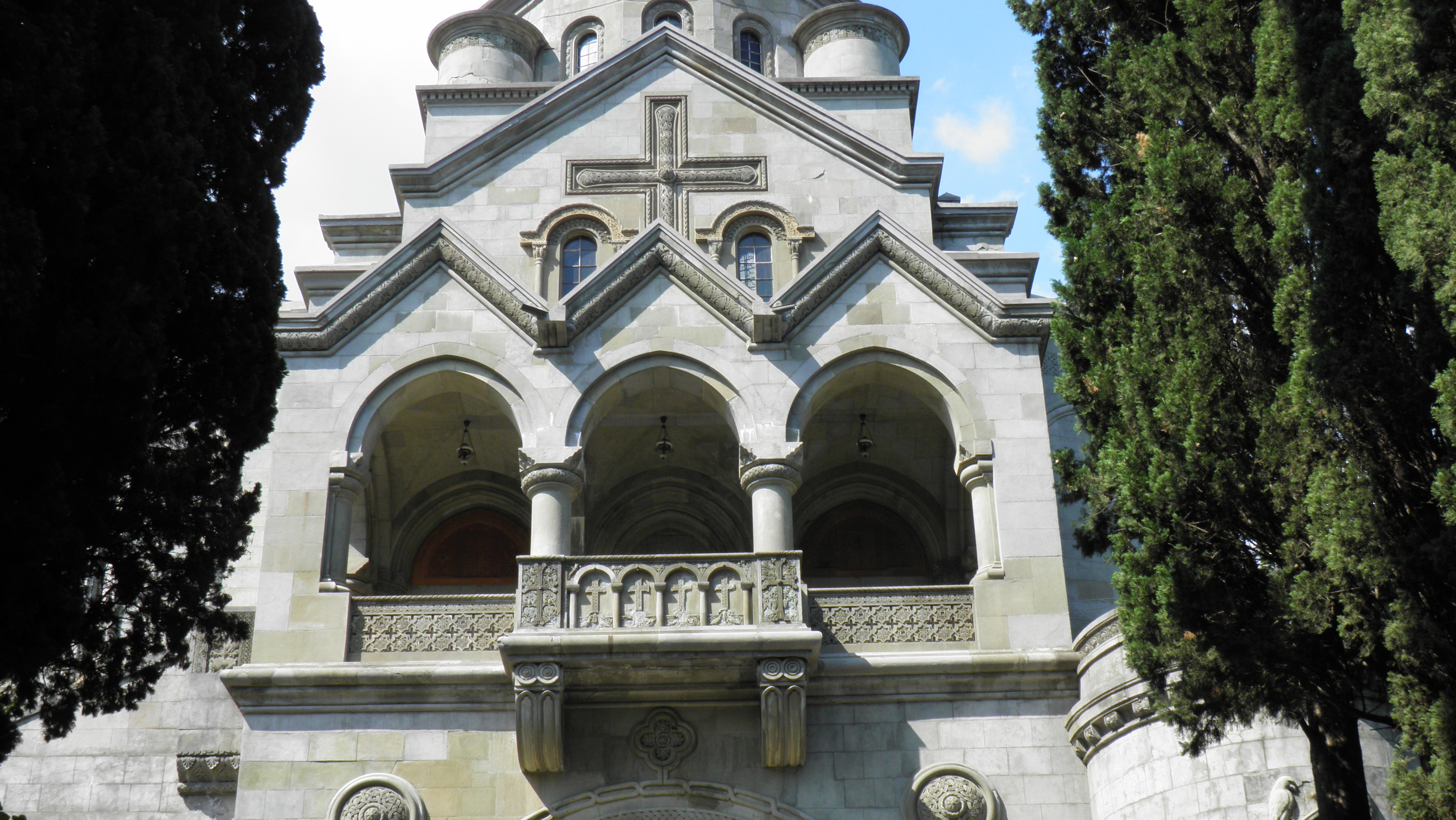

==== Surp Khach Monastery ====
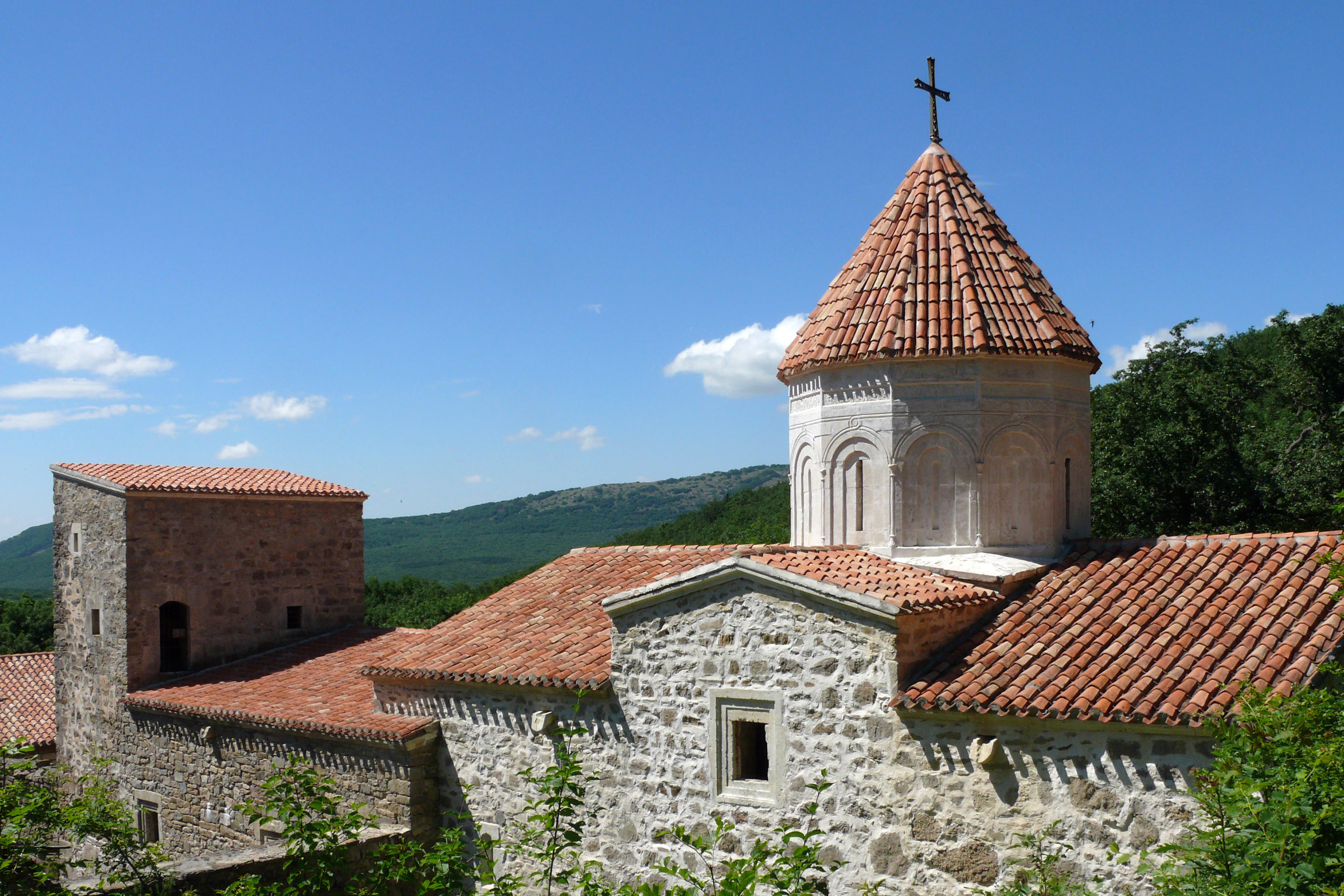

==== Armenian Church in Feodosia ====
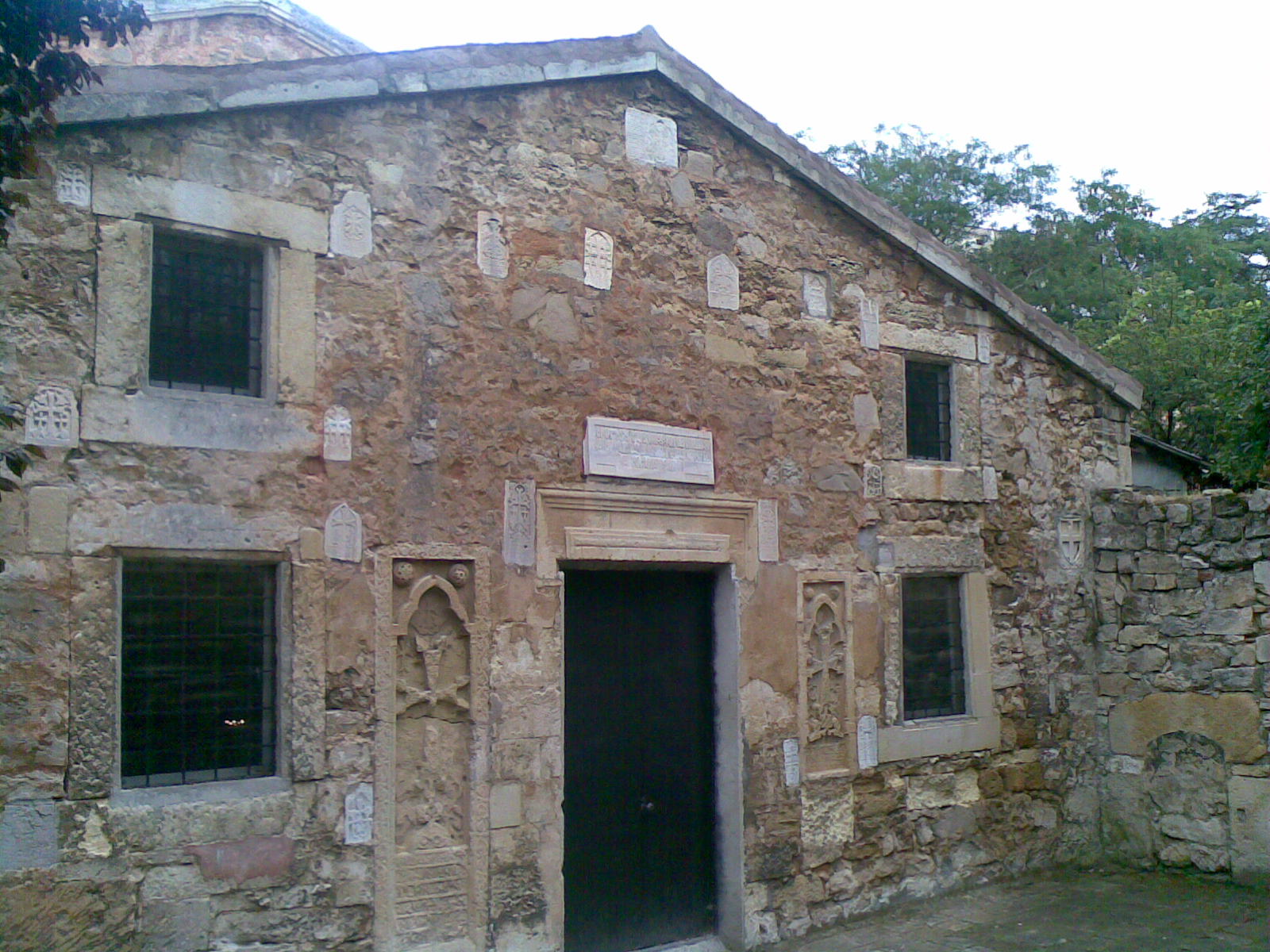

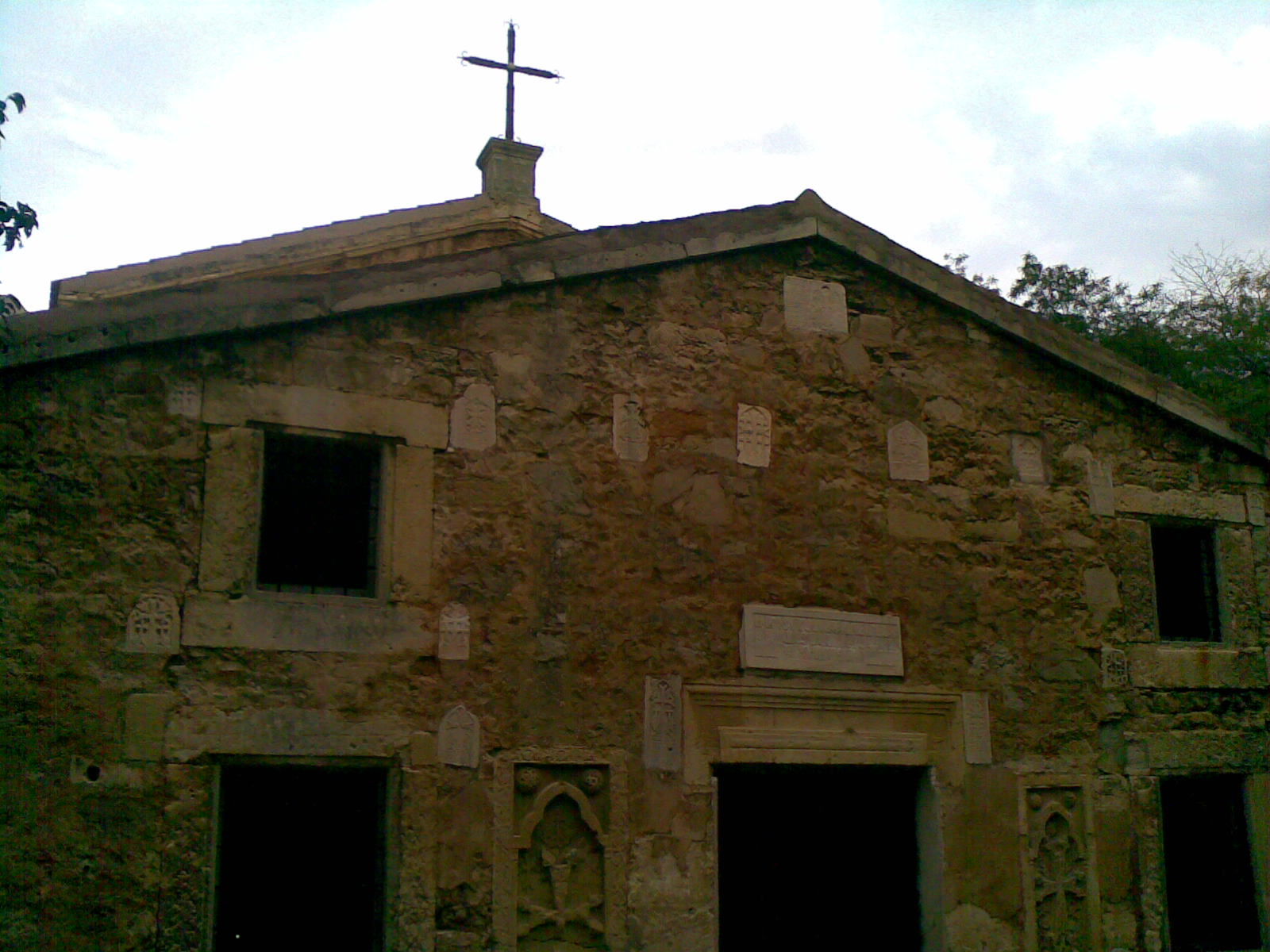

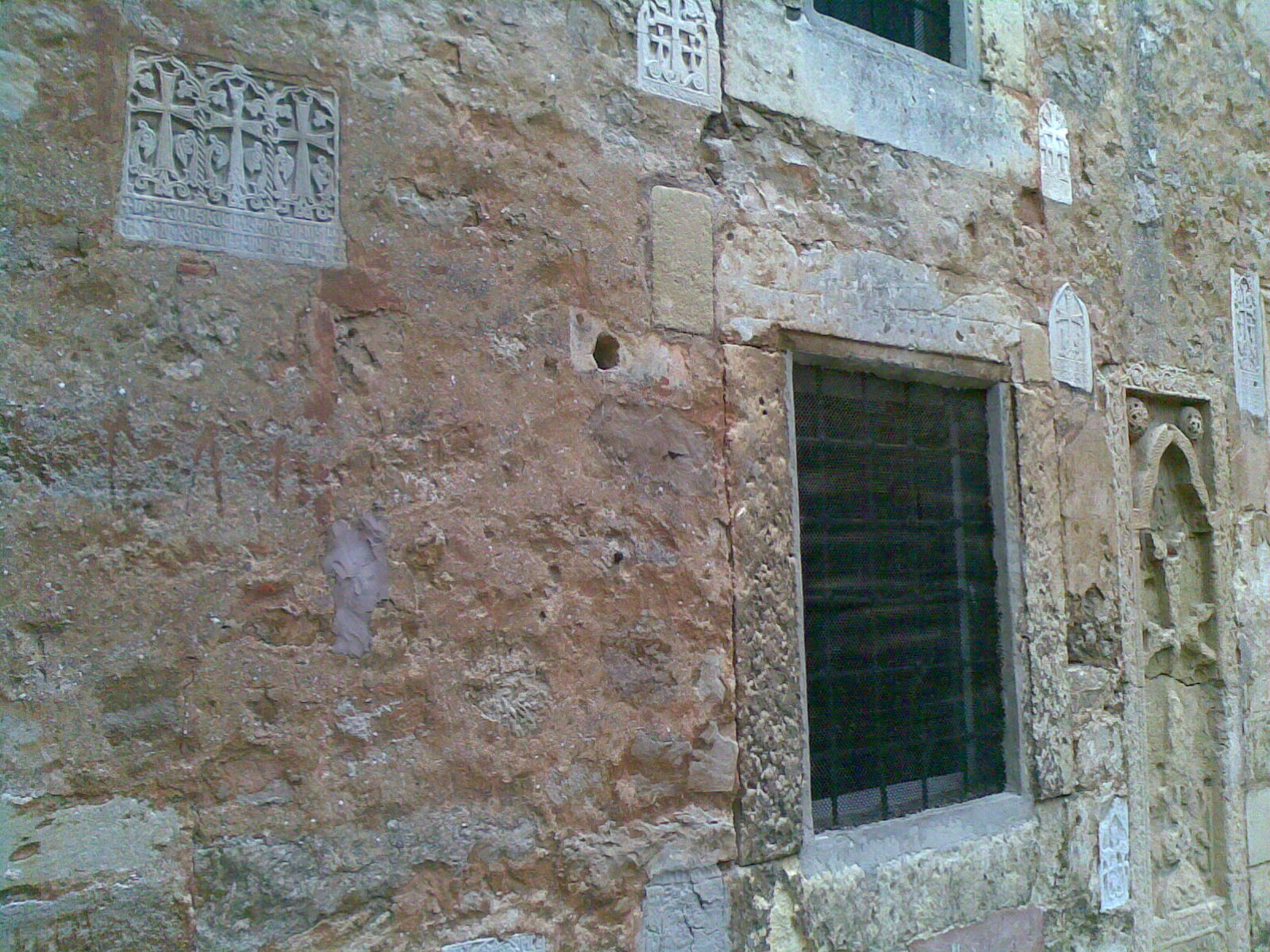

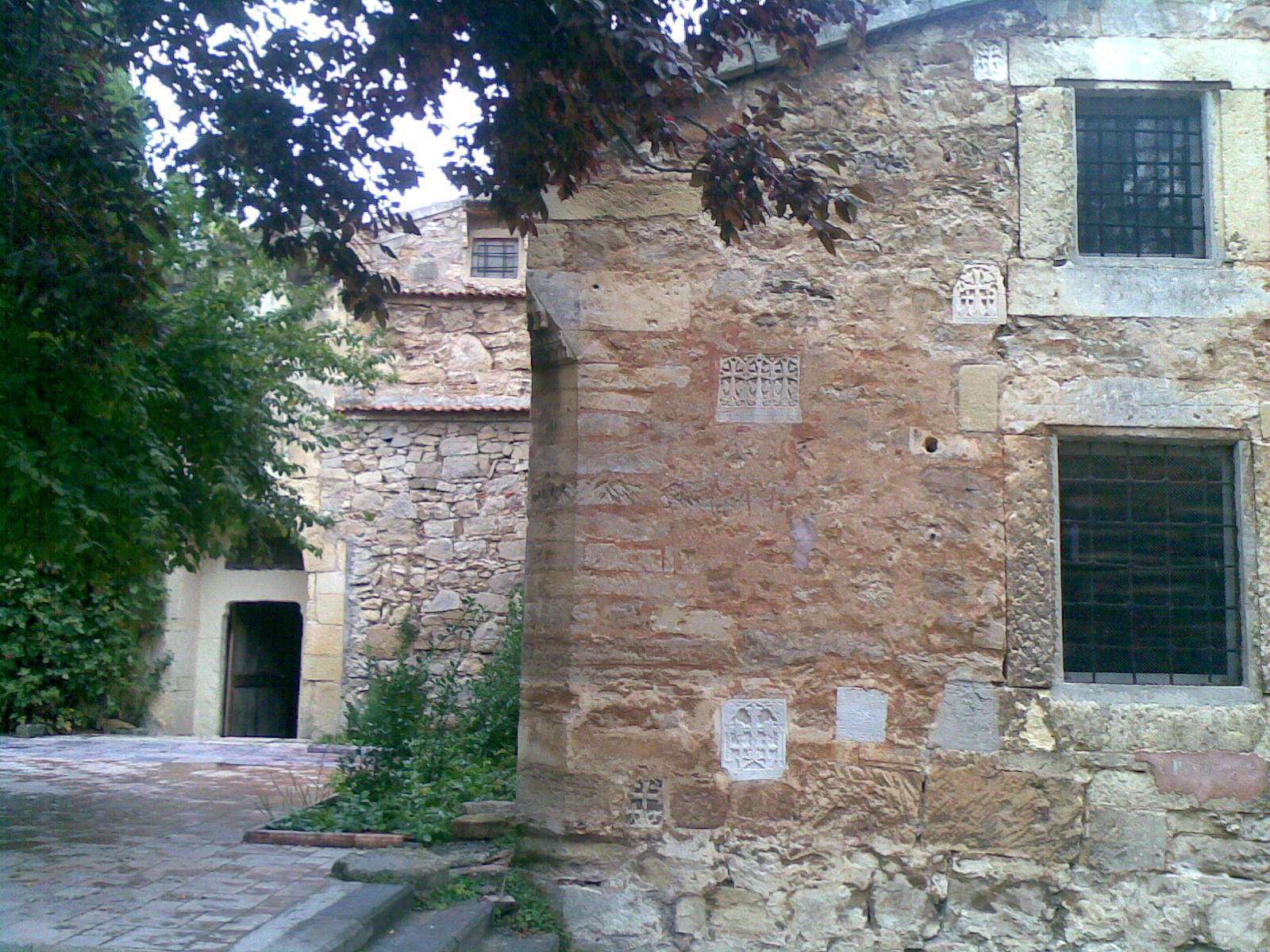

==== Other ====
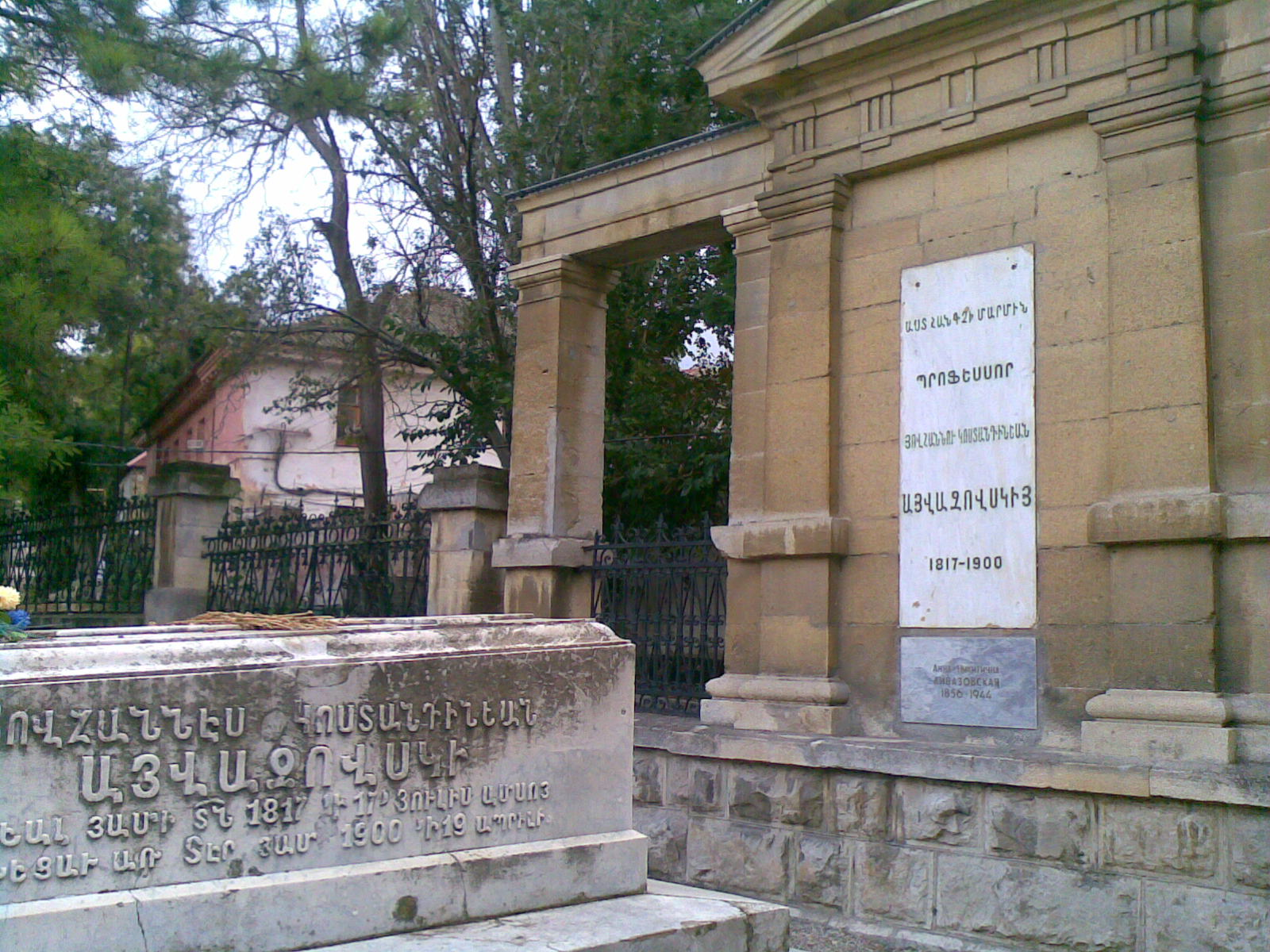
Ivan Aivazovsky grave

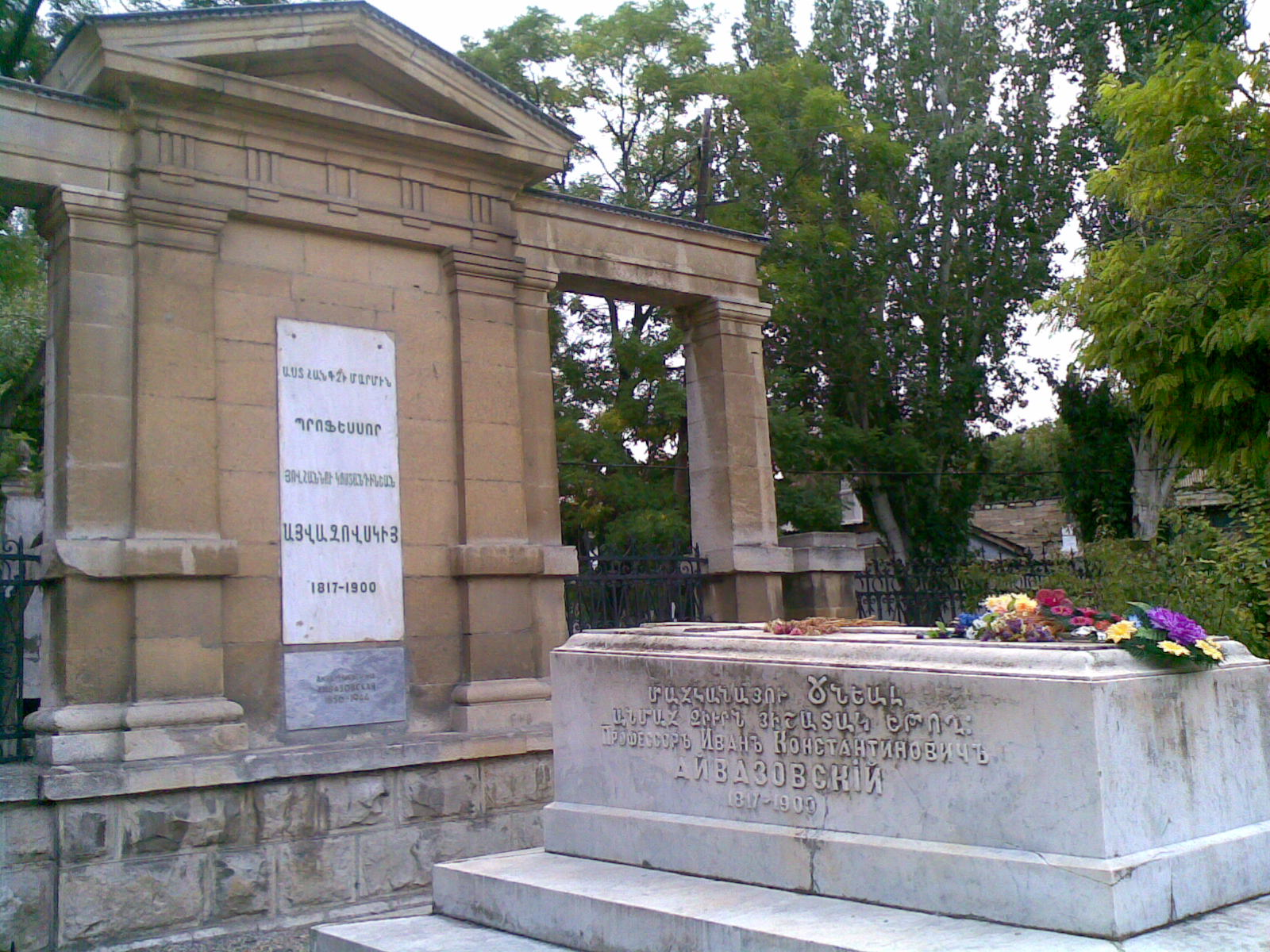
Ivan Aivazovsky grave

== Cultural heritage ==
=== Churches and cathedrals ===
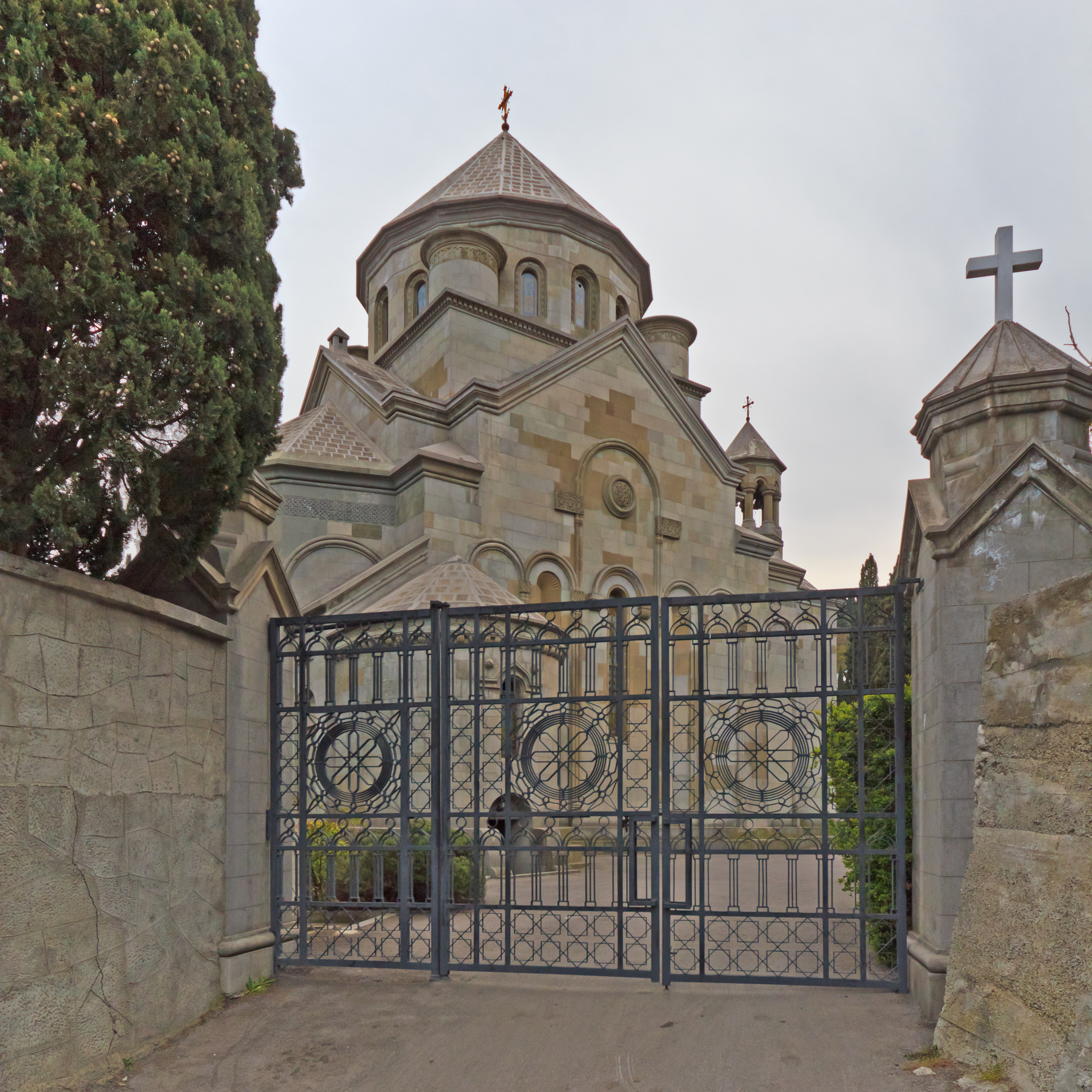
Saint Hripsime Church of Yalta in Yalta.

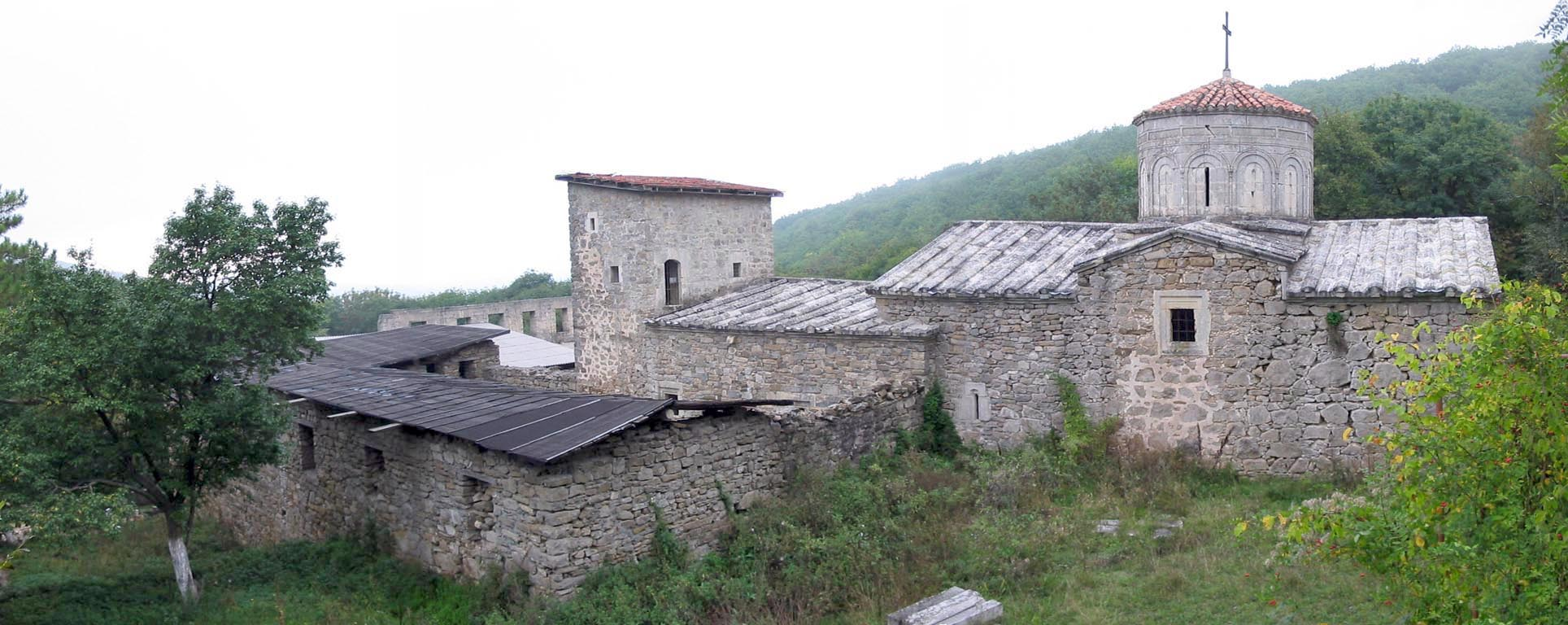
Ruins of the medieval Surb-Khach monastery near Staryi Krym, Crimea.

The Armenians were mostly adherents of the Armenian Apostolic Church. There were a number of churches built in Yalta (Saint Hripsime Church of Yalta), Feodosia and Yevpatoria. Construction activity took place from the 14th century and according to one manuscript the monastery of Gamchak had been built by the fifteenth century in Kafa.

In Kaffa, there were a number of Armenian schools, dozens of churches, banks, trading houses, caravanserai, and craftshops. The town served as a spiritual center for the Crimean Armenians, and its stature grew so prominently that in 1438 the Armenians of Kafa were invited to send representatives to the Ferrara-Florence Cathedral (Florence ecumenical council).

The second largest Armenian population after Kaffa in the same period was Surkhat. The name Surkhat is probably a distorted form of the name of the Armenian monastery Surb-Khach (Holy Cross). There were many Armenian churches, schools, neighborhoods here as well. Other major settlements included Sudak, where until the last quarter of the fifteenth century and near the monastery Surb-Khach there was a small Armenian town called Kazarat. Armenian princes kept the troops there and on a contractual basis to defend Kafa.

The social life of the Crimean Armenians surged in the late nineteenth and twentieth centuries. They organized themselves into community organizations. Wealthy Armenians and the church tried to "raise" the nation to the level of modern civilization, and to carry out charitable activities. The sources of money and material welfare of the church were grants, wills and offerings.

The church's role in the colonies was to some extent becoming secularized. In 1842, the Catholicos in Crimea lost his position to the Chief Guardian of the Crimean Armenian churches.

== Notable natives ==
- Khachatur of Kaffa (died 1658), priest and chronicler
- Martiros of Crimea, poet and historian
- Ivan Aivazovsky, a renowned Russian-Armenian marine painter, was born and mostly lived in the city of Feodosia
- Gabriel Aivazovsky, Archbishop
- Alexander Spendiaryan, composer, lived in Crimea
- Vardges Sureniants, painter, died in Yalta
- Sergey Mergelyan, mathematician
- Anushavan Danielyan, politician
- Jamala, singer, a half-Armenian
- Lazar Serebryakov, Russian Navy Admiral and founder of the city Novorossiysk

== See also ==
- Demographics of Crimea
- Armenians in Ukraine
- Armenian diaspora
