= Surb Khach =

Surb Khach, Armenian for the Holy Cross, can refer to:

- The Surb Khach Monastery in Crimea, Ukraine
- The Holy Cross Church, Nakhichevan on Don
- The Armenian Cathedral of the Holy Cross, in Lake Van, Turkey
