= Khachatur of Kaffa =

Crimean-Armenian chronicler (died 1658)

Khachatur of Kaffa, or Khachatur Kafaetsi (died 1658), was a Crimean-Armenian priest and chronicler from the coastal city of Kaffa.

== Bibliography ==
- Schütz, Edmund (1975). "Eine Armenische Chronik Von Kaffa Aus Der Ersten Hälfte Des 17. Jahrhunderts" (PDF). Acta Orientalia Academiae Scientiarum Hungaricae (in German). 29 (2): 133–186. ISSN 0001-6446.
- Poghosyan, Naira (2 November 2021). "An Armenian Chronicle of Crimea: Khachatur of Kaffa, d. 1658". In Karateke, Hakan T.; Anetshofer, Helga (eds.). The Ottoman World: A Cultural History Reader, 1450–1700. University of California Press. pp. 181–187. ISBN 9780520303430.
