= Ozbek Han Mosque =

Sunni mosque in Staryi Krym, Crimea

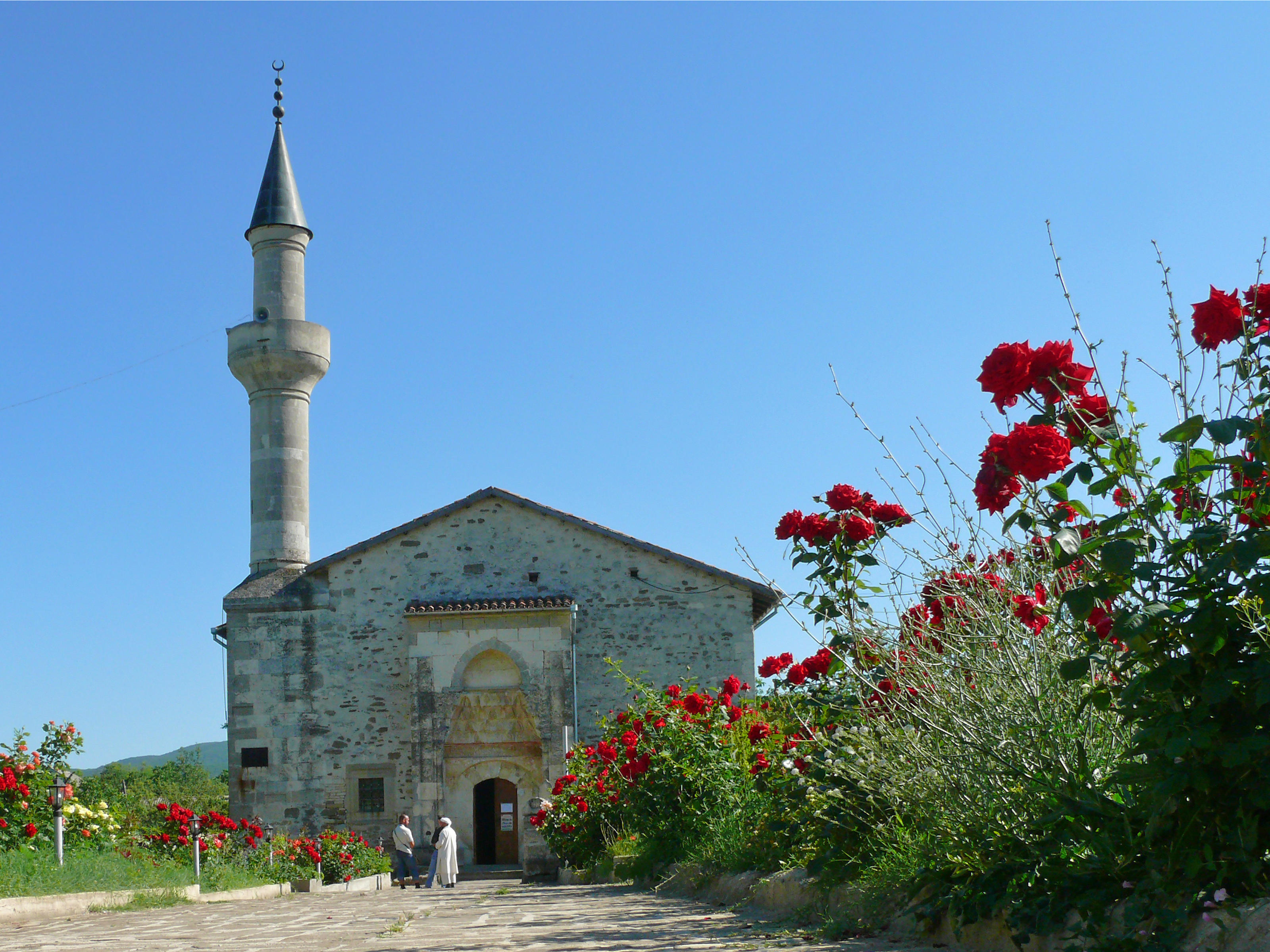

Religion
- Affiliation: Sunni Islam
- Status: Active

Location
- Location: Staryi Krym
- Interactive map of Ozbek Han Mosque
- Territory: Republic of Crimea (de facto); Autonomous Republic of Crimea (de jure)
- Coordinates: 45°01′45″N 35°05′19″E

Architecture
- Type: Mosque
- Completed: 1314
- Minaret: 1

Immovable Monument of National Significance of Ukraine
- Official name: Мечеть і медресе (Mosque and madrasa)
- Type: Architecture
- Reference no.: 010068

The Ozbek Han Mosque (Crimean Tatar: Özbek Han Camisi) is a mosque in Staryi Krym, Crimea. The Ozbek Han Mosque is the oldest mosque in Crimea, built during the reign of Özbeg Khan in 1314.

== History ==
Until the 14th century Staryi Krym was known as Solkhat, a prospering city during the reign of the Golden Horde. Early Crimean Khans had their capital in Solkhat until the first part of the 16th century, when the capital was moved to Bakhchisaray, and Solkhat gradually lost its importance as a cultural and economic center.

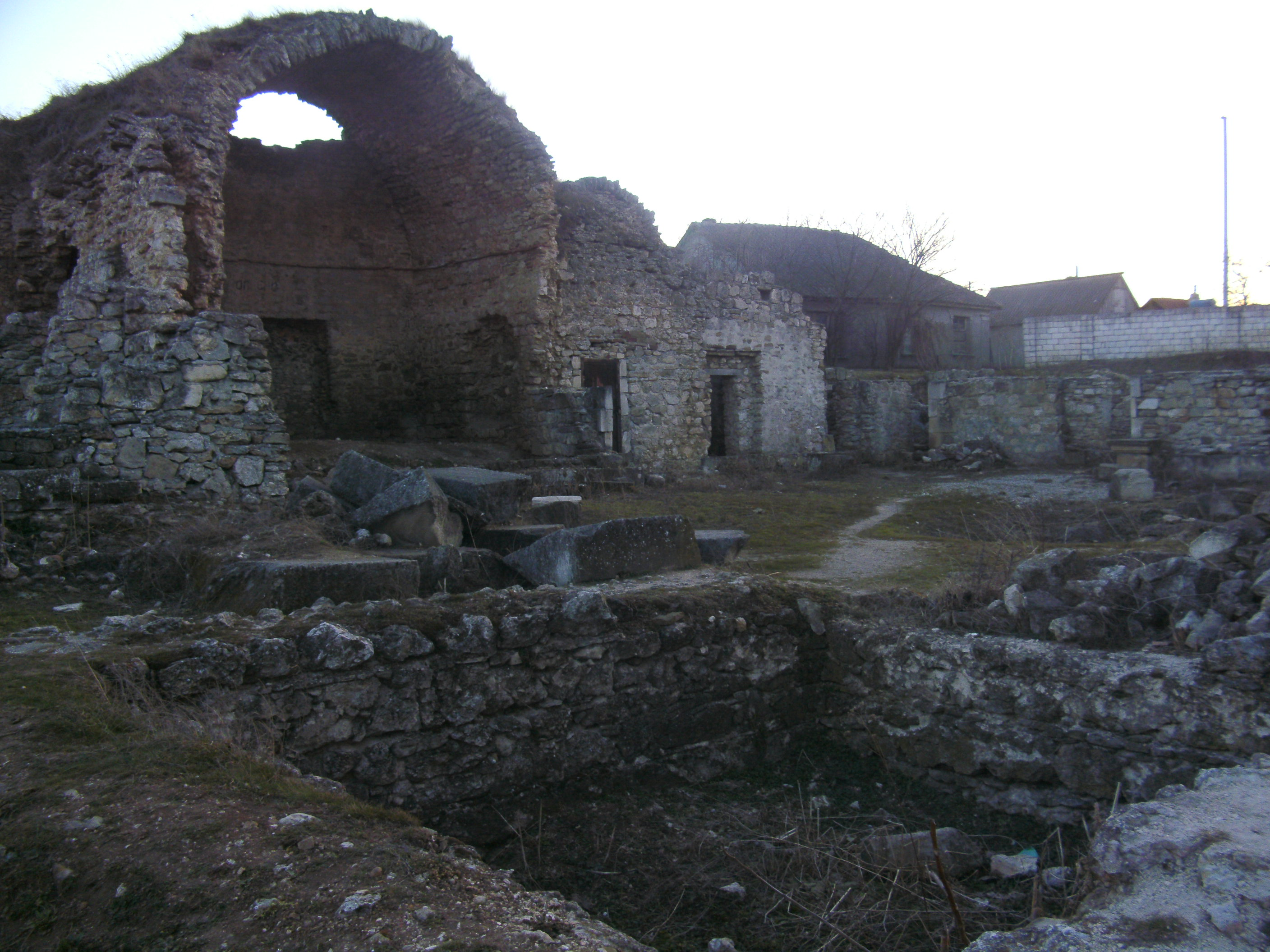
Madrasah of Eski Kirim(1332) next to Ozbek Han Mosque

The Ozbek Han Mosque was built in 1314 and the madrasah, adjacent to the southern wall of the mosque, was built by Inci Hatun, daughter of Kilburun Bey, in 1332. Of the madrasah only ruins remain today. The mosque has a square floor plan, which reveals architectural features similar to those found in Anatolia during the Seljuk period. A unique feature of the mosque is its monumental entrance with a carved wooden door.

Today, Staryi Krym has a small but devoted Crimean Tatar population, and the Ozbek Han Mosque is once again functioning as a place of worship.

== See also ==
- Islam in Ukraine
- Islam in Russia
- List of mosques in Russia
- List of mosques in Europe
