= Alexander Grin House Museum =

Several Alexander Grin museums in Russia and Ukraine

Coordinates: 45°01′30″N 35°04′53″E

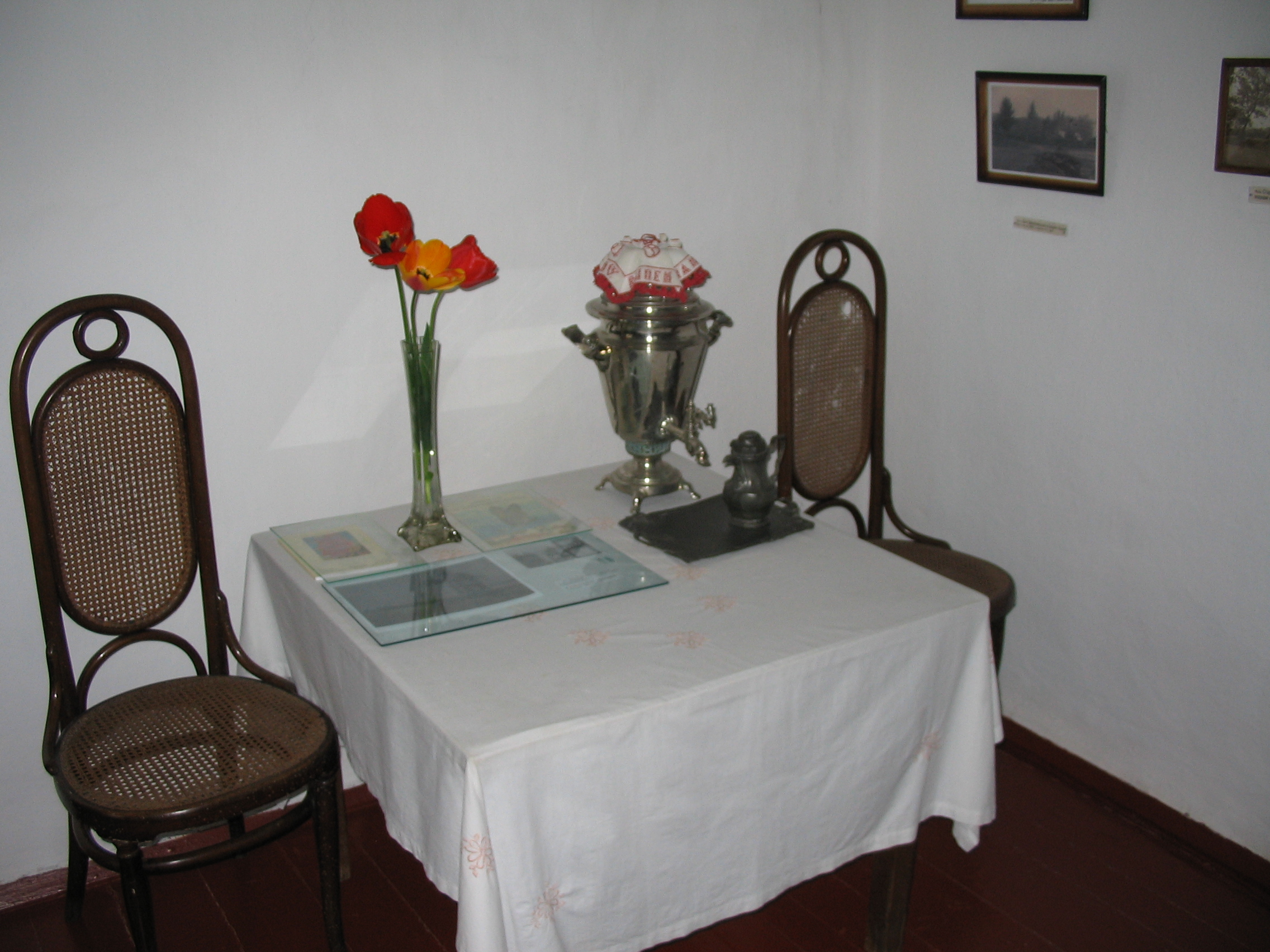
- Table at the Alexander Grin house museum
- Location: Staryi Krym

There are four Alexander Grin House Museums. The first one is a house museum in the last place of residence of Russian writer Alexander Grin which was in Staryi Krym, Crimea.

There is another Grin museum in Crimea in the nearby city of Feodosia. There is a third Alexander Grin museum in Russia, in Vyatka.

In 2010, a fourth museum was opened at the birthplace of the writer, in Slobodskoy, Kirov Oblast in Russia.
