= Saint Hripsime Church of Yalta =

Armenian Apostolic church in Yalta, Crimea

Saint Hripsime Church Սուրբ Հռիփսիմե եկեղեցի
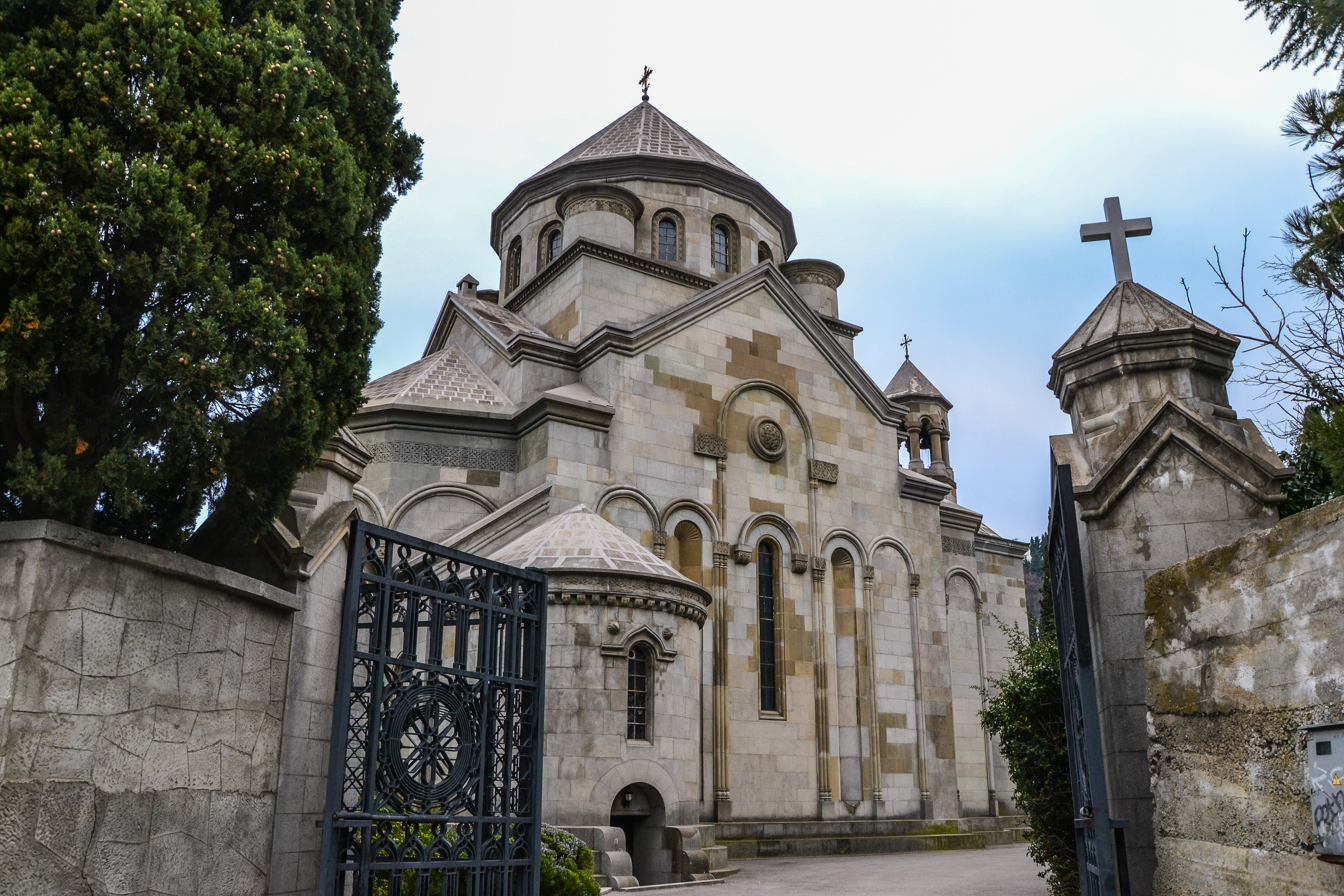

- Location within Ukraine

Religion
- Affiliation: Armenian Apostolic Church
- Year consecrated: 1917

Location
- Location: Yalta
- Coordinates: 44.501094°N 34.165334°E

Architecture
- Architect: Gabriel Ter-Mikelyan
- Style: Armenian
- Groundbreaking: 1909
- Completed: 1917

Immovable Monument of Local Significance of Ukraine
- Official name: Церква вірменська (Armenian church)
- Type: Architecture, Monumental Art
- Reference no.: 4883-АР

Saint Hripsime Church (Armenian: Սուրբ Հռիփսիմե եկեղեցի, Surp Hripsime Yekeghetsi), is a working Armenian church located in Yalta on the Crimean peninsula, Ukraine and completed in 1917.

It is modeled after a church of the same name in Vagharshapat, Armenia. In fact, a piece of that UNESCO World Heritage site church was symbolically used in the base of this church.

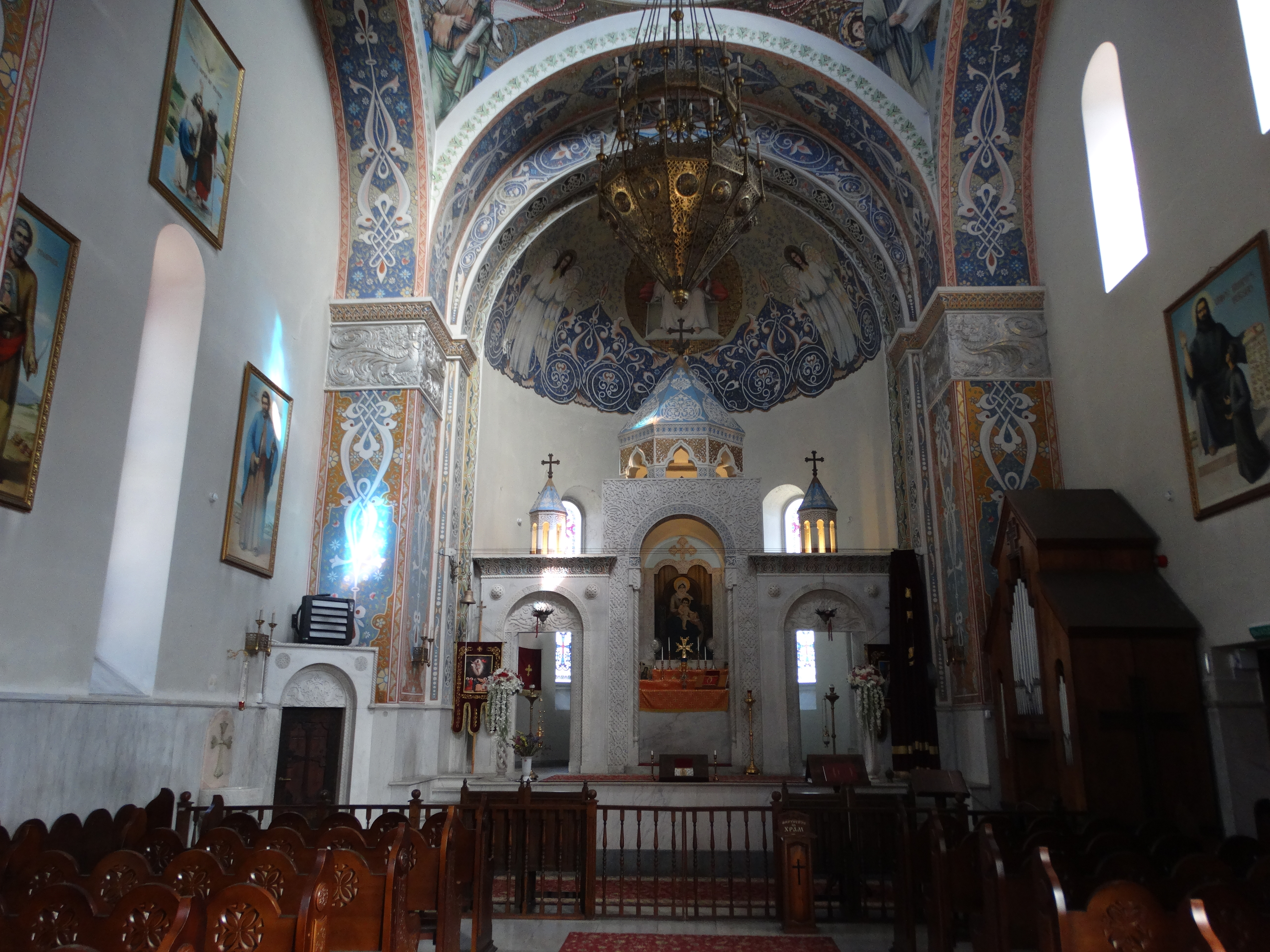
Saint Hripsime in Yalta (inner view)

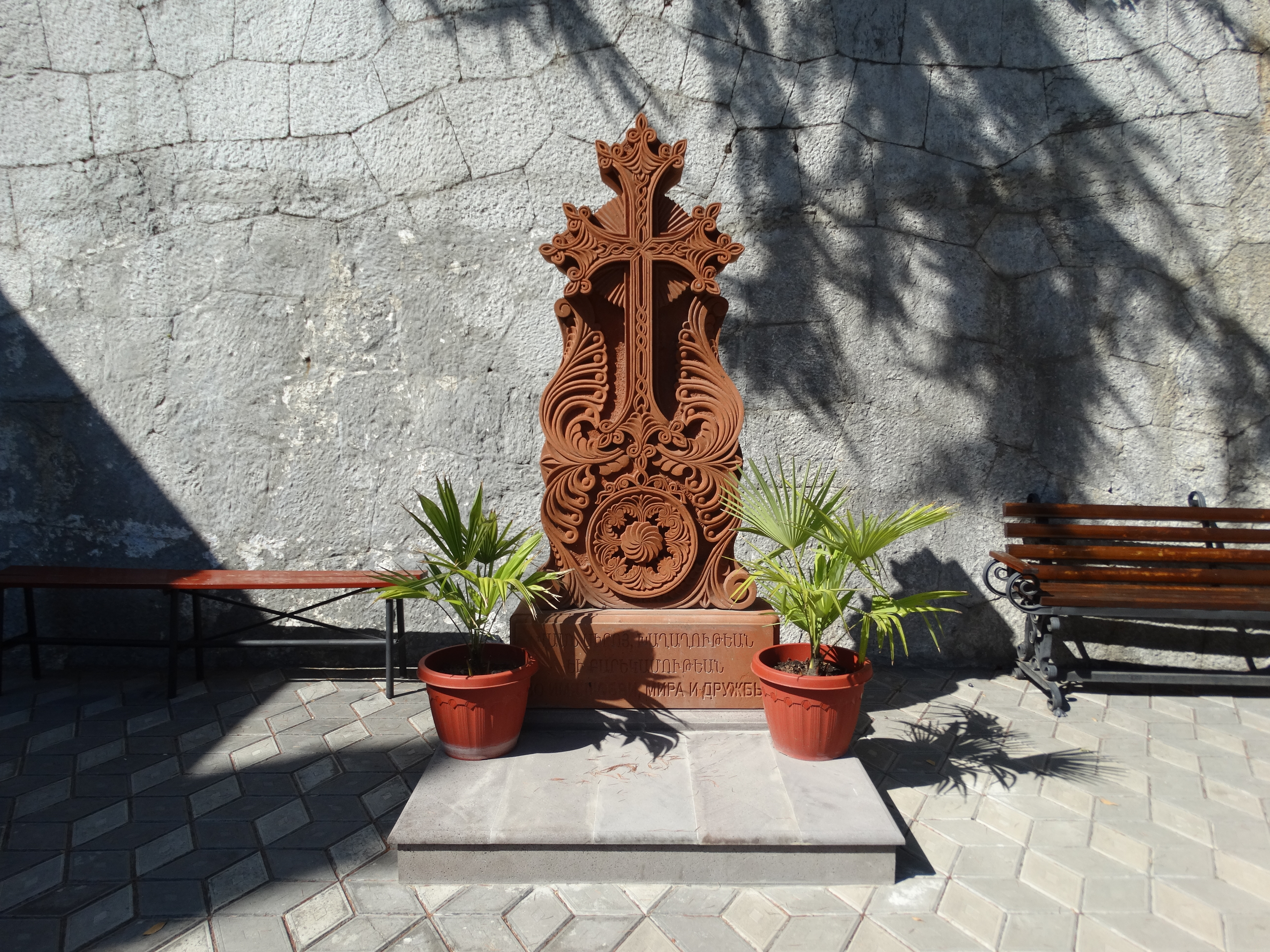
The Khachkar near Saint Hripsime Church
