= Staryi Krym =

City in Crimea

Staryi Krym Старий Крим Старый Крым Eski Qırım
- City
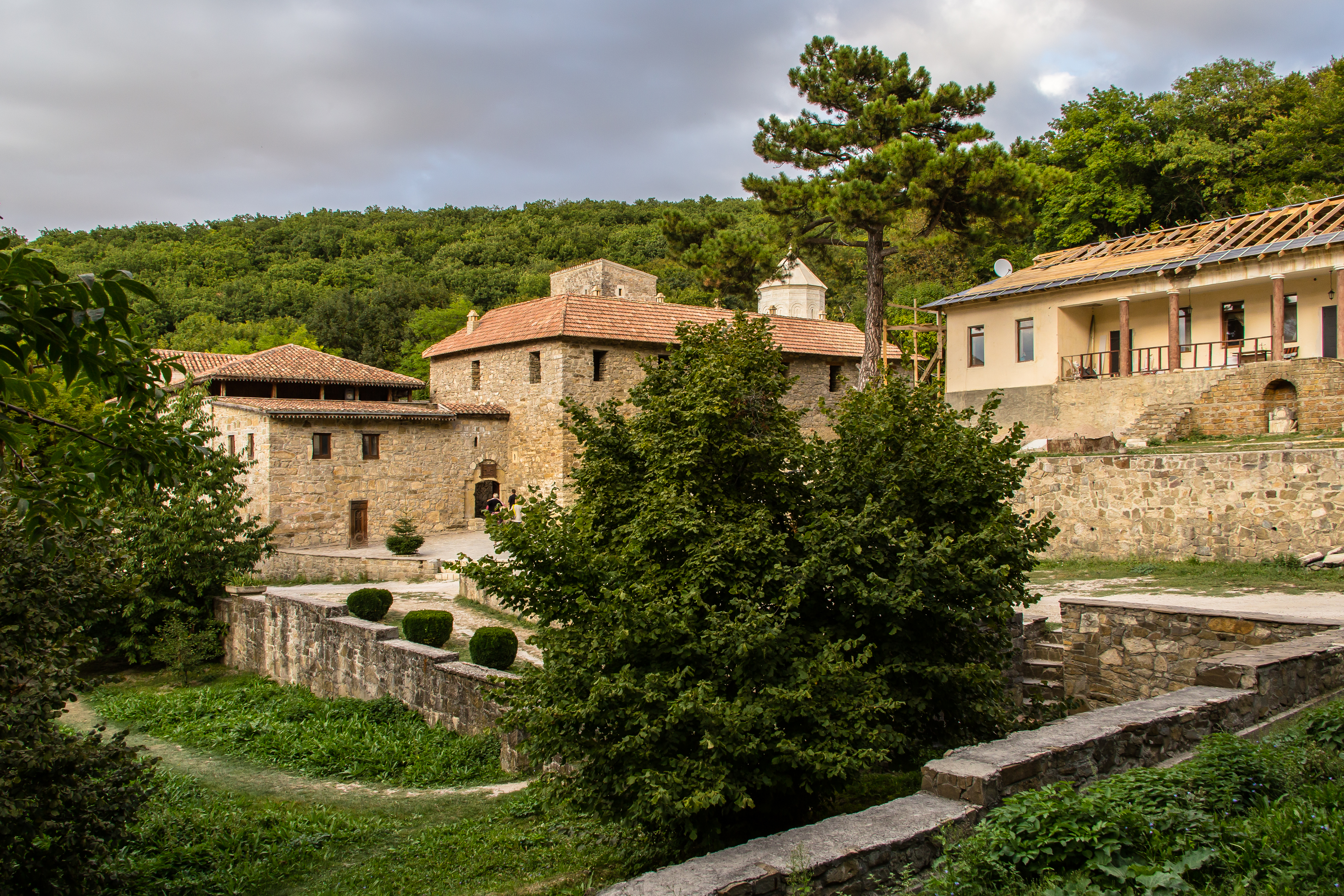
- Surp Khach Monastery

- Flag Coat of arms
- Interactive map of Staryi Krym
- Location of Staryi Krym within Crimea Staryi Krym (Ukraine) Staryi Krym (Russia)
- Coordinates: 45°1′45″N 35°5′19″E
- Country: Ukraine (occupied by Russia)
- Autonomous republic: Crimea (de jure)
- Raion: Feodosia Raion (de jure)
- Federal subject: Crimea (de facto)
- District: Kirovske District (de facto)

Area
  - Total: 9.97 km^{2} (3.85 sq mi)
- Elevation: 300 m (980 ft)

Population (2014)
  - Total: 9,277
  - Density: 1,000/km^{2} (2,600/sq mi)
- Time zone: UTC+3
- Postal code: 97345
- Area code: +7-36555
- Climate: Cfb
- Former name: Solkhat (until the 14th century)
- Website: solhat.com

Staryi Krym (Ukrainian: Старий Крим; Crimean Tatar: Eski Qırım; Russian: Старый Крым; Armenian: Հին Ղրիմ lit. 'Old Crimea' in all four languages) is a small historical city and former bishopric in Kirovske (Isliam-Terek) Raion of Crimea, Ukraine. It has been occupied by Russia since 2014 (see Annexation of Crimea by the Russian Federation). It is located in the Eastern Crimean Peninsula, approximately 25 km (15 mi.) west of Theodosia. Population: 9,277 (2014 Census).

== Names ==
During the late 13th century, the town was known as either Solkhat (Solkhad, Solghad, Ṣulġāt صلغات) or as Qrım (al-Qirim/Kirim القرم). Neither name is attested prior to the 13th century, but on the authority of al-Qalqashandi, Solkhat is the older of the two, dating to the period prior to the Mongol conquest in mid-1238. Both names coexisted during the 14th century, but the name Qırım came to displace Solkhat by the early 15th. The origin of either name is uncertain. Some consider Solkhat to be related to the Greek Colchis.

Before the Mongol period, mention is made in Greek hagiography of the residence of the Khazar governor of the eastern part of the peninsula, as a fortress named Phoulla or Phoullai (Φοῦλλαι, although other sources identify this place with Chufut-Kale) along with Sugdaia (Sudak); it is likely that the site of this fortress corresponds to the site of Solghat.

The name Qirim may continue the old name Cimmerium (after the Cimmerians). The Strait of Kerch was known as Bosporus Cimmerius in the Roman era (as reported by Ptolemy, Polybius, and Strabo), after the city of Cimmerium which stood nearby. The promontory or peninsula on which it stood was known as Promontorium Cimmerium (Κιμμέριον ἄκρον). The 13th-century toponym Qrim is likely explained as a corruption of the name Cimmerium. There are however alternative suggestions, such as derivation from the Greek Cremnoi (Κρημνοί, in post-classical Koiné Greek pronunciation, Crimni, i.e., "the Cliffs", referenced by Herodotus 4.20.1 and 4.110.2) or from a Mongolian appellation.

The name "Crimea" (for the Crimean Khanate, and later also for the peninsula itself) is derived from the name of the city). It became adopted as an alternative term for what used to be known as Tauris or Tauric Peninsula in western languages from the 17th century.

Since the annexation of Crimea by Catherine II of Russia in 1783, the town has been known by the Russian name Staryi Krym (Russian staryi meaning "old", rendered in Crimean Tatar as eski; also transliterated as Staroi Krim and variants). Although officially the town was renamed Levkopol after the ancient Greek name of Leukopolis (White City), this never gained popularity, perhaps because the town already styled a name from antiquity.

== History ==
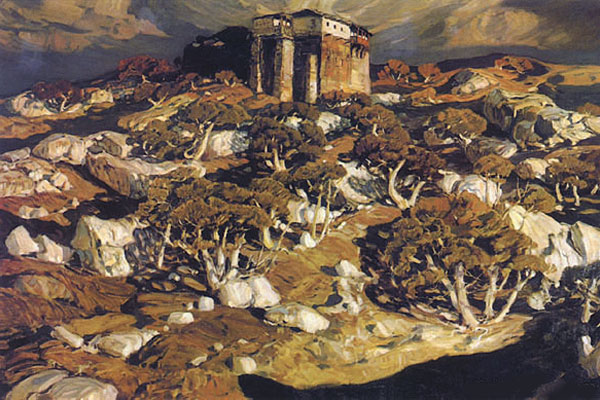
Konstantin Bogaevsky, Staryi Krym, 1903

The town was probably the site of an earlier Khazar fortress before the Mongol conquest of the Crimea in mid-1238. The Mongols under Batu Khan fortified the town and thereafter it became a capital of the Crimean Yurt (Crimean province of the Golden Horde) and a home for the Emir of Crimea.

Before the 1270s, Qrim had been a village surrounding a fort at best, but by the early 14th century it had grown into a prosperous city. Kaykaus II was given Qrim as a fief in c. 1265. Tatar coins were struck in Qrim from 1287/8 (AH 686) and in the same year, an Egyptian architect was sent there to build a mosque to be named after the Egyptian sultan.

From that period remain the Ozbek Han Mosque, built in 1314 by Uzbeg Khan, and the ruins of a madrassa built in 1332. The town prospered during the 14th century, but it was completely destroyed during the civil unrest under Mengli Girai in the later 15th century. Qrim seems to have retained its position as capital of the newly established Crimean Khanate for some years, as coins struck here are dated to as late as 1517 (AH 923), after which point in 1532 the capital of the Ottoman vassal state was moved to Bağçasaray, and the city declined into relative obscurity. After the Russian conquest of the Crimean Khanate in the 1770s, the city of Staryi Krym was given the Greek name of Leukopolis (Lewkopol), but this name never entered common usage. In 1863, the town had a population of 1,085, of which 43.4% were Armenian Christian, 42.8% were Eastern Orthodox, 13.1% were Muslim, and 0.7% were Protestant. In the late 19th century, the inhabitants were mostly employed in gardening, tobacco cultivation and farming.

In 1812, shortly before Napoleon's invasion, the Countess Jeanne de Gachet, wife of a French emigrant and victim of the revolution, had been living in Saint Petersburg for some time. She said she was aware of many events at the court of Louis XVI. Tsar Alexander I then wanted to meet her in person and, once met at her palace, she confessed to him that she was actually the Countess Jeanne de La Motte-Valois, the sad heroine of the necklace affair. Naturalized Russian for some secret services rendered to Russian diplomacy, Alexander was the only person she confided in. Having admit her past guilt, as a Vendean she had long followed the heroic bands that had resisted the republican armies. In 1824, by order of the emperor who did not grant the extradition of the state criminal requested by the French ambassador, she was exiled to the Crimea with a group of pietists, settling permanently in a modest peasant house in the small village of Staryi Krym. Two years later, in the spring, sensing that she was close to death, after having destroyed all the papers and burned the compromising documents in her possession, she asked the Armenians of the church that her body be buried with the clothes she was wearing at the moment, without being stripped. Falling from a horse, she died on April 23, 1826. However, according to local custom, her body had to be washed before burial, so her recommendations were not heeded. It was then that, while cleaning the body, she noticed her branding on her right shoulder and chest, proving her real identity. As a result, by express order of the new Emperor Nicholas I, her belongings were shipped to the Russian capital.

Staryi Krym was the city where the famous Russian writer Alexander Grin lived and died, and now has a museum dedicated to him. The city is home to an important cardiac sanatorium, formerly run by notable heart surgeon Nikolai Amosov.

During World War II, the German occupiers operated a Sicherheitsdienst prison in the town.

== Demographics ==
Historical populations
Year	Pop.	±%
1805	114	—
1863	1,085	+851.8%
1926	4,738	+336.7%
1939	5,141	+8.5%
1989	9,196	+78.9%
2001	9,960	+8.3%
2011	9,446	−5.2%

=== Ethnic groups ===
As of the Ukrainian national census in 2001, the town had a population of 9,960 people. The population mostly consists of ethnic Russians and Crimean Tatars. The share of ethnic Ukrainians living in the town barely exceeds 10%, which is the lowest percentage recorded in any major settlement on the whole Crimean peninsula. The exact ethnic composition was as follows:

2001 Ukrainian census
	percent
Russians	53.79%
Crimean Tatars	29.17%
Ukrainians	10.22%
Tatars	2.80%
Belarusians	0.64%
Armenians	0.23%
Azerbaijanis	0.14%
Poles	0.11%

== Ecclesiastical history ==
As Phulli, it was one of the bishoprics in the Roman client-state, later province, of the Bosporan Kingdom, where no imperial metropolis was established, and it faded under heathen rule.

The diocese was nominally restored in 1929, as a Latin Catholic titular archbishopric (Curiate Italian name Fulli).

It has been vacant for decades, having had the following incumbents of the intermediary (archiepiscopal) rank:

- Francis Joseph Beckman (1946.11.11 – 1948.10.17)
- Gabriele M. Reyes (1949.08.25 – 1949.10.13)
- Pasquale Mores (1950.01.31 – 1960.05.15)
- Willem Pieter Adrian Maria Mutsaerts (1960.06.27 – 1964.08.16)

== Gallery ==
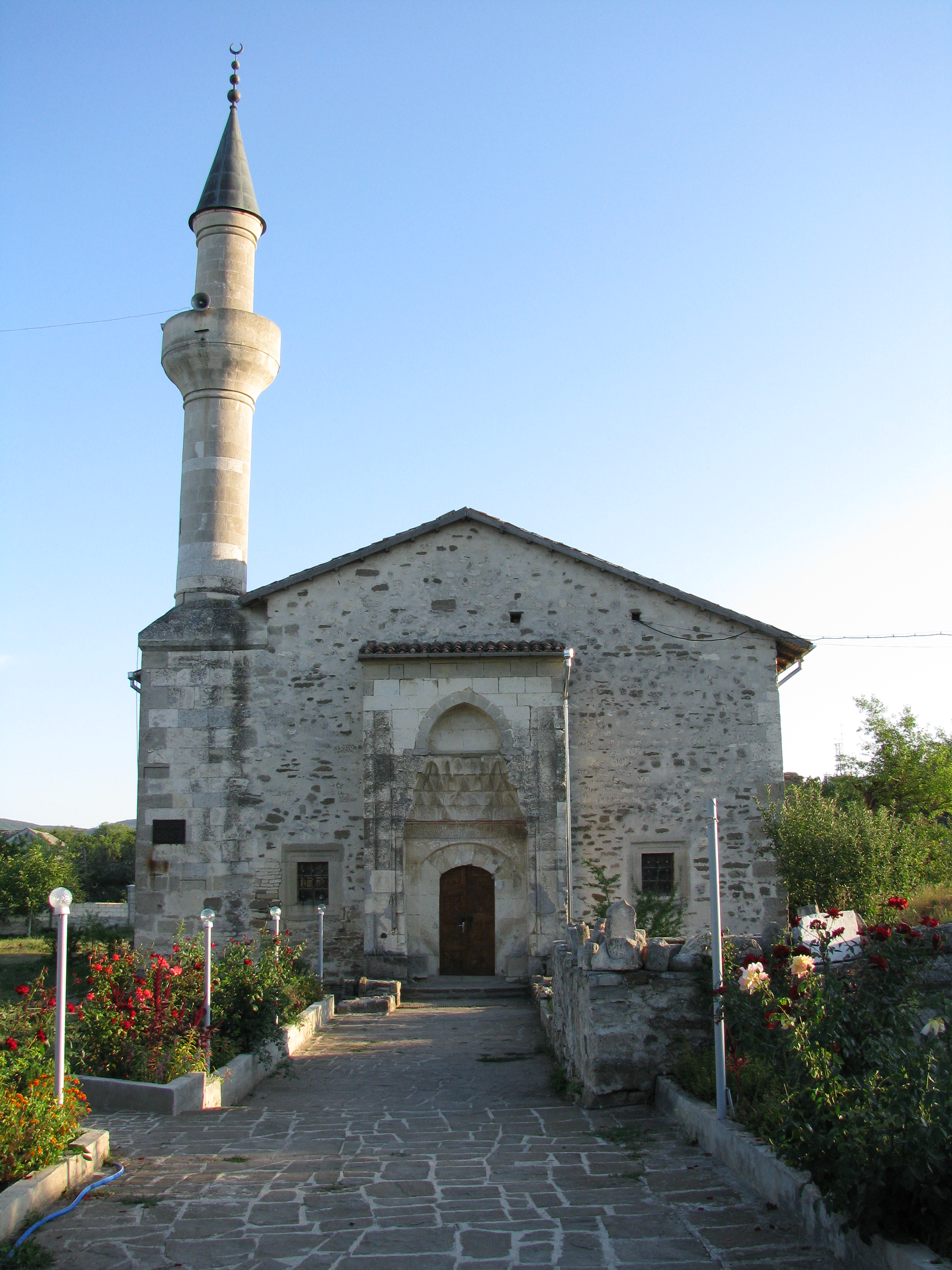
Ozbek Han Mosque

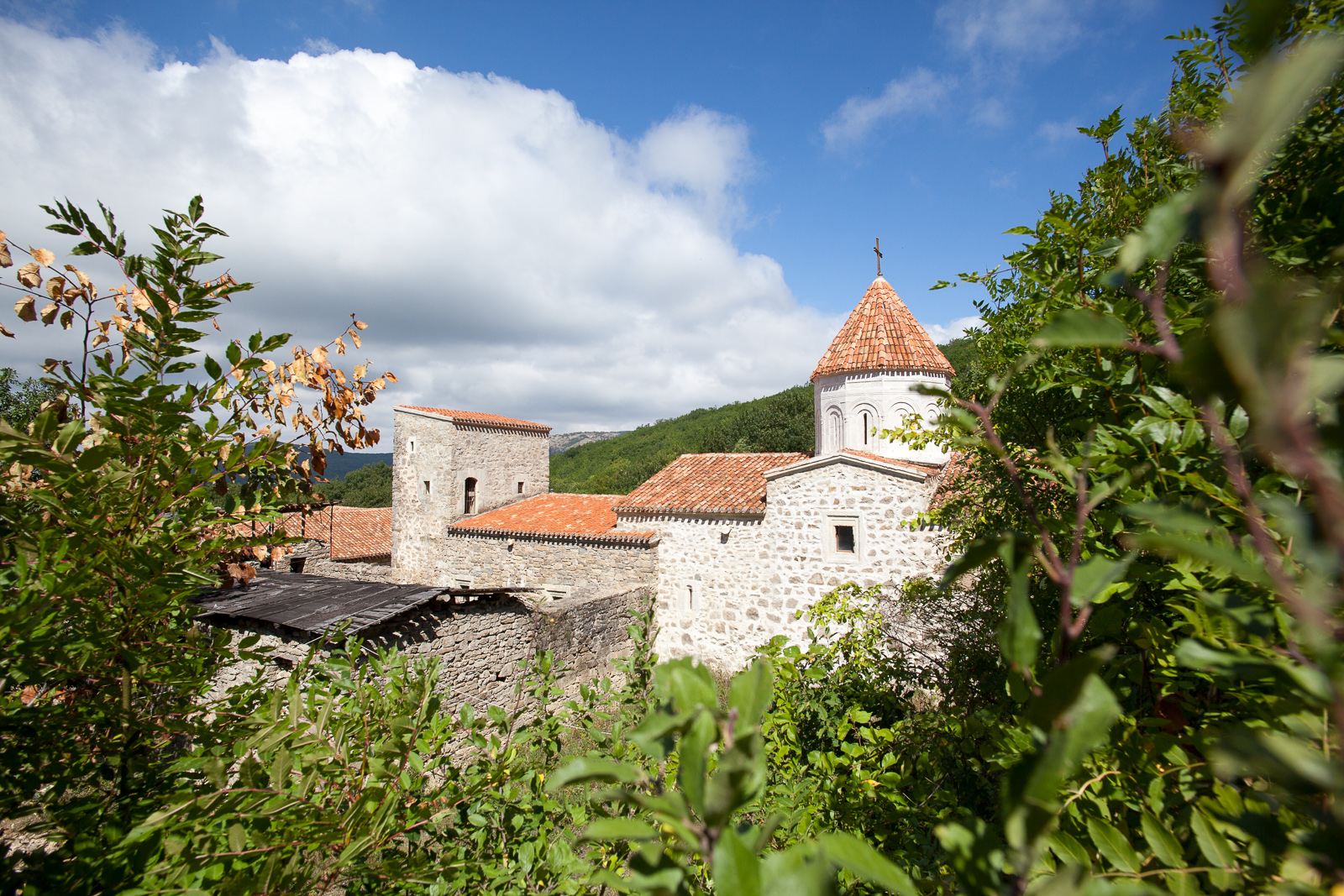
Surb Khach Armenian monastery

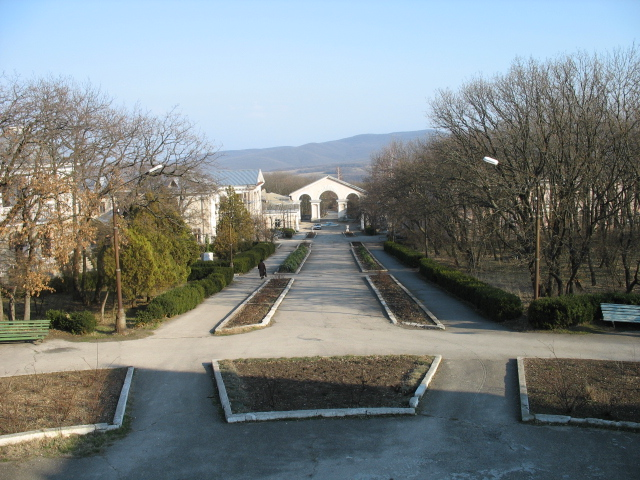
Health resort in Staryi Krym

== Notable people ==
- Abraham Kirimi, medieval Karaite rabbi
- Leonid Tkachenko (1953–2024), Ukrainian-Russian football player and coach
