= Lazar Serebryakov =

- Ղազար Արծաթագործեան
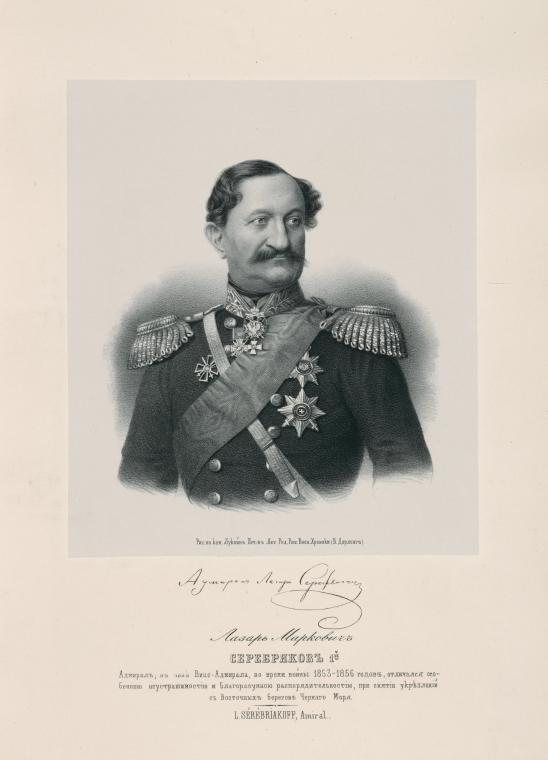
- Born: Ghazar Artsatagortsian; 1795
- Died: 1862 (aged 66–67)
- Occupation: Naval officer

Lazar Markovich Serebryakov (Russian: Лазарь Маркович Серебряков; 1792–1862), born Ghazar Artsatagortsian (Armenian: Ղազար Արծաթագործեան), was a Russian Navy Admiral of Armenian descent. He participated in the Russo-Turkish War, 1828-1829, serving in the Black Sea and Baltic fleets, commanding battleships. In 1838, he laid the foundation of the city of Novorossiysk. He also held top command positions during the Crimean War (1853–1856).

== See also ==
- List of Armenians
