= Surp Khach Monastery =

Armenian Apostolic monastery in Staryi Krym, Crimea

Surp Khach Monastery Սուրբ Խաչ վանք
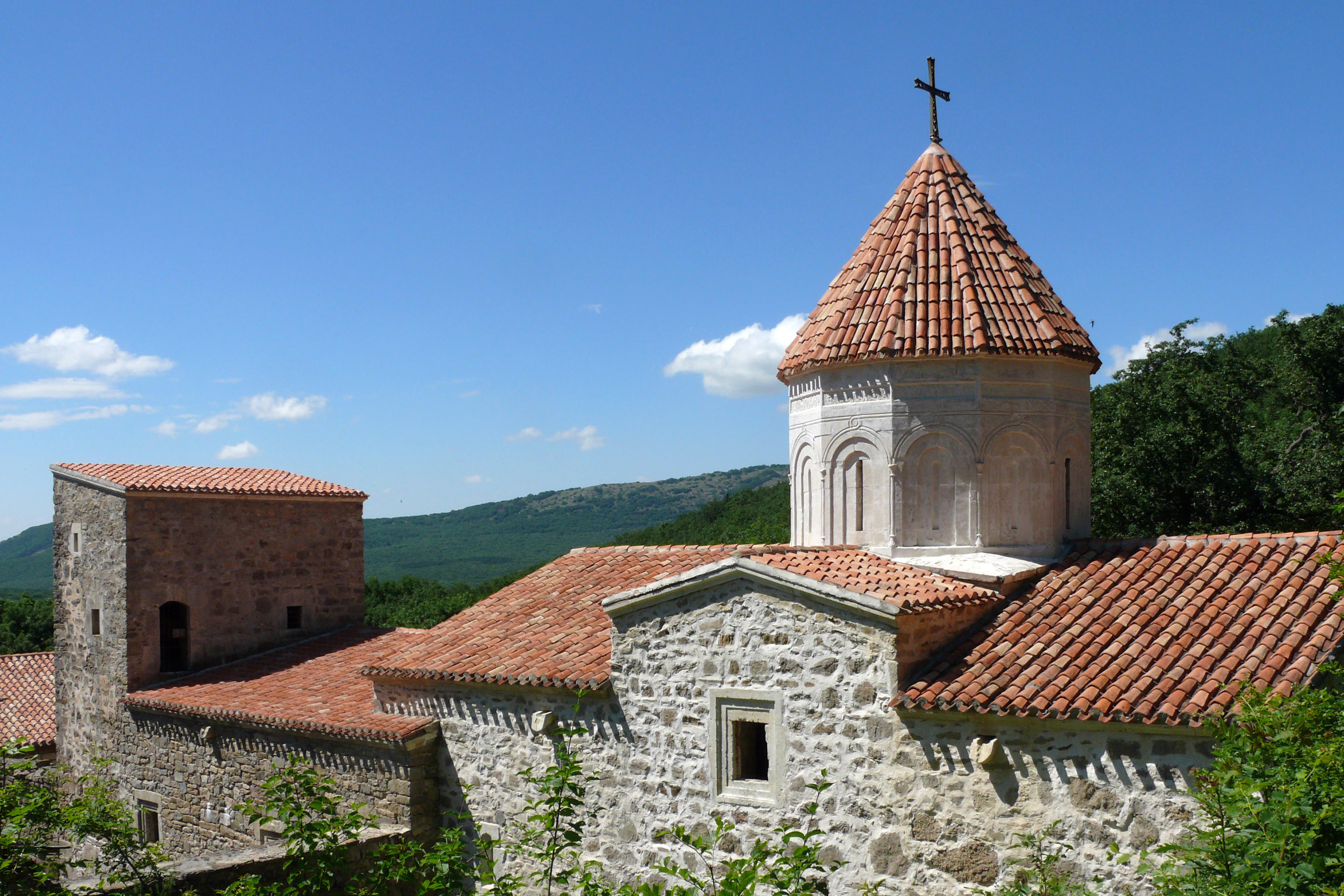

- Location within Ukraine

Religion
- Affiliation: Armenian Apostolic Church
- District: Feodosia district
- Region: Autonomous Republic of Crimea
- Year consecrated: 1358
- Status: active

Location
- Location: Staryi Krym, Crimea, Ukraine
- Municipality: Staryi Krym municipality
- Coordinates: 45.000708°N 35.062529°E

Architecture
- Style: Armenian
- Completed: 1358

Immovable Monument of National Significance of Ukraine
- Official name: Комплекс монастиря Сурп-Хач (Complex of the Surp Khach Monastery)
- Type: Architecture
- Reference no.: 010070

Surp Khach Monastery (Armenian: Սուրբ Խաչ վանք, Monastery of the Holy Cross) is a medieval Armenian monastery located in the eastern part of Crimea, Ukraine near Staryi Krym and founded in 1358.

Before the USSR nationalized it, this monastery owned 4,000 acres of land, while during the Soviet period it served various functions from Pioneer camp to tuberculosis clinic. It has been an Armenian spiritual center and a place of pilgrimage for centuries.

The central bank of Russia issued a silver coin dedicated to Surp Khach Monastery in 2017.

== Gallery ==
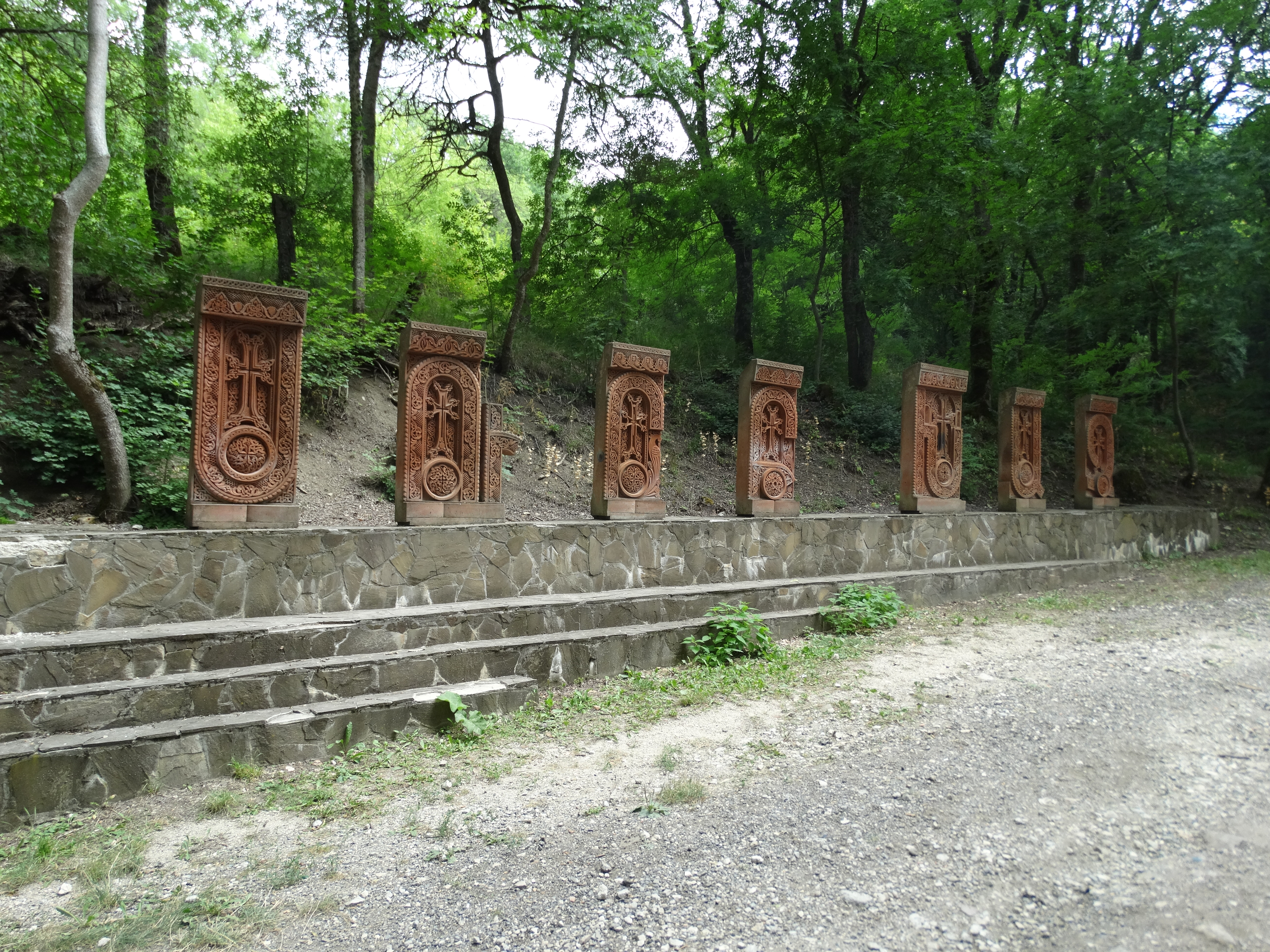

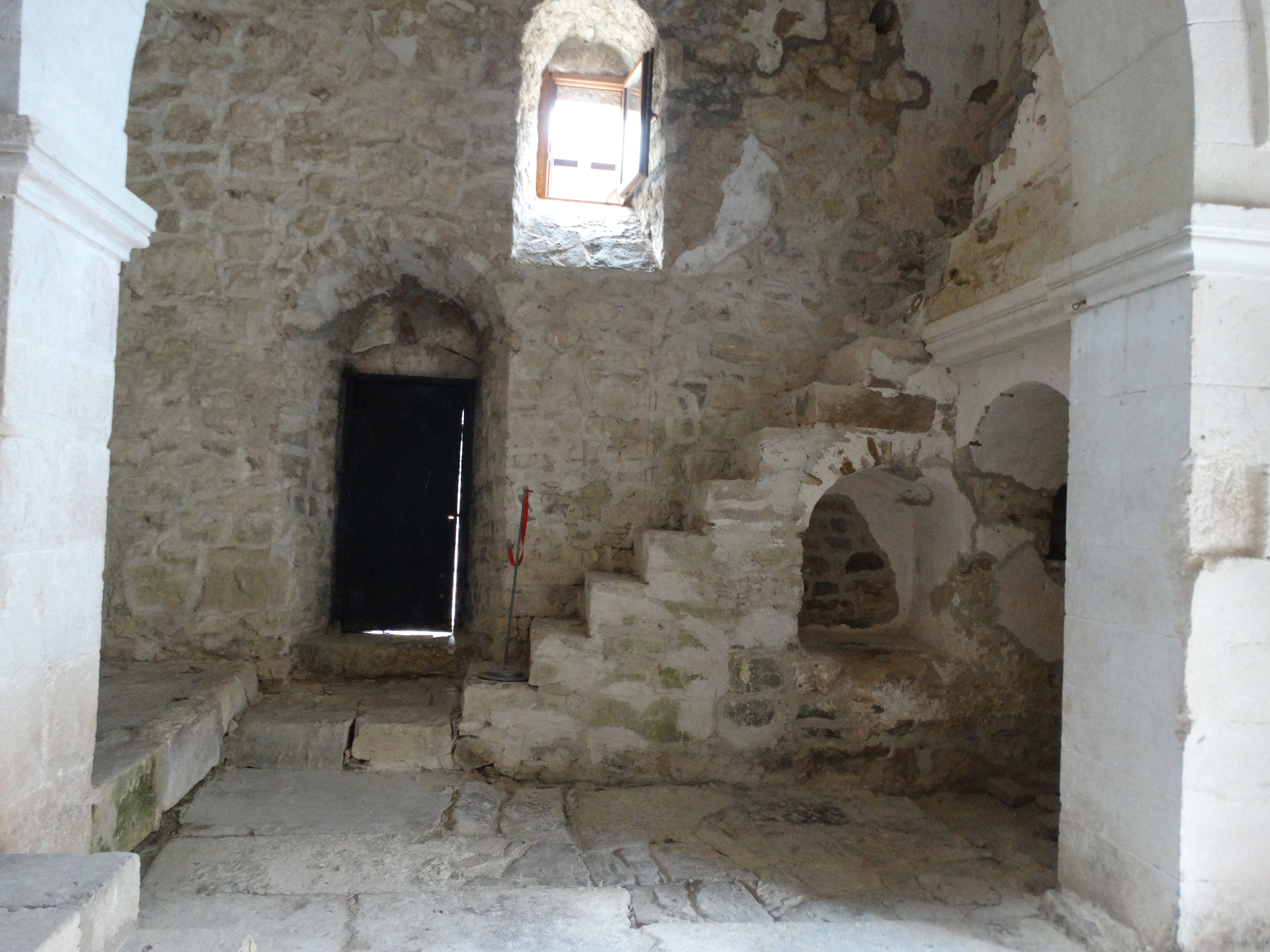

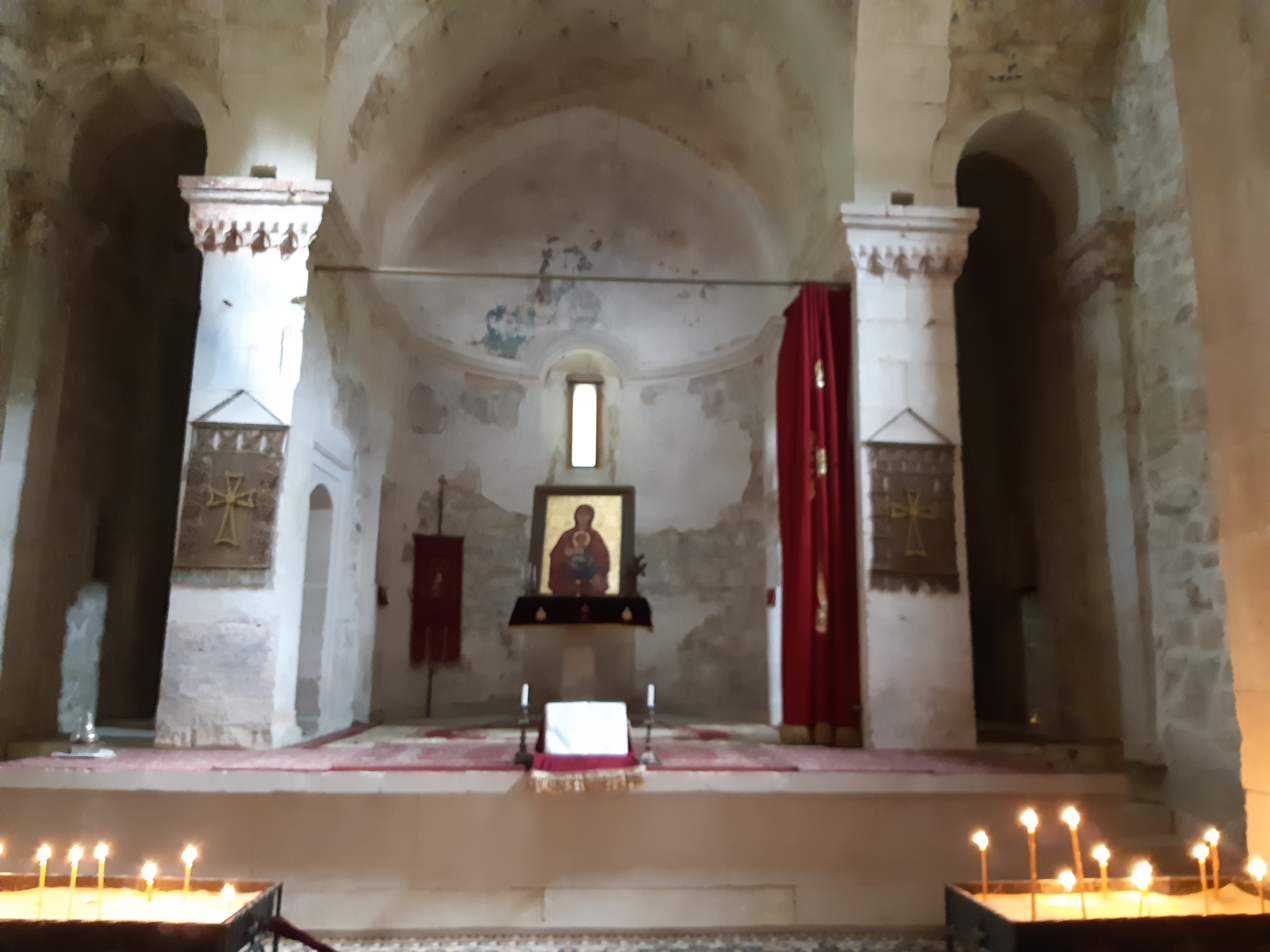

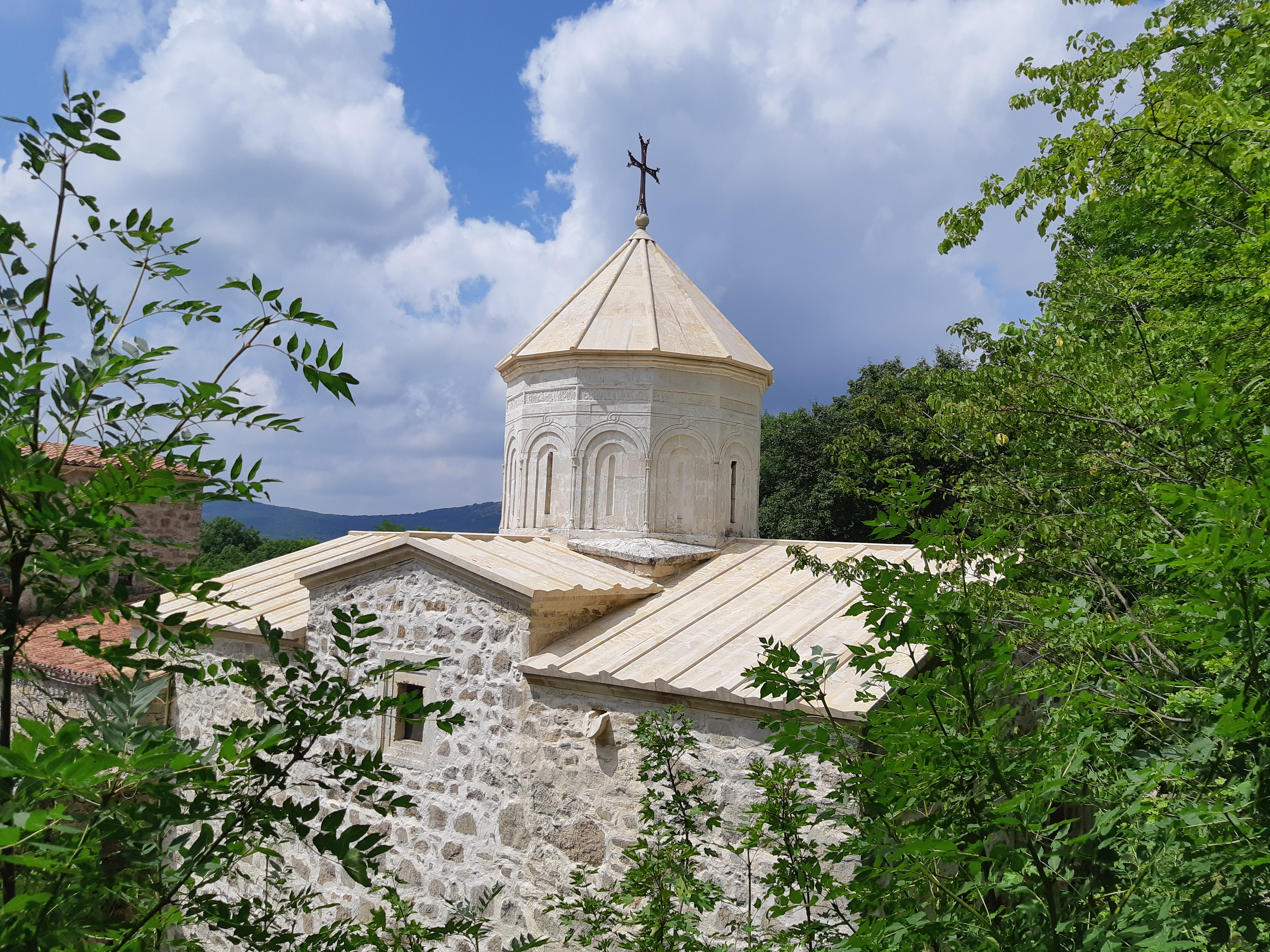

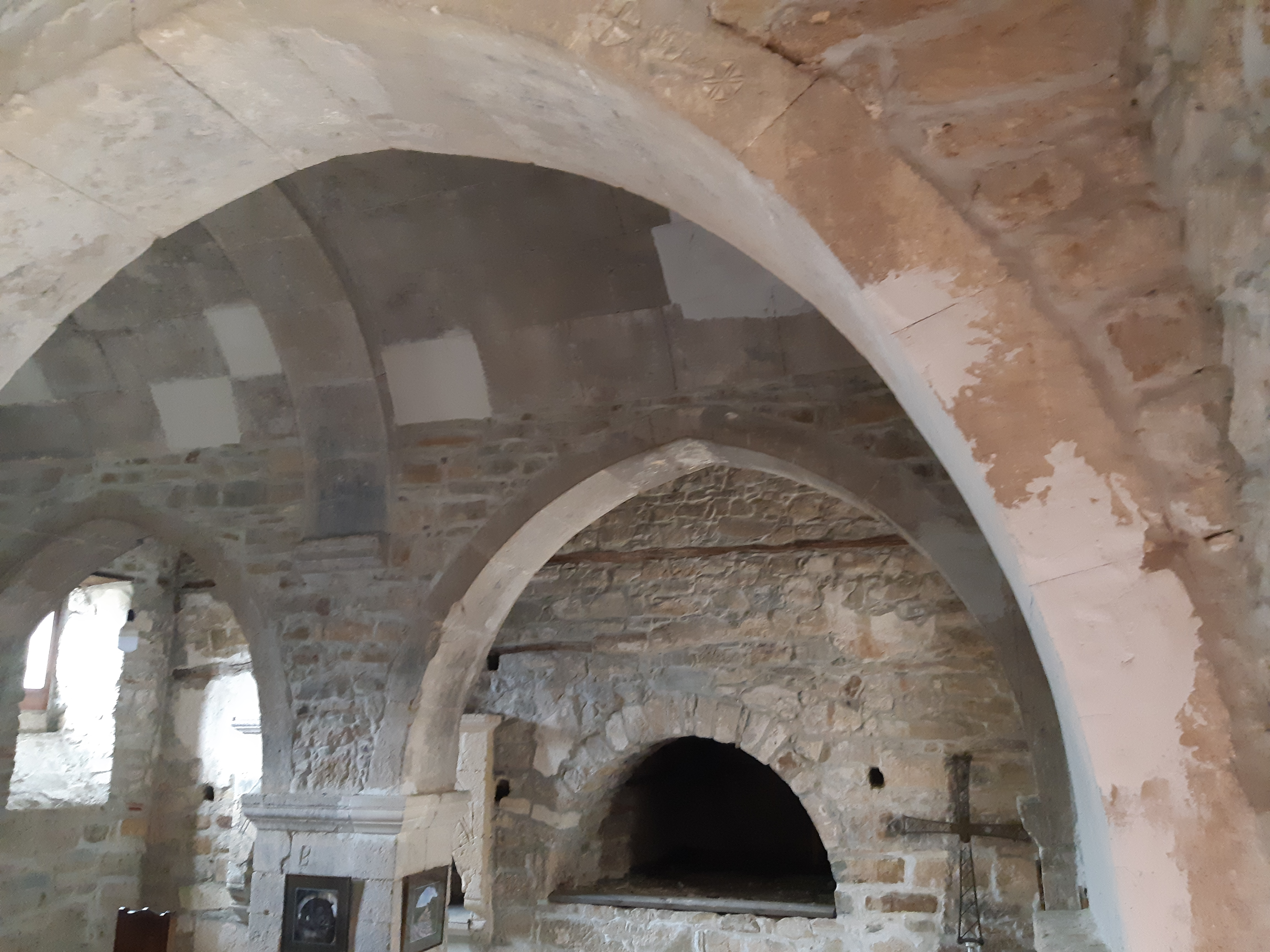

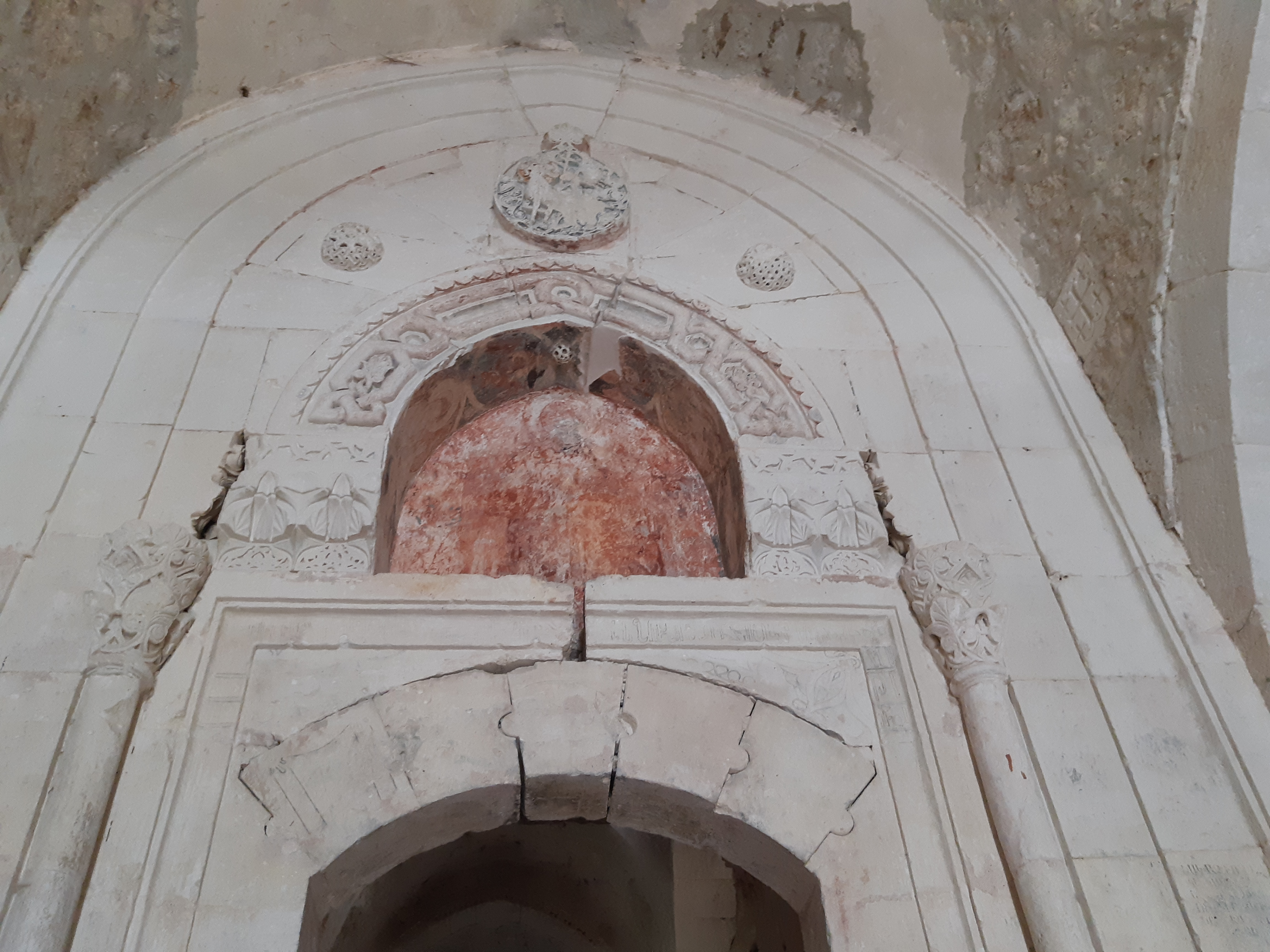

== See also ==
- Armenian Cathedral of the Holy Cross, bearing the same name
