= Wolff Kostakowsky =

Klezmer violinist and publisher of sheet music

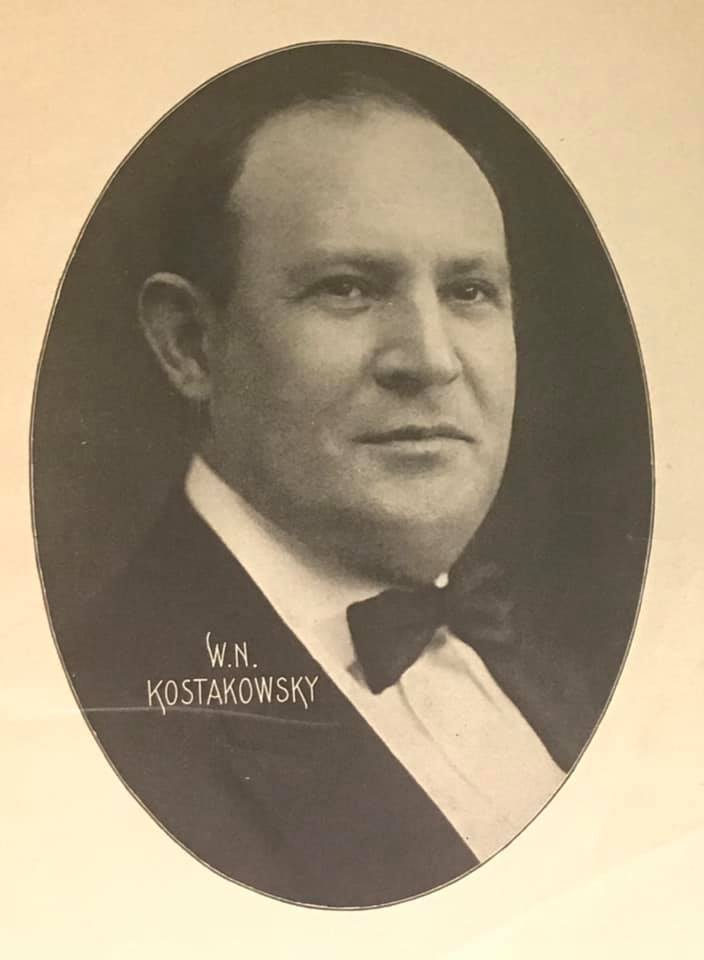
Wolff N. Kostakowsky, klezmer violinist

Wolff N. Kostakowsky (1879–1944) was a Russian-born Jewish American klezmer violinist known mostly for his publication of a book of klezmer dance tunes titled International Hebrew Wedding Music, published in New York City in 1916. That book was one of the earliest collections of klezmer repertoire published in the United States.

== Biography ==
Kostakowsky was born on June 11, 1879, in Feodosia, Crimea, Russian Empire. His father was named Nathan Kostakowsky and his mother was Mary (née Leibowitz). Wolff emigrated to the United States in 1892, sailing from Lyon in December and arriving in New York City later that month. He married his wife Ida (née Shapiro) in Manhattan in June 1896. It seems that his parents followed him to America; although his father died in New York in 1901, his mother was listed as still living with Wolff and his family in the 1910 census.

In the 1900 census he was listed as a Musician living in Atlantic City, New Jersey. In 1908 he was working as a master violin instructor at the New York School of Music and Arts on West 97th Street.

In the 1910s, aside from his only full-length work International Hebrew Wedding Music (1916), Kostakowsky arranged and printed a handful of shorter piano scores of Jewish or other Eastern European music. These included Palestiner March, Sher, and Free Russia March (all published with Sam Bederson music in 1918).

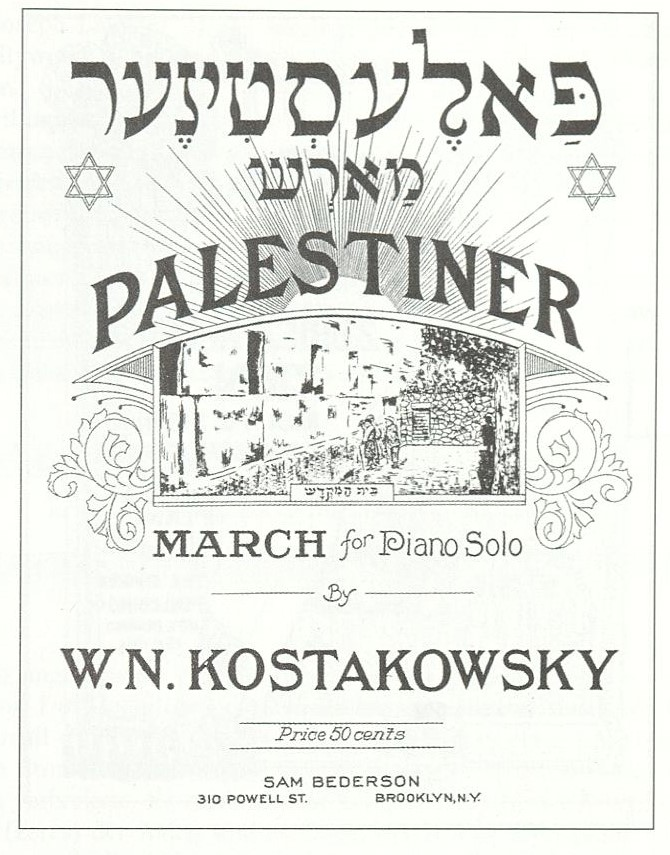
Wolf Kostakowsky Palestiner March 1918

Little is known about the rest of his music career. Kostakowsky died on October 6, 1944, at age 69.

== International Hebrew Wedding Music (1916) ==
Kostakowsky is mainly remembered today for his 1916 publication International Hebrew Wedding Music, a large collection of violin lead sheets published by his Nat Kostakowsky. It is one of the only commercially-published large collections of klezmer tunes from its era; some others include European Jewish Wedding publisher by Herman S. Shapiro in 1902 and the Kammen International Dance Folio series published by the Kammen Brothers from the 1920s onwards. Among those handful of publications, the Kammen books were by far the most well-known and widely distributed.

The klezmer researcher Walter Zev Feldman describes International Hebrew Wedding Music as the "earliest substantial American printed collection of klezmer music" with a particularly Romanian repertoire (notably Bulgars and Sirbas). He described its contents as such: "He divided the substance of his book between a klezmer dance repertoire (i.e., “Rumanian” hora, sirba, and bulgar), followed by hongas and a large group of freylekhs. The remainder of the book is comprised of various non- Jewish dance forms, such as csardas, tarantella, polka, mazurka, “Russian” selections, and waltzes. [...] The book closes with several Zionist songs and assorted American wedding staples, such as the Lohengrin march."

The book was not as widely circulated as the Kammen klezmer folios, but it was nonetheless still circulating in the 1970s at the beginning of the klezmer revival. A copy made its way into the hands of the musicians in The Klezmorim in 1977. Since then, melodies from the book have been performed by many other revival musicians, including Giora Feidman, Veretski Pass, Khevrisa, Yale Strom, and others.

Out of print for most of the twentieth century, the book was finally republished in a new edition by Tara Publications in 2001, with editing and annotation by Joshua Horowitz. However, it is currently once again out of print.
