= Feodosia =

Port town in Crimea

Feodosia Ukrainian: Феодосія, Теодосія Russian: Феодосия Crimean Tatar: Kefe کفه
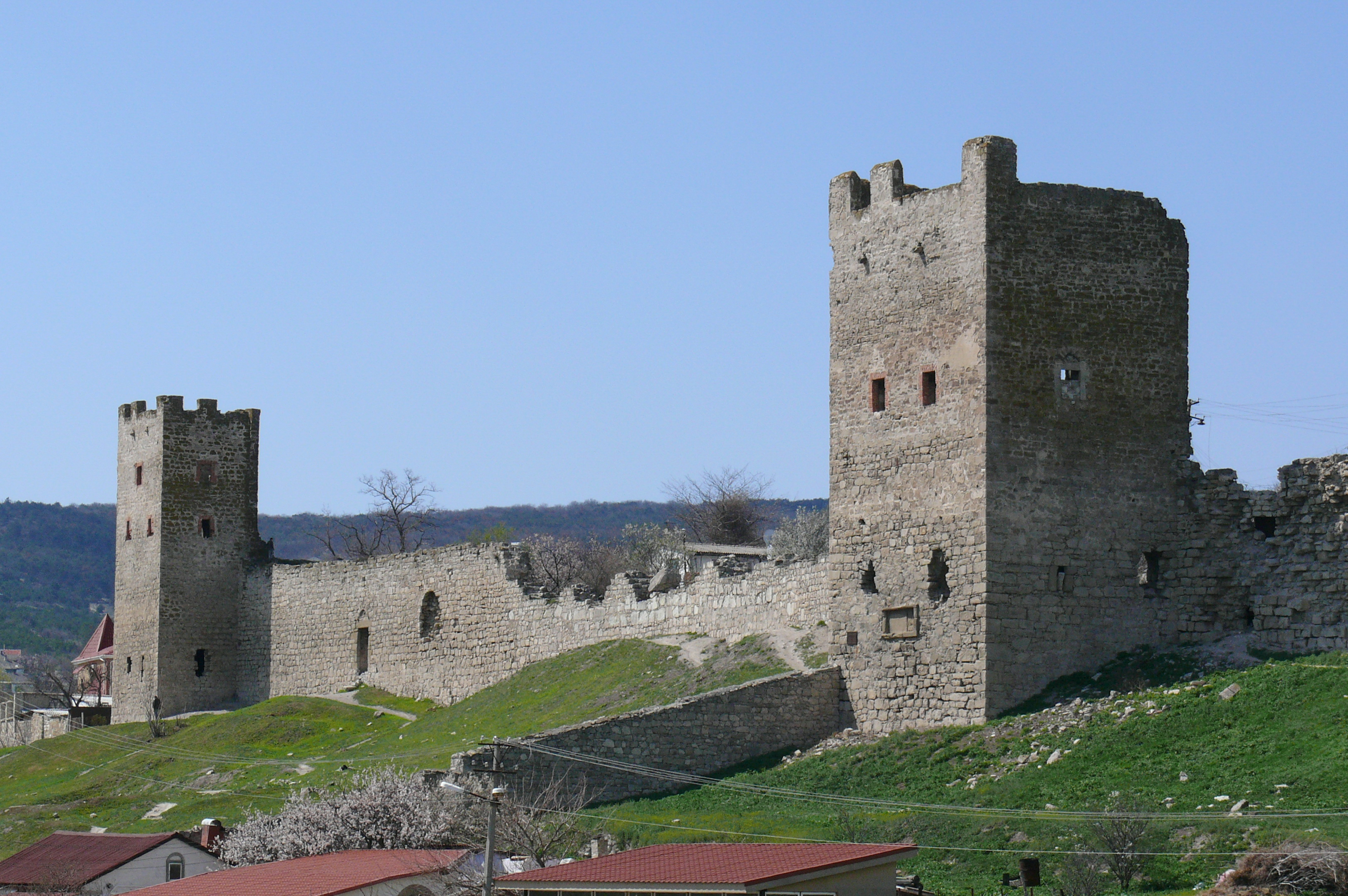
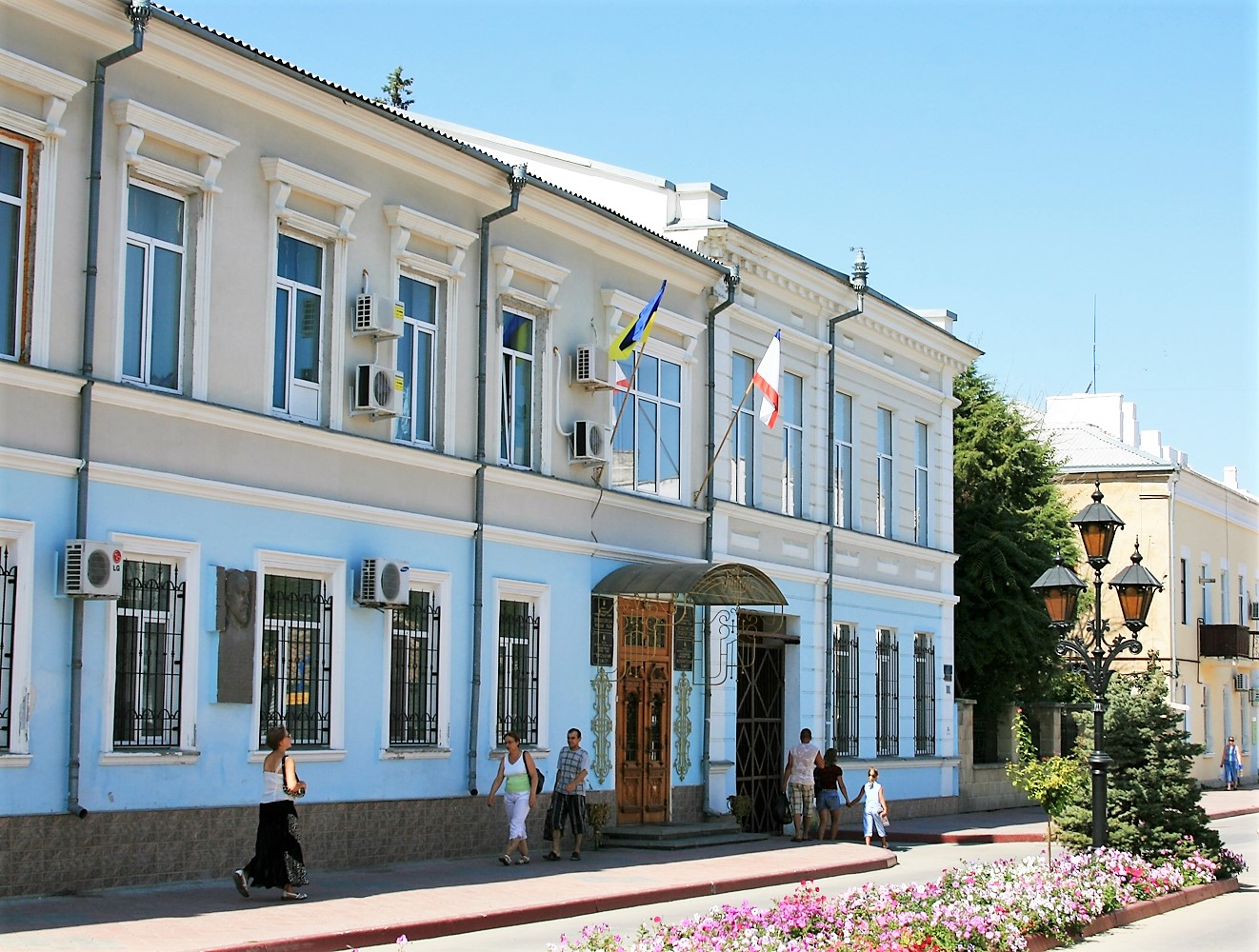
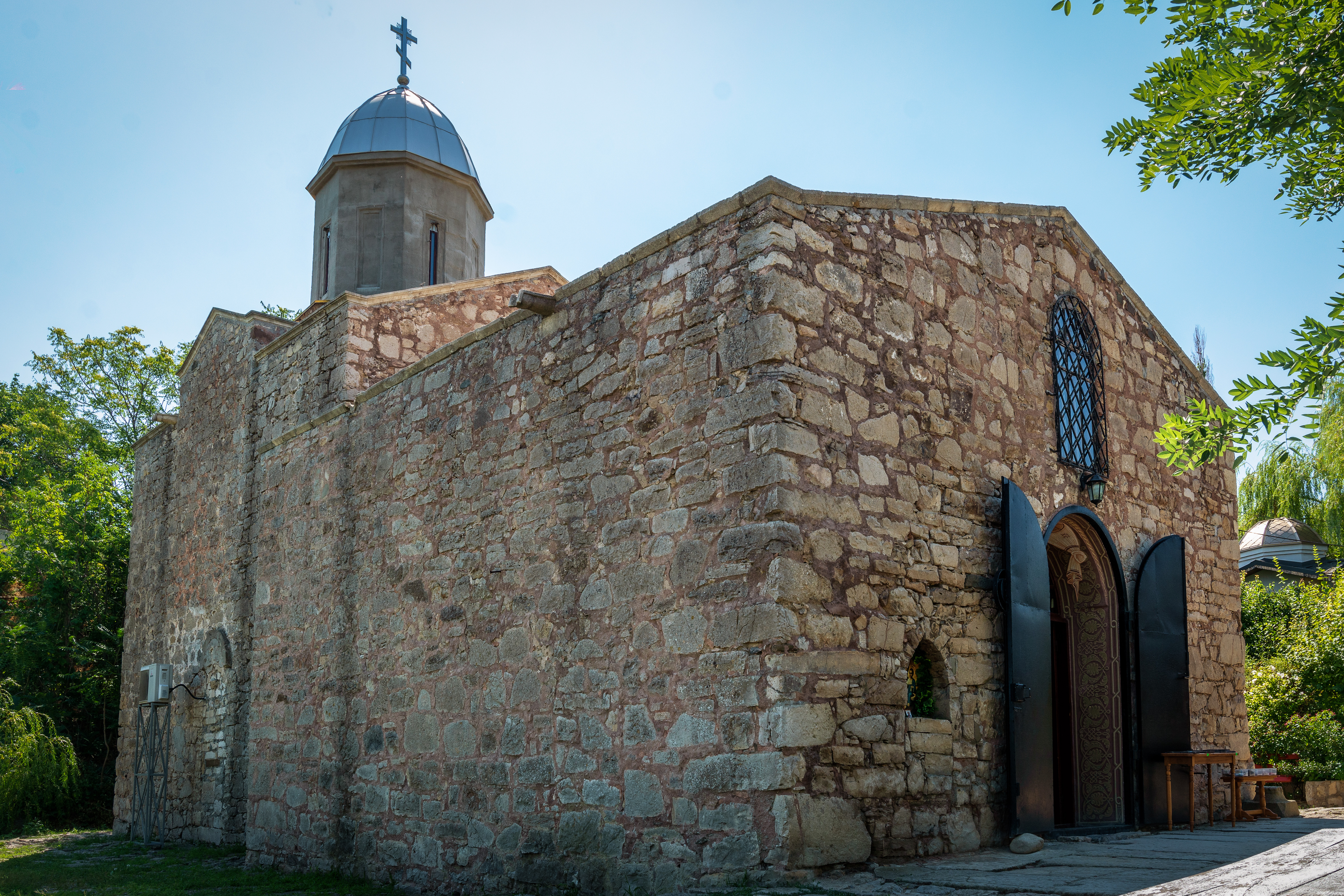
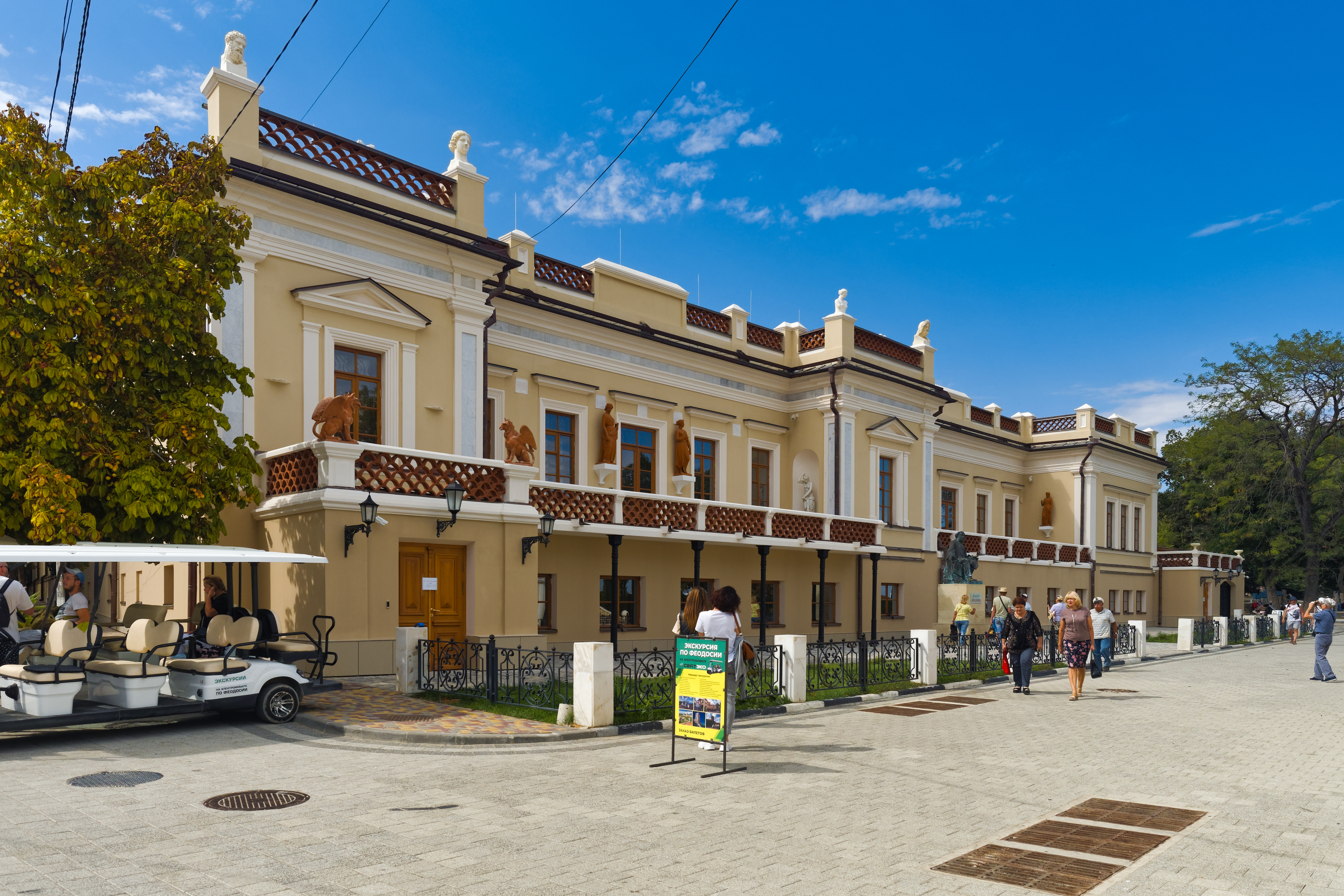
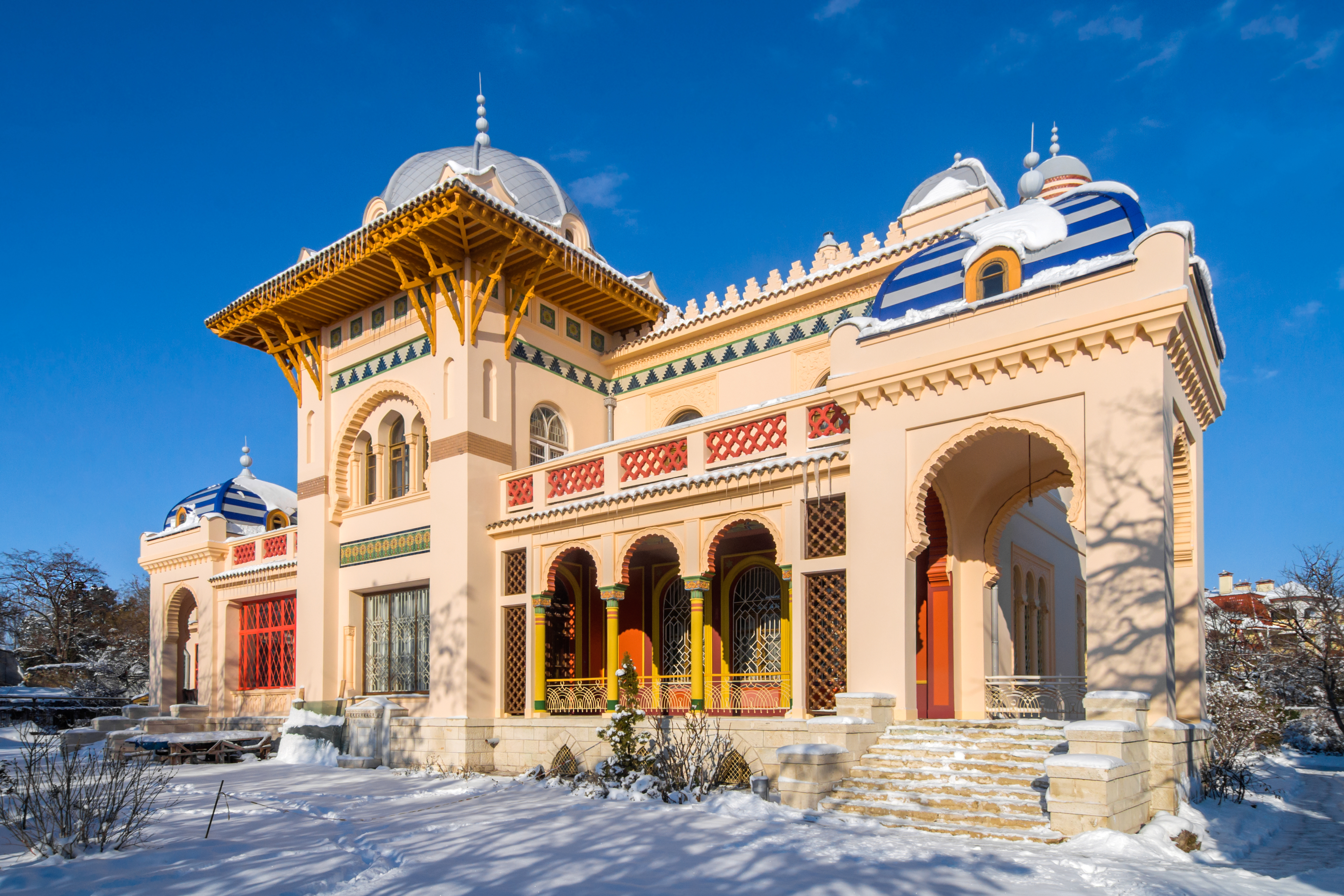
- Genoese fortress of Caffa City council Saint John the Baptist church Art Gallery Dacha Stamboli

- Flag Coat of arms
- Interactive map of Feodosia
- Location of Feodosia within Crimea
- Coordinates: 45°02′03″N 35°22′45″E
- Country (de facto): Russia
- Federal Subject (Republic) (de facto): Crimea
- Municipality (de facto): Feodosia
- Country (de jure): Ukraine
- Autonomous republic (de jure): Crimea
- Raion (de jure): Feodosia

Government
  - Head of administration: Vladimir Kim (de-facto)
- Elevation: 50 m (160 ft)

Population (2015)
  - Total: 69,145
- Time zone: UTC+3 (MSK)
- Postal codes: 298100–298175
- Area code: +7-36562
- Former names: Kefe (until 1784), Caffa (until the 15th century)
- Climate: Cfa
- Website: feo.rk.gov.ru

Feodosia (Ukrainian: Феодосія, Теодосія, Feodosiia, Teodosiia; Russian: Феодосия, tr. Feodosiya), also called in English Theodosia (from Greek: Θεοδοσία), is a city on the Crimean coast of the Black Sea. Feodosia serves as the administrative center of Feodosia Municipality, one of the regions into which Crimea is divided. During much of its history, the city was a significant settlement known as Caffa (Ligurian: Cafà) or Kaffa (Old Crimean Tatar/Ottoman Turkish: کفه; Crimean Tatar/Turkish: Kefe). According to the 2014 census, its population was 69,145.

== History ==
=== Theodosia (Greek colony) ===
Theodosia and other Greek colonies along the north coast of the Black Sea from the 8th to the 3rd century BC

The city was founded as Theodosia (Θεοδοσία) by Greek colonists from Miletos in the 6th century BC. Noted for its rich agricultural lands, on which its trade depended, the city was destroyed by the Huns in the 4th century AD.

Theodosia remained a minor village for much of the next nine hundred years. It was at times part of the sphere of influence of the Khazars (excavations have revealed Khazar artifacts dating back to the 9th century) and of the Byzantine Empire.

Like the rest of Crimea, this place (village) fell under the domination of the Kipchaks and was conquered by the Mongols in the 1230s.

A settlement named Kaphâs (alternate romanized spelling Cafâs, Greek: Καφᾶς) existed surrounding Theodosia prior to the penetration of Genoese into the Black Sea. The archaeological evidence indicates that during the Middle Ages the population about Theodosia never decreased to zero; several medieval churches are found in the area dating from the times of Late Antiquity/Early Middle Ages. However, the population had become completely agrarian. A small local Greek population must have existed in situ and in the neighboring settlements. Likely, from the 9th century there were Cumans and Goths living alongside the Greeks, and by 1270s, perhaps some Tatars and Armenians as well.

=== Kaffa (Genoese colony) ===
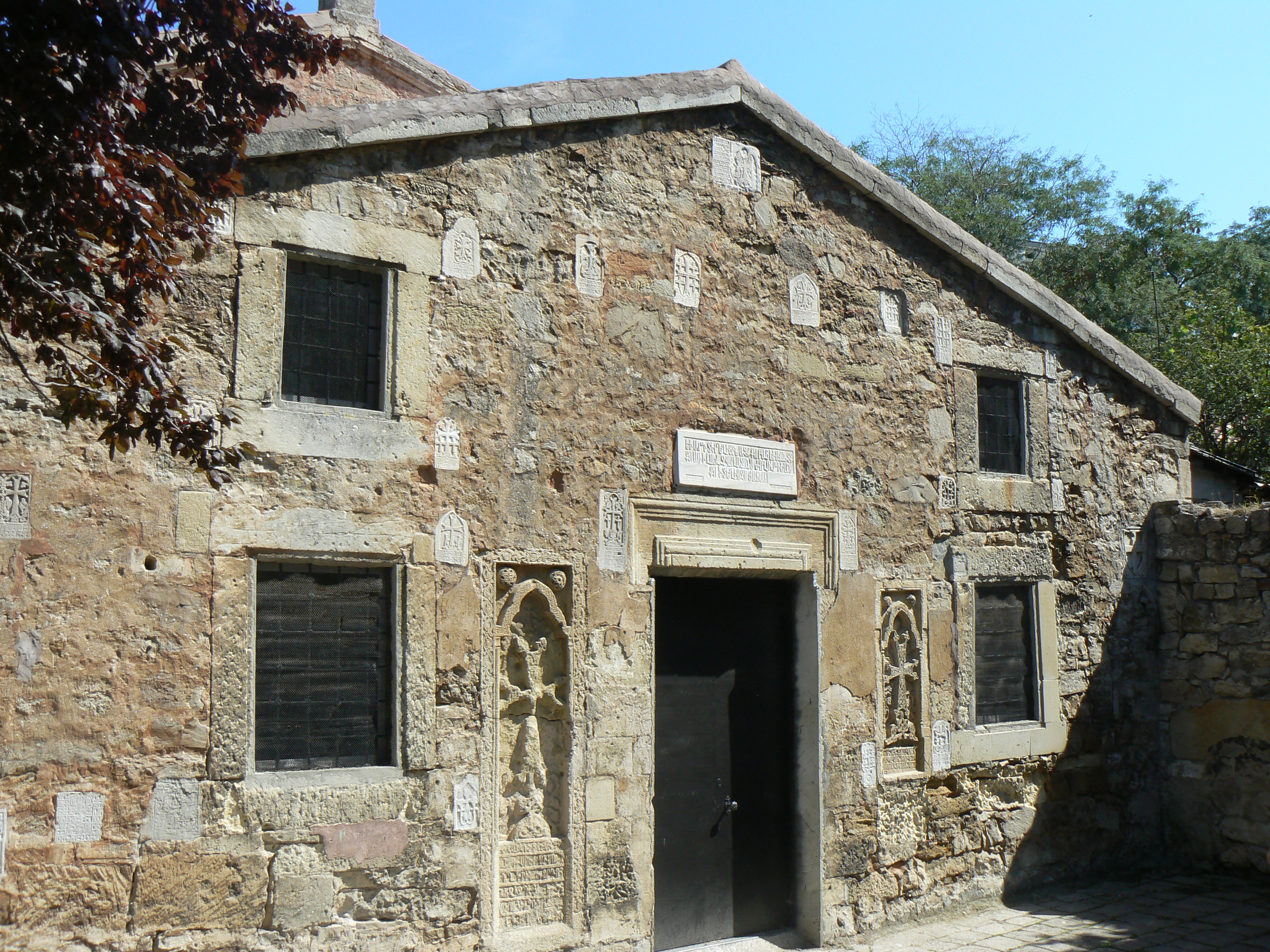
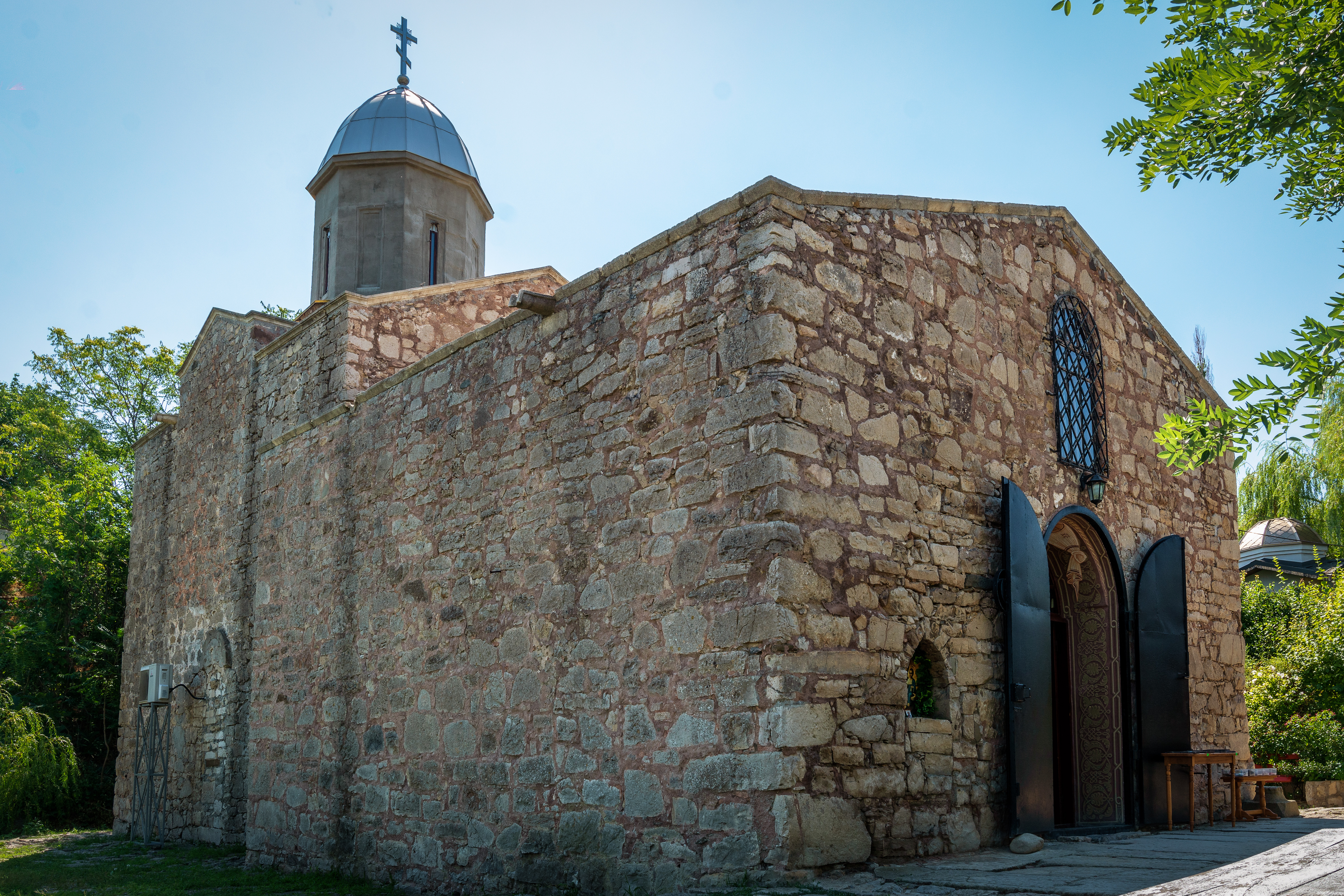
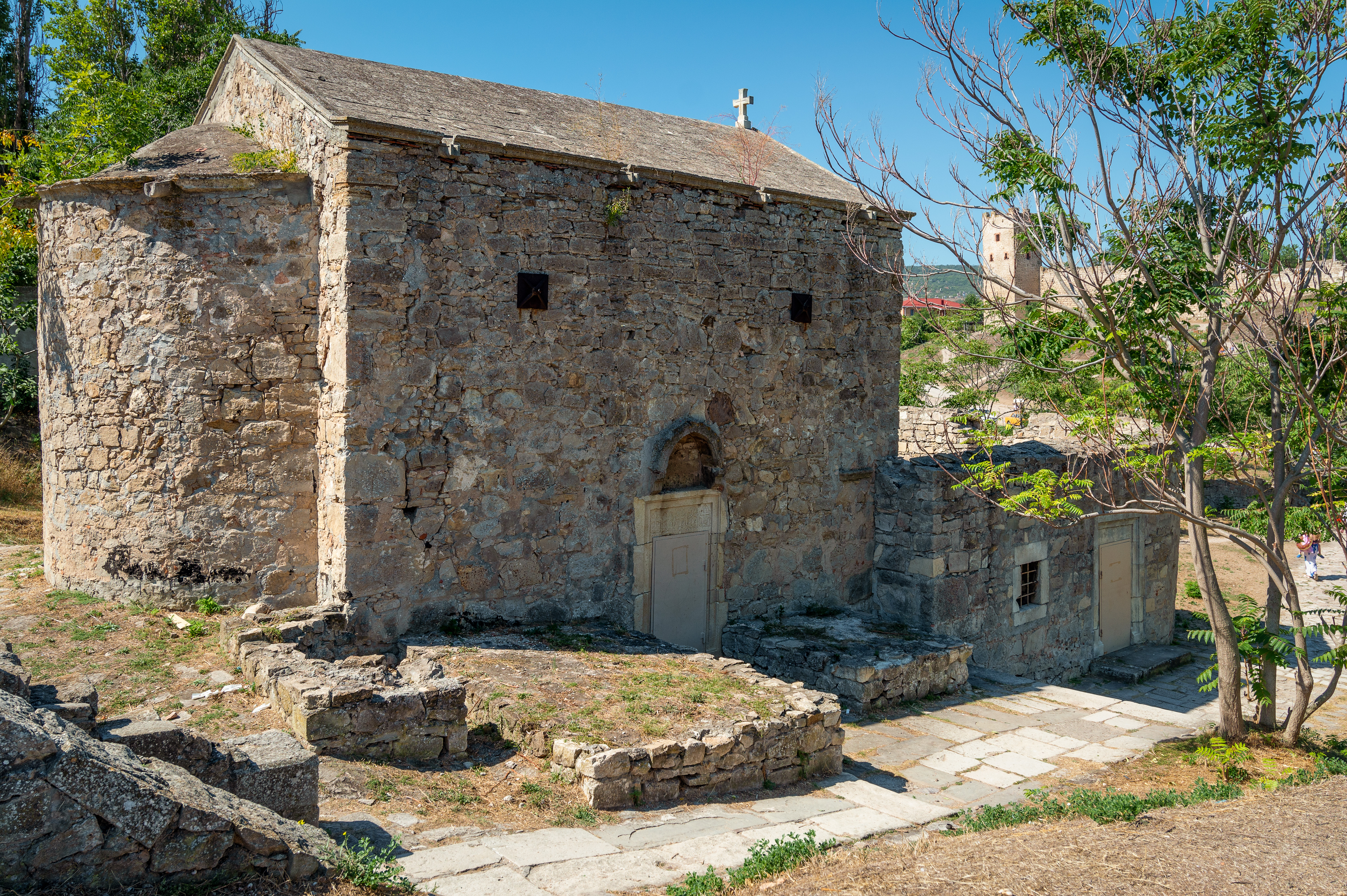
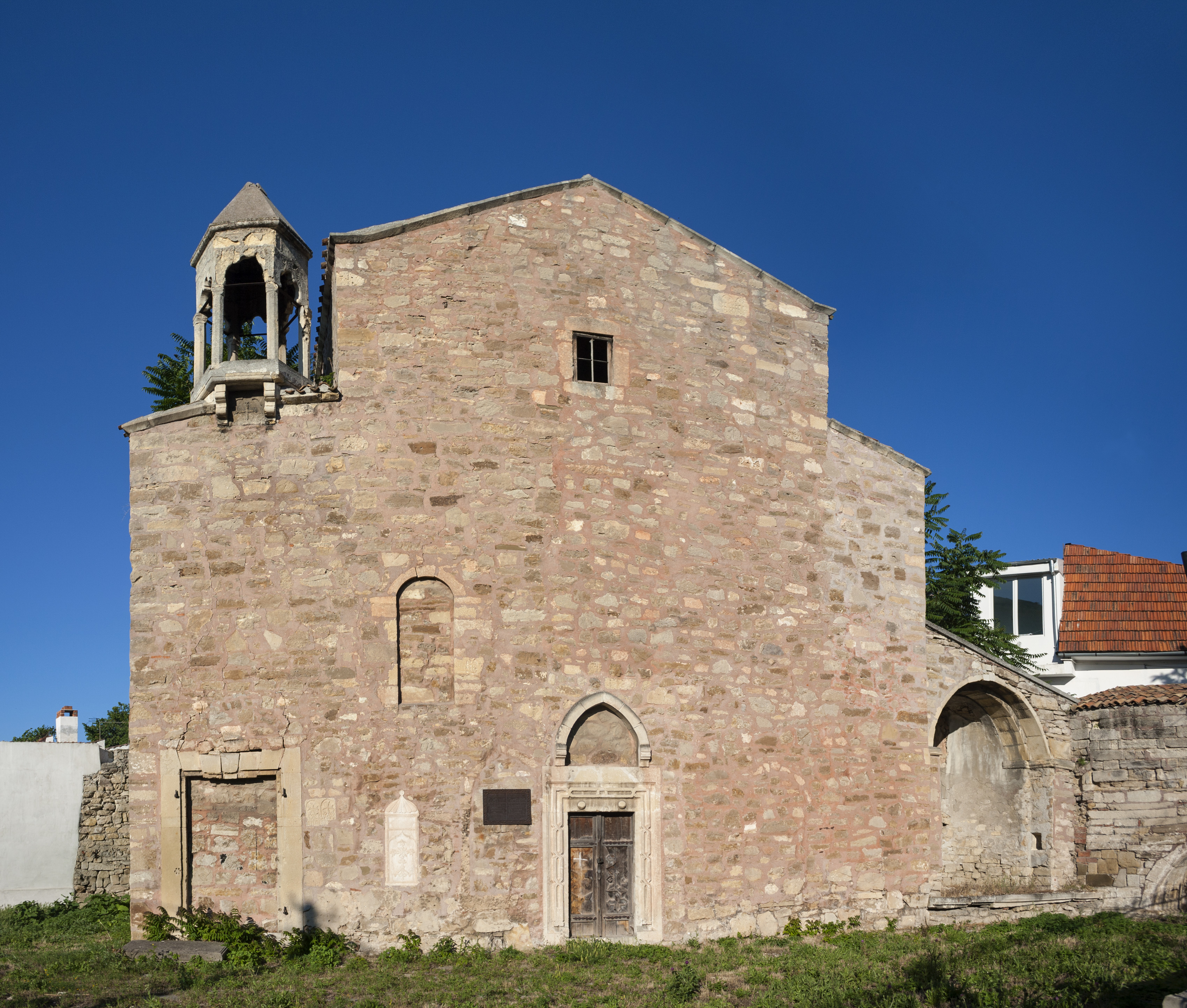
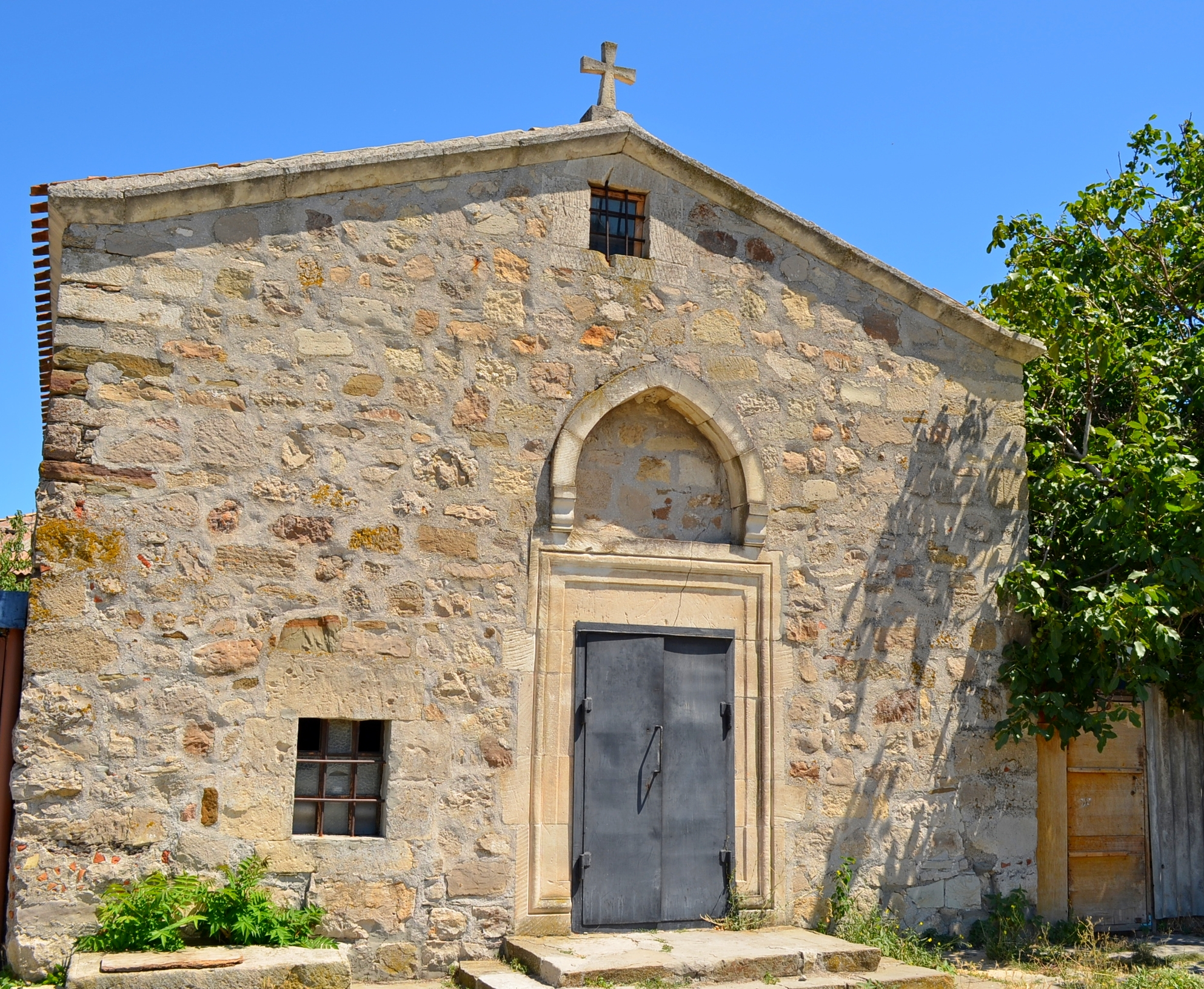
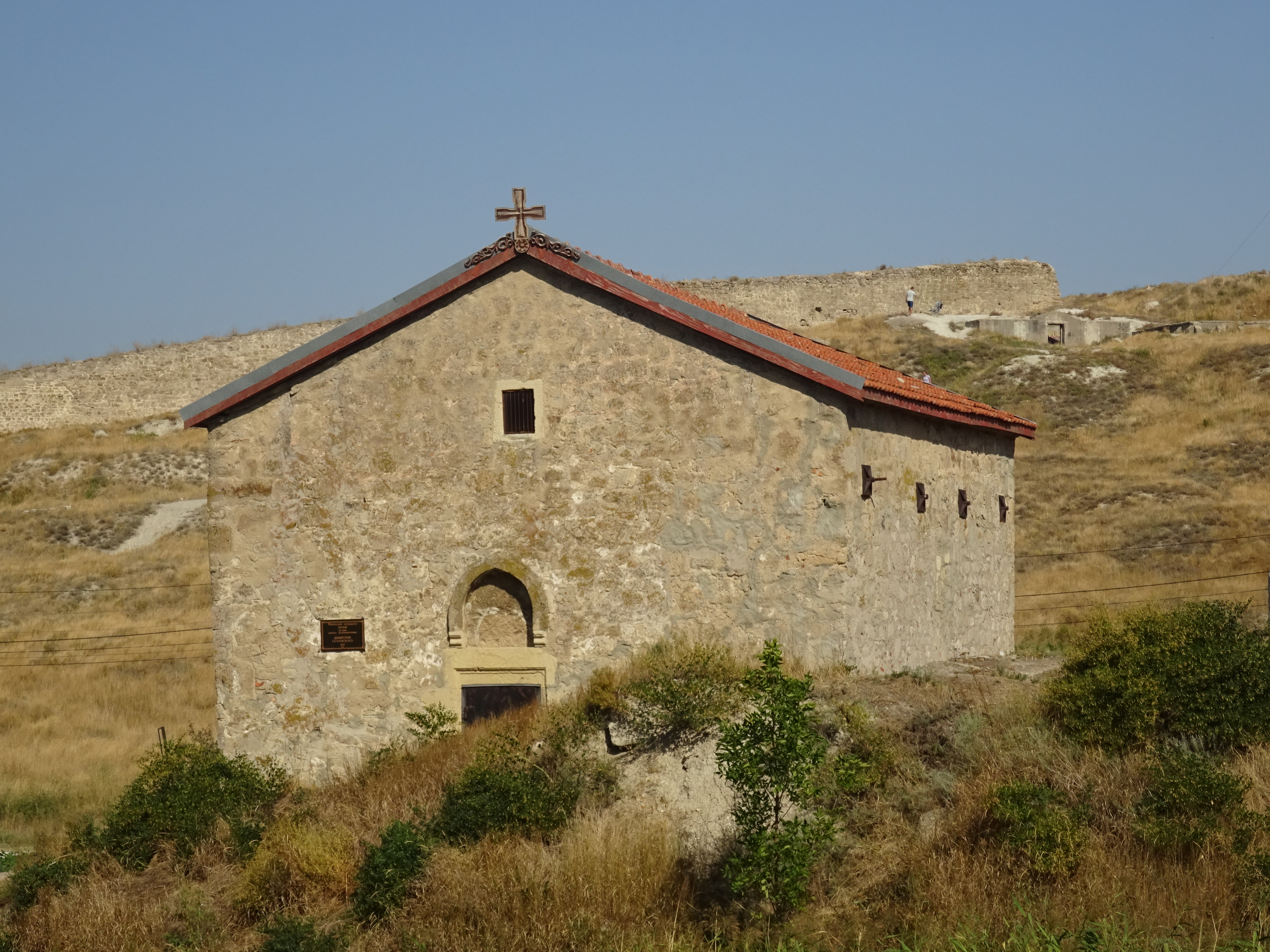
Medieval churches of Kaffa: Armenian Orthodox (top row), Armenian Catholic (middle row) and Greek Orthodox (bottom row)

In the late 13th century, traders from the Republic of Genoa arrived and purchased the city from the ruling Golden Horde.

They established a flourishing trading settlement called Kaffa (also recorded as Caffa), which virtually monopolized trade in the Black Sea region and served as a major port and administrative center for the Genoese settlements around the Sea. The city thrived despite the tenuous politics of the region and Genoa's series of wars with the Mongol successor states.

It came to house one of Europe's biggest slave markets of the Black Sea slave trade, and served as a terminus for the Silk Road. The Great Soviet Encyclopedia also adds that the city of Caffa was established during the times when the area was ruled by the Khan of the Golden Horde Mengu-Timur.

Ibn Battuta visited the city, noting it was a "great city along the sea coast inhabited by Christians, most of them Genoese." He further stated, "We went down to its port, where we saw a wonderful harbor with about two hundred vessels in it, both ships of war and trading vessels, small and large, for it is one of the world's celebrated ports."

In early 1318, Pope John XXII established a Latin Church diocese of Kaffa, as a suffragan of Genoa. The papal bull of appointment of the first bishop attributed to him a vast territory: "a villa de Varna in Bulgaria usque Sarey inclusive in longitudinem et a mari Pontico usque ad terram Ruthenorum in latitudinem" ("from the city of Varna in Bulgaria to Sarey inclusive in longitude, and from the Black Sea to the land of the Ruthenians in latitude"). The first bishop was Fra' Gerolamo, who had already been consecrated seven years before as a missionary bishop ad partes Tartarorum. The diocese ended as a residential bishopric with the capture of the city by the Ottomans in 1475. Accordingly, Kaffa is today listed by the Catholic Church as a titular see. The new diocese effectively broke up the diocese of Khanbaliq, which functioned as one diocese for all Mongol territory from the Balkans to China.

Feodosia and territorial demarcations in the 15th century

It is believed that the devastating pandemic of the Black Death entered Europe for the first time via Kaffa in 1347. After a protracted siege, the Mongol army under Jani Beg was reportedly withering from the disease and catapulted infected corpses over the city walls, infecting the inhabitants. This is considered one of the first cases of biological warfare. Fleeing inhabitants may have carried the disease back to Italy, causing its spread across Europe. However, the plague appears to have spread in a stepwise fashion, taking over a year to reach Europe from Crimea. Also, there were a number of Crimean ports under Mongol control, so it is unlikely that Kaffa was the only source of plague-infested ships heading to Europe. Additionally, there were overland caravan routes from the East that would have been carrying the disease into Europe as well.

Kaffa eventually recovered. Among visiting merchants in Kaffa at the time were Italians, Poles, Vlachs, Lithuanians, Greeks, Armenians, Persians and Russians. The thriving, culturally diverse city and its thronged slave market have been described by the Spanish traveler Pedro Tafur, who was there in the 1430s. The port was also visited by German traveler Johann Schiltberger in the 15th century.

In addition to trade with Italy, the city developed trade with Poland via the Polish-controlled ports in the Dniester Estuary. Many Polish merchants came to Kaffa and Polish envoys often visited the city, with the Genoese consul of Kaffa stating the Poles and the locals had close and friendly relations. Kaffa had commercial agents in Poland, including one permanently residing in Lwów. Faced with the Ottoman threat, Kaffa sought either to be incorporated into Poland or to form an alliance with Poland. In 1462, Kaffa placed itself under the protectorate of King Casimir IV of Poland. Poland's capacity to provide military assistance was limited, as it was embroiled in the Thirteen Years' War until 1466, however, Polish protectorate prolonged the period of peace and postponed the Ottoman attack. Eventually, Poland did not offer significant help due to reinforcements sent being massacred after a quarrel with locals in Bracław.

=== Kefe (Ottoman) ===
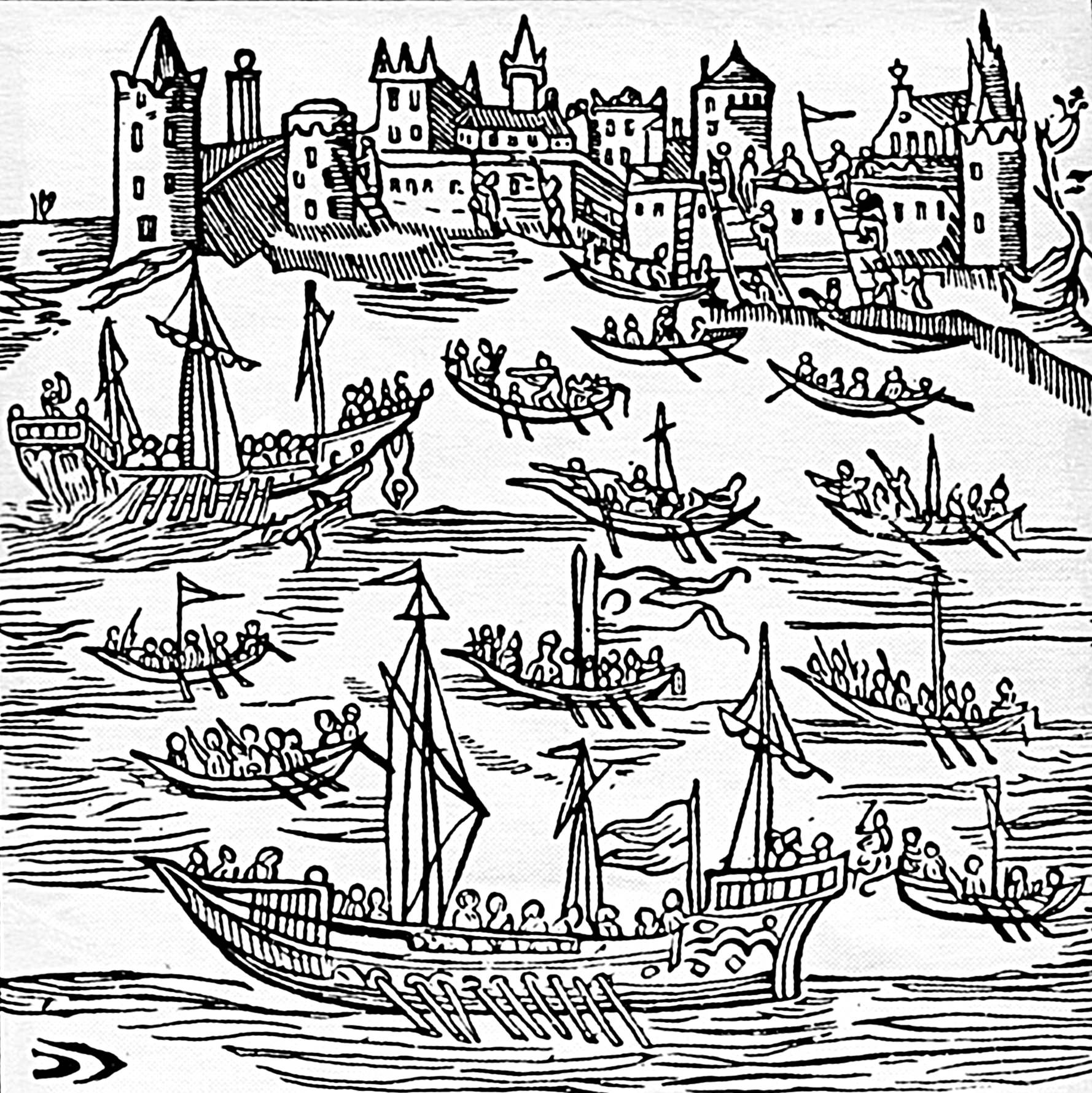
17th-century woodcut showing Zaporozhian Cossacks in "chaika" boats, destroying the Turkish fleet and capturing Caffa

Following the fall of Constantinople, Amasra, and lastly Trebizond, the position of Caffa had become untenable and attracted the attention of Ottoman Sultan Mehmed II. He was at no loss for a pretext to extinguish this last Genoese colony on the Black Sea. In 1473, the tudun (or governor) of the Crimean Khanate died and a fight developed over the appointment of his successor. The Genoese involved themselves in the dispute, and the Tatar notables who favored the losing candidate finally asked Mehmed to settle the dispute.

Mehmed dispatched a fleet under the Ottoman commander Gedik Ahmet Pasha, which left Constantinople 19 May 1475. It anchored before the walls of the city on 1 June, started the bombardment the next day, and on 6 June the inhabitants capitulated. Over the next few days the Ottomans proceeded to extract the wealth of the inhabitants, and abduct 1,500 youths for service in the Sultan's palace. On 8 July, the final blow was struck when all inhabitants of Latin origin were ordered to relocate to Istanbul, where they founded a quarter (Kefeli Mahalle) which was named after the town they had been forced to leave. Some of the educated residents fled to Kyiv, where they became employed as lecturers.

Renamed Kefe, Caffa became one of the most important Turkish ports on the Black Sea. It was a major center of the Crimean slave trade until the late 18th-century, referred to by the Lithuanian Michalo Lituanus as: "not a town, but an abyss into which our blood is pouring". The Catholic Diocese of Kaffa was suppressed, although it remained a titular see. From 1493 to 1664, eight Poles were appointed titular bishops of Kaffa.

Following the Turkish conquest, maritime trade between the West and the East via Kaffa was severed. This led to the development of an alternative land trade route, linking Kaffa via Akkerman, Podolia, Lwów, Kraków and Cieszyn to German states. In 1616, Zaporozhian Cossacks under the leadership of Petro Konashevych-Sahaidachny destroyed the Turkish fleet and captured Caffa. Having conquered the city, the Cossacks released the men, women and children who were slaves.

=== Feodosia (Russian Empire) ===
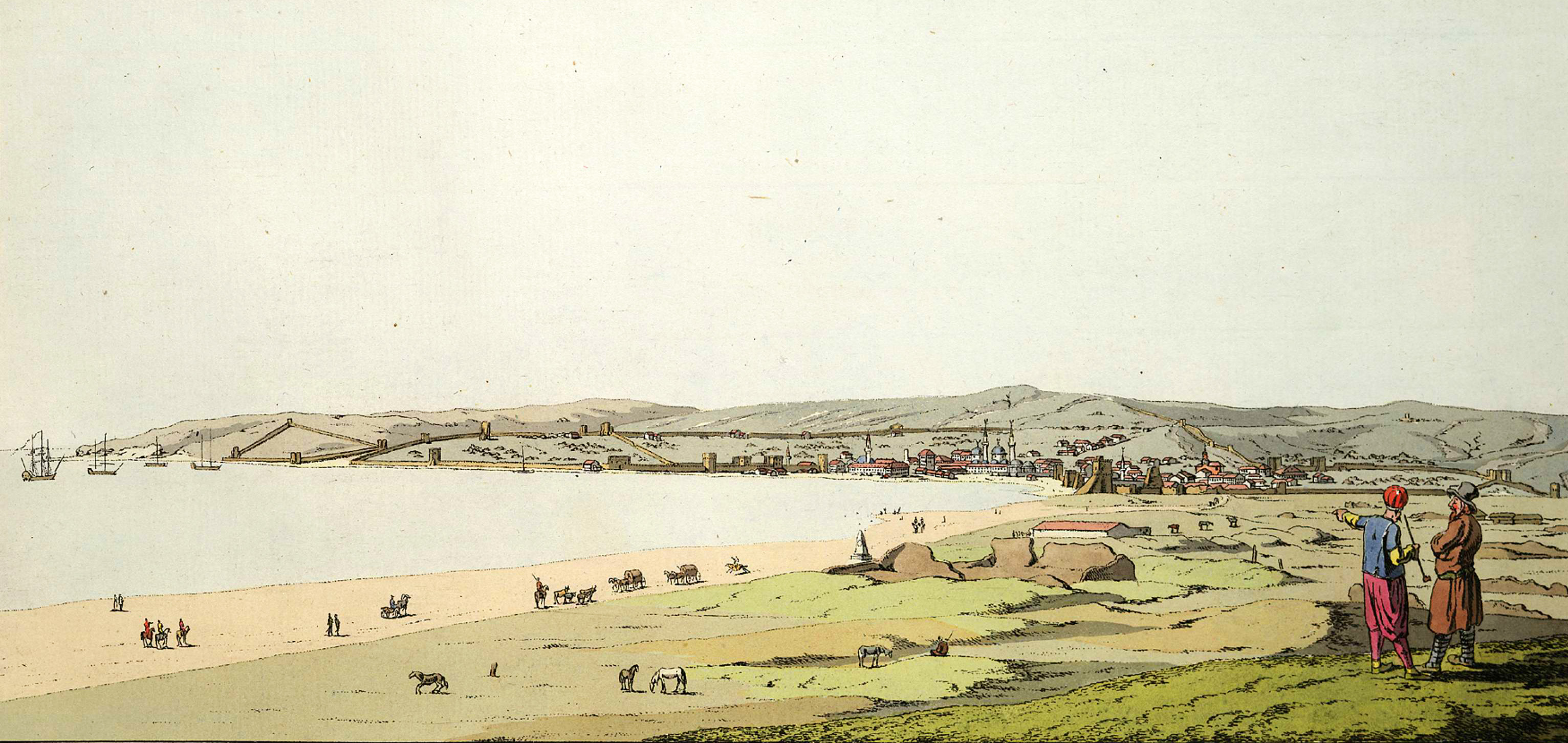
View by C. G. H. Geissler, 1794

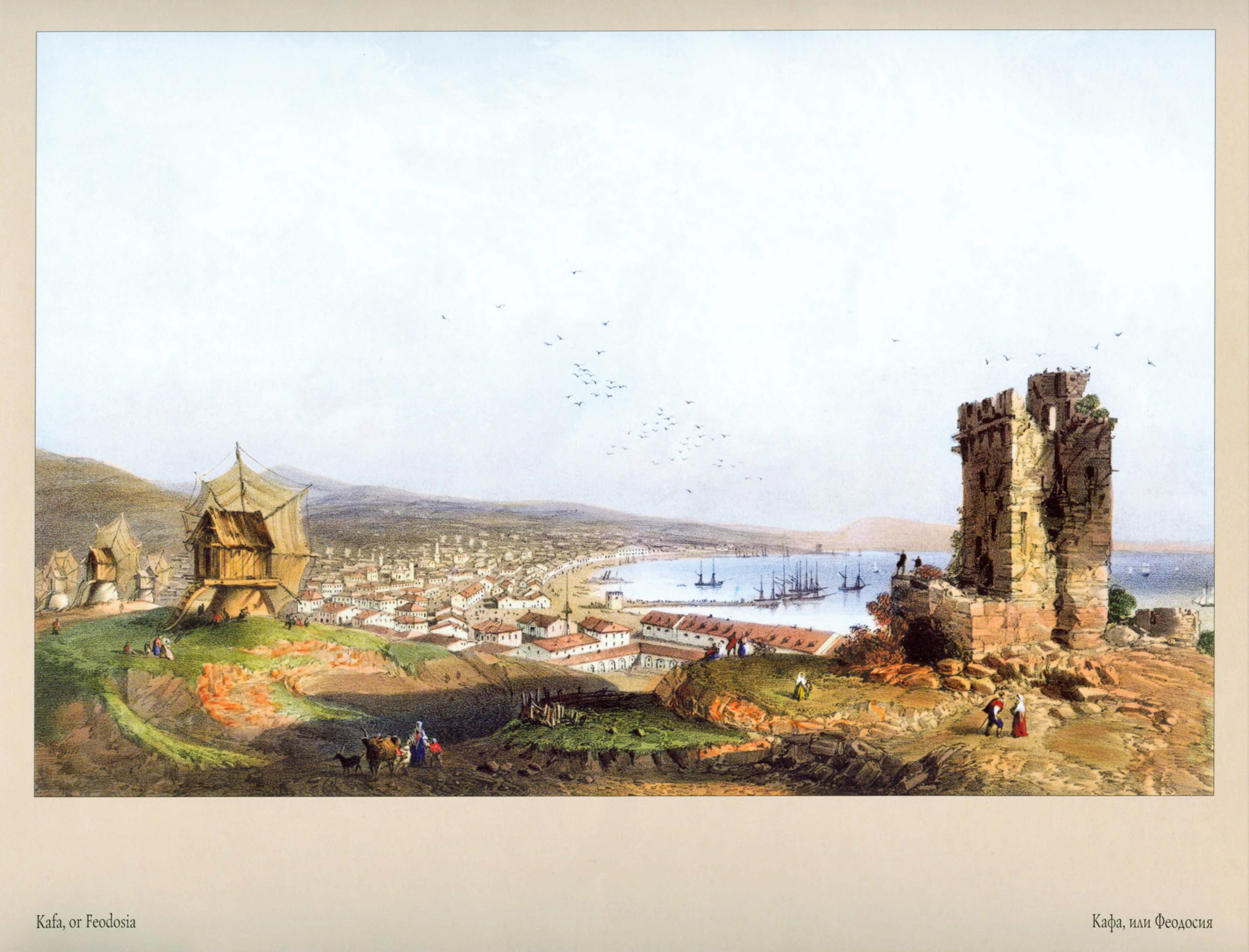
Feodosia, painting by Carlo Bossoli, 1856

Ottoman control ceased when the expanding Russian Empire took over Crimea between 1774 and 1783. It was renamed Feodosia (Russian Ѳеодосія; reformed spelling Феодосия), after the traditional Russian reading of its ancient Greek name.

As of 1874, the population was mostly Eastern Orthodox, whereas 12.3% were Muslim, 8.2% Karaite, 6.5% Armenian Orthodox, 4.8% Jewish, 3.5% Catholic and 1.1% Protestant. In 1880, there were 427 artisans, and their handcrafted goods provided for local needs only, and there were 11 factories.

In 1894, Feodosia was chosen to replace Sevastopol as the chief commercial port of Crimea, which fueled its development. In 1900, Zibold constructed the first air well (dew condenser) on mount Tepe-Oba near Feodosia. The city had several churches, including Eastern Orthodox, Armenian Orthodox and Armenian Catholic (also hosting Polish Catholic services), and Tatar mosques, a synagogue and a Karaite kenesa.

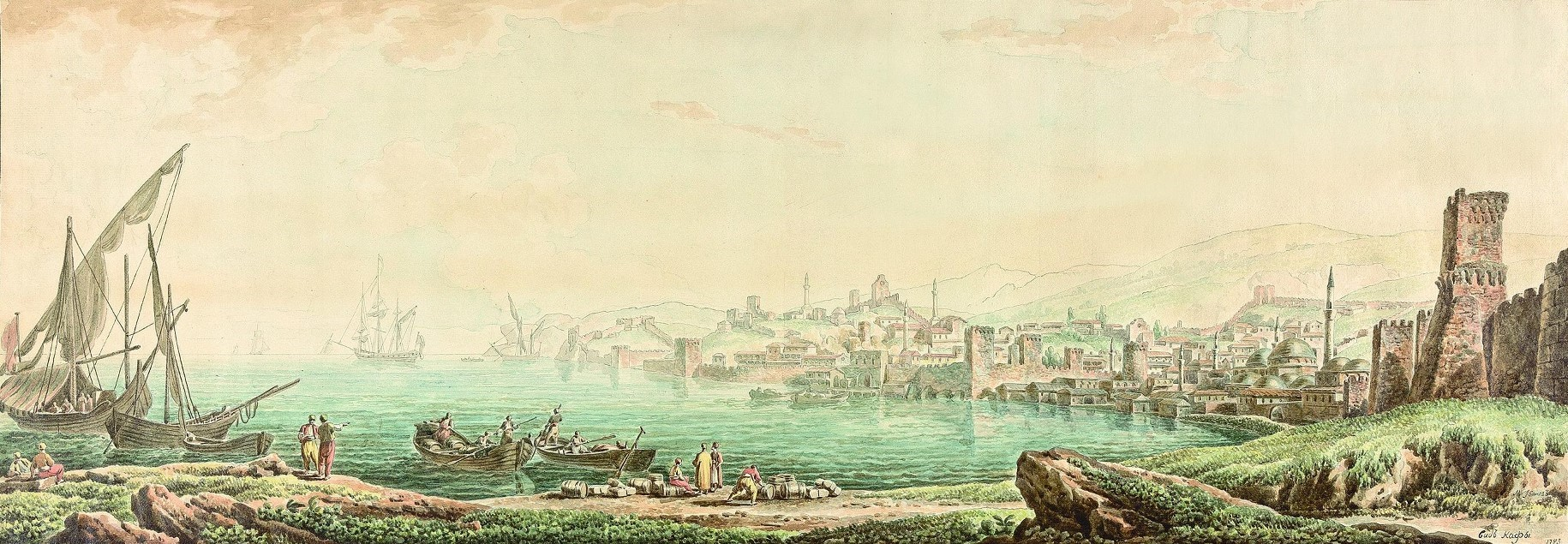
Panorama of the fortress of Feodosia (Kaffa) by Mikhail Ivanov (1783)

=== Soviet Union ===
==== WWII and Holocaust ====
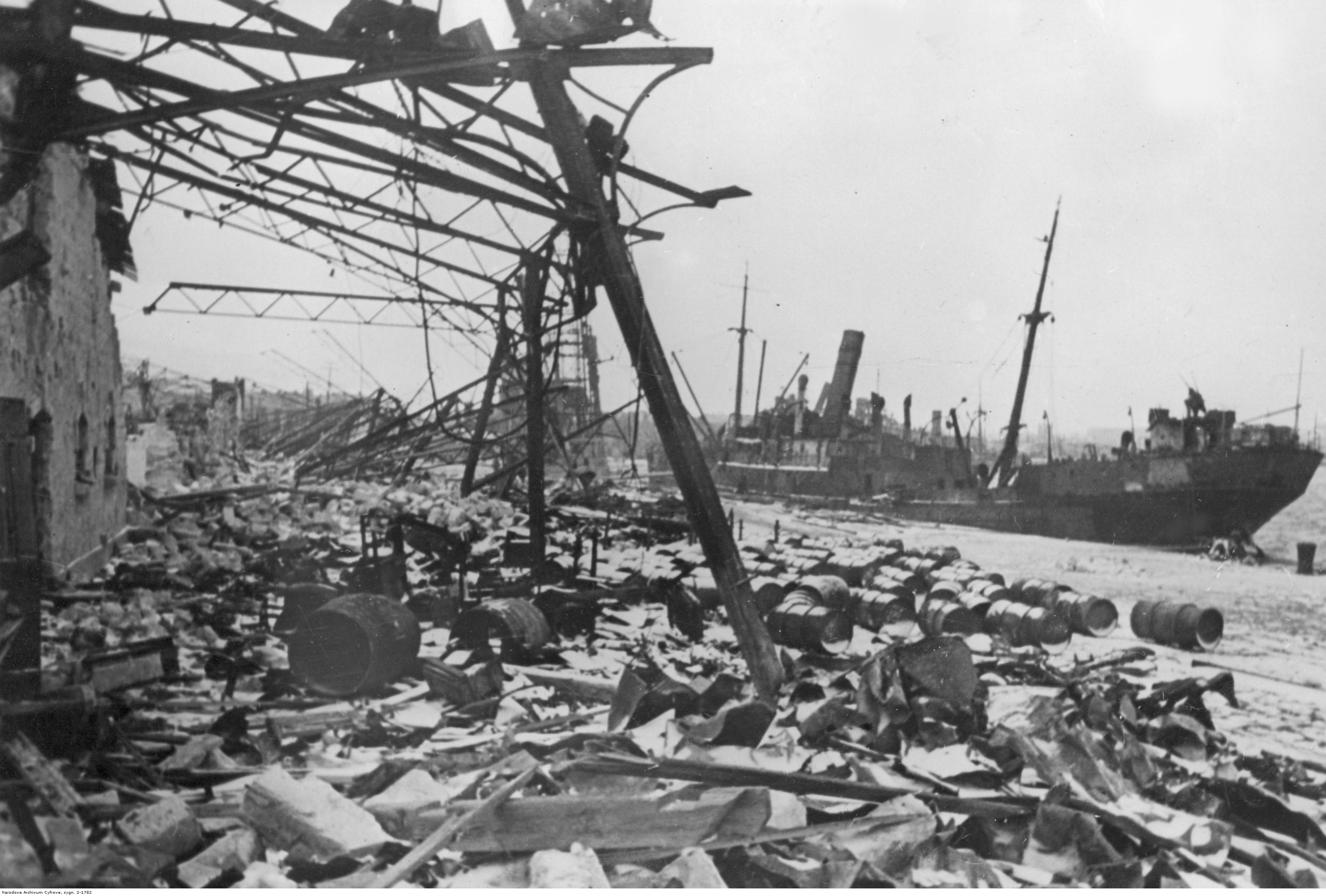
Destroyed port in 1942

The city was occupied by the forces of Nazi Germany during World War II, sustaining significant damage in the process. The Jewish population numbering 3,248 before the German occupation was murdered by SD-Einsatzgruppe D between November 16 and December 15, 1941. A witness interviewed by the Soviet Extraordinary Commission in 1944 and quoted on the website of the French organization Yahad-In Unum described how the Jews were rounded-up in the city:

[A]ll the Jews were gathered. The Germans told them they would be displaced somewhere in Ukraine. On December 4, 1941, in the morning, all the Jews, including my father, my mother and my sister were taken to an anti-tank trench where they were executed by German shooters. 1,500-1,700 people were shot that day.

A monument commemorating the Holocaust victims is situated at the crossroads of Kerchensky and Symferopolsky highways. On Passover eve, 7 April 2012, unknown persons desecrated the monument for the sixth time in what was allegedly an anti-Semitic act.

All native Tatar inhabitants were arrested by Soviet forces as several thousand Tatars had fought side-by-side with the Nazis against Soviet forces and had participated in the Jewish genocide. Following Stalin's orders, all Tatars were sent to Kazakhstan, Uzbekistan and other Central Asian republics of the USSR.

=== Ukraine ===
==== Russian occupation ====
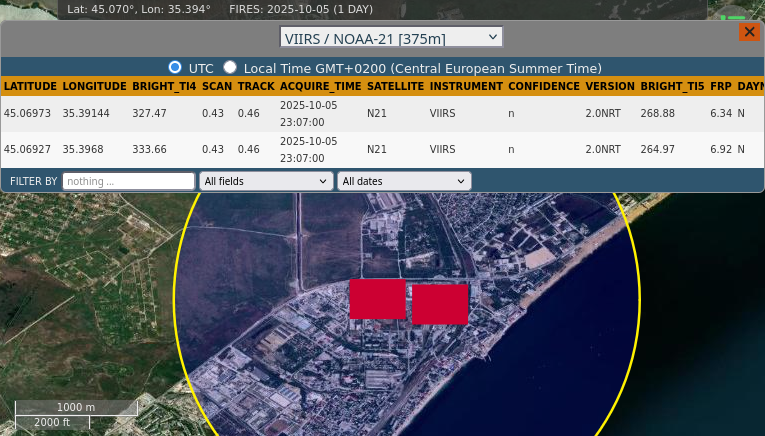
NASA's FIRMS detected fire on 5 October 2025 23:07:00 (UTC) at the Feodosia oil depot

During the Russian invasion of Ukraine, the Russian warship Novocherkassk, a landing ship likely used to transport drones, was hit in the early morning hours of 26 December 2023 in the harbour of Feodosia. There was a large fire and explosion. Russia reported that two missiles that were fired from Sukhoi Su-24 jets were shot down.

On 6 October 2025 Feodosia's marine oil depot was attacked by drones causing a fire that burned for two days.

== Geography ==
=== Climate ===
Feodosia has a humid subtropical climate (Köppen Cfa), narrowly missing the boundary of a Mediterranean climate (Köppen Csa), with hot summer months drier than cool mild winter months but not enough to qualify as Mediterranean.

Climate data for Feodosia (1991–2020, extremes 1881–present)
Month	Jan	Feb	Mar	Apr	May	Jun	Jul	Aug	Sep	Oct	Nov	Dec	Year
Record high °C (°F)	19.1 (66.4)	18.6 (65.5)	27.2 (81.0)	27.5 (81.5)	31.9 (89.4)	35.0 (95.0)	38.8 (101.8)	38.9 (102.0)	33.3 (91.9)	29.0 (84.2)	26.9 (80.4)	21.8 (71.2)	38.9 (102.0)
Mean daily maximum °C (°F)	4.9 (40.8)	5.6 (42.1)	9.5 (49.1)	15.1 (59.2)	21.3 (70.3)	26.5 (79.7)	29.7 (85.5)	29.6 (85.3)	23.9 (75.0)	17.5 (63.5)	11.1 (52.0)	6.9 (44.4)	16.8 (62.2)
Daily mean °C (°F)	2.0 (35.6)	2.4 (36.3)	5.8 (42.4)	10.9 (51.6)	16.7 (62.1)	21.9 (71.4)	24.8 (76.6)	24.6 (76.3)	19.3 (66.7)	13.5 (56.3)	7.9 (46.2)	4.1 (39.4)	12.8 (55.0)
Mean daily minimum °C (°F)	−0.7 (30.7)	−0.4 (31.3)	2.8 (37.0)	7.4 (45.3)	12.8 (55.0)	17.6 (63.7)	20.4 (68.7)	20.2 (68.4)	15.3 (59.5)	10.1 (50.2)	5.0 (41.0)	1.5 (34.7)	9.3 (48.7)
Record low °C (°F)	−25.0 (−13.0)	−25.1 (−13.2)	−14.0 (6.8)	−5.5 (22.1)	1.1 (34.0)	5.0 (41.0)	9.1 (48.4)	9.4 (48.9)	1.4 (34.5)	−11.2 (11.8)	−14.9 (5.2)	−18.6 (−1.5)	−25.1 (−13.2)
Average precipitation mm (inches)	43 (1.7)	36 (1.4)	38 (1.5)	32 (1.3)	41 (1.6)	43 (1.7)	33 (1.3)	41 (1.6)	43 (1.7)	41 (1.6)	41 (1.6)	46 (1.8)	478 (18.8)
Average extreme snow depth cm (inches)	1 (0.4)	2 (0.8)	1 (0.4)	0 (0)	0 (0)	0 (0)	0 (0)	0 (0)	0 (0)	0 (0)	0 (0)	1 (0.4)	2 (0.8)
Average rainy days	12	8	10	11	9	7	7	6	9	8	12	12	111
Average snowy days	8	8	6	0.3	0.1	0	0	0	0	0.1	2	6	31
Average relative humidity (%)	80.5	78.1	75.5	72.6	70.8	67.5	63.0	63.1	79.6	76.0	80.0	81.0	73.1
Mean monthly sunshine hours	63	72	129	182	252	283	308	287	246	166	85	51	2,124
Source 1: Pogoda.ru.net
Source 2: NOAA (humidity 1991–2020, sun 1961−1990)

== Modern Feodosia ==
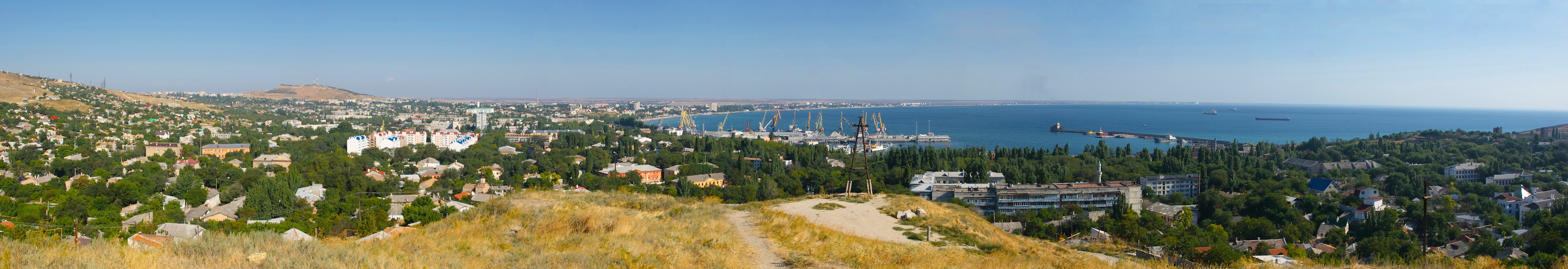
Panorama Feodosia seen from the mountain Tepe Oba.I

Feodosia embankment.

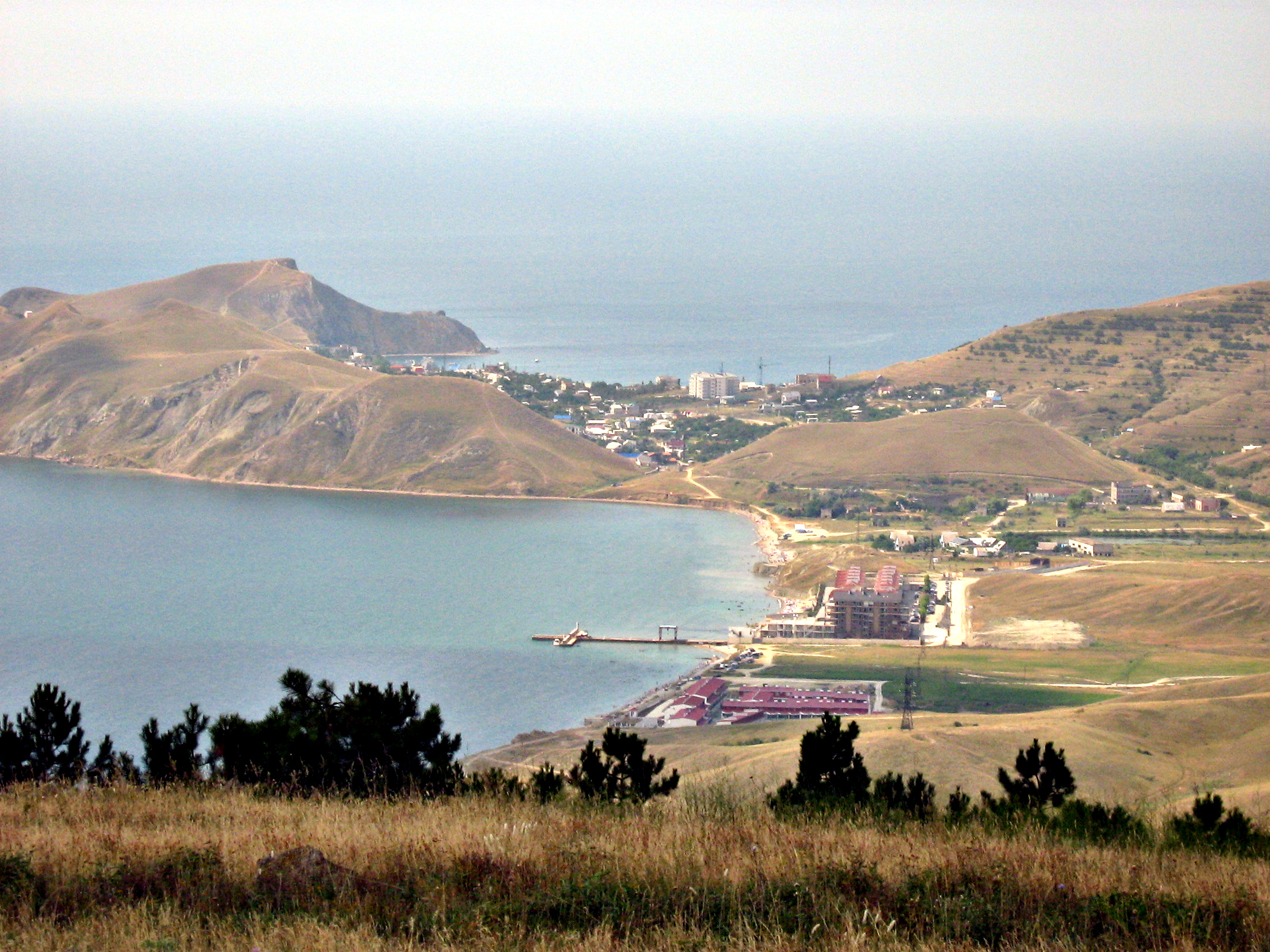
View from Tepe-Oba over Ordzhonikidze (Urban-type settlement under the town's jurisdiction)

Modern Feodosia is a resort city with a population of about 69,000 people. It has beaches, mineral springs, and mud baths, sanatoria, and rest homes. Apart from tourism, its economy rests on agriculture and fisheries. Local industries include fishing, brewing and canning. As with much of the Crimea, most of its population is ethnically Russian; the Ukrainian language is infrequently used. In June 2006, Feodosia made the news with the 2006 anti-NATO protests.

While most beaches in the Crimea are made of pebbles, in the Feodosia area there is a unique Golden Beach (Zolotoy Plyazh) made of small seashells which stretches for some 15 km.

The city is sparsely populated during the winter months and most cafes and restaurants are closed. Business and tourism increase in mid-June and peak during July and August. As in the other resort towns of the Crimea, the tourists come mostly from the Commonwealth of Independent States countries of the former Soviet Union.

Feodosia was the city where the seascape painter Ivan Aivazovsky lived and worked all his life, and where general Pyotr Kotlyarevsky and the writer Alexander Grin spent their declining years. Popular tourist locations include the Aivazovsky National Art Gallery and the Genoese fortress.

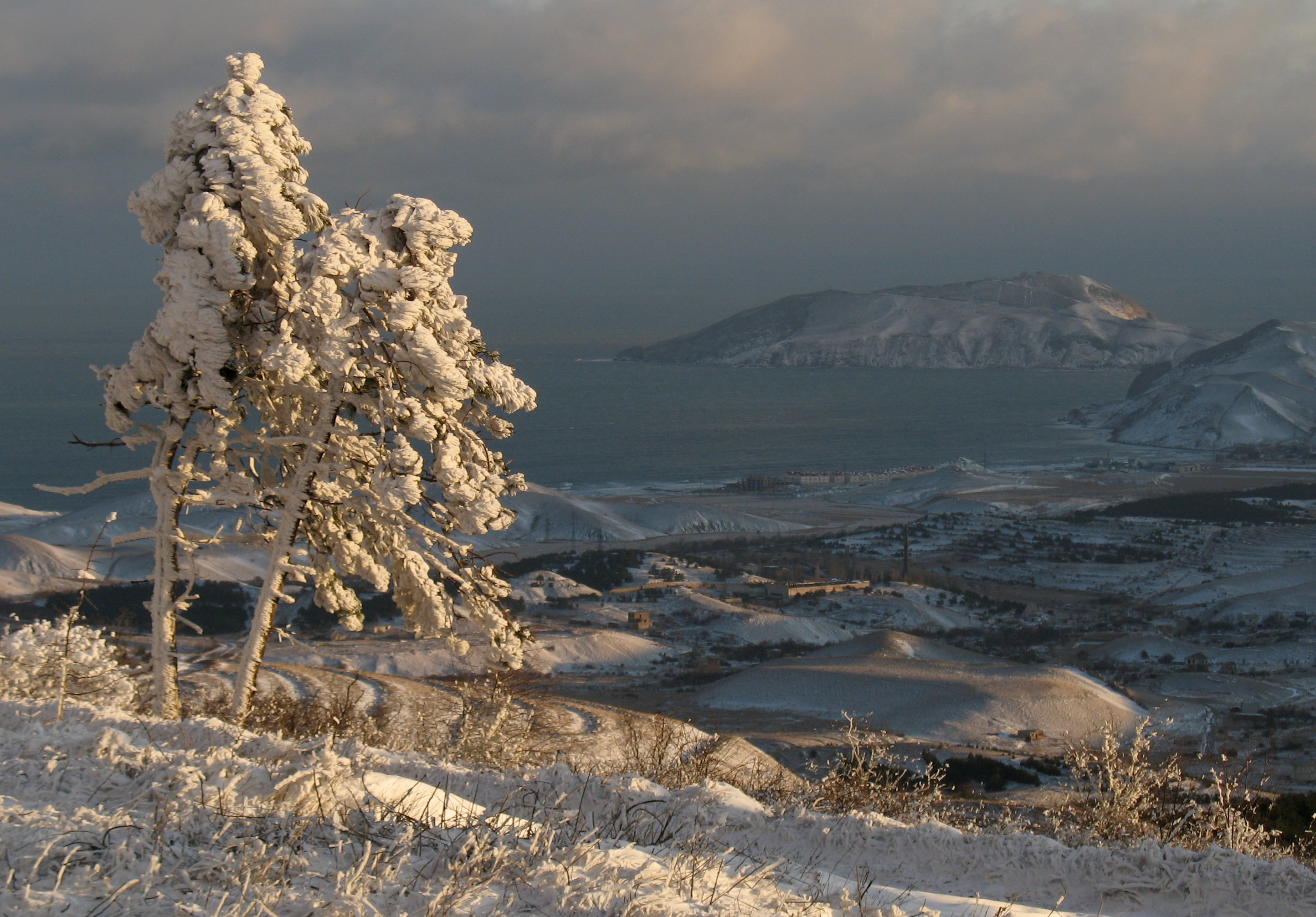
View from Tepe-Oba

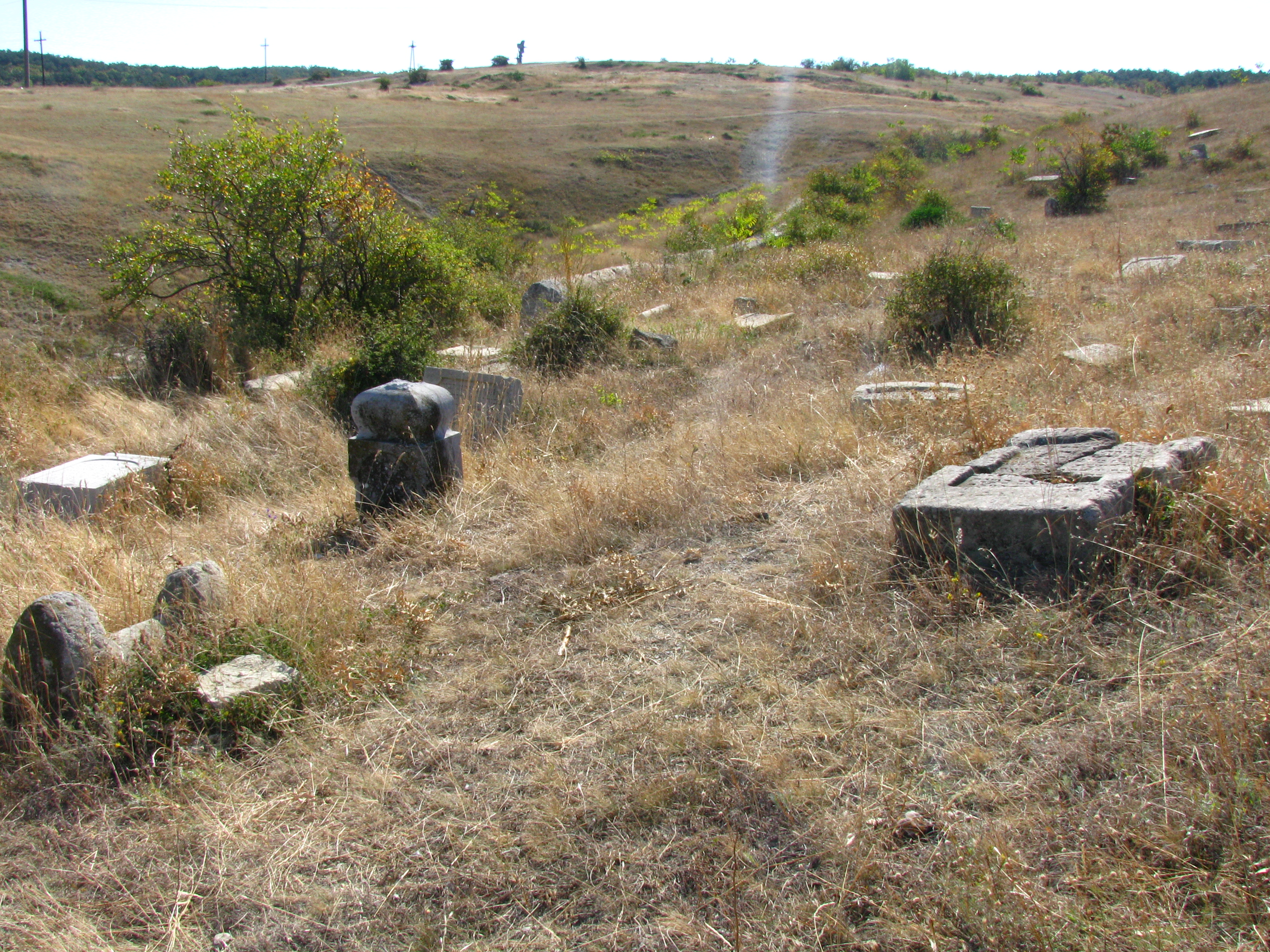
Ancient Karaites cemetery

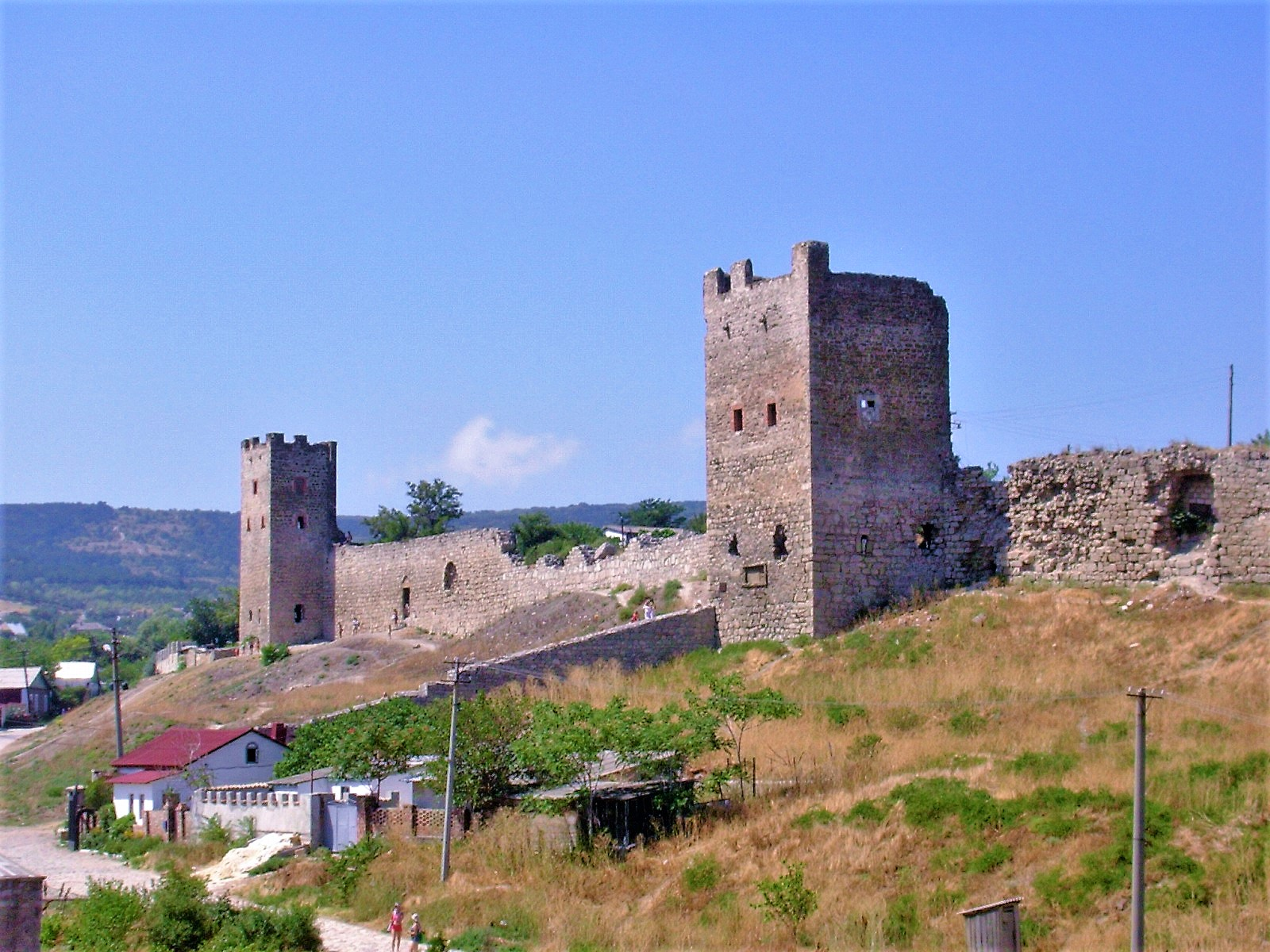
Genoese castle Caffa

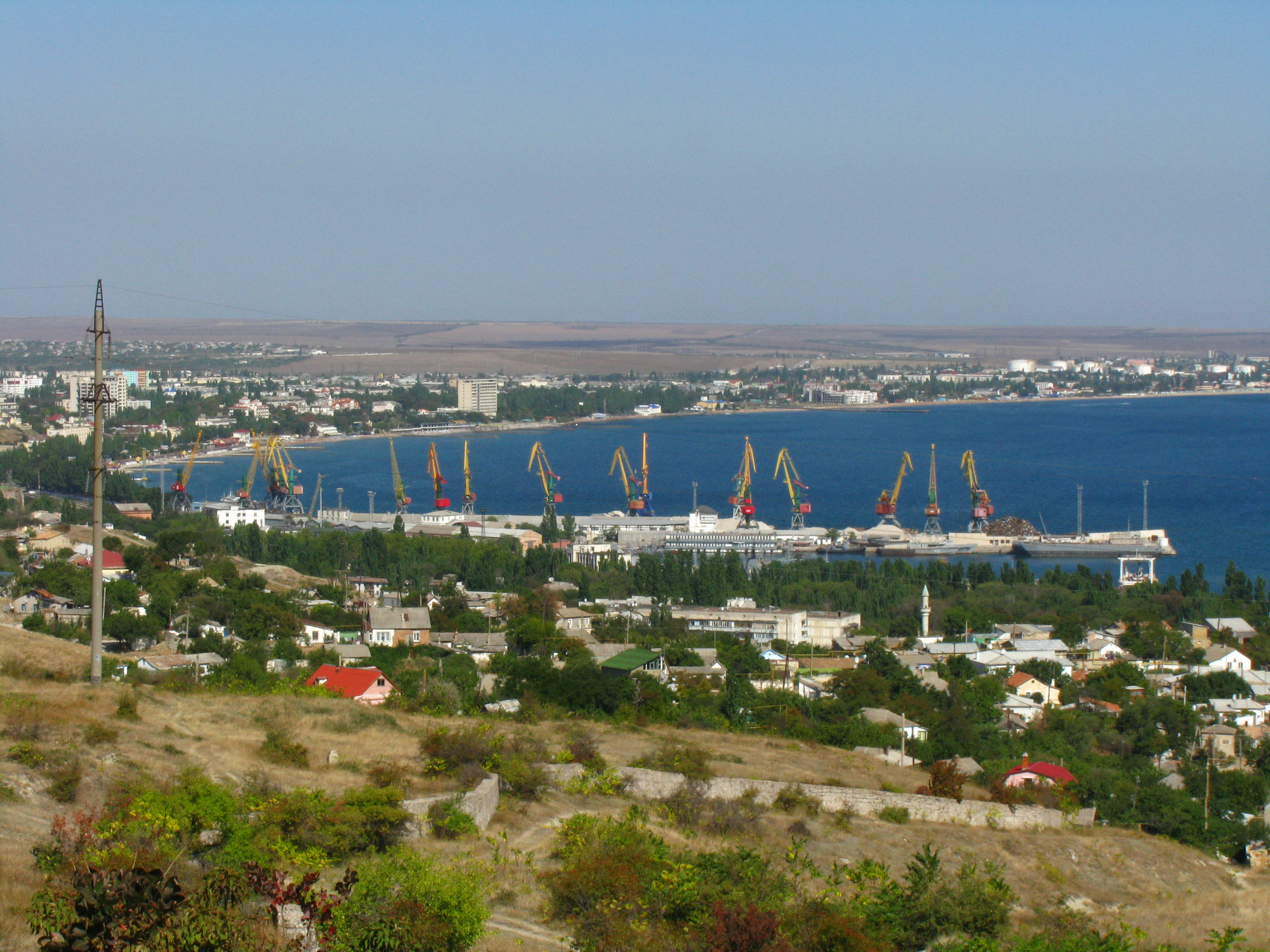
Port and Tepe-Oba

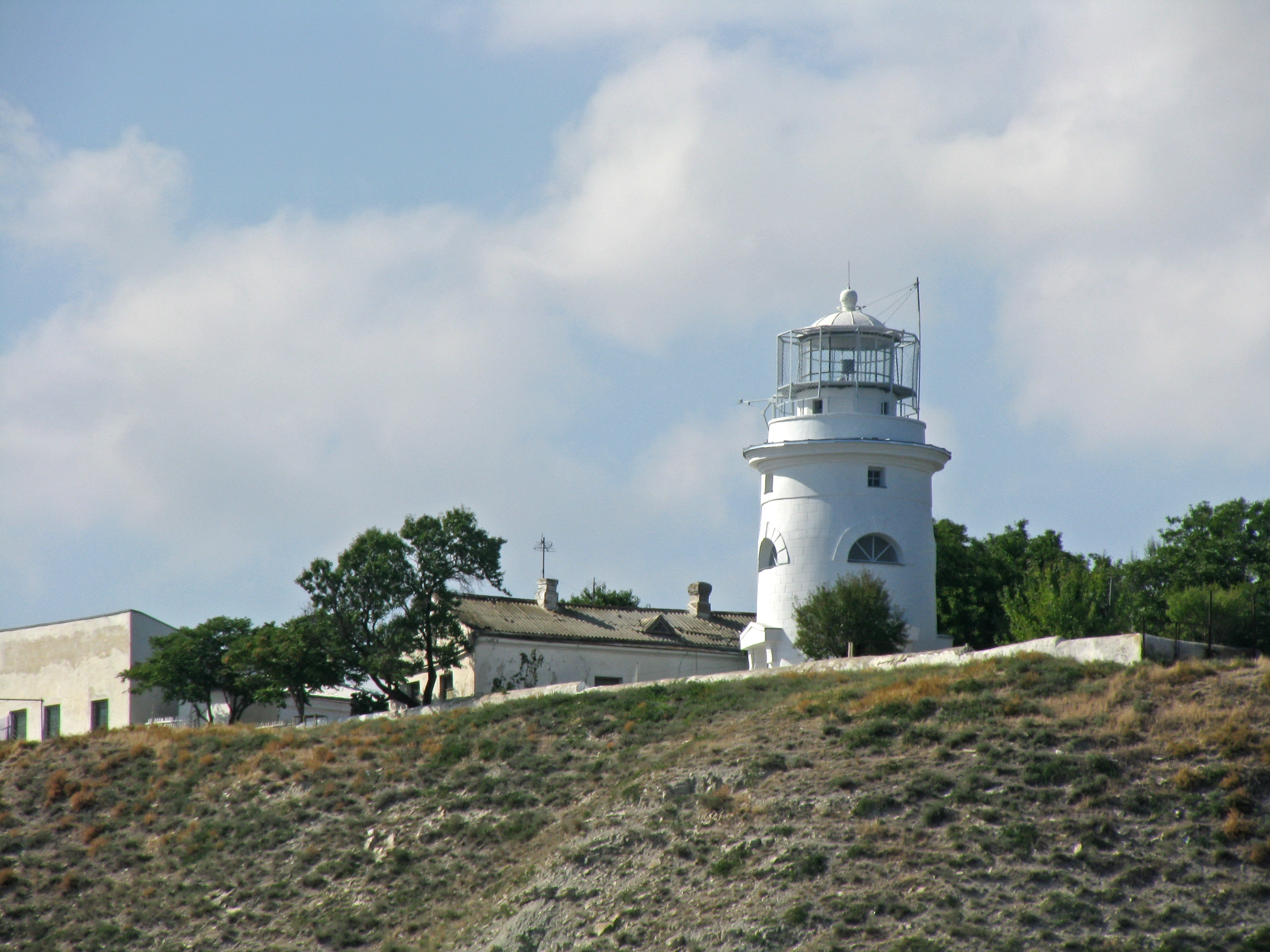
Lighthouse on Tepe-Oba

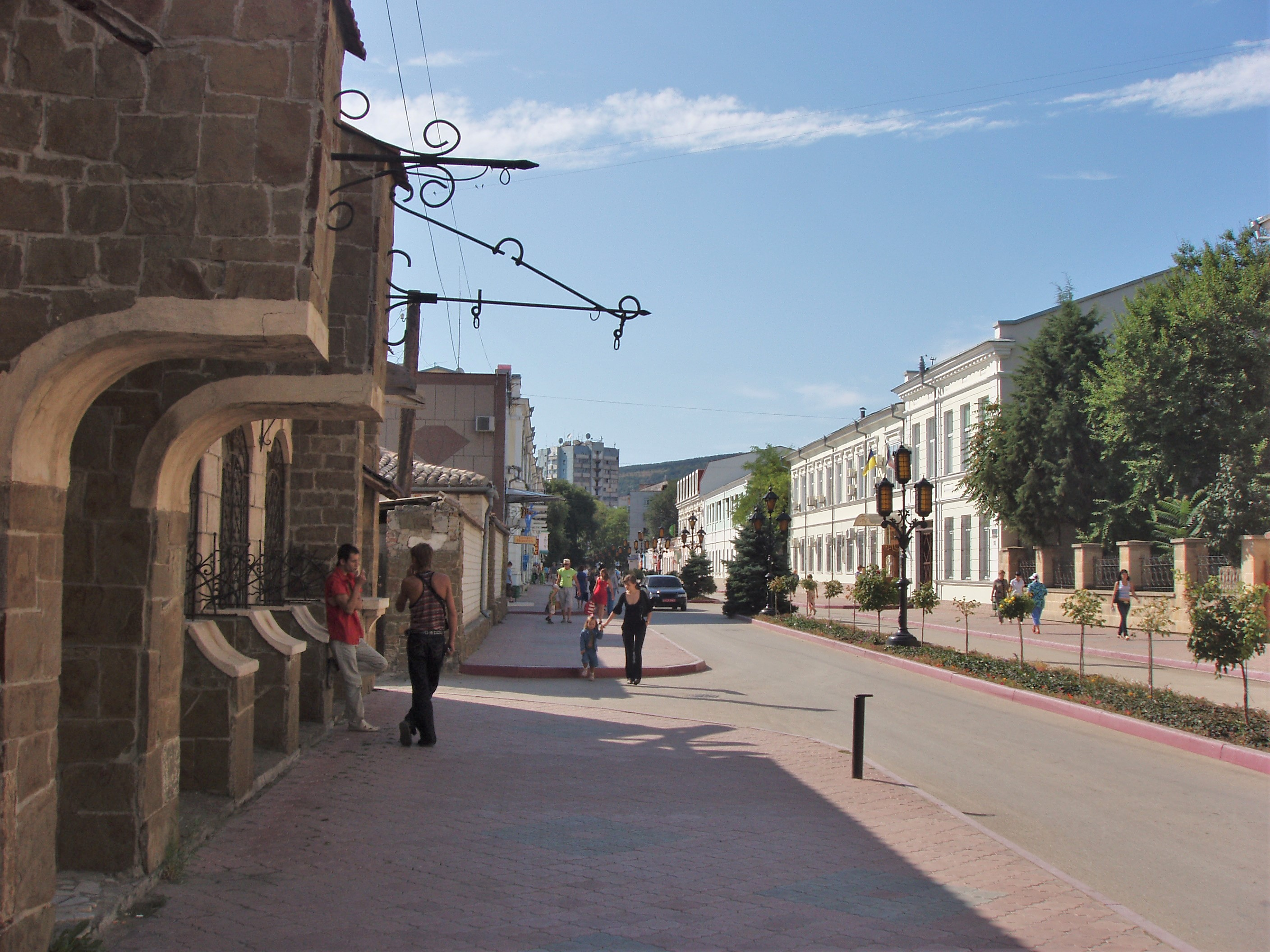
Feodosia city centre

== Economy ==
- Sudokompozit – ship design R&D naval hardware

Kasatka TsNII Gp NPO Uran (Gagra Pitsunda) – ship design R&D naval hardware

- Gidropribor FeOMMZ, torpedo manufacturing and ship yard (Ordzhonikidze)

NPO Uran TsNII Gp "Kasatka" (Lab N°5 NII400) torpedoes (Gagra Pitsunda)

- Russia Black Sea Fleet Navy Ship repair yards
- FOMZ Opto Mechanical Plant FKOZ
- Feodosia Economic Industrial Zone FPZ (west)
- Feodosia FMZ Engineering/Machine-building Plant
- Feodosia FPZ (Priborostroeni Priladobudivni) Instrument-making Plant
- PO More Shipyard (Prymorskyi, Feodosia Municipality)

== Twin towns—sister cities ==
- Armavir, Armenia
- Azov, Russia
- Kronstadt, Russia
- Stavropol, Russia
- Kołobrzeg, Poland
- and others

== Notable people ==
- Khachatur of Kaffa (died 1658), Armenian priest and chronicler
- Ivan Aivazovsky (1817–1900), Russian painter
- Yuriy Barashian (born 1979), Ukrainian boxer
- Serhiy Derevyanchenko (born 1985), Ukrainian boxer
- Roman Kapitonenko (born 1981), Ukrainian boxer
- Tetyana Kozyrenko (born 1996), Ukrainian football player
- Wolff Kostakowsky (1879–1944), American klezmer violinist
- Andrzej Liczik (born 1977), Ukrainian-Polish boxer

== In popular culture ==
The late-medieval city of Caffa is the location of a section of the novel Caprice and Rondo by the Scottish novelist Dorothy Dunnett.

An early 14th-century bishop of Caffa appears in Umberto Eco's novel The Name of the Rose, making several sharp replies in a long, tempestuous debate within a group of monks and clerics; he is portrayed as aggressive and somewhat narrow-minded.

== See also ==
- List of traditional Greek place names
