= Rozdolne Raion =

Coordinates: 45°46′12″N 33°29′17″E

Rozdolne raion Aqşeyh rayonı
- Raion
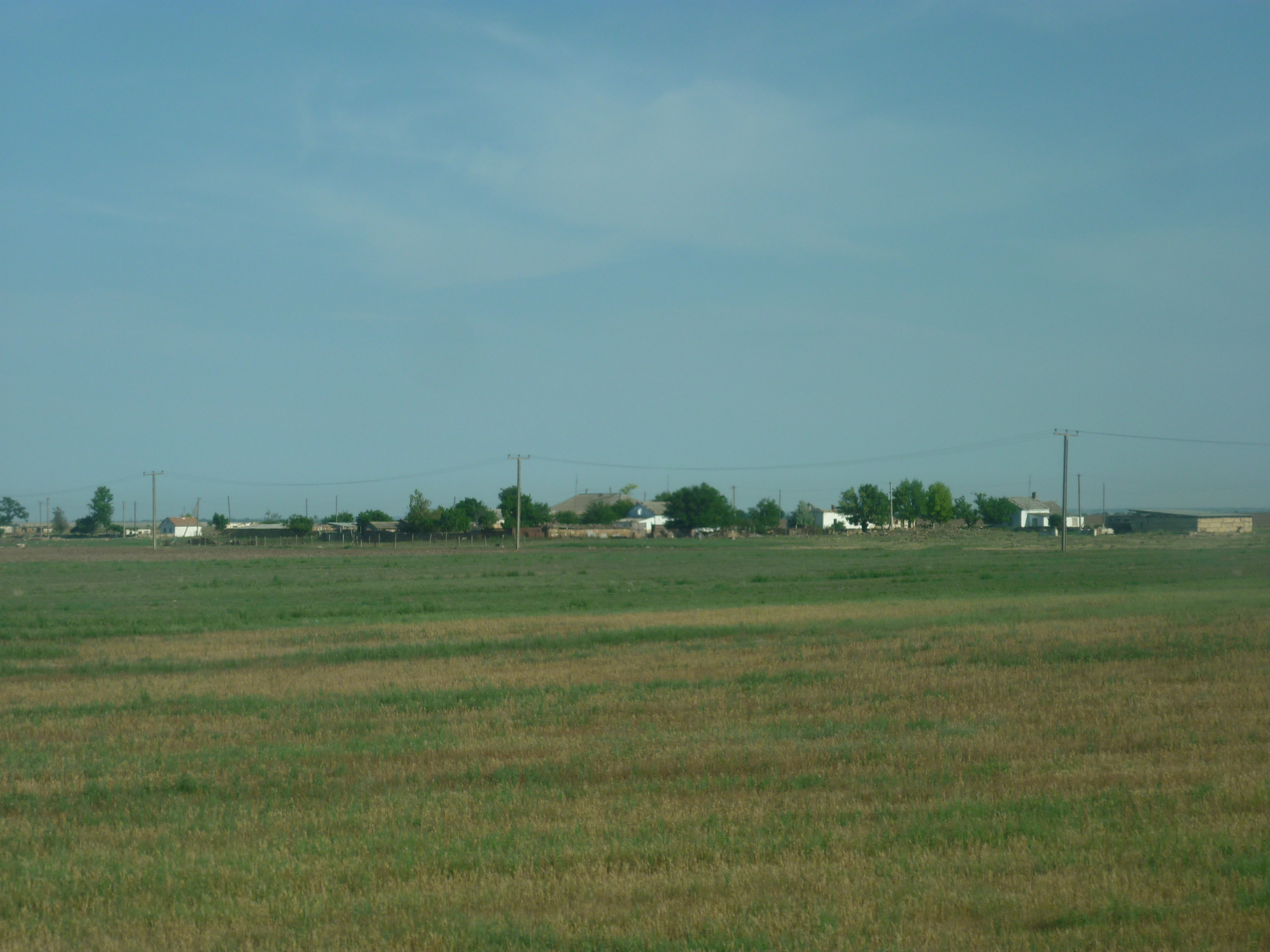
- Village (selo) Syeverne, Rozdolnensky District

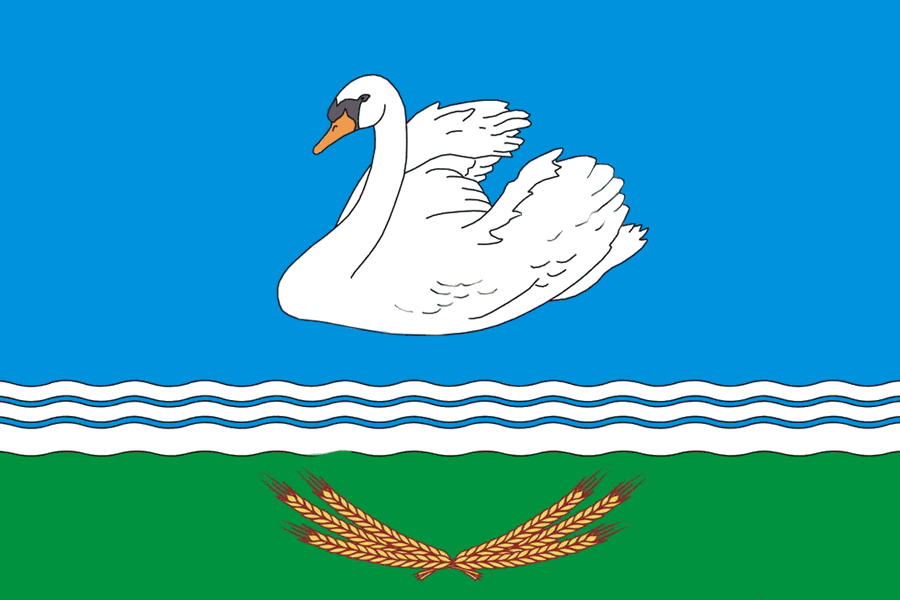
- Flag Seal
- Raion location within Crimea
- Country: Disputed: Ukraine (de jure); Russia (de facto)
- Republic: Crimea
- Capital: Rozdolne
- Subdivisions: List: 0 cities; 2 towns; 39 villages

Area
  - Total: 1,231 km^{2} (475 sq mi)

Population (2014)
  - Total: 30,633
  - Density: 24.88/km^{2} (64.45/sq mi)
- Time zone: UTC+3 (MSK)
- Dialing code: +380-6553
- Website: http://razdolnoe.rk.gov.ru

Rozdolne Raion (Ukrainian: Роздольненський район, Russian: Раздольненский район, Crimean Tatar: Aqşeyh rayonı) is a district (raion) within the Autonomous Republic of Crimea, a territory internationally recognized as part of Ukraine, but since 2014 occupied and incorporated by the Russian Federation as the Republic of Crimea. Despite Ukraine's administrative reform, which aimed at more than halving the number of districts in Crimea, Russia continues to use the original boundaries of the raion, and administers it as one of 25 districts in total. Its administrative center is the urban-type settlement of Rozdolne. Population: 30,633 (2014 Census).

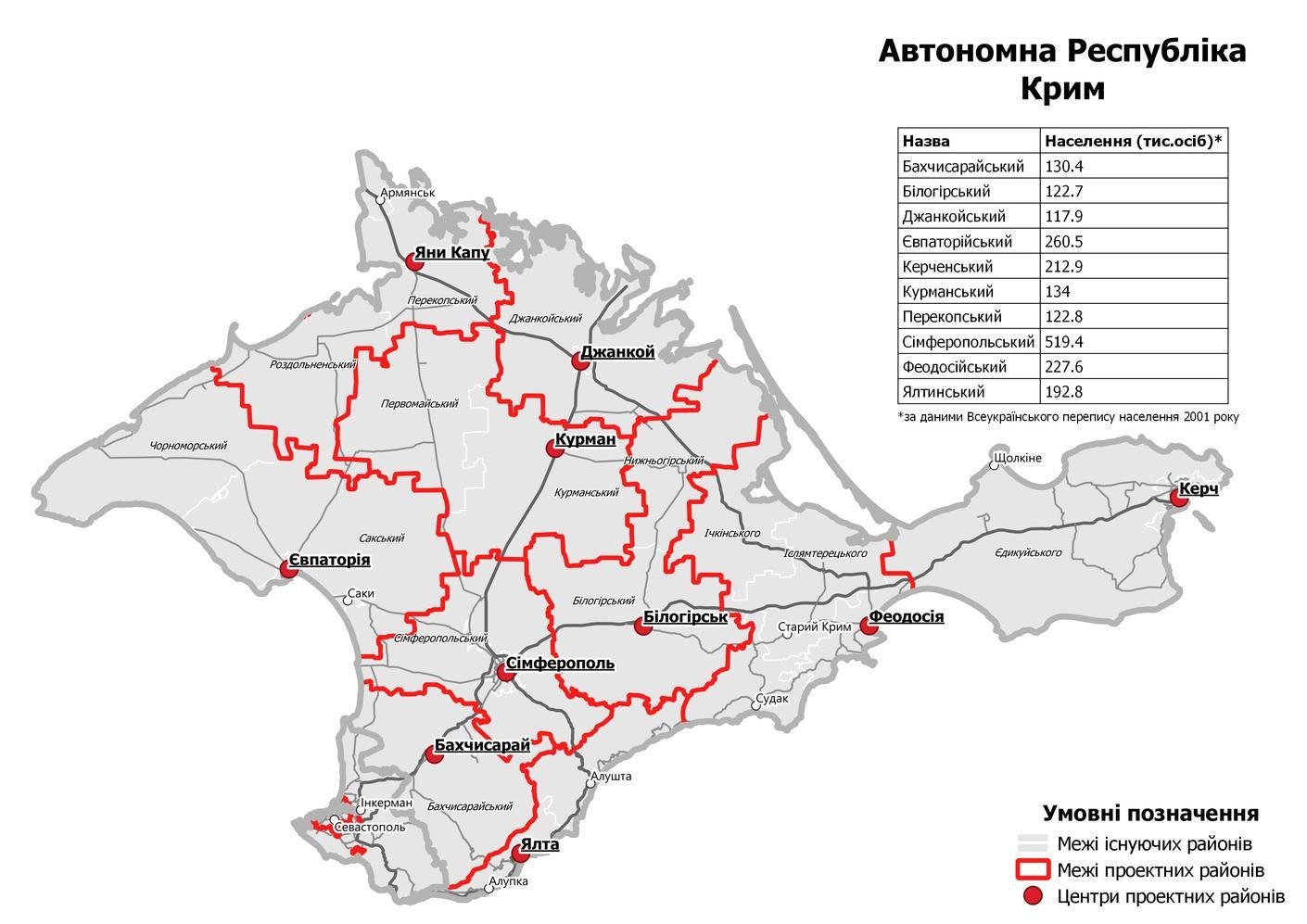
In July 2020, the Verkhovna Rada approved an administrative reform in Crimea

== 2020 Ukrainian Administrative Reform ==
In July 2020, Ukraine conducted an administrative reform throughout its de jure territory. This included Crimea, which was at the time occupied by Russia, and is still ongoing as of October 2023. Crimea was reorganized from 14 raions and 11 municipalities into 10 raions, with municipalities abolished altogether.

Rozdolne Raion was abolished, and its territories to become a part of Perekop Raion, but this has not yet been implemented due to the ongoing Russian occupation.

== Demographics ==
According to the 2001 Ukrainian census, the raion had a population of 37,185. Ukrainians and Russians are the two biggest ethnic groups in the district, accounting for roughly 40% of the population respectively. Crimean Tatars constitute a significant minority. Rural areas are often Ukrainian-speaking, while the Russian language is used by the vast majority in population centers, where the ethnic Russian population is mostly concentrated. Crimean Tatar is spoken by a significant share of the population in almost every settlement and dominates in three settlements in the district. The historic Black Sea German population mostly migrated to Germany under the right of return as Spätaussiedler, or still resides in Siberia and Kazakhstan, to where they got deported in 1941.

Ethnic groups
	percent
Russians	41.1%
Ukrainians	40.1%
Crimean Tatars	13.3%
Belarusians	1.4%
Tatars	0.9%
Armenians	0.7%
Poles	0.4%
Uzbeks	0.3%
Moldovans	0.2%
Azerbaijanis	0.2%

Native languages
	percent
Russian	64.0%
Ukrainian	20.8%
Crimean Tatar	12.6%
Armenian	0.5%
Belarusian	0.4%
Moldovan	0.1%
others	1.6%

=== Settlements in the district ===
- Avrora
- Bakhchivka
- Berezivka
- Botanichne
- Chekhove
- Chernyshove
- Chervone
- Fedorivka
- Horodne
- Kashtanivka
- Kereit
- Kovilne
- Komyshne
- Kotovske
- Kodzhalak
- Kropotkine
- Kumove
- Maksymivka
- Molochne
- Nyva
- Novoselivske
- Ovrazhne
- Orlivka
- Portove
- Rylyeyevka
- Rozdolne
- Ruchi
- Serebrianka
- Sieverne
- Sinokisne
- Slavne
- Slovianske
- Sokoly
- Tavkel-Naiman
- Vitryanka
- Vohni
- Volochaivka
- Voronky
- Zymyne

== Notable people ==
- Oleksandr Artemenko (born 1987), Ukrainian football player
- Volodymyr Balukh (born 1971), Ukrainian nationalist, political activist and businessman
- Oleksandr Bohach (born 1983), Ukrainian football player
- Dmytro Brovkin (born 1984), Ukrainian football player
- Serhiy Kovalets (born 1968), Ukrainian football player and current manager of Inhulets Petrove
- Ruslan Mamutov (1993-2022), Ukrainian football player
