= Kodzhalak =

Village in Crimea, Ukraine

Kodzhalak Коджалак
- Village
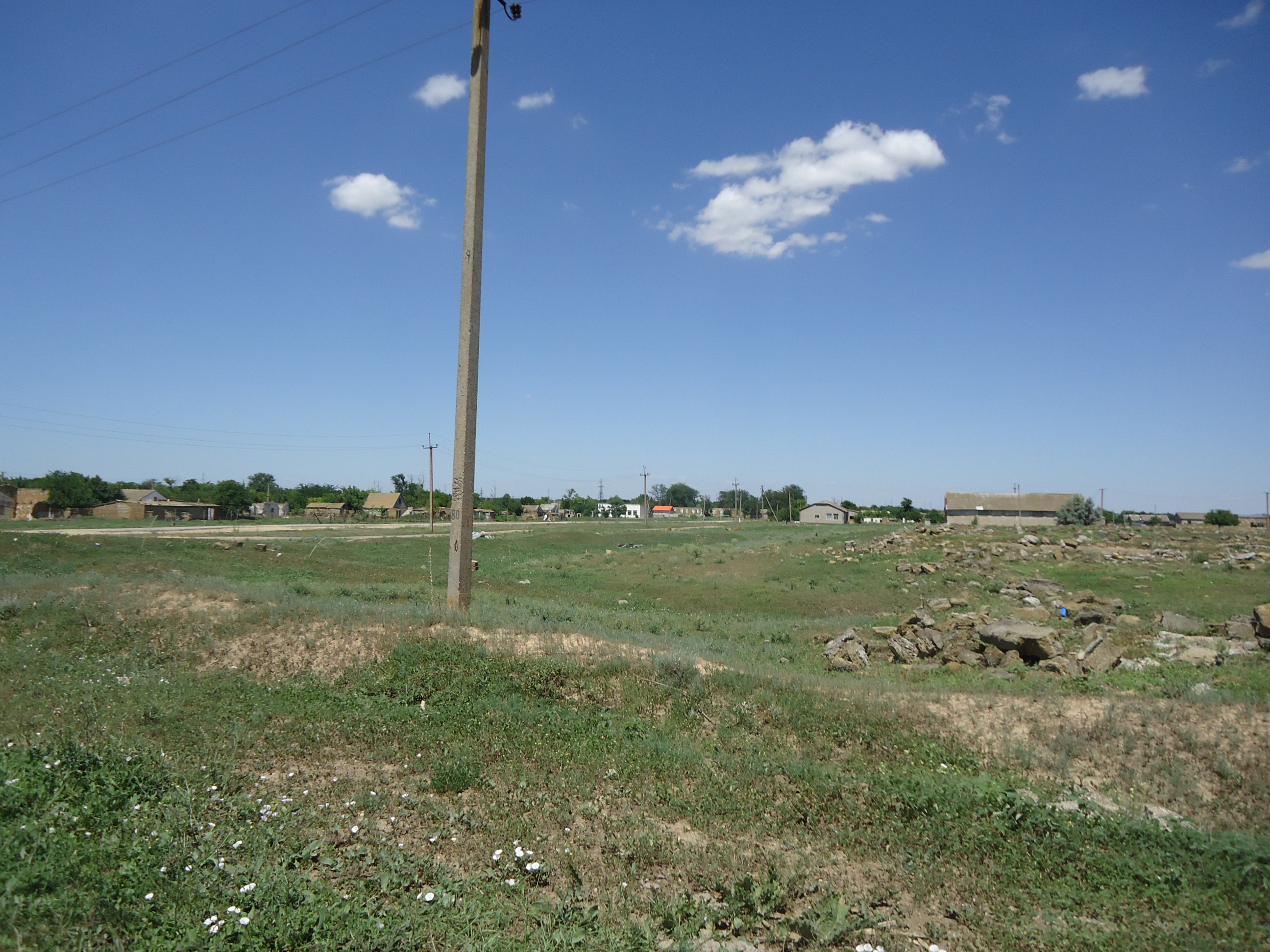

- Location within Crimea Location within Ukraine
- Coordinates: 45°33′3″N 33°30′4″E
- Country: Ukraine
- Republic: Autonomous Republic of Crimea
- Raion: Rozdolne Raion
- Hromada: Zymyne settlement hromada

Government
  - Mayor: Volodymyr Mykolayovych Pinchuk

Area
  - Total: 0.61 km^{2} (0.24 sq mi)
- Elevation: 59 m (194 ft)

Population (2001)
  - Total: 467
  - Density: 770/km^{2} (2,000/sq mi)
- Time zone: UTC+2 (EET)
  - Summer (DST): UTC+3 (EEST)
- Postal code: 96209
- Area code: +380 6553
- Vehicle registration: AK/KK/01
- Control: Russia

Kodzhalak (Ukrainian: Коджалак; Crimean Tatar: Qocalaq), until 2023 Krasnoarmiiske (Ukrainian: Красноармійське; Russian: Красноармейское), is a village located on the territory of the Autonomous Republic of Crimea in Southern Ukraine. Due to its location on the Crimean peninsula, the settlement is part of an ongoing territorial dispute between Ukraine and the Russian Federation, which was triggered by a swift Russian military invasion, which resulted in the full occupation of the peninsula. Following the military takeover, Russia held a sham vote and unilaterally declared its annexation of Crimea, which enjoys barely any international recognition.

== History ==
The existence of the settlement was first documented by the Ottoman explorer Evliya Çelebi in 1667, when the region was still part of the Crimean Khanate. Following the annexation of the Crimean Khanate by the Russian Empire, the local Crimean Tatar population abandoned the settlement and emigrated to Turkey. In 1888, German settlers reestablished the settlement as a Lutheran colony. Ethnic Ukrainians also started to populate the settlement during the following years. As of the 1926 Soviet census, the village's population consisted of 80 Germans, 14 Ukrainians and a single Russian person. In 1941, the NKVD ordered the deportation of the German population on the Crimean peninsula, which ended the 53-year-long German presence in the settlement. Seven years later, the village was renamed to Krasnoarmiiske, but regained its original Turkic name in 2023, after the Ukrainian parliament voted to introduce a law, which aimed at removing names linked to Russian imperialism.

== Demographics ==
As of the 2001 Ukrainian census, the settlement had a population of 476 inhabitants. In terms of ethnicity, it is estimated that Ukrainians make up a solid majority in the settlement, followed by significant Crimean Tatar and Russian communities. A small group of Belarusians also exists in the village. When it comes to spoken languages, most of the population is Ukrainophone, while large minorities speak Russian and Crimean Tatar. The exact native language composition was as follows:

Native languages in Kodzhalak
	percent
Ukrainian	54.2%
Russian	27.6%
Crimean Tatar	14.6%
Belarusian	0.9%
others	2.8%

=== Historical population data ===
According to the 1926 Soviet census, the settlement included 19 yards and was home to 18 farmers. The total population was 95 people. 80 residents were Germans, 14 were Ukrainians and while a single person identified as Russian.

1926 Soviet census (by ethnicity)
	percent
Germans	84.21%
Ukrainians	14.74%
Russians	1.05%
others	0.00%
