= Komyshne =

Village in Crimea, Ukraine

Komyshne Комишне
- Village
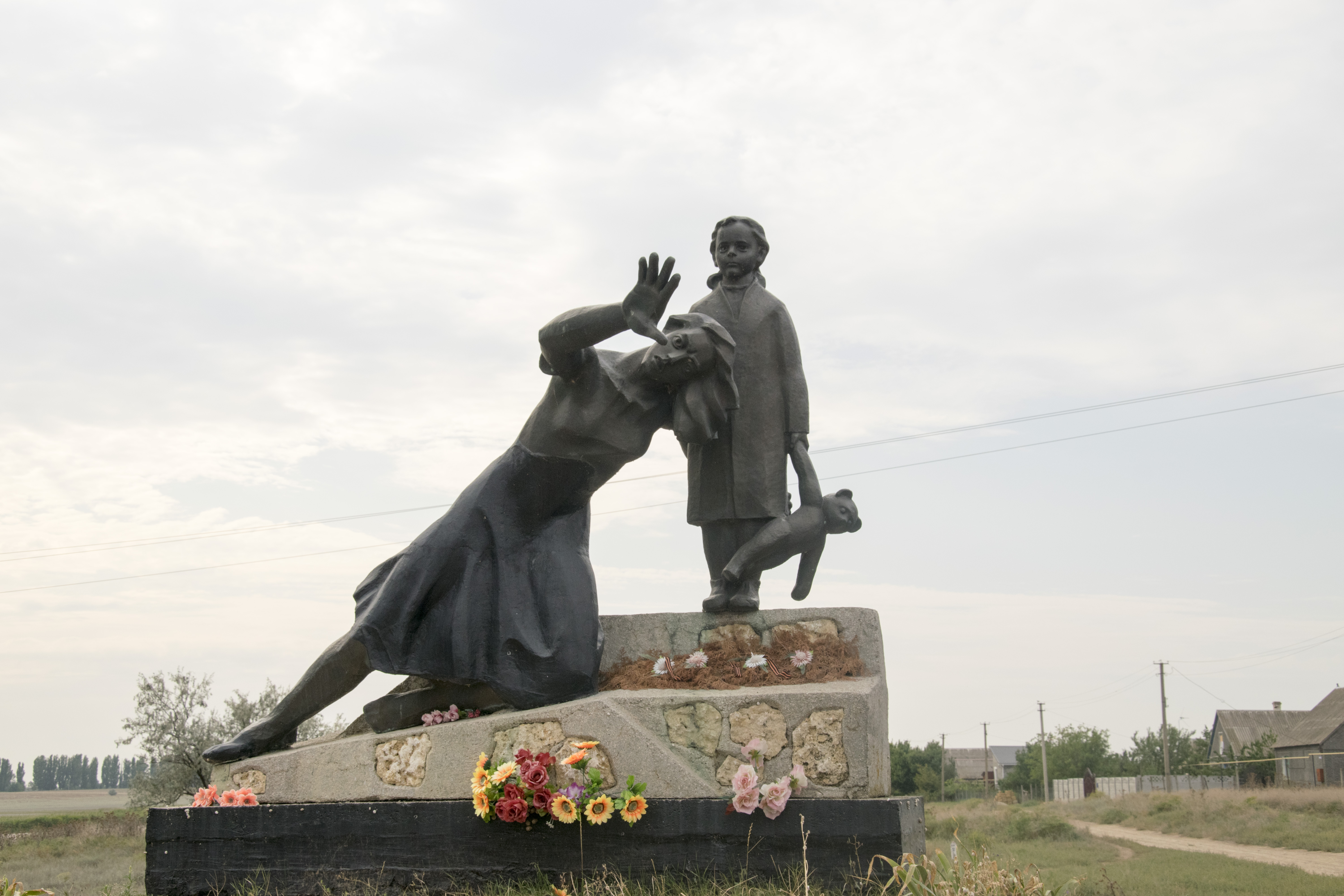

- Location within Crimea Location within Ukraine
- Coordinates: 45°47′40″N 33°40′31″E
- Country: Ukraine
- Republic: Autonomous Republic of Crimea
- Raion: Rozdolne Raion
- Hromada: Ruchi settlement hromada

Government
  - Mayor (2010): Anatoliy Yevhenovych Miroshnichenko

Population (2001)
  - Total: 431
- Time zone: UTC+2 (EET)
  - Summer (DST): UTC+3 (EEST)
- Postal code: 96220
- Area code: +380 6553
- Vehicle registration: AK/KK/01
- Control: Russia

Komyshne (Ukrainian: Комишне; Russian: Камышное; Crimean Tatar: Rus Köp Qarı), is a village located on the territory of the Autonomous Republic of Crimea, Ukraine. Along with the rest of the Crimean peninsula, the settlement is subject to an ongoing territorial dispute between Ukraine and the Russian Federation, which was triggered by a swift Russian military invasion in early 2014, which resulted in the full Russian occupation and subsequent unilateral annexation of the region, after Russian-installed authorities conducted a referendum, which is widely considered described to be sham vote.

== History ==
The village, which was initially documented as a place of settlement of Crimean Tatars, was first mentioned in documents dating back to 1784. Following the exodus of the Crimean Tatar population in the 19th century, which was a result of the Crimean War, Crimea German settlers reestablished the settlement, who were replaced by Slavic and Armenian settlers after the establishment of the Soviet Union. During World War II, along with the rest of Crimea, the village came under German occupation. On 12 April, 1944, the German troops carried out a massacre in village, in which parts of the predominantly Ukrainian population were rounded up and executed for being suspected in participating in anti-German partisan activity.

== Demographics ==
As of the 2001 Ukrainian census, the settlement had a population of 431 people. In terms of ethnic groups living in Komyshne, it is estimated that Ukrainians make up a large majority in the settlement, followed by significant Russian and Crimean Tatar minorities. People of Belarusian, Moldovan and Armenian descent also exist in the village. When it comes to spoken languages, a relative majority of the population is Ukrainophone, while large minorities speak Russian and Crimean Tatar. The exact native language composition was as follows:

Native languages in Komyshne
	percent
Ukrainian	47.6%
Russian	43.6%
Crimean Tatar	7.7%
Belarusian	0.5%
Romanian	0.2%
Armenian	0.2%
others	0.1%

== Gallery ==
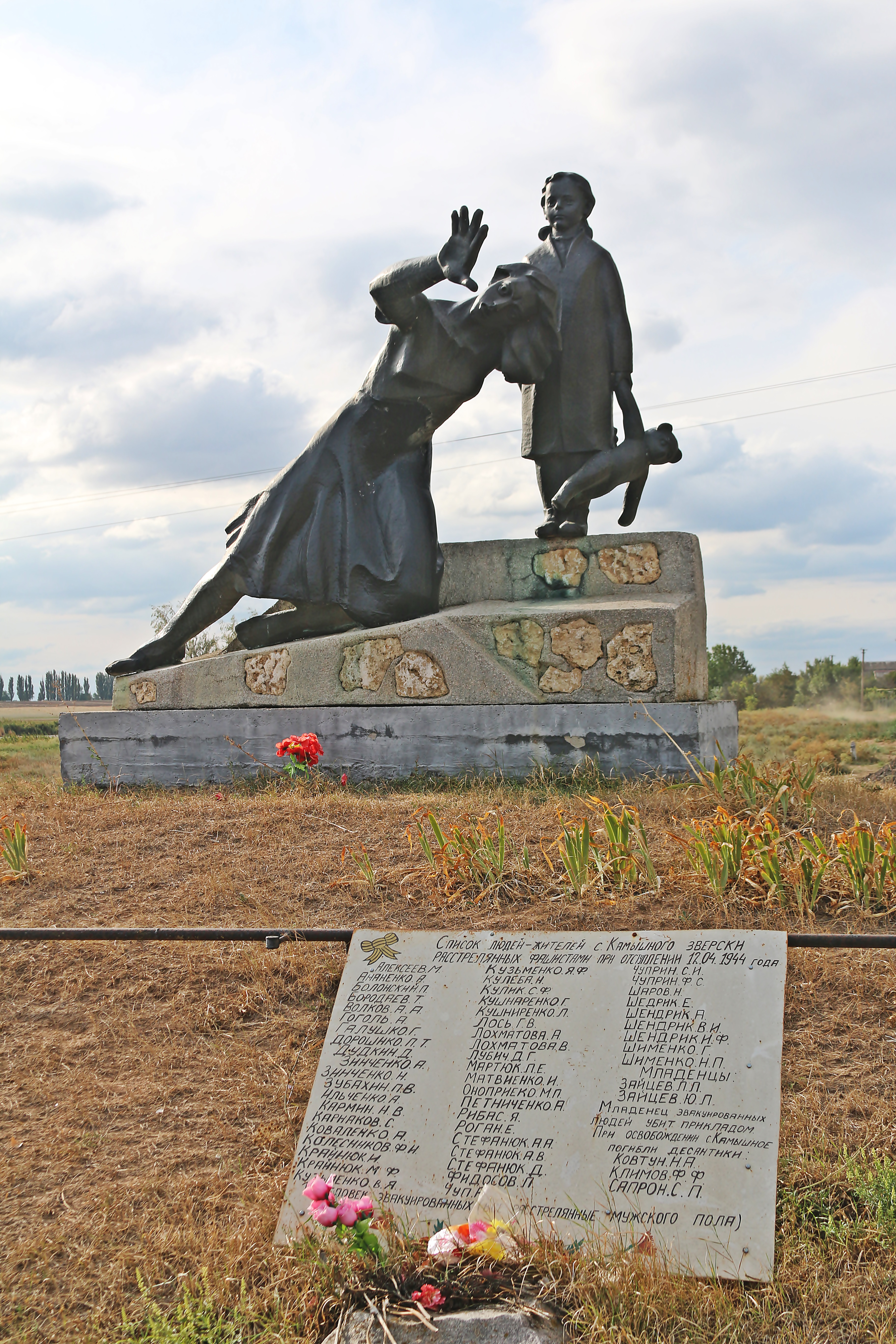
A monument with the names of people from the village, who died as the result of the Soviet-German War.
