= Serebrianka, Crimea =

Village in Crimea, Ukraine

Serebrianka Серебрянка
- Village
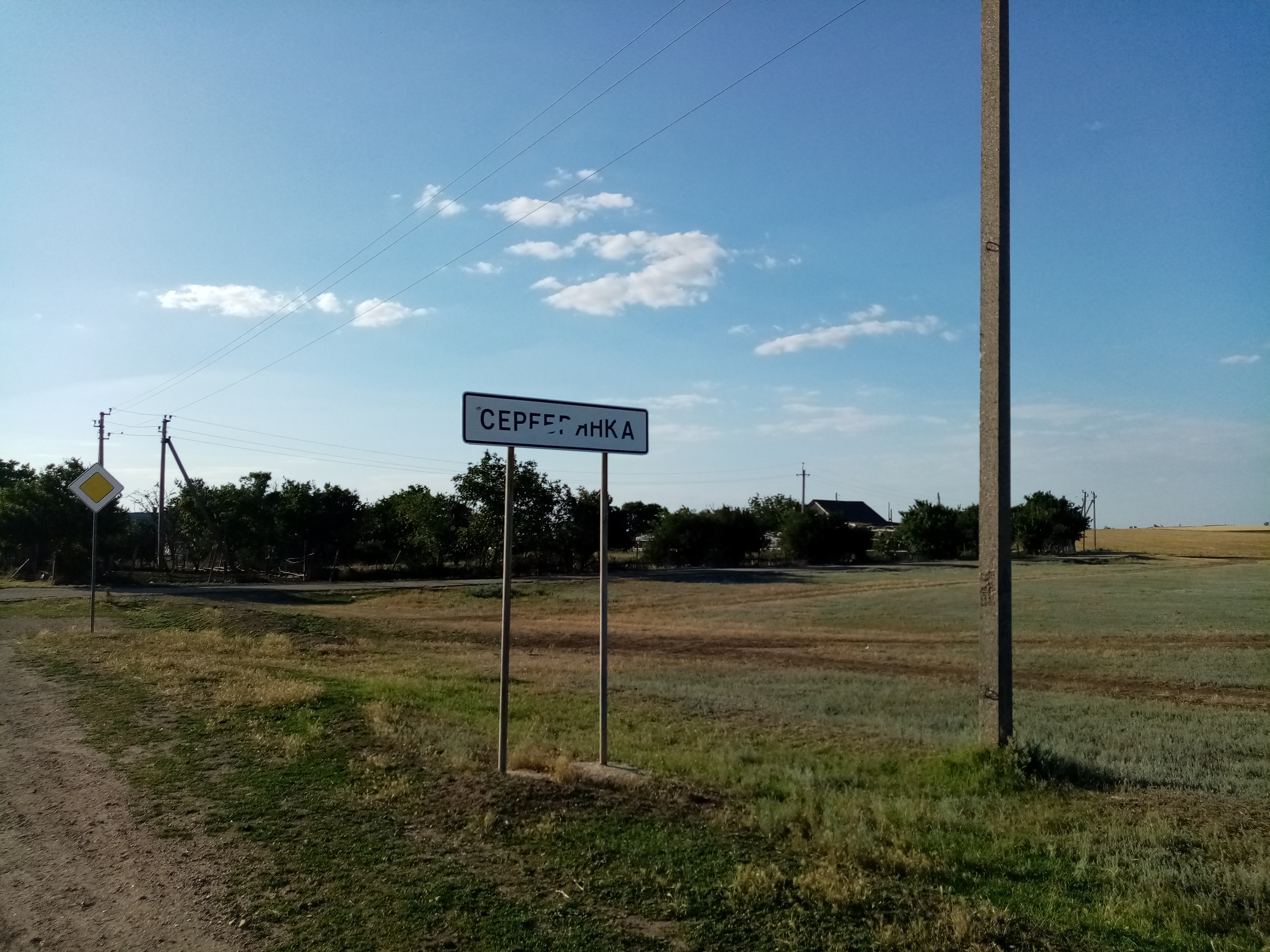

- Location within Crimea Location within Ukraine
- Coordinates: 45°38′17″N 33°29′58″E
- Country: Ukraine
- Republic: Autonomous Republic of Crimea
- Raion: Rozdolne Raion
- Hromada: Serebrianka settlement hromada

Government
  - Mayor (2012): Vitaliy Viktorovych Stepaniuk

Area
  - Total: 1.70 km^{2} (0.66 sq mi)
- Elevation: 94 m (308 ft)

Population (2001)
  - Total: 969
  - Density: 570/km^{2} (1,480/sq mi)
- Time zone: UTC+2 (EET)
  - Summer (DST): UTC+3 (EEST)
- Postal code: 96209
- Area code: +380 6553
- Vehicle registration: AK/KK/01
- Control: Russia

Serebrianka (Ukrainian: Серебрянка; Russian: Серебрянка; Crimean Tatar: Munus) is a village located in Southern Ukraine. Due to its location on the Crimean peninsula, the settlement is subject to an ongoing territorial dispute between Ukraine and the Russian Federation, which was triggered by a Russian military invasion that resulted in the full occupation of the peninsula. Following the swift takeover, Russia unilaterally declared its annexation of Crimea, which enjoys almost no international recognition.

== Geography ==
Serebrianka is located in the Tarkhankut Plains in central part of the Rozdolne district. The village and its surrounding areas are mostly agricultural, with the most important crops being wheat, watermelons, sunflowers, but also grapes. Following Ukraine's administrative reform in 2020, which aimed at more than halving the number of districts in Crimea, the entirety of the Rozdolne district was incorporated into the Perekopsk district. However, this change hasn't been implemented yet, since the Russian-installed authorities on the peninsula continue to use the original boundaries of the raion.

== History ==
The settlement was established in the early 1930s under the name of "Oktyabrdorf" and was administered part of the Crimean Jewish National District. As the result of the German occupation of Crimea during World War II, the local Jewish population of the village was almost entirely wiped out. The settlement came under Russian occupation in 2014 and was subsequently incorporated into the Russian Federation after Moscow-installed authorities conducted a highly disputed referendum, which was vastly considered to be a sham vote.

== Demographics ==
As of the 2001 Ukrainian census, Serebrianka had a population of 969 inhabitants. It is estimated that the majority of the population are ethnic Ukrainians, of whom half are native Russian speakers. Large Crimean Tatar and Russian communities also exist in the village, smaller minorities are Belarusians and Armenians. The primary language composition was as follows:

First languages in Serebrianka
	percent
Russian	56.9%
Ukrainian	25.8%
Crimean Tatar	14.7%
Belarusian	1.1%
Armenian	0.7%
others	0.8%

== Notable people ==
- Volodymyr Balukh (born 1971), Ukrainian nationalist and political activist
