= Novoselivske =

Novoselivske Новоселівське — Новосёловское
- Urban-type settlement
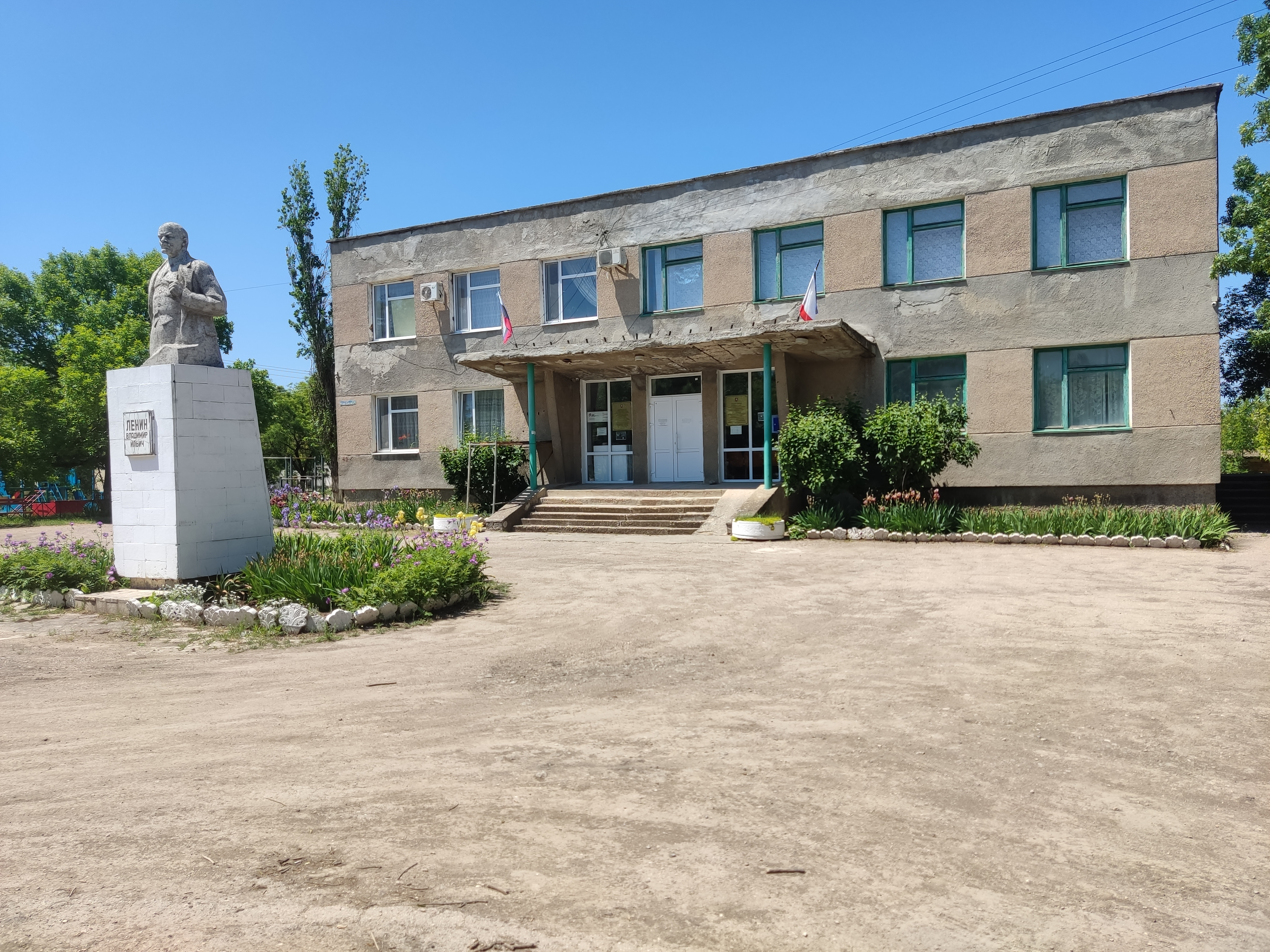

- Location of Novoselivske in Crimea Novoselivske (Crimea)
- Coordinates: 45°26′30″N 33°35′57″E
- Republic: Crimea
- District: Rozdolne Raion
- Town status: 1962

Government
  - Town Head: Maryna Buhaiova
- Elevation: 76 m (249 ft)

Population (2014)
  - Total: 3,179
- Time zone: UTC+4 (MSK)
- Postal code: 96274
- Area code: +380
- Website: http://rada.gov.ua/

Novoselivske (Ukrainian: Новоселівське; Russian: Новосёловское; Crimean Tatar: Montanay, Монтанай; Yiddish: פֿרײַדאָרפ, Fraydorf) (until 1944 Fraydorf) is an urban-type settlement in Rozdolne Raion (district) of the Autonomous Republic of Crimea of Ukraine, currently occupied by Russia as the Republic of Crimea. As of the 2001 Ukrainian Census, its population was 3,186. Current population: 3,179 (2014 Census).

== Demographics ==
As of the only census conducted in indenpendent Ukraine in 2001, the town had a population of 3,186 inhabitants. Despite the town being mosty Russophone, it is estimated that the respective ethnic Ukrainian, Russian and Crimean Tatar populations are roughly of equal size, while small Belarusian, Moldovan, Gypsy and Armenian communities also exist in the settlement. The exact native language composition was as follows:

First languages in Novoselivkse
	percent
Russian	58.4%
Crimean Tatar	24.4%
Ukrainian	15.0%
Belarusian	0.3%
Romani	0.3%
Moldovan	0.1%
Armenian	0.1%
others	1.4%

== See also ==
- Rozdolne, the other urban-type settlement in Rozdolne Raion of Crimea
