= Rozdolne =

Rozdolne Роздольне (in Ukrainian) Раздольное (in Russian) Aqşeyh (in Crimean Tatar)
- Urban-type settlement
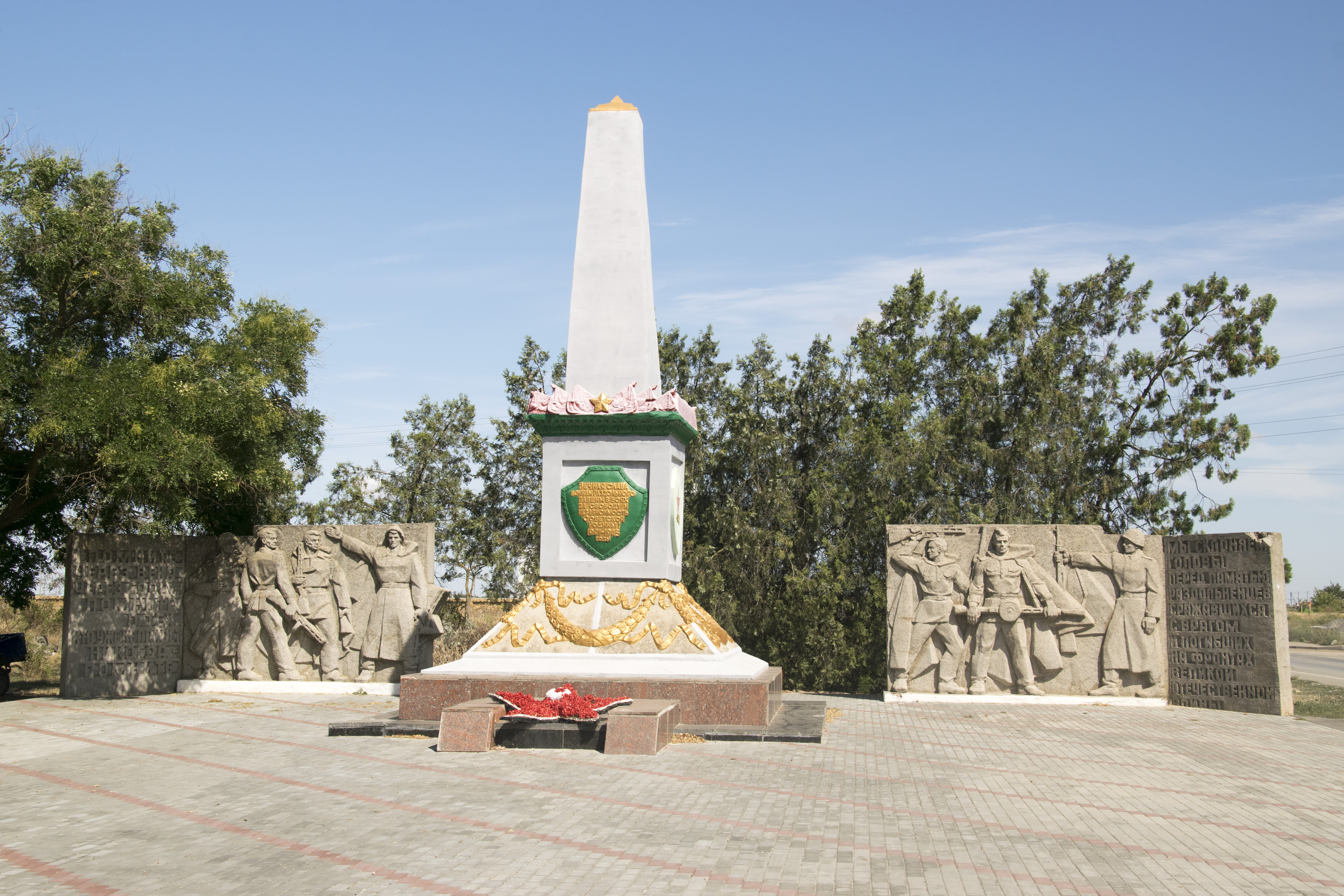

- Location of Rozdolne in Crimea Rozdolne (Crimea)
- Coordinates: 45°46′12″N 33°29′17″E
- Country: Ukraine
- Republic: Crimea
- District: Rozdolne Raion
- Town status: 1960

Government
  - Town Head: Mykhailo Petrychenko

Area
  - Total: 4.574 km^{2} (1.766 sq mi)
- Elevation: 12 m (39 ft)

Population (2014)
  - Total: 7,352
  - Density: 1,607/km^{2} (4,163/sq mi)
- Time zone: UTC+2 (EET)
  - Summer (DST): UTC+3
- Postal code: 96200
- Area code: +380 6553
- Website: http://rada.gov.ua/

Rozdolne (Ukrainian: Роздольне; Russian: Раздольное; Crimean Tatar: Aqşeyh [Акъшейх]; German: Deutsch-Akscheich; until December 1944, Aksheykh (Ак-Шейх) is an urban-type settlement in the Autonomous Republic of Crimea, a territory recognized by a majority of countries as part of Ukraine and incorporated by Russia as the Republic of Crimea. The town also serves as the administrative center of the Rozdolne Raion (district), housing the district's local administration buildings.

As of the 2001 Ukrainian Census, its population was 8,163. Current population: 7,352 (2014 Census).

The village of Deutsch-Akscheich (Ак-Шеих Немецкий) was founded by Black Sea German settlers from the Berdyansk area in 1897.

== Demographics ==
As of the 2001 Ukrainian census, Rozdolne had a population of 8,163 inhabitants. The linguistic composition was as follows:

First languages in Rozdolne
	percent
Russian	81.9%
Ukrainian	9.6%
Crimean Tatar	7.0%
Armenian	0.5%
Belarusian	0.1%
others	0.8%

== Notable people ==
- Ruslan Mamutov (1993-2022), Ukrainian football player
- Svitlana Taratorina (born 1985), Ukrainian writer and journalist

== See also ==
- Novoselivske, the other urban-type settlement in Rozdolne Raion of Crimea
