= Volodymyr Balukh =

Ukrainian political activist

Volodymyr Hryhorovych Balukh
- Володимир Григорович Балух
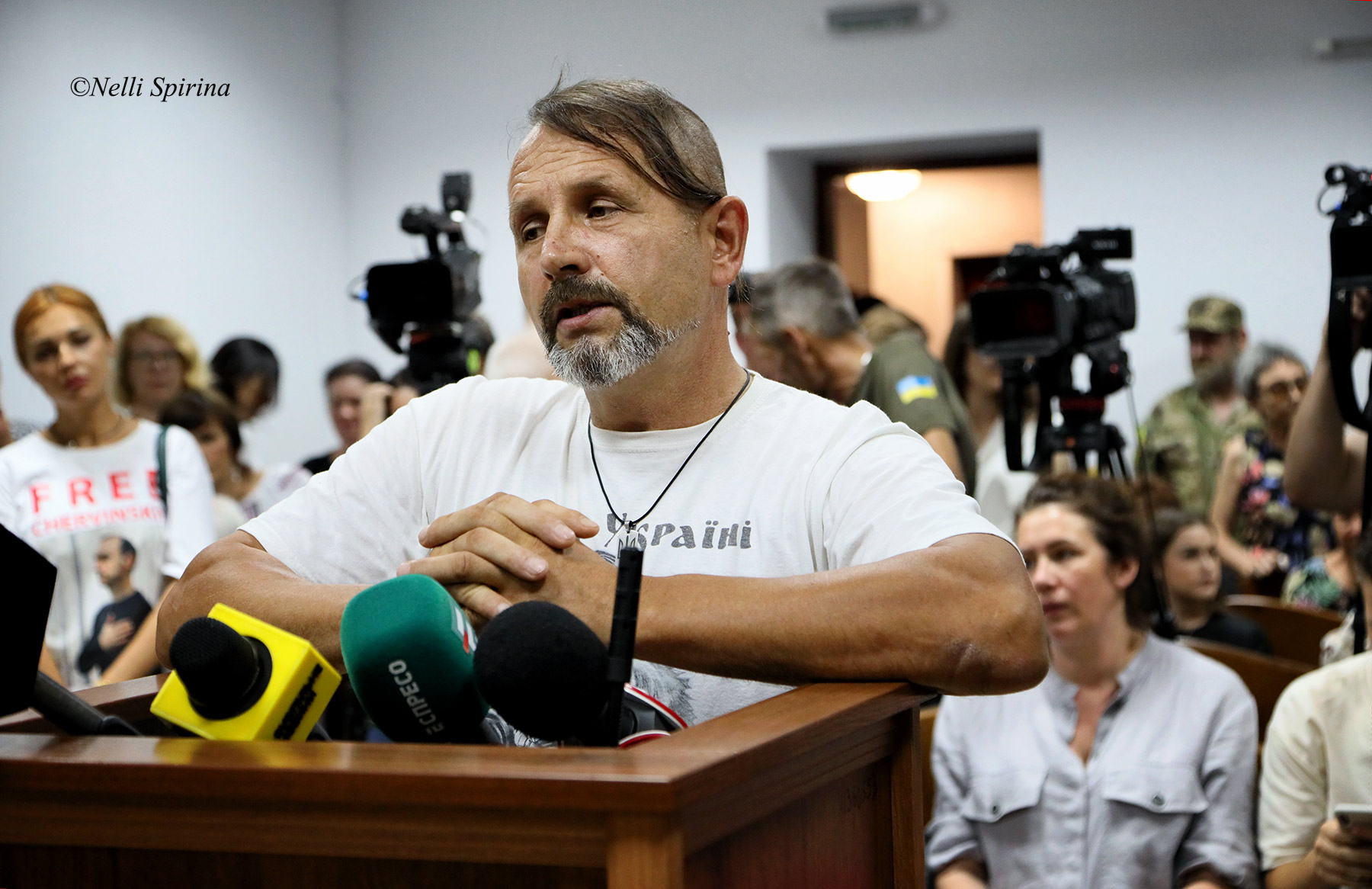
- Balukh in July 2024.
- Born: 8 February 1971 (age 55); Serebrianka, Rozdolne Raion, Crimean Oblast, Ukrainian SSR, Soviet Union (now Ukraine)
- Alma mater: Crimean Agrotechnological University
- Military career
- Allegiance: Ukraine
- Branch: Territorial Defense Forces
- Service years: 2022 – present
- Conflicts: Russo-Ukrainian war; Full-scale invasion of Ukraine

Volodymyr Hryhorovych Balukh (Ukrainian: Володимир Григорович Балух; born 8 February 1971) is a Ukrainian political activist, businessman and former political prisoner of the Russian Federation.

== Early life and career ==
Volodymyr Balukh was born into an ethnically Ukrainian family in the Crimean village of Serebrianka, Rozdolne raion. He graduated from the Crimean Agrotechnological University in Simferopol and worked as a water conservation engineer at the local collective farm. Balukh owns a large farmstead in his native village, as well as two plots of land that he used for wheat cultivation.

== Political activism and resistance to the Russian occupation ==
In 2006 and 2010, Balukh campaigned for the Verkhovna Rada of Crimea as a candidate for the Congress of Ukrainian Nationalists.

Following Russia's unilateral annexation of Crimea and despite the threat of arbitrary arrest and prosecution, he became notorious for openly displaying his hardline pro-Ukrainian stances, as well as for categorically refusing to become a naturalized Russian citizen. Between 2015 and 2016, Balukh was taken into custody multiple times for refusing to take down the Ukrainian flag on his property, as well as for displaying a sign in honor of the 'Heavenly Hundred', a term used for the 108 deceased victims of violent government crackdowns during the Revolution of Dignity.

== Criminal cases, convictions and prisoner exchange ==
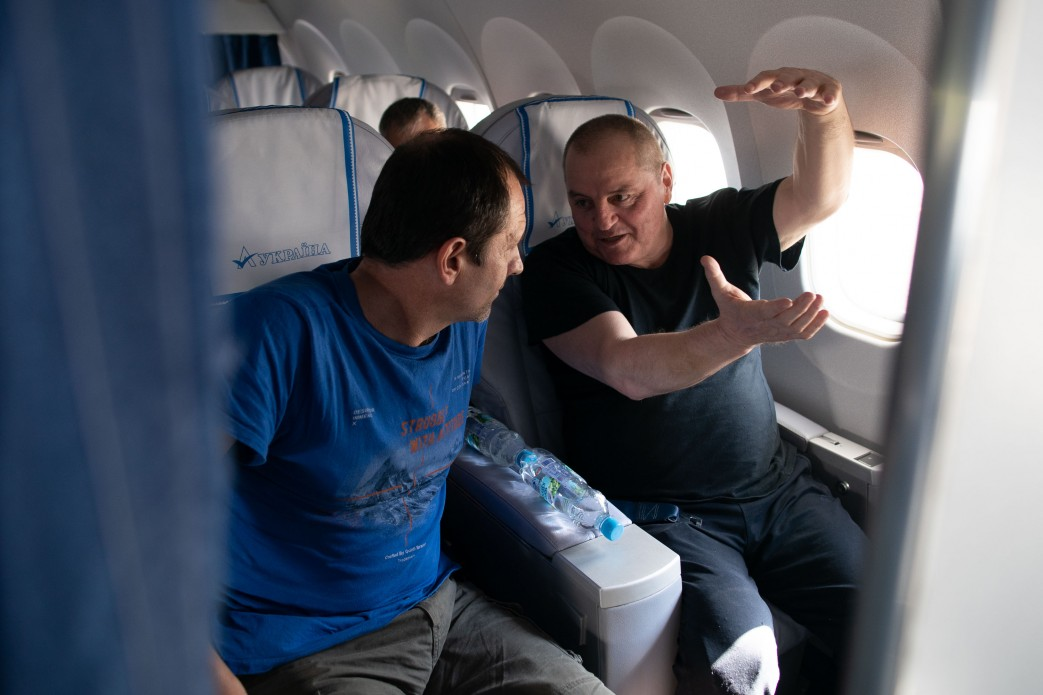
Balukh (left) after being released from Russian captivity.

Balukh's home was subject to two raids by the Russian police in 2015 alone, with the latter search resulting in his arrest. Following his first arrest, he was beaten and imprisoned for ten days, and subsequently sentenced to 320 hours of community service for allegedly insulting a police officer and stealing spare parts for a tractor in a neighboring village.

On 9 December 2016, Russian law enforcement officers raided Balukh's house again. The hour-long search resulted in Balukh's repeated arrest, after the FSB claimed to have found 90 cartridges and several explosives in his attic. The local Russian-installed court of the Rozdolne district extended his pre-trial detention multiple times.

Despite the lack of evidence and the court's refusal to investigate the origin of the confiscated ammunition, Balukh was sentenced to three years and seven months in prison and a 10,000 rouble fine. On 19 March 2018, he entered a hunger strike. On 5 June, his prison sentence was extended to five years. Many Crimean human rights organizations criticized the decision, calling Balukh a de facto political prisoner.

On 7 September 2019, he was released from captivity as part of a prisoner exchange between Ukraine and the Russian Federation.

== Military service ==
After Russia launched its full-scale invasion of Ukraine in early 2022, Balukh and many other exiled Crimean activists joined the ranks of the Ukrainian Armed Forces, including Olexandr Kolchenko, Oleh Sentsov, Pavlo Kazarin, Serhiy Kostynskyi, Oleksandr Liev and Ismail Ramazanov. In 2026, Balukh was reportedly beaten at a military recruitment center in Kyiv. The Kyiv City Territorial Center for Recruiting and Social Support said that Balukh was a "violator of military registration" but denied that its personnel had abused him.
