= Ruslan Mamutov =

Ukrainian footballer (1993–2022)

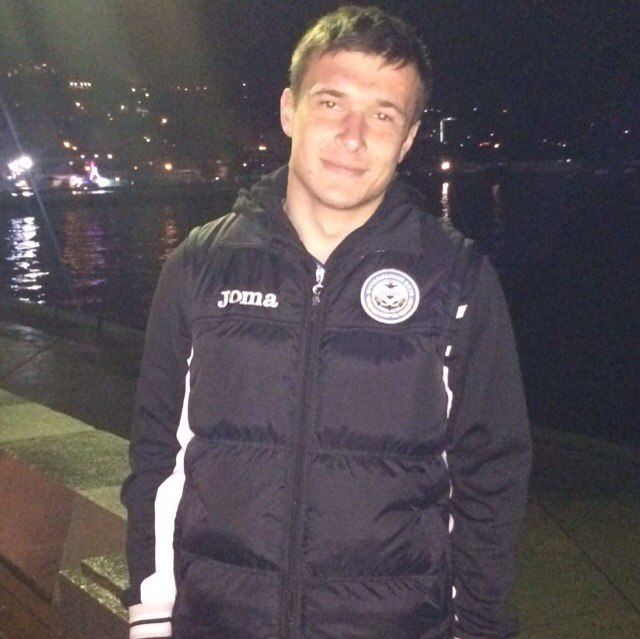
- A picture of Ruslan Mamutov

Personal information
- Full name: Ruslan Alimovych Mamutov
- Date of birth: 19 August 1993
- Place of birth: Rozdolne, AR Crimea, Ukraine
- Date of death: 10 January 2022 (aged 28)
- Place of death: Simferopol, AR Crimea, Ukraine
- Height: 1.74 m (5 ft 8 1/2 in)
- Position: Midfielder

Youth career
- 2006–2007: Olimpik Donetsk
- 2008–2010: Metalurh Donetsk

Senior career*
Years	Team	Apps	(Gls)
2010–2014	Metalurh Donetsk	4	(0)
2014	→ Stal Alchevsk (loan)	16	(2)
2015	Skif Simferopol		
2016	Ocean Kerch	2	(0)
2017	Istochnoye	2	(0)
2018	Adalet-Taraktash		
2019	Fregat		
2019	Triad-Monte	6	(0)
2019–2020	West Armenia	5	(1)
2020	Kyzyltash Bakhchisaray		

International career^{‡}
2010	Ukraine-17	2	(0)
- * Club domestic league appearances and goals as of 1 May 2015 ‡ National team caps and goals as of 1 May 2015

Ruslan Mamutov (Ukrainian: Руслан Алімович Мамутов; 19 August 1993 – 10 January 2022) was a Ukrainian professional football midfielder.

== Career ==
Mamutov is product of youth team systems of FC Olimpik Donetsk and FC Metalurh Donetsk. He made his debut for FC Metalurh played in the start squad in the game against FC Dynamo Kyiv on 6 October 2013 in the Ukrainian Premier League.
