= Crimea =

Peninsula in Europe

Crimean Peninsula
- Location of Crimea

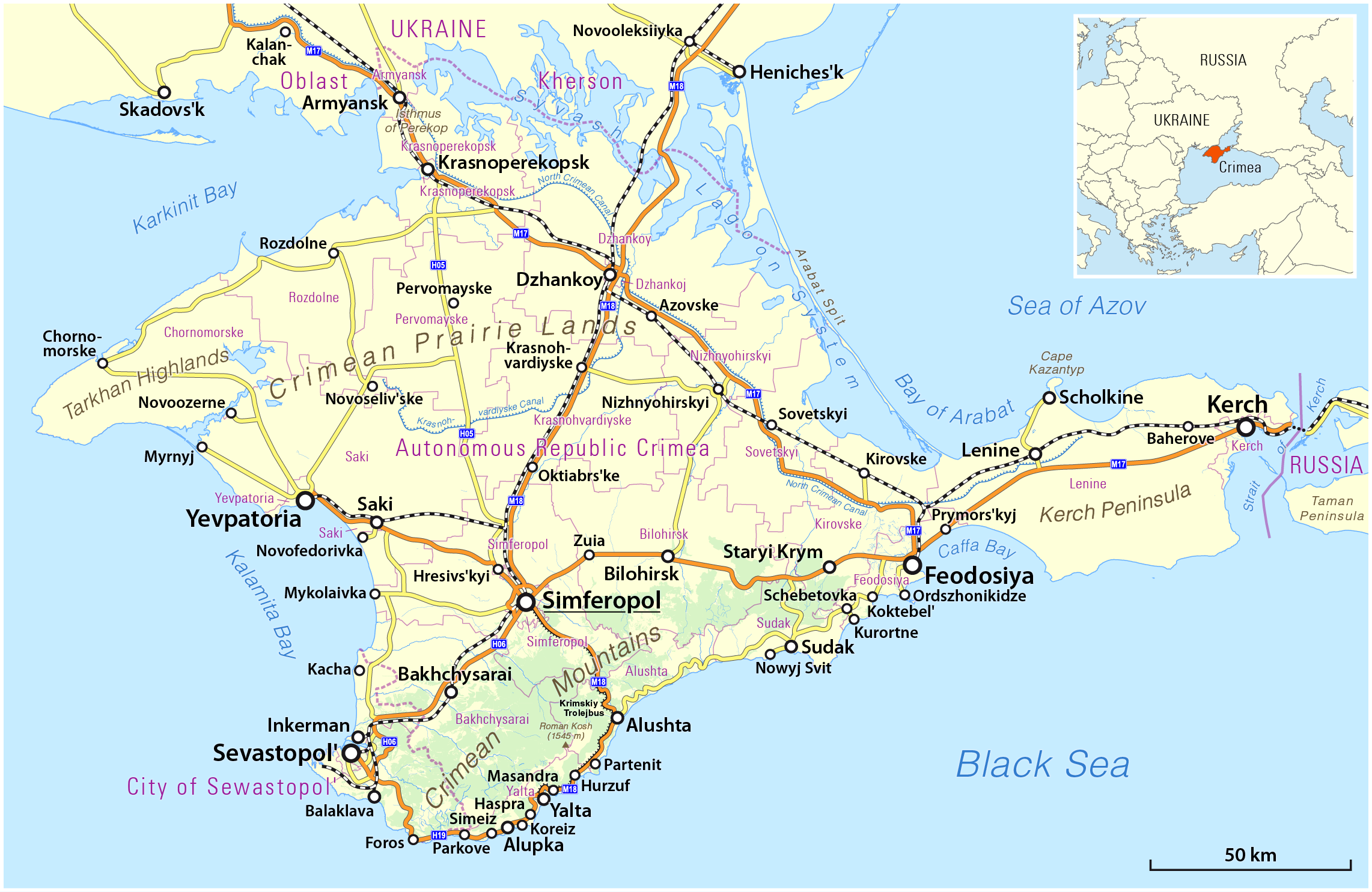
- Map of the Crimean Peninsula

Geography
- Location: Eastern Europe
- Coordinates: 45.3°N 34.4°E
- Adjacent to: Black Sea; Sea of Azov
- Area: 27,000 km^{2} (10,000 sq mi)
- Highest elevation: 1,545 m (5069 ft)
- Highest point: Roman-Kosh
- Status: Internationally recognised as Ukrainian territory occupied by Russia (see Political status of Crimea)
- Ukraine (de jure)
- Northern Arabat Spit (Henichesk Raion); Autonomous Republic of Crimea; Sevastopol
- Largest settlement: Sevastopol
- Russia (de facto control)
- Republic of Crimea; Sevastopol
- Largest settlement: Sevastopol

Demographics
- Demonym: Crimean
- Population: ▲2,416,856 (2021)
- Pop. density: 84.6/km^{2} (219.1/sq mi)

Additional information
- ISO code: UA-43

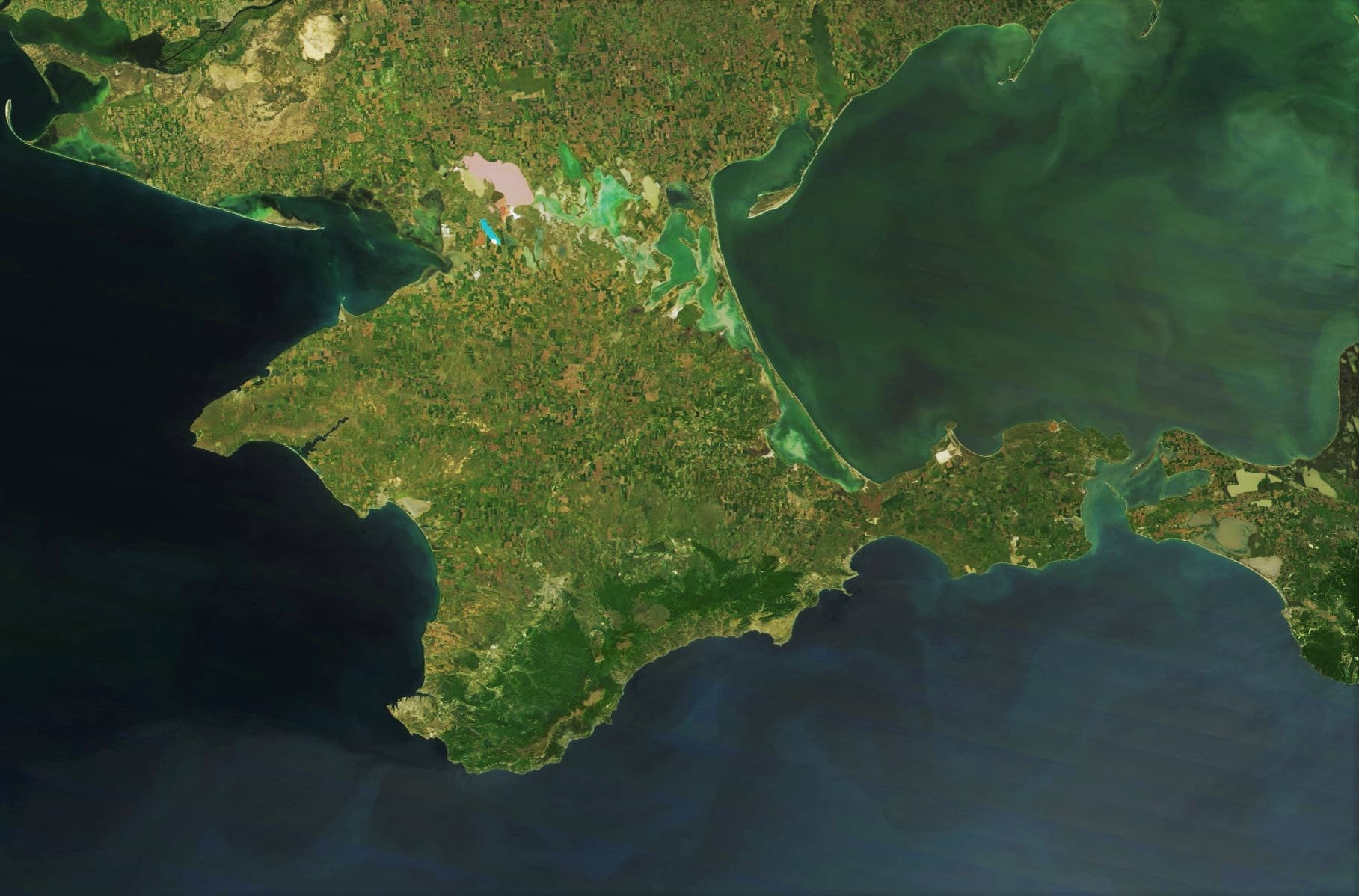
May 2015 satellite image of the Crimean Peninsula

Crimea (Note: Russian: Крым, romanised: Krym; Ukrainian: Крим, romanised: Krym; Crimean Tatar: Qırım, Къырым; Ancient Greek: Κιμμερία, Ταυρική, romanised: Kimmería / Taurikḗ) (/kraɪˈmiːə/ kry-MEE-ə) is a peninsula in Eastern Europe, on the northern coast of the Black Sea, almost entirely surrounded by the Black Sea and the smaller Sea of Azov. The Isthmus of Perekop connects the peninsula to Kherson Oblast in mainland Ukraine. To the east, the Crimean Bridge, constructed in 2018, spans the Strait of Kerch, linking the peninsula with Krasnodar Krai in Russia. The Arabat Spit, located to the northeast, is a narrow strip of land that separates the Syvash lagoons from the Sea of Azov. Across the Black Sea to the west lies Romania and to the south is Turkey. The population is 2.4 million, and the largest city is Sevastopol. The region, internationally recognised as part of Ukraine, has been under Russian occupation since 2014.

Called the Tauric Peninsula until the early modern period, Crimea has historically been at the boundary between the classical world and the steppe. Greeks colonised its southern fringe and were absorbed by the Roman and Byzantine Empires and successor states while remaining culturally Greek. Some cities became trading colonies of Genoa, until conquered by the Ottoman Empire. Throughout this time the interior was occupied by a changing cast of steppe nomads, coming under the control of the Golden Horde in the 13th century from which the Crimean Khanate emerged as a successor state. In the 15th century, the Khanate became a dependency of the Ottoman Empire. Lands controlled by Russia (Note: Russia underwent a series of political changes in the period of the raids. The Grand Duchy of Moscow overthrew Turco-Mongol lordship, and expanded into the Tsardom of Russia in 1547. From 1721, following the reforms of Peter the Great, it was the Russian Empire.) and Poland-Lithuania were often the target of slave raids during this period.

In 1783, after the Russo-Turkish War (1768–1774), the Russian Empire annexed Crimea. Crimea's strategic position led to the 1854 Crimean War and many short lived regimes following the 1917 Russian Revolution. When the Bolsheviks secured Crimea, it became an autonomous soviet republic within the Russian Soviet Federative Socialist Republic. It was occupied by Germany during World War II. When the Soviets retook it in 1944, Crimean Tatars were ethnically cleansed and deported under the orders of Joseph Stalin, in what has been described as a cultural genocide. Crimea was downgraded to an oblast in 1945. In 1954, the USSR transferred the oblast to the Ukrainian Soviet Socialist Republic on the 300th anniversary of the Pereyaslav Treaty in 1654.

After Ukrainian independence in 1991, most of the peninsula was reorganised as the Autonomous Republic of Crimea. The Soviet fleet in Crimea was in contention, but a 1997 treaty allowed Russia to continue basing its fleet in Sevastopol. In 2014, the peninsula was occupied by Russian forces and annexed by Russia, but most countries recognise Crimea as Ukrainian territory.

== Name ==
The spelling "Crimea" is from the Italian form, la Crimea, since at least the 17th century and the "Crimean peninsula" becomes current during the 18th century, gradually replacing the classical name of Tauric Peninsula in the course of the 19th century. In English usage since the early modern period the Crimean Khanate is referred to as Crim Tartary. Today, the Crimean Tatar name of the peninsula is Qırım, while the Russian is Крым (Krym), and the Ukrainian is Крим (Krym).

The city Staryi Krym ('Old Crimea'), served as a capital of the Crimean province of the Golden Horde. Between 1315 and 1329 CE, the Arab writer Abū al-Fidā recounted a political fight in 1300–1301 CE which resulted in a rival's decapitation and his head being sent "to the Crimea", apparently in reference to the peninsula, although some sources hold that the name of the capital was extended to the entire peninsula at some point during Ottoman suzerainty (1441–1783).

The word Qırım is derived from the Turkic term qirum ("fosse, trench"), from qori- ("to fence, protect"). Another classical name for Crimea, Tauris or Taurica, is from the Greek Ταυρική (Taurikḗ), after the peninsula's Scytho-Cimmerian inhabitants, the Tauri. The name was revived by the Russian Empire during the mass hellenisation of Crimean Tatar place names after the annexation of the Crimean Khanate, including both the peninsula and mainland territories now in Ukraine's Kherson and Zaporizhzhia oblasts.

In 1764 imperial authorities established the Taurida Oblast (Tavricheskaia oblast), and reorganised it as the Taurida Governorate in 1802. While the Soviets replaced it with Krym (Ukrainian: Крим; Russian: Крым) depriving it of official status since 1921, it is still used by some institutions in Crimea, such as the Taurida National University established by the Crimean Regional Government in 1918, the Tavriya Simferopol football club so named in 1963, and the Tavrida federal highway being built under Russian occupation from 2017.

Other suggestions either unsupported or contradicted by sources, apparently based on similarity in sound, include:

1. the name of the Cimmerians, although this derivation is however no longer generally held.
2. a derivation from the Greek Cremnoi (Κρημνοί, in post-classical Koiné Greek pronunciation, Crimni, i.e., "the Cliffs", a port on Lake Maeotis (Sea of Azov) cited by Herodotus in The Histories 4.20.1 and 4.110.2). However, Herodotus identifies the port not in Crimea, but as being on the west coast of the Sea of Azov. No evidence has been identified that this name was ever in use for the peninsula.
3. The Turkic term (e.g., in Turkish: Kırım) is related to the Mongolian appellation kerm "wall", but sources indicate that the Mongolian appellation of the Crimean peninsula of Qaram is phonetically incompatible with kerm/kerem and therefore deriving from another original term.

Strabo (Geography vii 4.3, xi. 2.5), Polybius, (Histories 4.39.4), and Ptolemy (Geographia. II, v 9.5) refer variously to the Strait of Kerch as the Κιμμερικὸς Βόσπορος (Kimmerikos Bosporos, romanised spelling: Bosporus Cimmerius), its easternmost part as the Κιμμέριον Ἄκρον (Kimmerion Akron, Roman name: Promontorium Cimmerium), as well as to the city of Cimmerium and thence the name of the Kingdom of the Cimmerian Bosporus (Κιμμερικοῦ Βοσπόρου).

== History ==
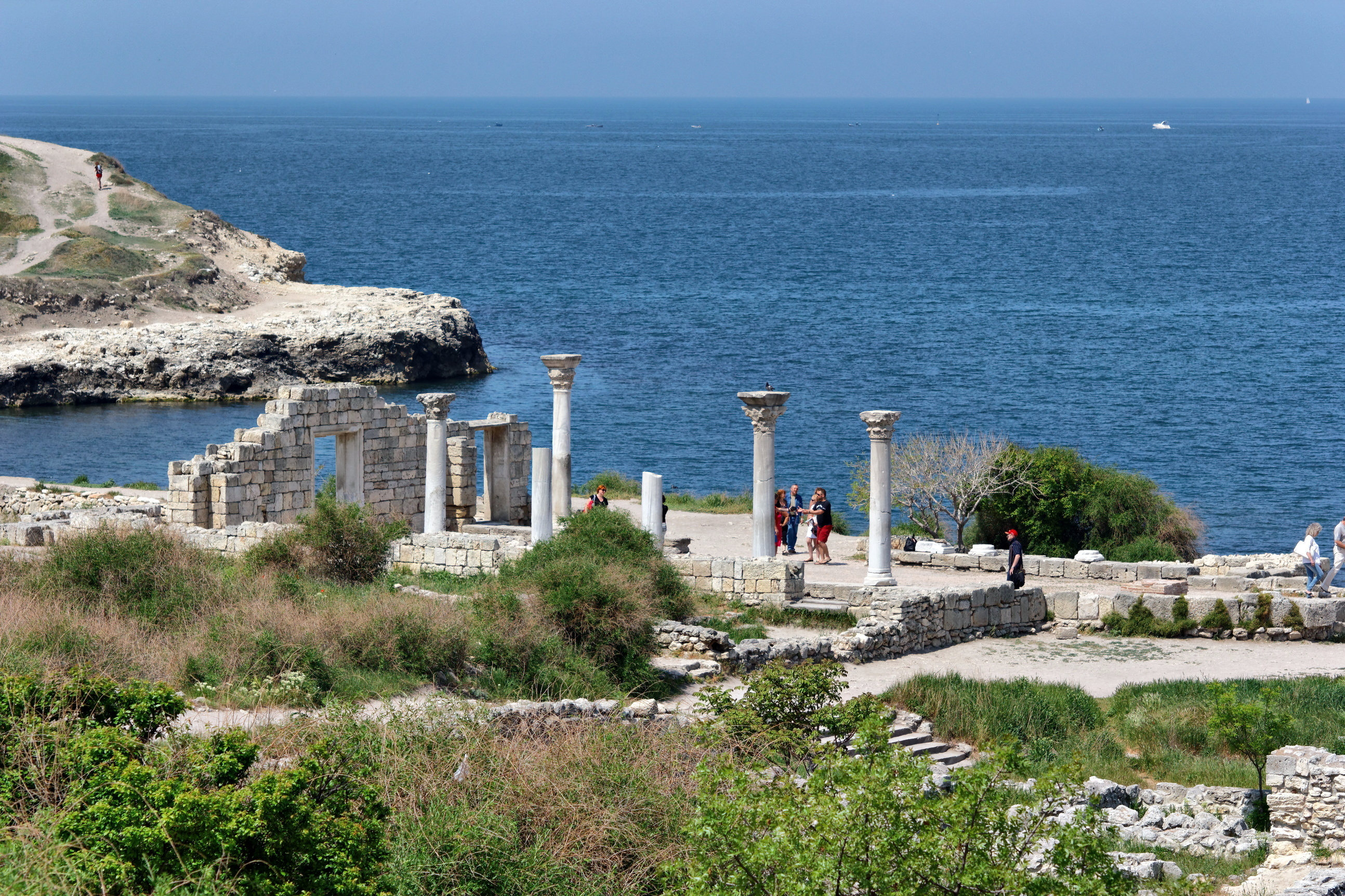
Ruins of the ancient Greek colony of Chersonesus

=== Ancient history ===
The recorded history of Crimea begins around 5th century BCE when several Greek colonies were established on its south coast, the most important of which was Chersonesos near modern-day Sevastopol, with Scythians and Tauri in the hinterland to the north. The Tauri gave the name the Tauric Peninsula, which Crimea was called into the early modern period. The southern coast gradually consolidated into the Bosporan Kingdom which was annexed by Pontus in Asia Minor and later became a client kingdom of Rome from 63 BCE to 341 CE.

=== Medieval history ===
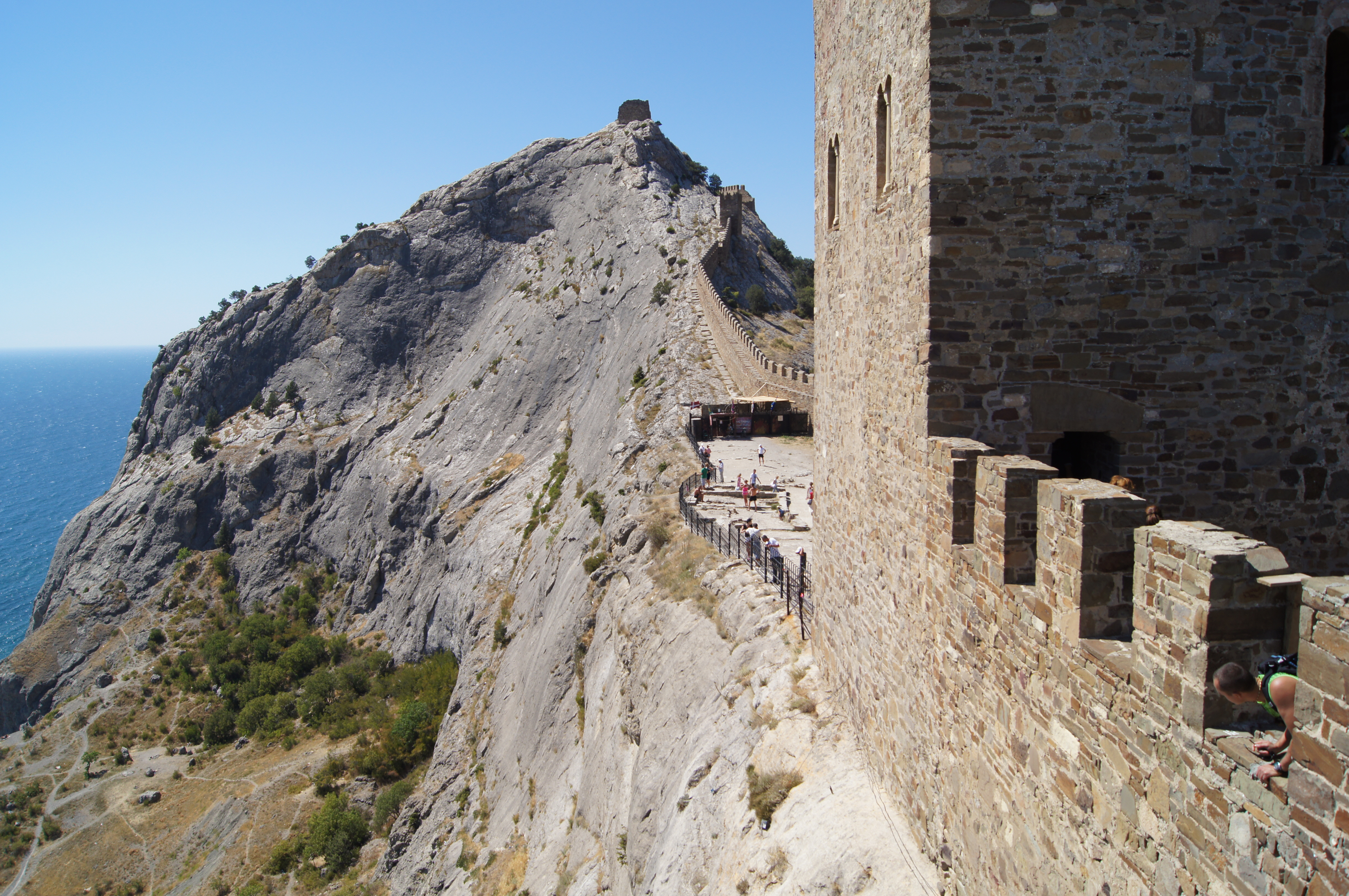
Genoese fortress in Sudak, 13th century, Republic of Genoa, originally a fortified Byzantine town, seventh century

The south coast remained Greek in culture for almost two thousand years including under Roman successor states, the Byzantine Empire (341–1204 CE), the Empire of Trebizond (1204–1461 CE), and the independent Principality of Theodoro (ended 1475 CE). In the 13th century, some Crimean port cities were controlled by the Venetians and by the Genovese, but the interior was much less stable, enduring a long series of conquests and invasions. In the medieval period, it was partially conquered by Kievan Rus' whose prince was baptised at Sevastopol starting the Christianisation of Kievan Rus'.

=== Mongol Conquest (1238–1449) ===
The north and centre of Crimea fell to the Mongol Golden Horde, although the south coast was still controlled by the Christian Principality of Theodoro and Genoese colonies. The Genoese–Mongol Wars were fought between the 13th and 15th centuries for control of south Crimea.

=== Crimean Khanate (1443–1783) ===
The Crimean Khanate after the destruction of the Great Horde in 1502

In the 1440s the Crimean Khanate formed out of the collapse of the horde but quite rapidly itself became subject to the Ottoman Empire, which also conquered the coastal areas which had kept independent of the Khanate. A major source of prosperity in these times was frequent raids into Eastern Europe for slaves.

=== Russian Empire (1783–1917) ===
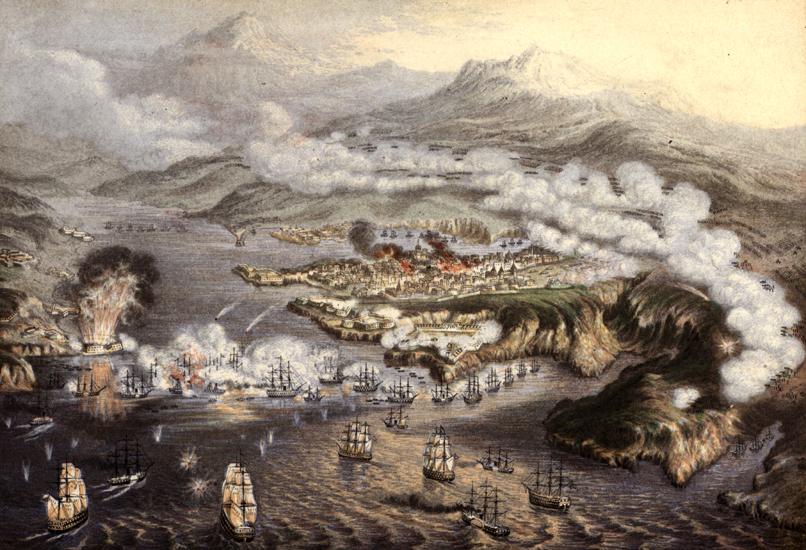
The 11-month siege of Sevastopol during the Crimean War

In 1774, the Ottoman Empire was defeated by Catherine the Great with the Treaty of Küçük Kaynarca making the Tatars of the Crimea politically independent. Catherine the Great's incorporation of the Crimea in 1783 into the Russian Empire increased Russia's power in the Black Sea area.

From 1853 to 1856, the strategic position of the peninsula in controlling the Black Sea meant that it was the site of the principal engagements of the Crimean War, where Russia lost to a French-led alliance.

=== Russian Civil War (1917–1921) ===
During the Russian Civil War, Crimea changed hands many times and was where Wrangel's anti-Bolshevik White Army made their last stand. Many anti-Communist fighters and civilians escaped to Istanbul but up to 150,000 were killed in Crimea.

=== Soviet Union (1921–1991) ===
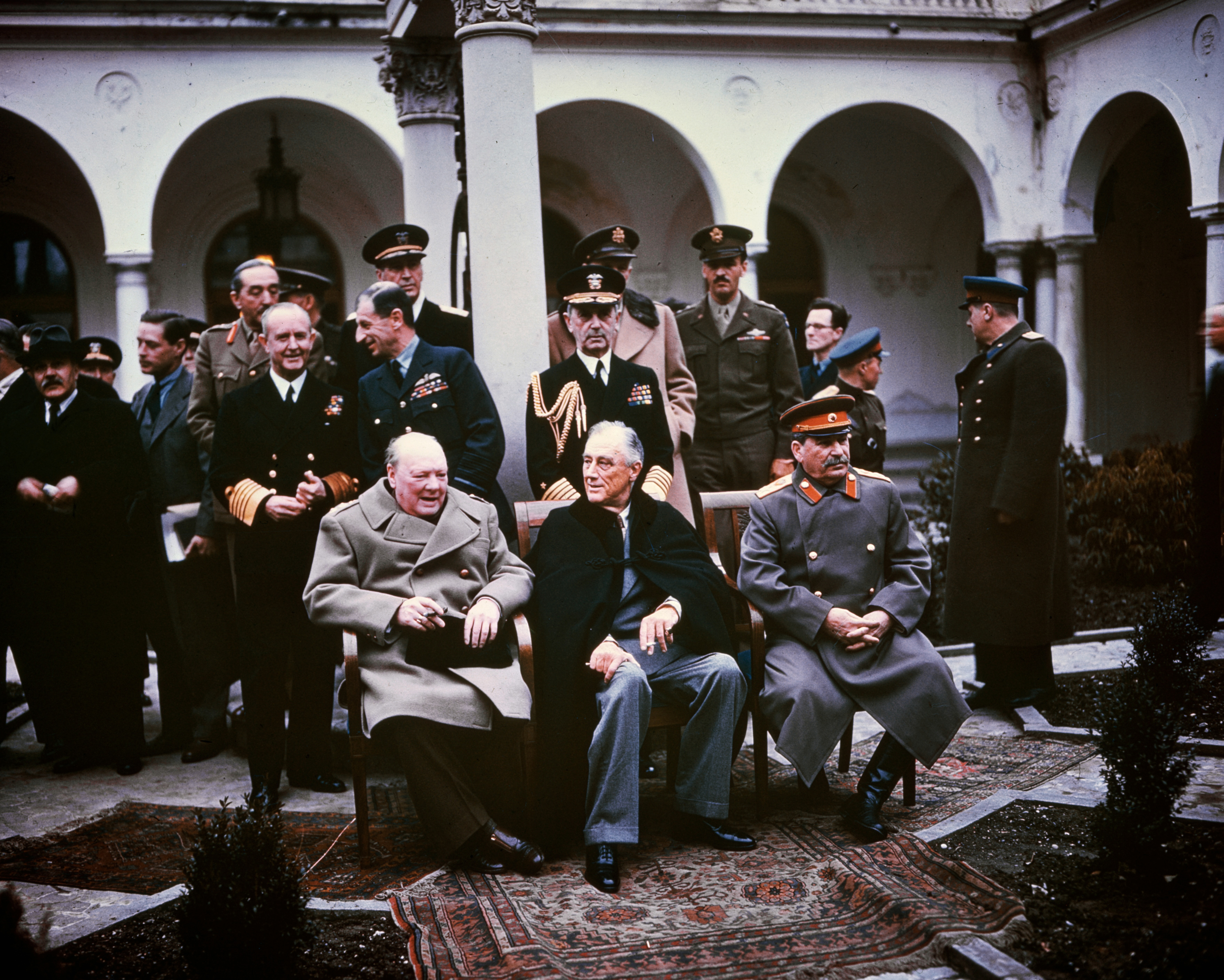
The "Big Three" at the Yalta Conference in Crimea: Winston Churchill, Franklin D. Roosevelt, and Joseph Stalin

In 1921 the Crimean Autonomous Soviet Socialist Republic was created as part of the Russian Soviet Federative Socialist Republic. It was occupied by Germany from 1942 to 1944 during the Second World War. After the Soviets regained control in 1944, they deported the Crimean Tartars and several other nationalities to elsewhere in the USSR. The autonomous republic was dissolved in 1945, and Crimea became an oblast of the Russian SFSR. It was transferred to the Ukrainian SSR in 1954, on the 300th anniversary of the Treaty of Pereyaslav.

=== Independent Ukraine (since 1991) ===
With the dissolution of the Soviet Union and Ukrainian independence in 1991 most of the peninsula was reorganised as the Autonomous Republic of Crimea. A 1997 treaty partitioned the Soviet Black Sea Fleet, allowing Russia to continue basing its fleet in Sevastopol, with the lease extended in 2010.

==== Russian occupation (from 2014) ====
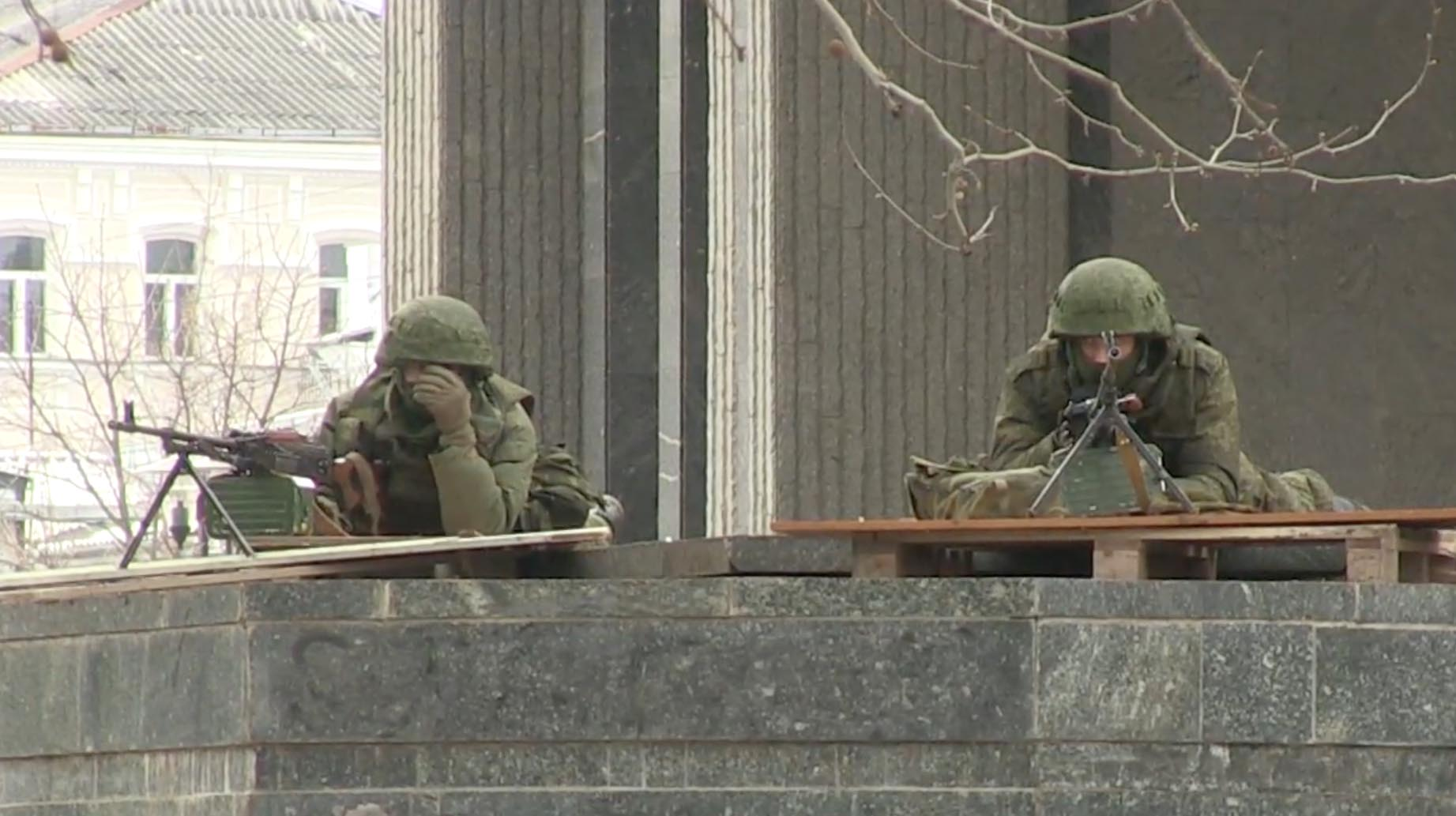
Unmarked Russian soldiers ("Little Green Men") outside the occupied parliament of Crimea

In 2014, Crimea saw demonstrations against the removal of the Russia-leaning Ukrainian president Viktor Yanukovych in Kyiv and protests in support of Euromaidan. Ukrainian historian Volodymyr Holovko estimates 26 February protest in support of the integrity of Ukraine in Simferopol at 12,000 people, opposed by several thousand pro-Russian protesters. On 27 February, Russian forces occupied parliament and government buildings and other strategic points in Crimea and the Russian-organised Republic of Crimea declared independence from Ukraine following an illegal and internationally unrecognised referendum. Russia then annexed Crimea, although most countries (100 votes in favour, 11 against, 58 abstentions) continued to recognise Crimea as part of Ukraine.

== Geography ==
Geography of Crimea

Covering an area of 27,000 km^{2} (10,425 sq mi), Crimea is located on the northern coast of the Black Sea and on the western coast of the Sea of Azov; the only land border is shared with Ukraine's Kherson Oblast on the north. Crimea is almost an island and only connected to the continent by the Isthmus of Perekop, a strip of land about 5–7 kilometres (3.1–4.3 mi) wide.

Much of the natural border between the Crimean Peninsula and the Ukrainian mainland comprises the Syvash or "Rotten Sea", a large system of shallow lagoons stretching along the western shore of the Sea of Azov. Besides the isthmus of Perekop, the peninsula is connected to the Kherson Oblast's Henichesk Raion by bridges over the narrow Chonhar and Henichesk straits and over Kerch Strait to the Krasnodar Krai. The northern part of Arabat Spit is administratively part of Henichesk Raion in Kherson Oblast, including its two rural communities of Shchaslyvtseve and Strilkove. The eastern tip of the Crimean peninsula comprises the Kerch Peninsula, separated from Taman Peninsula on the Russian mainland by the Kerch Strait, which connects the Black Sea with the Sea of Azov, at a width of between 3–13 kilometres (1.9–8.1 mi).

Geographers generally divide the peninsula into three zones: the steppe, the Crimean Mountains, and the Southern Coast.

=== Places ===
Places in Crimea

Given its long history and many conquerors, most towns in Crimea have several names.

West: The Isthmus of Perekop/Perekop/Or Qapi, about 7 km (4 mi) wide, connects Crimea to the mainland. It was often fortified and sometimes garrisoned by the Turks. The North Crimean Canal now crosses it to bring water from the Dnieper. To the west Karkinit Bay separates the Tarkhankut Peninsula from the mainland. On the north side of the peninsula is Chernomorskoe/Kalos Limen. On the south side is the large Donuzlav Bay and the port and ancient Greek settlement of Yevpatoria/Kerkinitis/Gözleve. The coast then runs south to Sevastopol/Chersonesus, a good natural harbor, great naval base and the largest city on the peninsula. At the head of Sevastopol Bay stands Inkermann/Kalamita. South of Sevastopol is the small Heracles Peninsula.

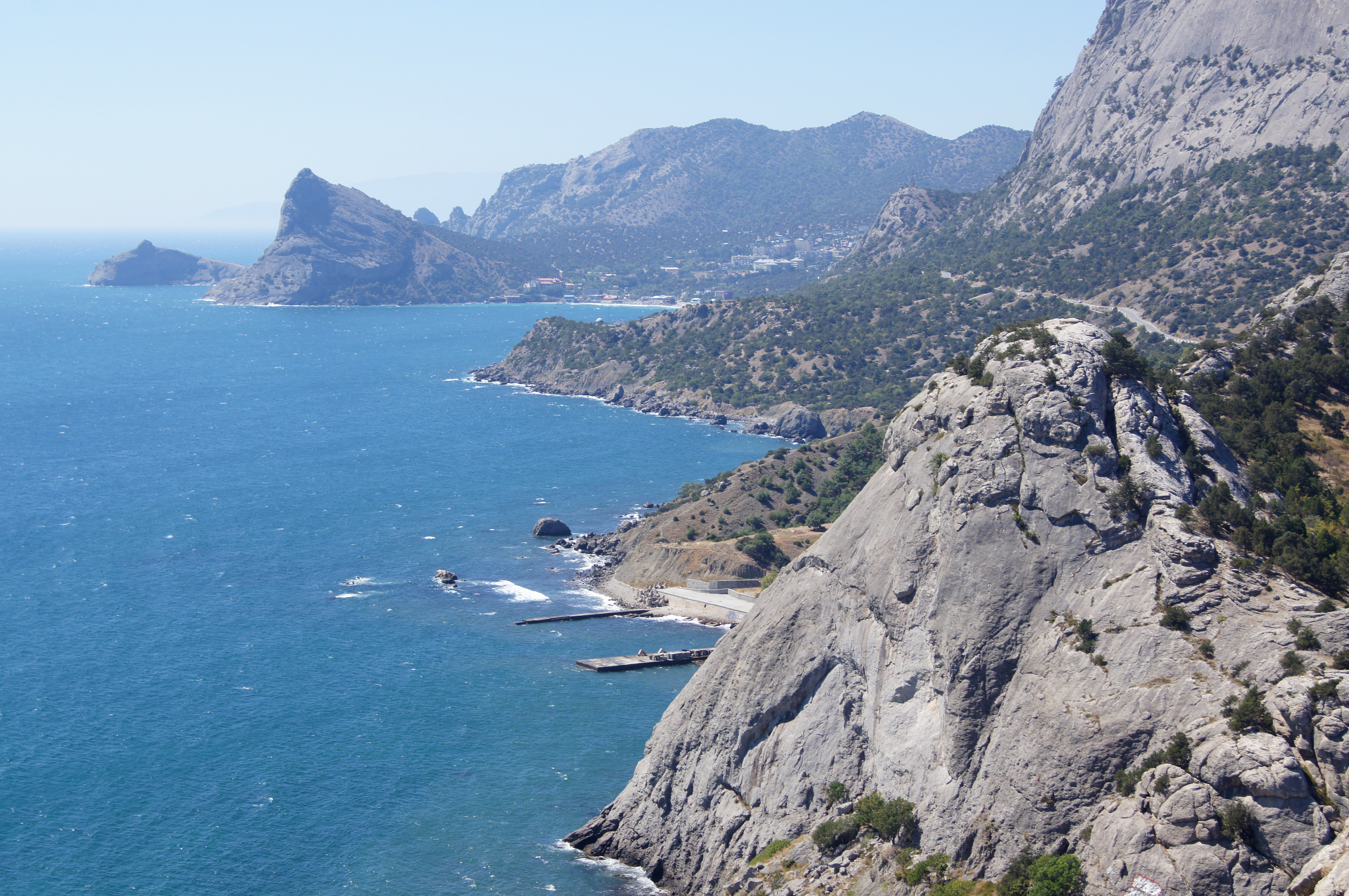
Coastline between Sudak and Novyi Svit

South: In the south, between the Crimean Mountains and the sea runs a narrow coastal strip which was held by the Genoese and (after 1475) by the Turks. Under Russian rule it became a kind of riviera. In Soviet times the many palaces were replaced with dachas and health resorts. From west to east are: Heracles Peninsula; Balaklava/Symbalon/Cembalo, a smaller natural harbor south of Sevastopol; Foros, the southernmost point; Alupka with the Vorontsov Palace (Alupka); Gaspra; Yalta; Gurzuf; Alushta. Further east is Sudak/Sougdia/Soldaia with its Genoese fort. Further east still is Theodosia/Kaffa/Feodosia, once a great slave-mart and a kind of capital for the Genoese and Turks. Unlike the other southern ports, Feodosia has no mountains to its north. At the east end of the 90 km (56 mi) Kerch Peninsula is Kerch/Panticapaeum, once the capital of the Bosporian Kingdom. Just south of Kerch the new Crimean Bridge (opened in 2018) connects Crimea to the Taman Peninsula.

Sea of Azov: There is little on the south shore. The west shore is marked by the Arabat Spit. Behind it is the Syvash or "Putrid Sea", a system of lakes and marshes which in the far north extend west to the Perekop Isthmus. Road- and rail-bridges cross the northern part of Syvash.

Interior: Most of the former capitals of Crimea stood on the north side of the mountains. Mangup/Doros (Gothic, Theodoro). Bakhchysarai (1532–1783). Southeast of Bakhchysarai is the cliff-fort of Chufut-Kale/Qirq Or which was used in more warlike times. Simferopol/Ak-Mechet, the modern capital. Karasu-Bazar/Bilohirsk was a commercial centre. Solkhat/Staryi Krym was the old Tatar capital. Towns on the northern steppe area are all modern, notably Dzhankoi, a major road- and rail-junction.

Rivers: The longest is the Salhyr, which rises southeast of Simferopol and flows north and northeast to the Sea of Azov. The Alma flows west to reach the Black Sea between Yevpatoria and Sevastopol. The shorter Chorna flows west to Sevastopol Bay.

Nearby: East of the Kerch Strait the Ancient Greeks founded colonies at Phanagoria (at the head of Taman Bay), Hermonassa (later Tmutarakan and Taman), Gorgippia (later a Turkish port and now Anapa). At the northeast point of the Sea of Azov at the mouth of the Don River were Tanais, Azak/Azov and now Rostov-on-Don. North of the peninsula the Dnieper turns westward and enters the Black Sea through the east–west Dnieper-Bug Estuary which also receives the Bug River. At the mouth of the Bug stood Olbia. At the mouth of the estuary is Ochakiv. Odesa stands where the coast turns southwest. Further southwest is Tyras/Akkerman/Bilhorod-Dnistrovskyi.

=== Crimean Mountains ===
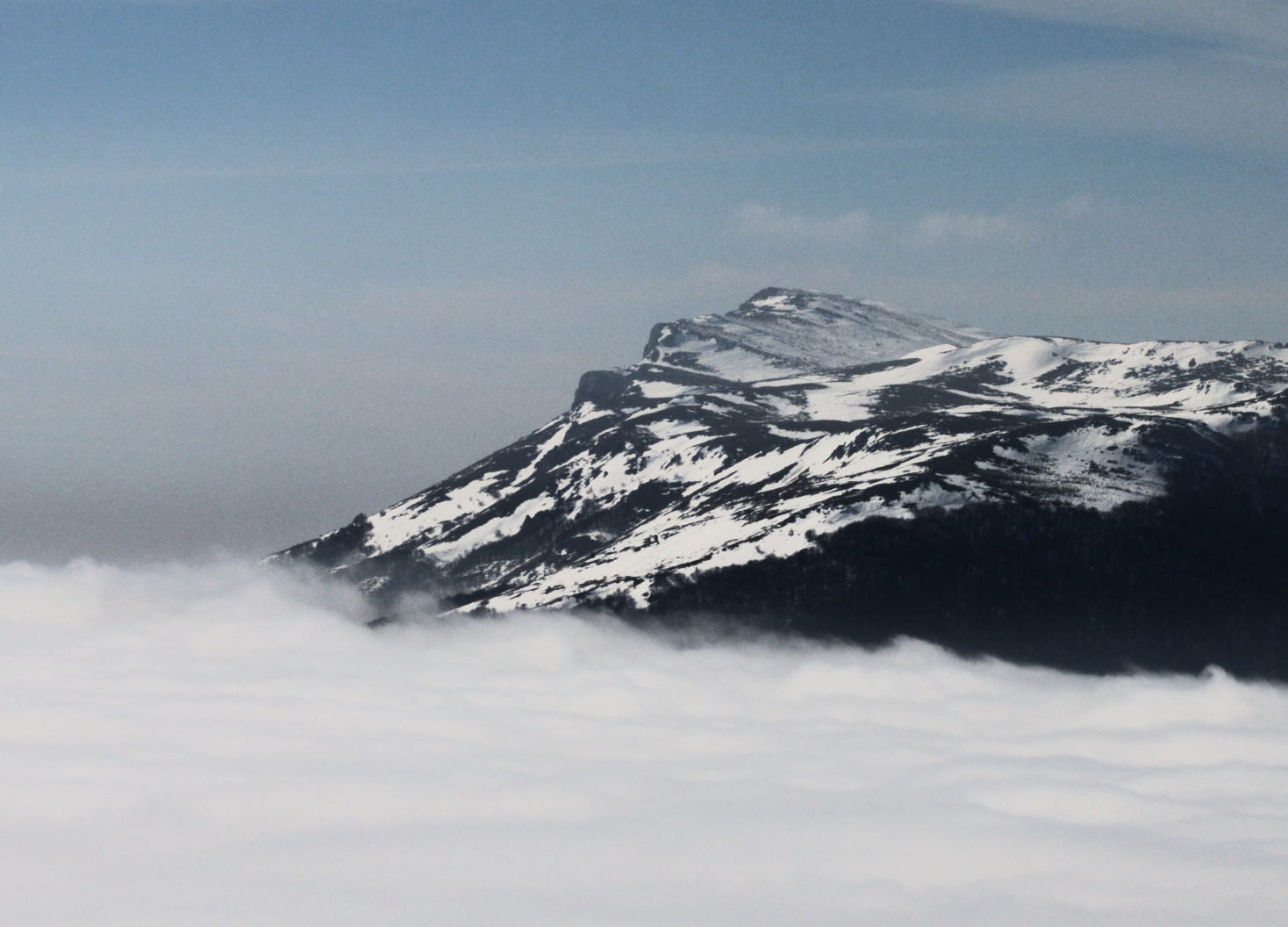
Eclizee-Burun Mountain

The southeast coast is flanked at a distance of 8–12 kilometres (5.0–7.5 mi) from the sea by a parallel range of mountains: the Crimean Mountains. These mountains are backed by secondary parallel ranges.

The main range of these mountains rises with extraordinary abruptness from the deep floor of the Black Sea to an altitude of 600–1,545 metres (1,969–5,069 ft), beginning at the southwest point of the peninsula, called Cape Fiolent. Some Greek myths state that this cape was supposedly crowned with the temple of Artemis where Iphigeneia officiated as priestess. Uchan-su, on the south slope of the mountains, is the highest waterfall in Crimea.

=== Hydrography ===
There are 257 rivers and major streams on the Crimean peninsula; they are primarily fed by rainwater, with snowmelt playing a very minor role. This makes for significant seasonal fluctuation in water flow, with many streams drying up completely during the summer. The largest rivers are the Salhyr (Salğır, Салгир), the Kacha (Кача), the Alma (Альма), and the Belbek (Бельбек). Also important are the Kokozka (Kökköz or Коккозка), the Indole (Indol or Индо́л), the Chorna (Çorğun, Chernaya or Чёрная), the Derekoika (Dereköy or Дерекойка), the Karasu-Bashi (Biyuk-Karasu or Биюк-Карасу) (a tributary of the Salhyr river), the Burulcha (Бурульча) (also a tributary of the Salhyr), the Uchan-su, and the Ulu-Uzen'. The longest river of Crimea is the Salhyr at 204 km (127 mi). The Belbek has the greatest average discharge at 2.16 cubic metres per second (76 cu ft/s). The Alma and the Kacha are the second- and third-longest rivers.

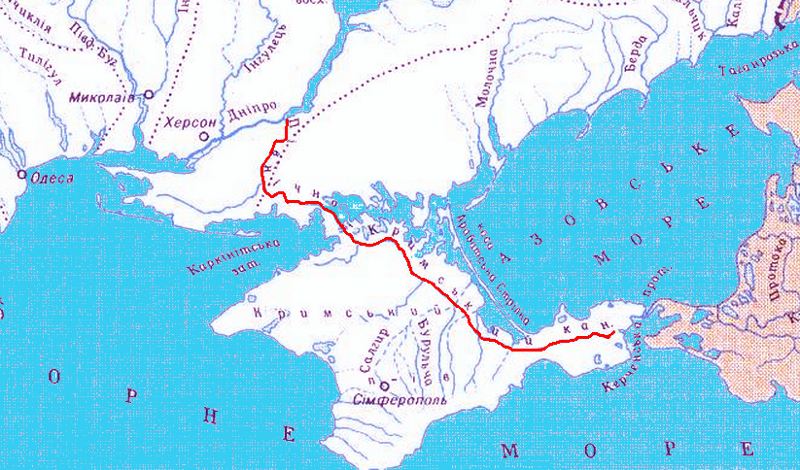
Following Russia's annexation of Crimea, Ukraine blocked the North Crimean Canal, which provided 85% of Crimea's drinking and agriculture water.

There are more than fifty salt lakes and salt pans on the peninsula. The largest of them is Lake Sasyk (Сасык) on the southwest coast; others include Aqtas, Koyashskoye, Kiyatskoe, Kirleutskoe, Kizil-Yar, Bakalskoe, and Donuzlav. The general trend is for the former lakes to become salt pans. Lake Syvash (Sıvaş or Сива́ш) is a system of interconnected shallow lagoons on the north-eastern coast, covering an area of around 2,560 km^{2} (988 sq mi). A number of dams have created reservoirs; among the largest are the Simferopolskoye, Alminskoye, the Taygansky and the Belogorsky just south of Bilohirsk in Bilohirsk Raion. The North Crimea Canal, which transports water from the Dnieper, is the largest of the man-made irrigation channels on the peninsula. Crimea was facing an unprecedented water shortage crisis following the blocking of the canal by Ukraine in 2014. After the 2022 Russian invasion of Ukraine, the flow of water was restored however the destruction of the Kakhovka Dam could lead to problems with water supply again.

=== Steppe ===
Seventy-five percent of the remaining area of Crimea consists of semiarid prairie lands, a southward continuation of the Pontic–Caspian steppe, which slope gently to the northwest from the foothills of the Crimean Mountains. Numerous kurgans, or burial mounds, of the ancient Scythians are scattered across the Crimean steppes.

=== Southern Coast ===
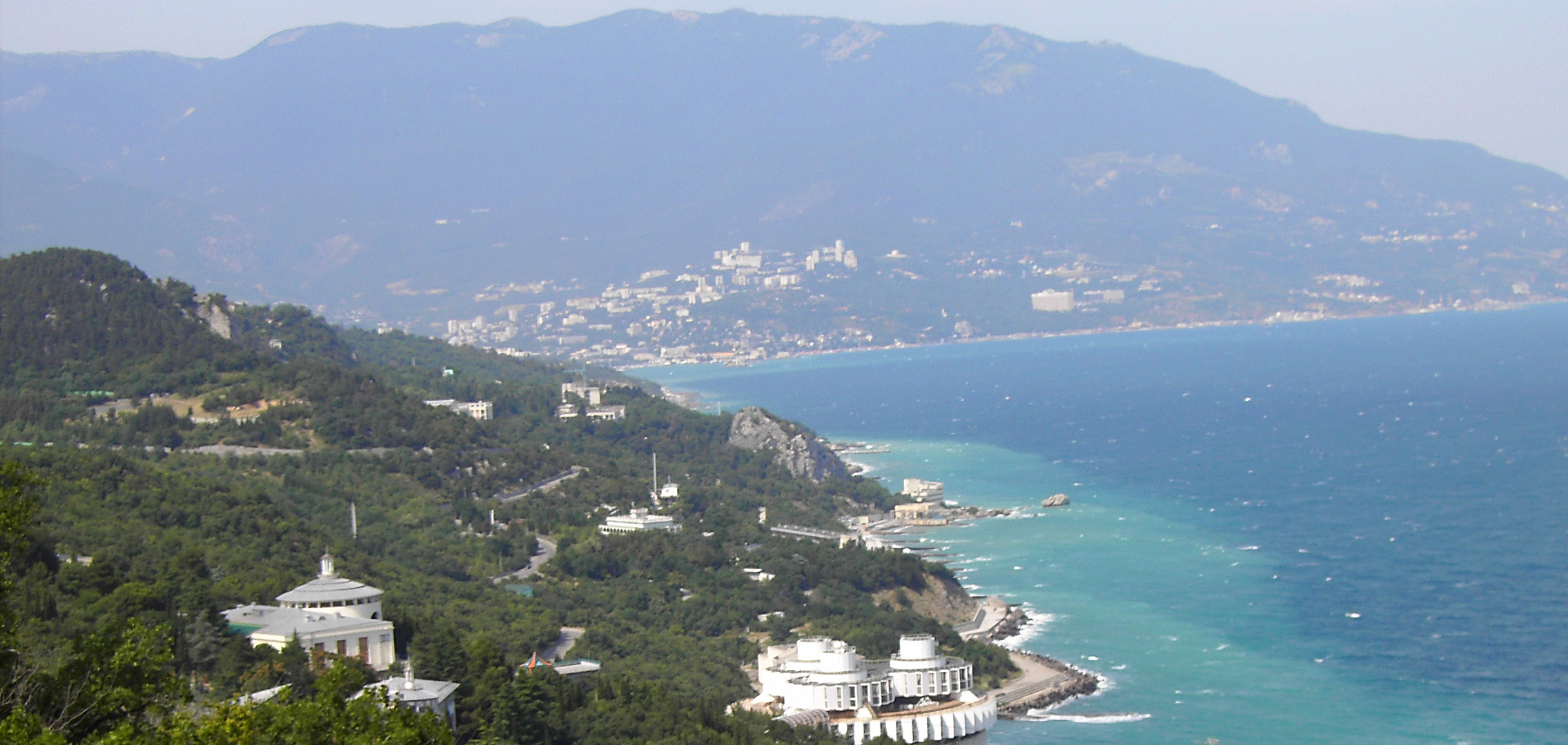
The Crimean Mountains in the background and Yalta as seen from the Tsar's Path.

The terrain that lies south of the sheltering Crimean Mountain range is of an altogether different character. Here, the narrow strip of coast and the slopes of the mountains are covered with greenery. This "riviera" stretches along the southeast coast from capes Fiolent and Aya, in the south, to Feodosia. There are many summer sea-bathing resorts such as Alupka, Yalta, Gurzuf, Alushta, Sudak, and Feodosia. During the years of Soviet rule, the resorts and dachas of this coast were used by leading politicians and served as prime perquisites of the politically loyal. In addition, vineyards and fruit orchards are located in the region. Fishing, mining, and the production of essential oils are also important. Numerous Crimean Tatar villages, mosques, monasteries, and palaces of the Russian imperial family and nobles are found here, as well as picturesque ancient Greek and medieval castles.

The Crimean Mountains and the southern coast are part of the Crimean Submediterranean forest complex ecoregion. The natural vegetation consists of scrublands, woodlands, and forests, with a climate and vegetation similar to the Mediterranean Basin.

=== Climate ===
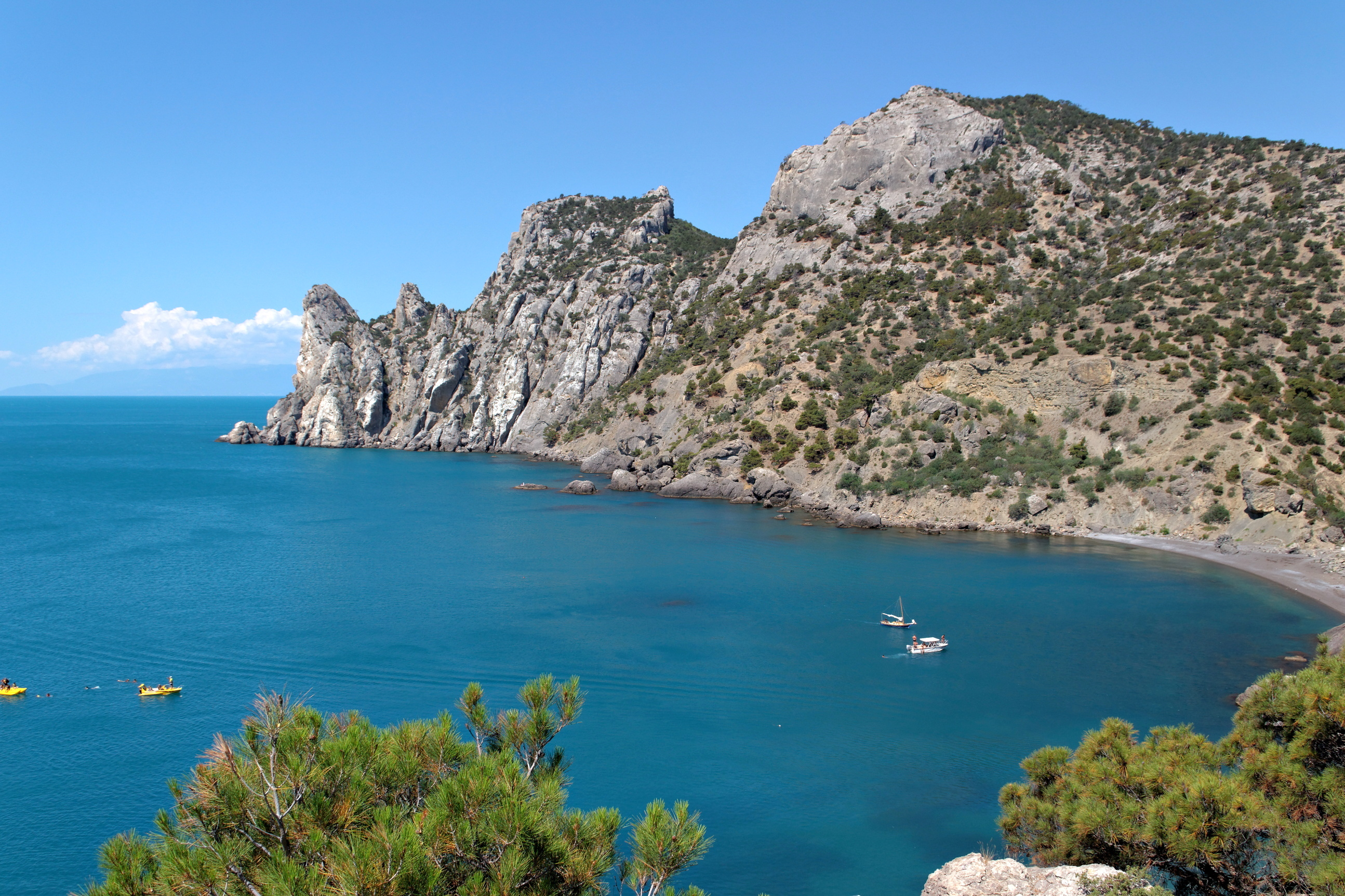
Crimea's Southern Coast has a subtropical climate

Crimea is located between the temperate and subtropical climate belts and is characterised by warm and sunny weather. It is characterised by diversity and the presence of microclimates. The northern parts of Crimea have a moderate continental climate with short but cold winters and moderately hot dry summers. In the central and mountainous areas the climate is transitional between the continental climate to the north and the Mediterranean climate to the south. Winters are mild at lower altitudes (in the foothills) and colder at higher altitudes. Summers are hot at lower altitudes and warm in the mountains. A subtropical, Mediterranean climate dominates the southern coastal regions, is characterised by mild winters and moderately hot, dry summers.

The climate of Crimea is influenced by its geographic location, relief, and influences from the Black Sea. The Southern Coast is shielded from cold air masses coming from the north and, as a result, has milder winters. Maritime influences from the Black Sea are restricted to coastal areas; in the interior of the peninsula the maritime influence is weak and does not play an important role. Because a high-pressure system is located north of Crimea in both summer and winter, winds predominantly come from the north and northeast year-round. In winter these winds bring in cold, dry continental air, while in summer they bring in dry and hot weather. Winds from the northwest bring warm and wet air from the Atlantic Ocean, causing precipitation during spring and summer. As well, winds from the southwest bring very warm and wet air from the subtropical latitudes of the Atlantic Ocean and the Mediterranean sea and cause precipitation during fall and winter.

Mean annual temperatures range from 10 °C (50.0 °F) in the far north (Armiansk) to 13 °C (55.4 °F) in the far south (Yalta). In the mountains, the mean annual temperature is around 5.7 °C (42.3 °F). For every 100 m (330 ft) increase in altitude, temperatures decrease by 0.65 °C (1.17 °F) while precipitation increases. In January mean temperatures range from −3 °C (26.6 °F) in Armiansk to 4.4 °C (39.9 °F) in Myskhor. Cool-season temperatures average around 7 °C (44.6 °F) and it is rare for the weather to drop below freezing except in the mountains, where there is usually snow. In July mean temperatures range from 15.4 °C (59.7 °F) in Ai-Petri to 23.4 °C (74.1 °F) in the central parts of Crimea to 24.4 °C (75.9 °F) in Myskhor. The frost-free period ranges from 160 to 200 days in the steppe and mountain regions to 240–260 days on the south coast.

Precipitation in Crimea varies significantly based on location; it ranges from 310 millimetres (12.2 in) in Chornomorske to 1,220 millimetres (48.0 in) at the highest altitudes in the Crimean mountains. The Crimean mountains greatly influence the amount of precipitation present in the peninsula. However, most of Crimea (88.5%) receives 300 to 500 millimetres (11.8 to 19.7 in) of precipitation per year. The plains usually receive 300 to 400 millimetres (11.8 to 15.7 in) of precipitation per year, increasing to 560 millimetres (22.0 in) in the southern coast at sea level. The western parts of the Crimean mountains receive more than 1,000 millimetres (39.4 in) of precipitation per year. Snowfall is common in the mountains during winter.

Most of the peninsula receives more than 2,000 sunshine hours per year; it reaches up to 2,505 sunshine hours in Qarabiy yayla in the Crimean Mountains. As a result, the climate favours recreation and tourism. Because of its climate and subsidised travel-packages from Russian state-run companies, the southern coast has remained a popular resort for Russian tourists.

=== Strategic value ===
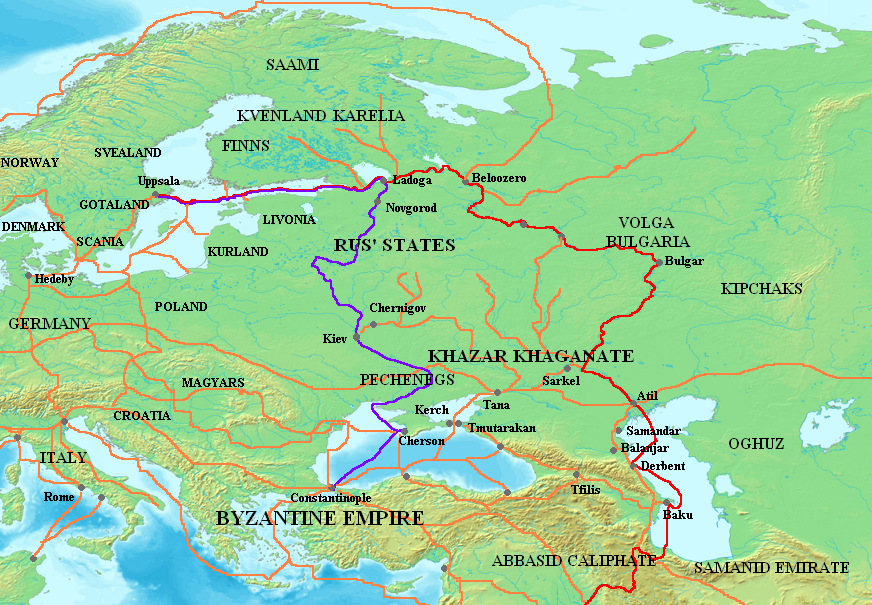
Map of the historical trade route (shown in purple) connecting Uppsala with Constantinople via Cherson. The major centres of Kievan Rus' – Kyiv itself, Novgorod and Ladoga – arose along this route.

The Black Sea ports of Crimea provide quick access to the Eastern Mediterranean, Balkans and Middle East. Historically, possession of the southern coast of Crimea was sought after by most empires of the greater region since antiquity (Roman, Byzantine, Ottoman, Russian, British and French, Nazi German, Soviet).

The nearby Dnieper River is a major waterway and transportation route that crosses the European continent from north to south and ultimately links the Black Sea with the Baltic Sea, of strategic importance since the historical trade route from the Varangians to the Greeks. The Black Sea serves as an economic thoroughfare connecting the Caucasus region and the Caspian Sea to central and Eastern Europe.

According to the International Transport Workers' Federation, as of 2013 there were at least 12 operating merchant seaports in Crimea.

== Economy ==
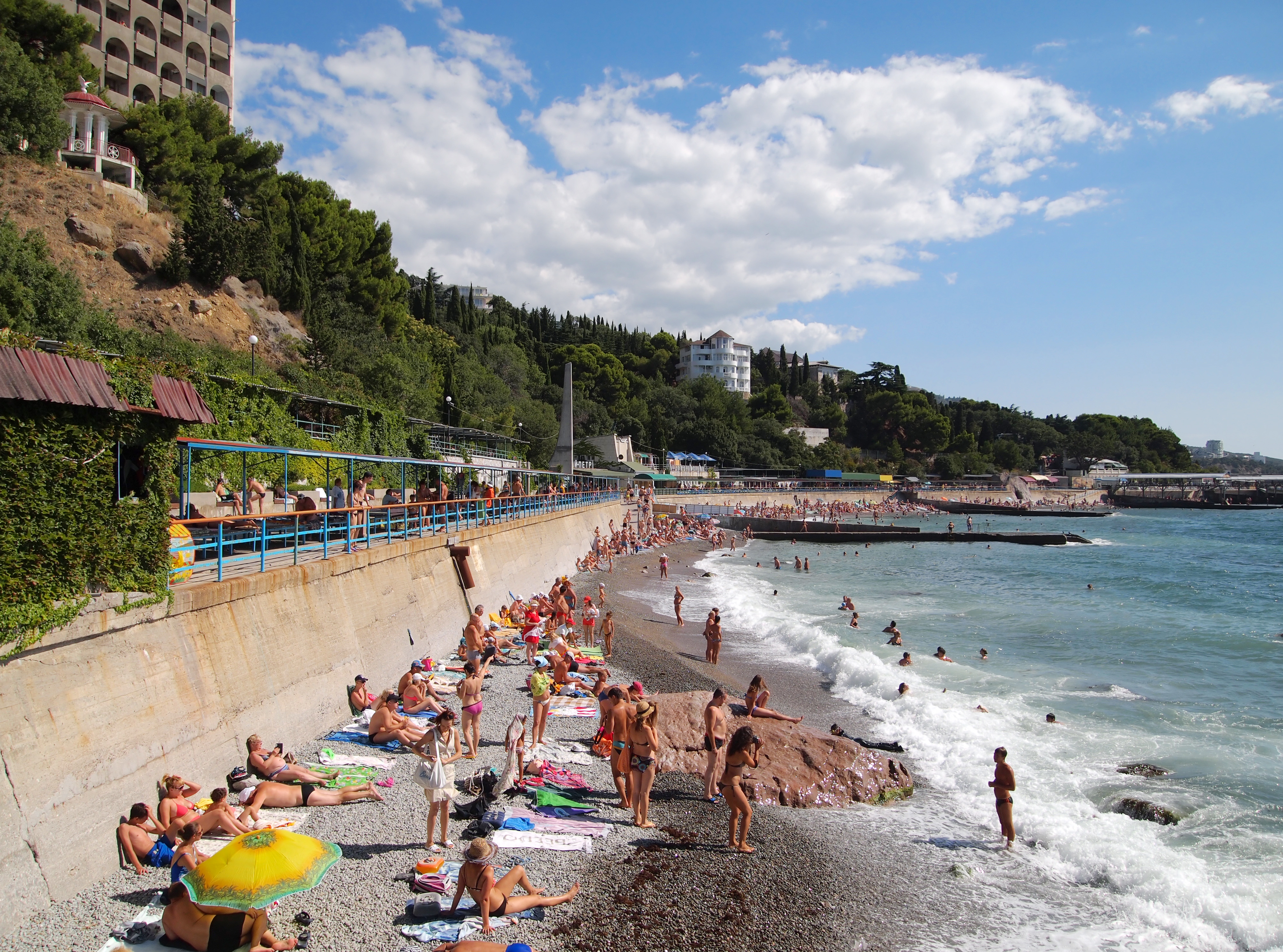
Tourism is an important sector of Crimea's economy

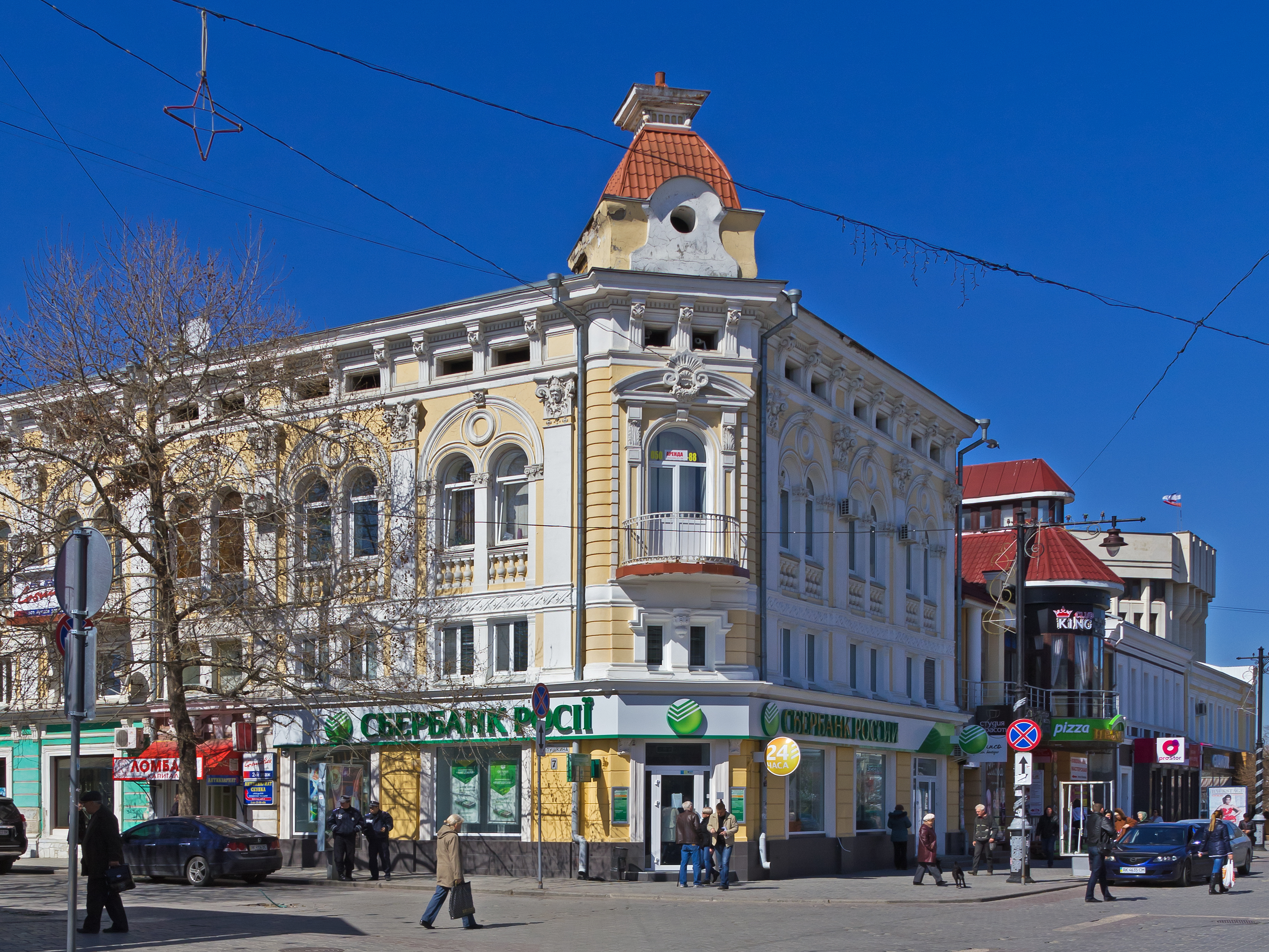
Simferopol's city centre

In 2016 Crimea had Nominal GDP of US$7 billion and US$3,000 per capita.

The main branches of the modern Crimean economy are agriculture and fishing oysters pearls, industry and manufacturing, tourism, and ports. Industrial plants are situated for the most part in the southern coast (Yevpatoria, Sevastopol, Feodosia, Kerch) regions of the republic, few northern (Armiansk, Krasnoperekopsk, Dzhankoi), aside from the central area, mainly Simferopol okrug and eastern region in Nizhnegorsk (few plants, same for Dzhankoj) city. Important industrial cities include Dzhankoi, housing a major railway connection, Krasnoperekopsk and Armiansk, among others.

After the Russian annexation of Crimea in early 2014 and subsequent sanctions targeting Crimea, the tourist industry suffered major losses for two years. The flow of holidaymakers dropped 35 percent in the first half of 2014 over the same period of 2013. The number of tourist arrivals reached a record in 2012 at 6.1 million. According to the Russian administration of Crimea, they dropped to 3.8 million in 2014, and rebounded to 5.6 million by 2016.

The most important industries in Crimea include food production, chemical fields, mechanical engineering, and metalworking, and fuel production industries. Sixty percent of the industry market belongs to food production. There are a total of 291 large industrial enterprises and 1002 small business enterprises.

In 2014, the republic's annual GDP was $4.3 billion (500 times smaller than the size of Russia's economy). The average salary was $290 per month. The budget deficit was $1.5 billion.

=== Agriculture ===
Agriculture in the region includes cereals, vegetable-growing, gardening, and wine-making, particularly in the Yalta and Massandra regions. Livestock production includes cattle breeding, poultry keeping, and sheep breeding. Other products produced on the Crimean Peninsula include salt, porphyry, limestone, and ironstone (found around Kerch) since ancient times.

The vine mealybug (Planococcus ficus) was first discovered here in 1868. First discovered on grape, it has also been found as a pest of some other crops and has since spread worldwide. Sunn pests—especially Eurygaster integriceps and E. maura—are significant grain pests. Scelioninae and Tachinidae are important parasitoids of sunn pests. Bark beetles are pests of tree crops, and are themselves hosts for Elattoma mites and various entomopathogenic fungi transmitted by those Elattomae.

=== Energy ===
Crimea possesses several natural gas fields both onshore and offshore, which were starting to be drilled by western oil and gas companies before annexation. The inland fields are located in Chornomorske and Dzhankoi, while offshore fields are located in the western coast in the Black Sea and in the northeastern coast in the Azov Sea:

Name	Type	Location	Reserves
Dzhankoi gas field	onshore	Dzhankoi	
Holitsynske gas field	offshore	Black Sea	
Karlavske gas field	onshore	Chornomorske	
Krym gas field	offshore	Black Sea	
Odeske gas field	offshore	Black Sea	21 billion m^{3}
Schmidta gas field	offshore	Black Sea	
Shtormvaia gas field	offshore	Black Sea	
Strilkove gas field	offshore	Sea of Azov	

The republic also possesses two oil fields: one onshore, the Serebryankse oil field in Rozdolne, and one offshore, the Subbotina oil field in the Black Sea.

Electricity

Crimea has 540 MW of its own electricity generation capacity, including the 100 MW Simferopol Thermal Power Plant, the 22 MW Sevastopol Thermal Power Plant and the 19 MW Kamish-Burunskaya Thermal Power Plant. This local electricity generation has proven insufficient for local consumption, and since annexation by Russia, Crimea has been reliant on an underwater power cable to mainland Russia.

Power generation is set to be increased by two combined-cycle gas steam turbo thermal plants PGU, each {or should this be both combined?} providing 470 MW (116 167 MW GT, 235 MW block), built by TPE (among others) with turbines provided by Power Machines; NPO Saturn with Perm PMZ; either modified GTD-110M/GTE-160/GTE-180 units or UTZ KTZ, or a V94.2 supplied by MAPNA, modified in Russia by PGU Thermal.

Solar photovoltaic SES plants are plentiful on the peninsula, including a small facility north of Sevastopol. There also is the Saky gas thermal plant near the Jodobrom chemical plant, featuring SaKhZ(SaChP) boosted production with Perm GTE GTU25P (PS90GP25 25 MW aeroderivative GP) PGU turbogenerators. Older plants in operation include the Sevastopol TEC (close to Inkerman) which uses AEG and Ganz Elektro turbines and turbogenerators generating about 25 MW each, Simferopol TEC, Yevpatoria, Kamysh Burun TEC (Kerch south – Zaliv) and a few others.

=== Transport ===
Crimean Bridge

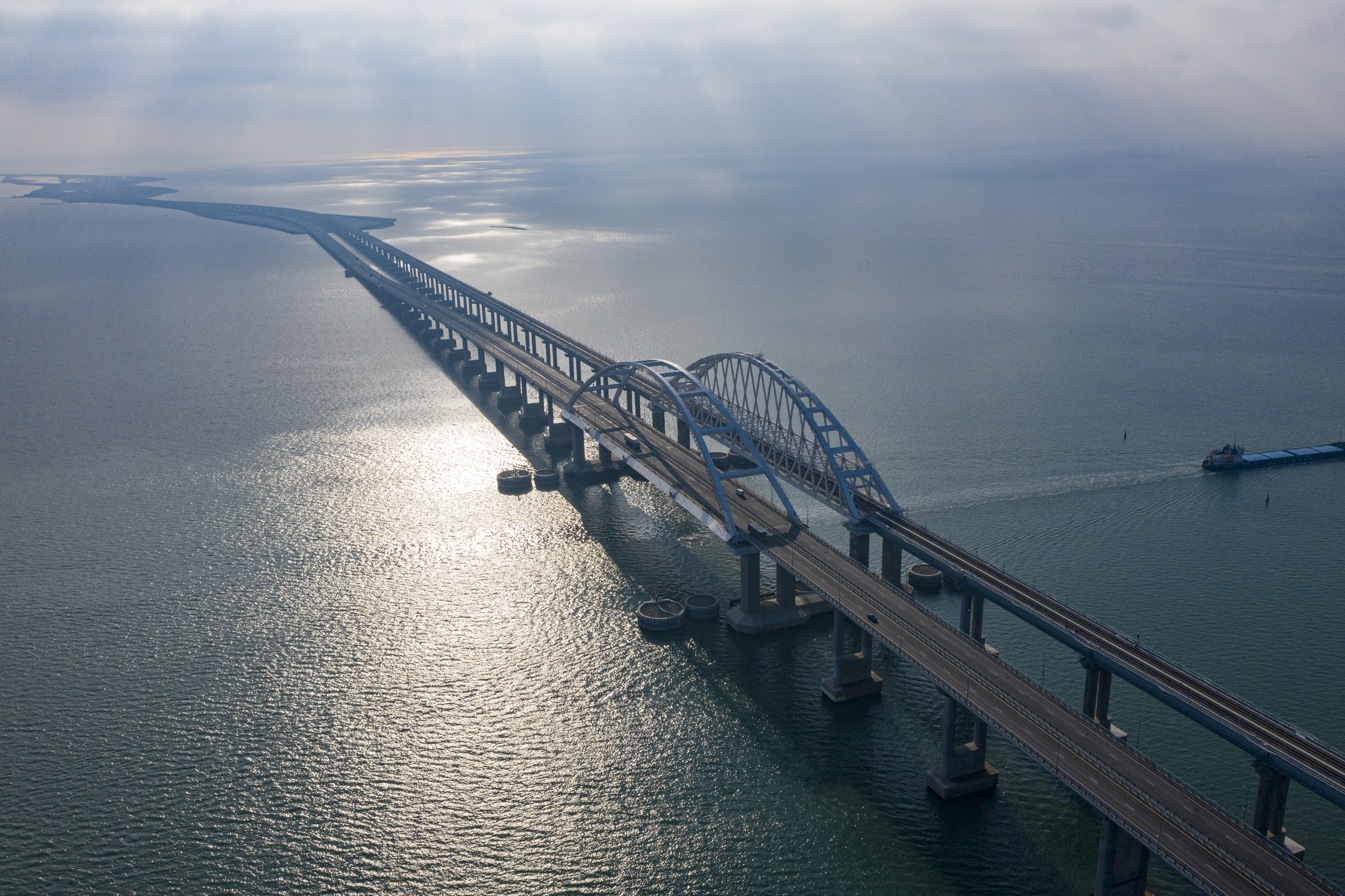
Crimean Bridge

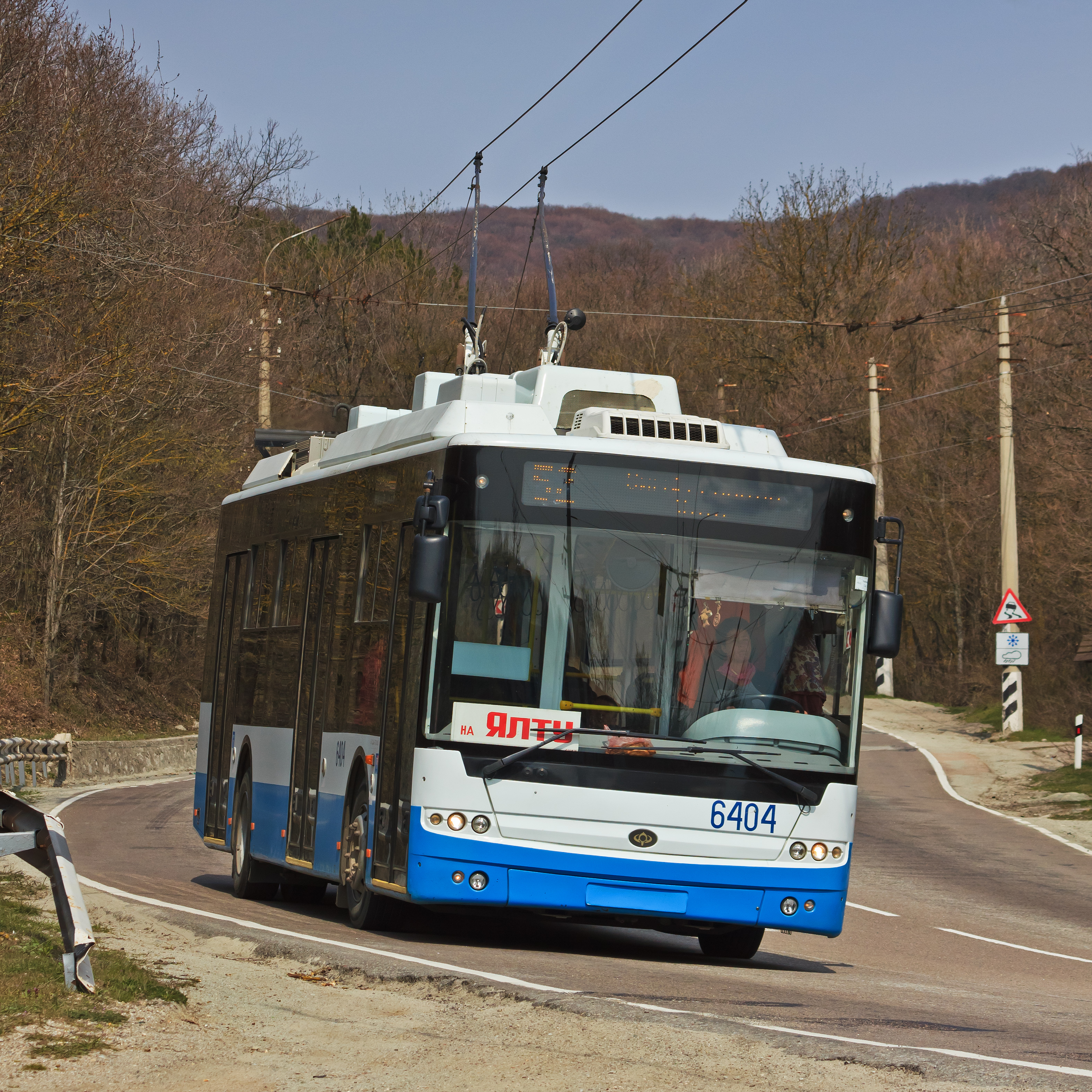
Trolleybus near Alushta

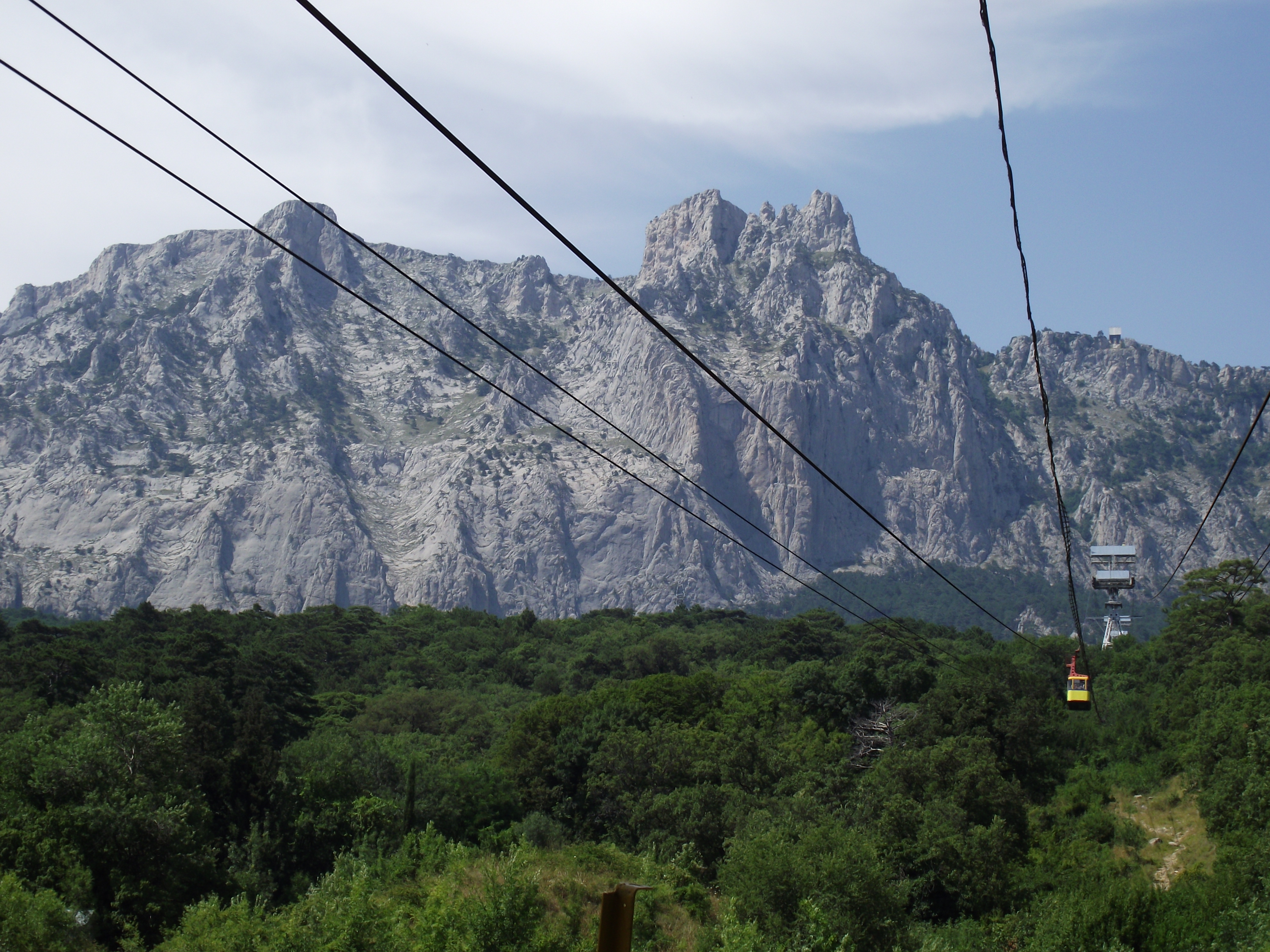
Cableway in Yalta

In May 2015, work began on a multibillion-dollar road-rail link (a pair of parallel bridges) across the Kerch Strait. The road bridge opened in May 2018, and the rail bridge in December 2019. With a length of 19 km, it is the longest bridge in Europe, surpassing Vasco da Gama Bridge in Lisbon. The Crimean Bridge was damaged by an attack on 8 October 2022, and another on 17 July 2023.

Public transportation

Almost every settlement in Crimea is connected with another settlement by bus lines. Crimea contains the longest (96 km or 59 mi) trolleybus route in the world, founded in 1959, stretching from Simferopol to Yalta. The trolleybus line starts near Simferopol's Railway Station (in Soviet times it started near Simferopol International Airport) through the mountains to Alushta and on to Yalta. The length of line is about 90 km and passengers are assigned a seat. Simferopol, Yalta and Alushta also have an urban and suburban trolleybus network. Trolleybuses also operate in Sevastopol and Kerch.

A tram system operates in the city of Yevpatoria. In the nearby townlet village of Molochnoye, a 1.6 km-long tram line provides the only connection between the sea shore and a holiday resort, but its operation is halted since 2015.

Railway traffic

There are two railroad lines running through Crimea: the non-electrified Armiansk–Kerch (with a link to Feodosia), and the electrified Melitopol–Simferopol–Sevastopol (with a link to Yevpatoria), connecting Crimea to the Ukrainian mainland.

Until 2014 the network was part of the Cisdneper Directorate of the Ukrainian Railways. Long-distance trains provided connection to all major Ukrainian cities, to many towns of Russia, Belarus and, until the end of the 2000s, even to Vilnius, Riga, Warsaw and Berlin.

Since 2014 the railways are operated by the Crimea Railway. Local trains belong to the Yuzhnaya Prigorodnaya Passazhirskaya Kompaniya (Southern Suburban Passenger Company), serving the entire network of the peninsula and via the Crimean Bridge three trains daily to Anapa. Long-distance trains under the name Tavriya – operated by the company Grand Servis Ekspress – connect Sevastopol and Simferopol daily with Moscow and Saint Petersburg; in the summer season Yevpatoria and Feodosia are also directly connected by them. Several times a week Simferopol is also linked with Volgograd, Sochi, Yekaterinburg, Omsk and even Murmansk by train.

Further development plans consist of a bypass line between Simferopol and Kerch, and a complete electrification of the network with changing the voltage of the already electrified lines from 3 kV DC to 25 kV 50 Hz AC.

Aviation

- Simferopol International Airport is an air transport hub of Crimea.

Highways

- А-291 – Tavrida highway (route Yevpatoria-) Sevastopol – Simferopol (SW to W N to East ring) – Bilohirsk
  – north Feodosia – Kerch south (strait bridge)
- E105/M18 – Syvash (bridge, starts), Dzhankoi, North Crimean Canal (bridge), Simferopol, Alushta, Yalta (ends)
- E97/M17 – Perekop (starts), Armiansk, Dzhankoi, Feodosia, Kerch (ferry, ends)
- A290 – Novorossiysk to Kerch via the Crimean Bridge (formerly known as Highway M25)
- H05 – Krasnoperekopsk, Simferopol (access to the Simferopol International Airport)
- H06 – Simferopol, Bakhchysarai, Sevastopol
- H19 – Yalta, Sevastopol
- P16
- P23 – Simferopol, Feodosia
- P25 – Simferopol, Yevpatoria
- P27 – Sevastopol, Inkerman (completely within the city of Sevastopol)
- P29 – Alushta, Sudak, Feodosia
- P34 – Alushta, Yalta
- P35 – Hrushivka, Sudak
- P58 – Sevastopol, Port "Komysheva Bukhta" (completely within the city of Sevastopol)
- P59 (completely within the city of Sevastopol)

Sea transport

The cities of Yalta, Feodosia, Kerch, Sevastopol, Chornomorske and Yevpatoria are connected to one another by sea routes.

=== Tourism ===
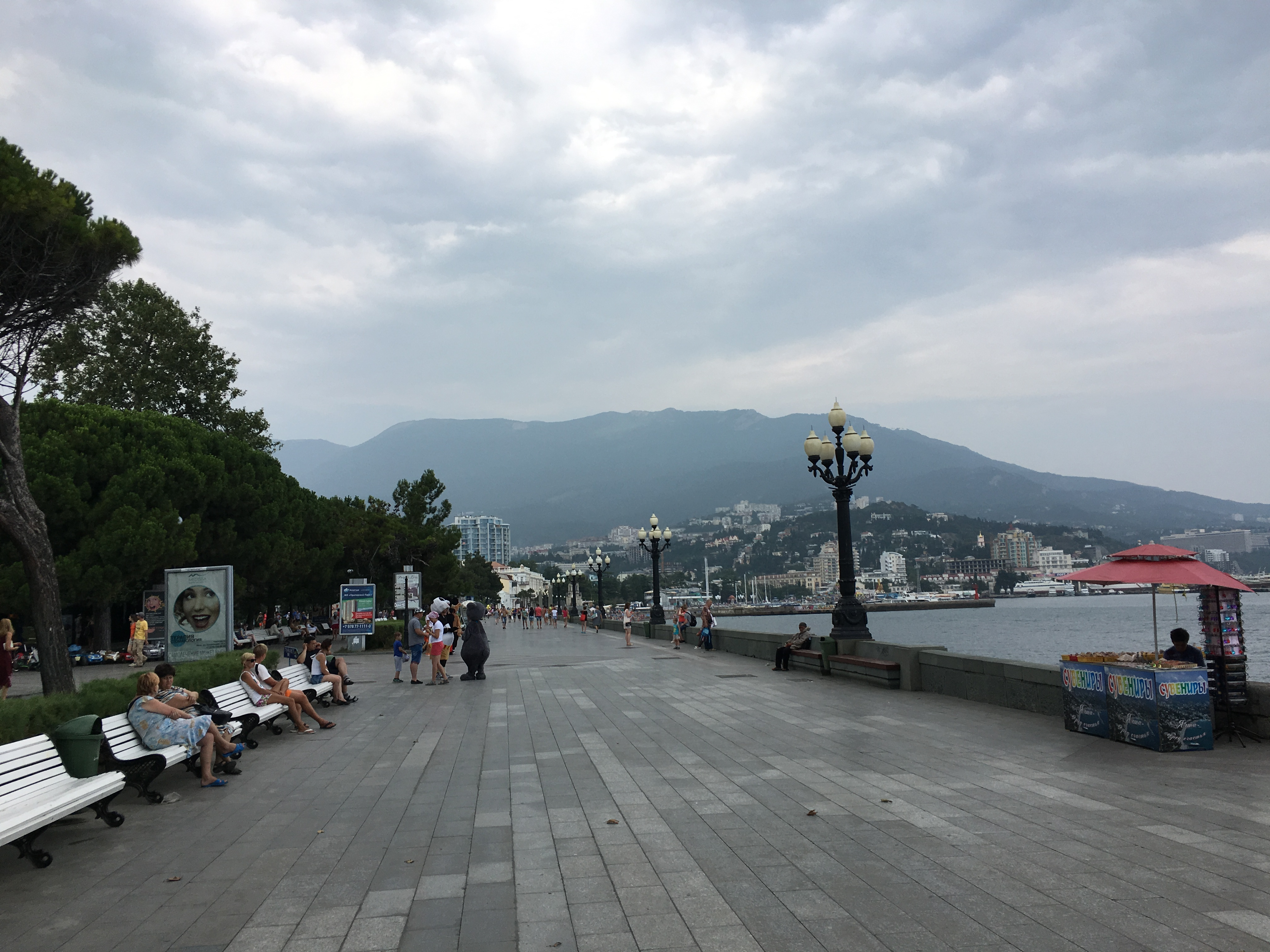
Boardwalk in Yalta.

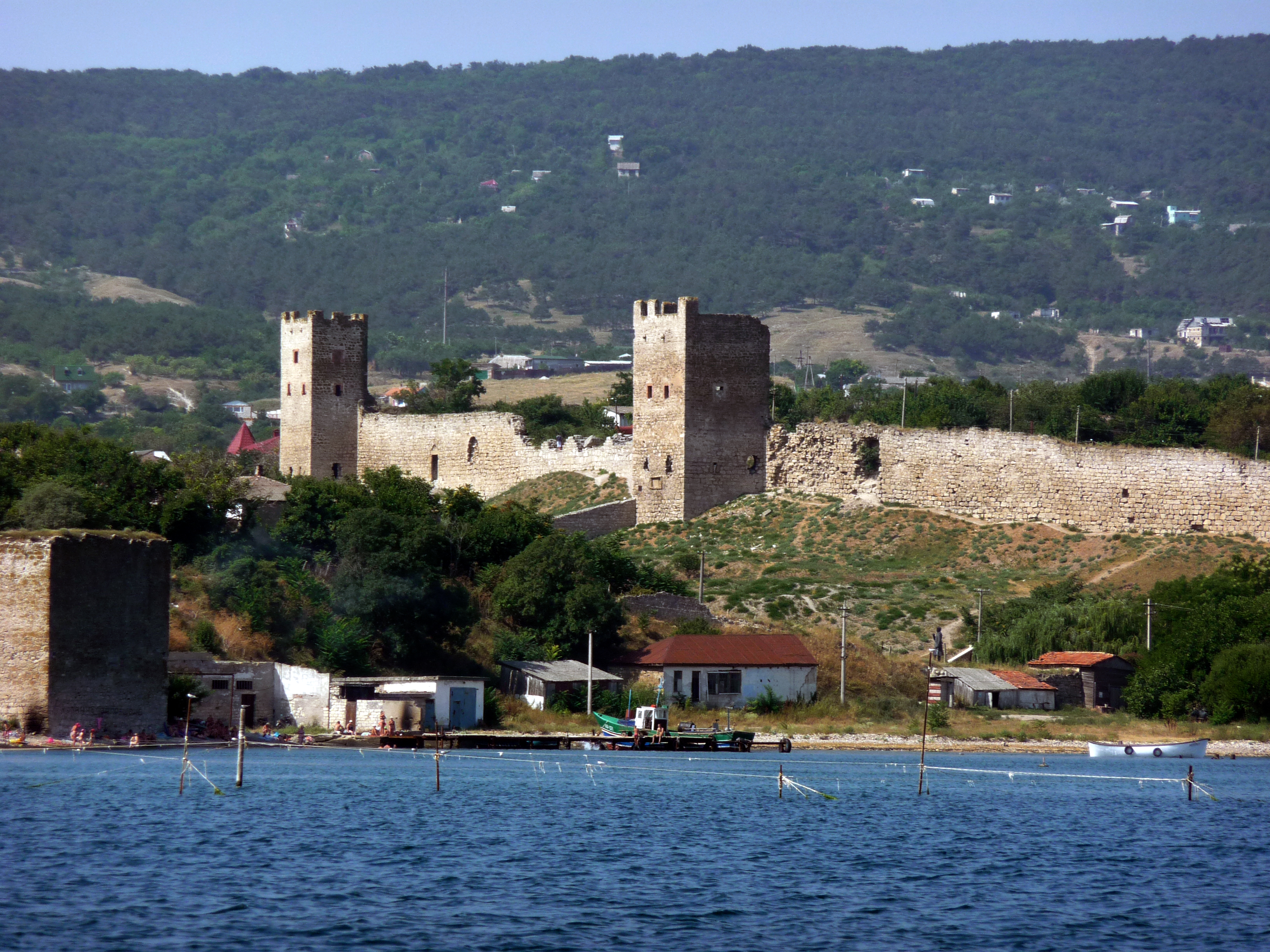
Genoese fortress of Caffa.

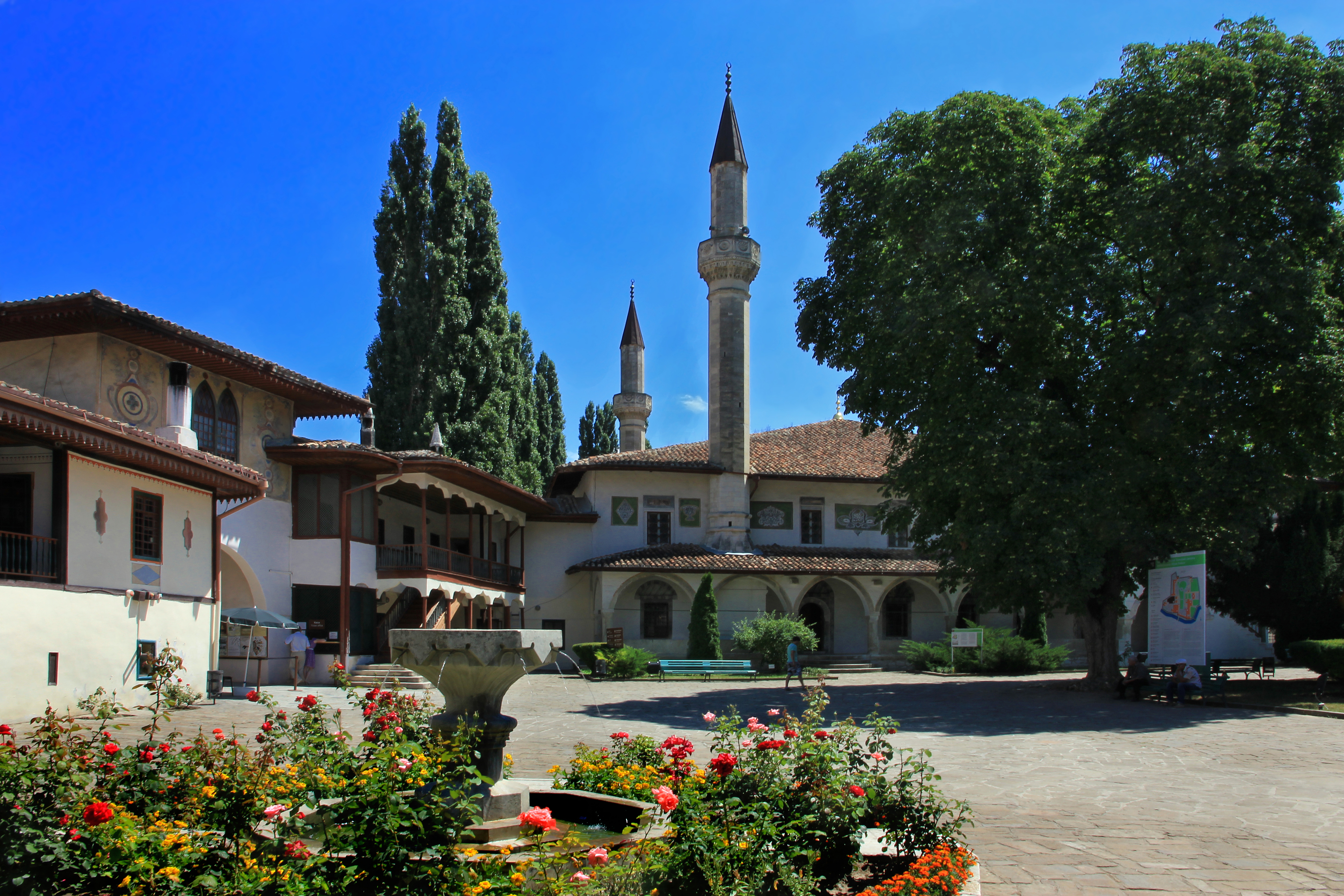
Mosque and yard in the Khan Palace in Bakhchisaray

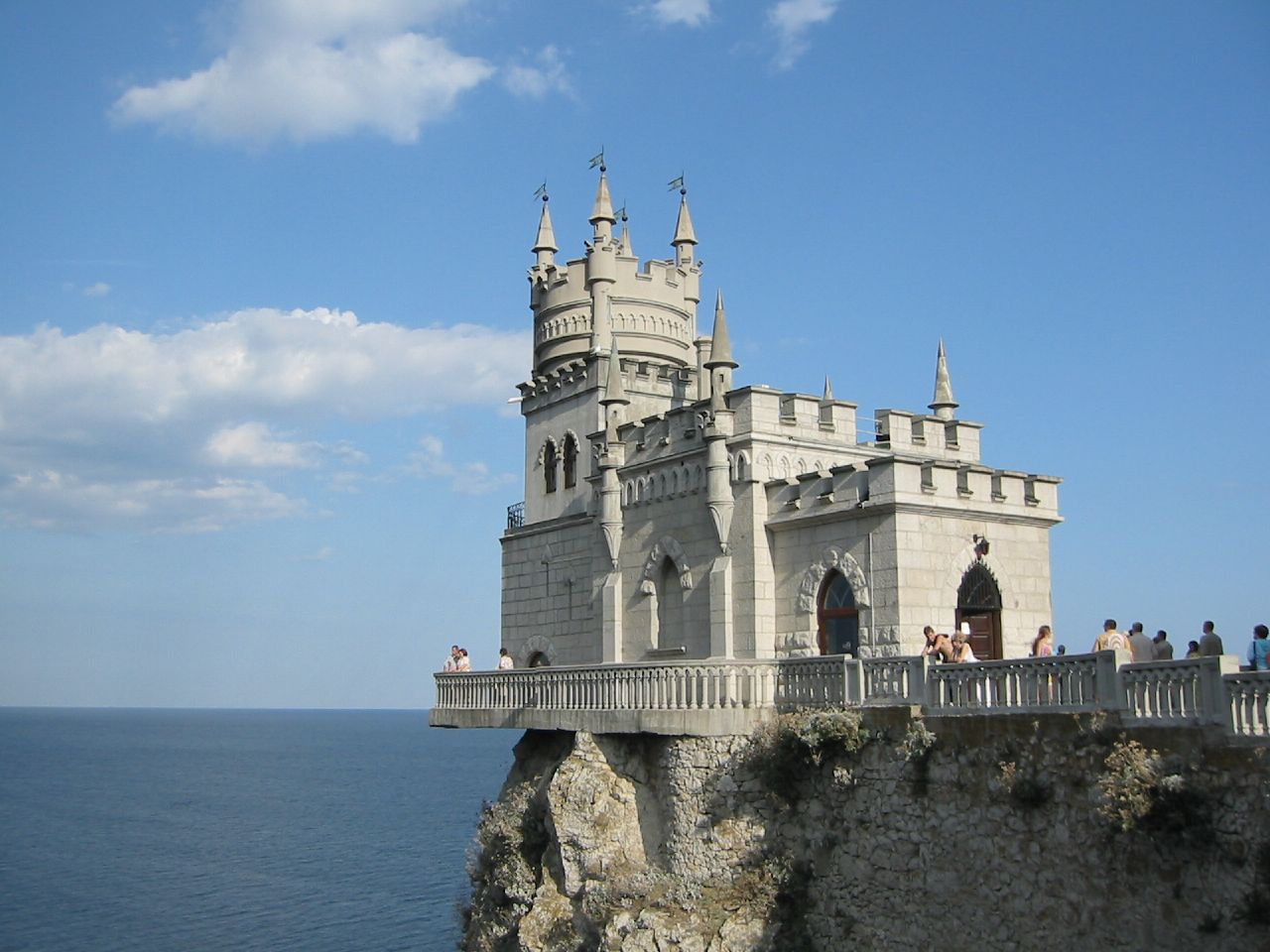
Swallow's Nest, built in 1912 for businessman Baron Pavel von Steingel

The development of Crimea as a holiday destination began in the second half of the 19th century. The development of the transport networks brought masses of tourists from central parts of the Russian Empire. At the beginning of the 20th century, a major development of palaces, villas, and dachas began—most of which remain. These are some of the main attractions of Crimea as a tourist destination. There are many Crimean legends about famous touristic places, which attract the attention of tourists.

A new phase of tourist development began when the Soviet government started promoting the healing quality of the local air, lakes and therapeutic muds. It became a "health" destination for Soviet workers, and hundreds of thousands of Soviet tourists visited Crimea.

Artek is a former Young Pioneer camp on the Black Sea in the town of Hurzuf, near Ayu-Dag, established in 1925. By 1969 it had an area of 3.2 km^{2} (1.2 sq mi), and consisted of 150 buildings. Unlike most of the young pioneer camps, Artek was an all-year camp, due to the warm climate. Artek was considered to be a privilege for Soviet children during its existence, as well as for children from other communist countries. During its heyday, 27,000 children a year vacationed at Artek. Between 1925 and 1969 the camp hosted 300,000 children. After the breaking up of the Young Pioneers in 1991 its prestige declined, though it remained a popular vacation destination.

In the 1990s, Crimea became more of a get-away destination than a "health-improvement" destination. The most visited areas are the south shore of Crimea with cities of Yalta and Alushta, the western shore – Yevpatoria and Saky, and the south-eastern shore – Feodosia and Sudak. According to National Geographic, Crimea was among the top 20 travel destinations in 2013.

Places of interest include

- Koktebel
- Livadia Palace
- Mount Mithridat
- Scythian Treasure
- Swallow's Nest
- Tauric Chersonesos
- Vorontsov Palace
- Bakhchisaray Palace
- Massandra Palace and Winery
- Novyi Svit
- Nikitsky Botanical Garden
- Aivazovsky National Art Gallery in Feodosia
- Naval museum complex Balaklava
- The Valley of Ghosts

=== Sanctions ===
Following Russia's largely unrecognised annexation of Crimea, the European Union, the United States, Canada, Australia, Japan, and several other countries (including Ukraine) imposed economic sanctions against Russia, including some specifically targeting Crimea. Many of these sanctions were directed at individuals—both Russian and Crimean. In general they prohibit the sale, supply, transfer, or export of goods and technology in several sectors, including services directly related to tourism and infrastructure. They list seven ports where cruise ships cannot dock. Sanctions against individuals include travel bans and asset freezes. Visa and MasterCard temporarily stopped service in Crimea in December 2014. The Russian national payment card system allows Visa and MasterCard cards issued by Russian banks to work in Crimea. The Mir payment system operated by the Central Bank of Russia operates in Crimea as well as MasterCard and Visa. However, there are no major international banks in Crimea.

== Politics ==
Crimea was occupied and annexed by Russia in 2014 though Ukraine has not relinquished title and it remains internationally recognised as Ukrainian territory. Ukrainian president Volodymyr Zelenskyy drew attention to this in August 2022 when he stated that it was "necessary to liberate Crimea" from Russian occupation and to re-establish "world law and order".

Within the context of the largely unrecognised annexation, the politics of Crimea today is, de facto, that of two Federal subjects of Russia: the Republic of Crimea and the federal city of Sevastopol. The 2024 elections to the State Council of Crimea, the legislature of the Republic of Crimea, resulted in United Russia winning 68 of the 75 seats. The State Council then re-elected Sergey Aksyonov to the position of Head of the Republic of Crimea, a position he had held since 2014.

Crimea has four Deputies in the Russian State Duma; three representing constituencies in the Republic of Crimea (Simferopol, Kerch and Yevpatoria) and one representing Sevastopol.

== Demographics ==
Historical population
Year	Pop.	±%
1897	546,592	—
1926	713,823	+30.6%
1939	1,126,429	+57.8%
1959	1,201,517	+6.7%
1970	1,813,502	+50.9%
1979	2,182,927	+20.4%
1989	2,430,495	+11.3%
2001	2,401,209	−1.2%
2014	2,284,400	−4.9%
2021	2,482,450	+8.7%
Source: Census data

As of 2014, the total population of the Republic of Crimea and Sevastopol was 2,248,400 people (Republic of Crimea: 1,889,485; Sevastopol: 395,000). This was down from the 2001 Ukrainian Census figure of 2,376,000 (Autonomous Republic of Crimea: 2,033,700; Sevastopol: 342,451).

According to the 2014 Russian census, 84% of Crimean inhabitants named Russian as their native language; 7.9% Crimean Tatar; 3.7% Tatar; and 3.3% Ukrainian. It was the first official census in Crimea since a Ukrainian-held census in 2001.

According to the 2001 census, 77% of Crimean inhabitants named Russian as their native language; 11.4% Crimean Tatar; and 10.1% Ukrainian. In 2013, however, the Crimean Tatar language was estimated to be on the brink of extinction, being taught in Crimea in only about 15 schools at that time. Turkey provided the greatest support to Tatars in Ukraine, which had been unable to resolve the problem of education in their mother tongue in Crimea, by modernising the schools.

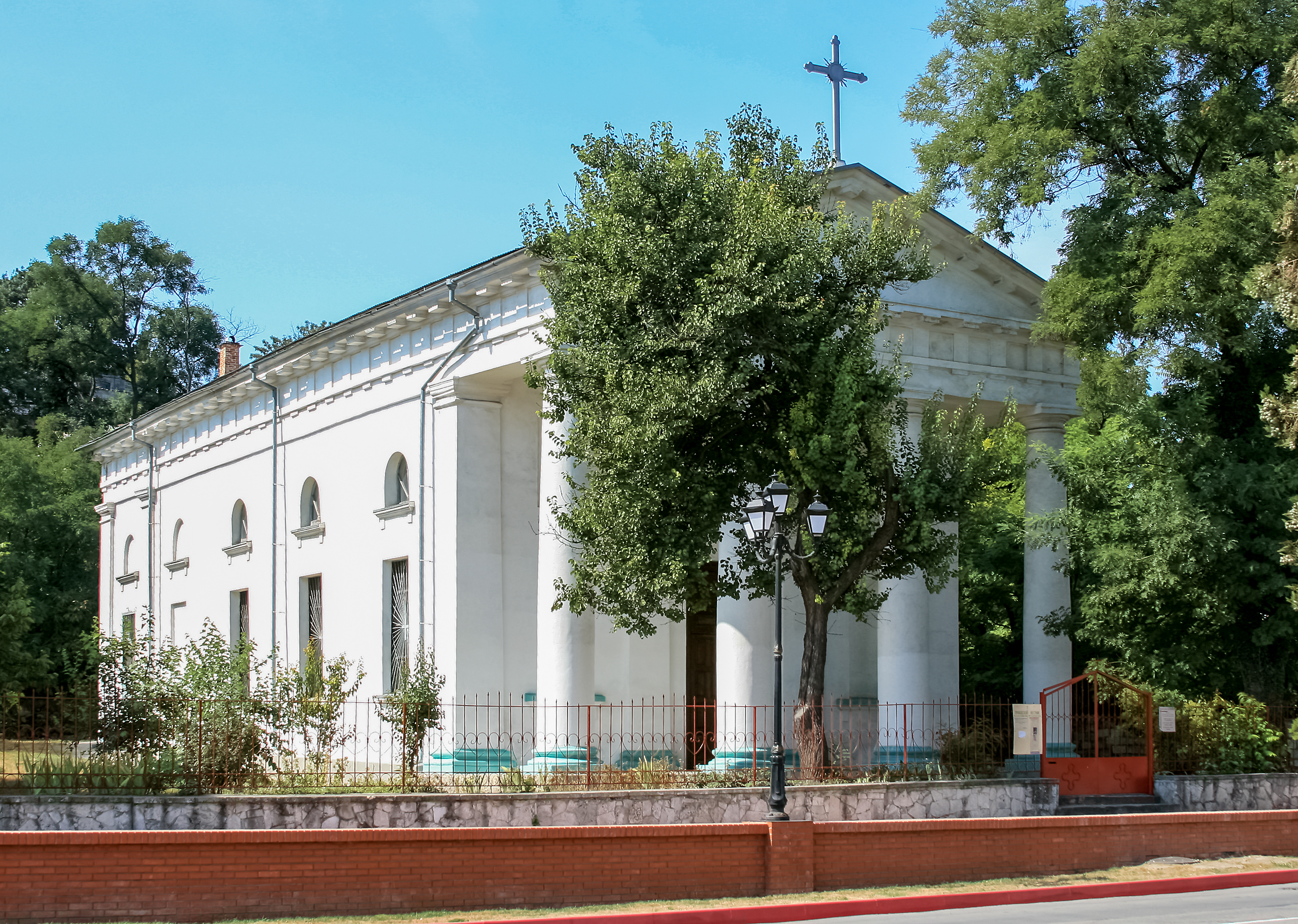
Catholic Church of Santa Maria Assunta in Kerch, reference for the Italians of Crimea

At the beginning of the 19th century, Italian emigration to the Crimea came from various Italian regions (Liguria, Campania, Apulia), with immigrants settling mainly in the coastal cities of the Black Sea and the Sea of Azov, as well as in Odesa, Mykolaiv, Sevastopol, Mariupol, Berdiansk and Taganrog. With the October Revolution of 1917, with which the Russian Empire became the Soviet Union, a bitter period began for minorities in Russia. Italians of Crimea therefore faced much repression. Between 1936 and 1938, during Joseph Stalin's Great Purge, many Italians were accused of espionage and were arrested, tortured, deported or executed. The few survivors were allowed to return to Kerch in the 1950s and 1960s during Nikita Khrushchev's administration. The descendants of the surviving Italians of Crimea currently account for c. 300 people, mainly residing in Kerch. The population number excluding these uyezds is given in the table below.

Date	1785	1795	1816	1835	1850	1864	1897		1926		1939		1959		1970		1979		1989		2001		2014	
Carried out by	Russian Empire								Soviet Union												Ukraine		Russia	
Ethnic group	%	%	%	%	%	%	Number	%	Number	%	Number	%	Number	%	Number	%	Number	%	Number	%	Number	%	Number	%
Russians	2.2%	4.3%	4.8%	4.4%	6.6%	28.5%	180,963	33.11%	301,398	42.2%	558,481	49.6%	858,273	71.4%	1,220,484	67.3%	1,460,980	66.9%	1,629,542	67.0%	1,450,400	60.4%	1,492,078	67.9%
Ukrainians		1.3%	3.6%	3.1%	7%		64,703	11.84%	77,405	10.6%	154,123	13.7%	267,659	22.3%	480,733	26.5%	547,336	25.1%	625,919	25.8%	576,600	24.0%	344,515	15.7%
Crimean Tatars	84.1%	87.6%	85.9%	83.5%	77.8%	50.3%	194,294	35.55%	179,094	25.1%	218,879	19.4%					5,422	0.2%	38,365	1.6%	245,200	10.2%	232,340	10.6%
Belarusians							2,058	0.38%	3,842	0.5%	6,726	0.6%	21,672	1.8%	39,793	2.2%	45,000 (e)	2.1%	50,045	2.1%	35,000	1.5%	21,694	1.0%
Armenians		.6%	1.3%	1.5%	1%	6.5%	8,317	1.52%	10,713	1.5%	12,923	1.1%			3,091	0.2%			2,794	0.1%	10,000	0.4%	11,030	0.5%
Jews		2.3%	2.3%	2%	2.2%	7%	24,168	4.42%	45,926	6.4%	65,452	5.8%	26,374	2.2%	25,614	1.4%			17,371	0.7%	5,500	0.2%	3,374	0.1%
Others	13.7%	3.9%	2.1%	5.5%	5.4%	7.7%	72,089	13.19%					c.27,500	2.3%									92,533	4.2%
Total population stating nationality							546,592		713,823		1,126,429				1,813,502		2,184,000		2,430,495		2,401,200		2,197,564	
Nationality not stated																					12,000		87,205	
Total population													1,201,517						2,458,600		2,413,200		2,284,769	

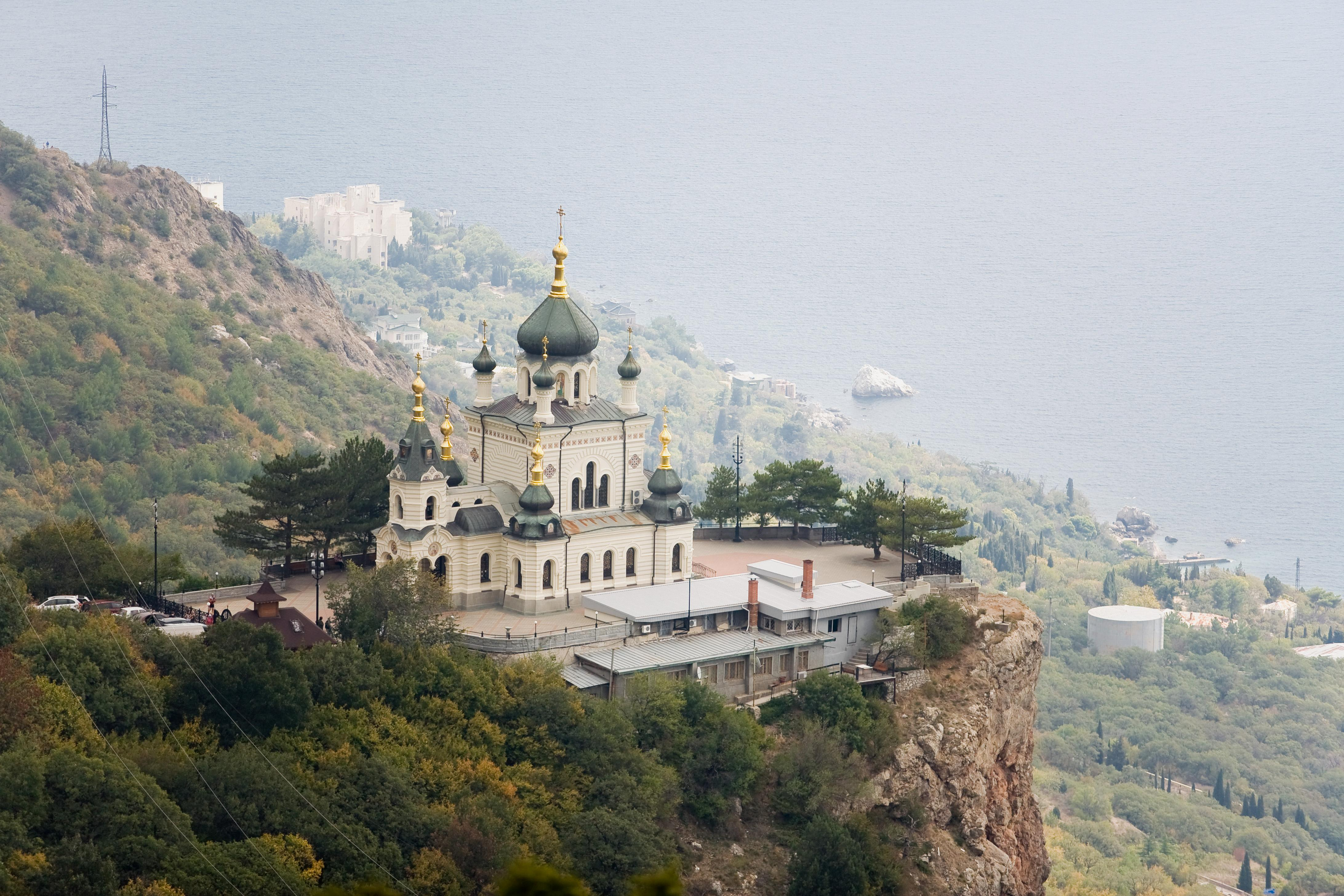
The Foros Church near Yalta

Crimean Tatars, a predominantly Muslim ethnic minority who in 2001 made up 12.1% of the population, formed in Crimea in the early modern era, after the Crimean Khanate had come into existence. The Crimean Tatars were forcibly expelled to Central Asia by Joseph Stalin's government as a form of collective punishment, on the grounds that some had joined the invading Waffen-SS, forming Tatar Legions, during World War II. After the fall of the Soviet Union, Crimean Tatars began to return to the region. According to the 2001 Ukrainian population census, 60% of the population of Crimea are ethnic Russians and 24% are ethnic Ukrainians.

Jews in Crimea were historically Krymchaks and Karaites (the latter a small group centred at Yevpatoria). The 1879 census for the Taurida Governorate reported a Jewish population of 4.20%, not including a Karaite population of 0.43%. The Krymchaks (but not the Karaites) were targeted for annihilation during Nazi occupation. The Nazis murdered around 40,000 Crimean Jews.

The number of Crimea Germans was 60,000 in 1939. During WWII, they were forcibly deported on the orders of Stalin, as they were regarded as a potential "fifth column". This was part of the 800,000 Germans in Russia who were relocated within the Soviet Union during Stalinist times. The 2001 Ukrainian census reports just 2,500 ethnic Germans (0.1% of population) in Crimea.

Besides the Crimean Germans, Stalin in 1944 also deported 70,000 Greeks, 14,000 Crimean Bulgarians and 3,000 Italians of Crimea.

Life expectancy at birth

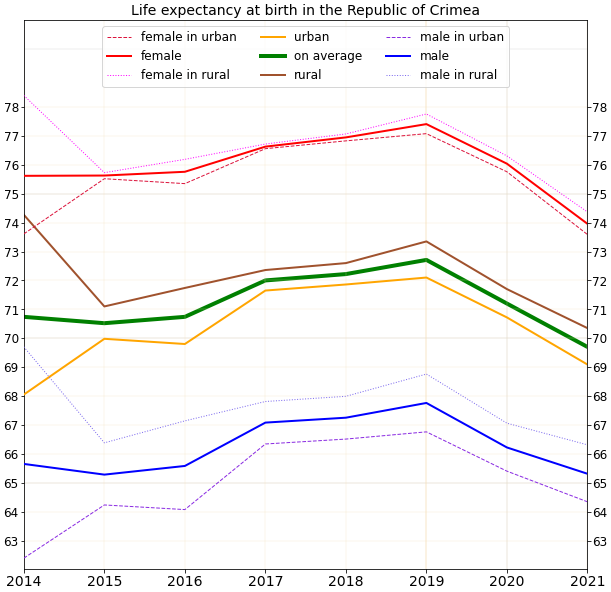
Life expectancy in the Republic of Crimea

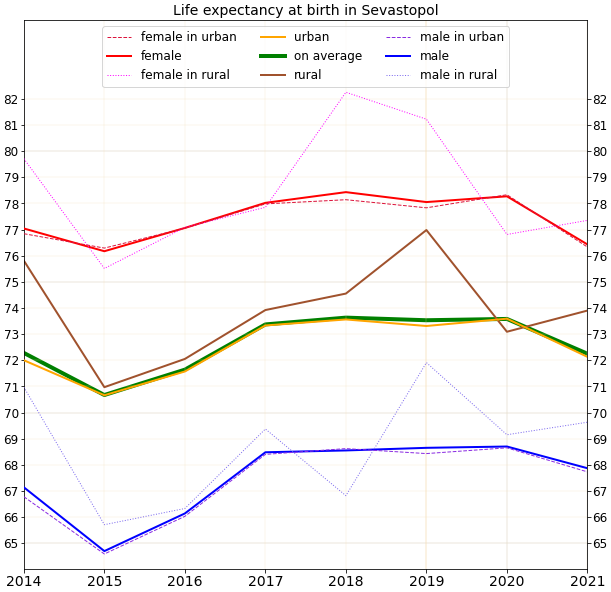
Life expectancy in Sevastopol

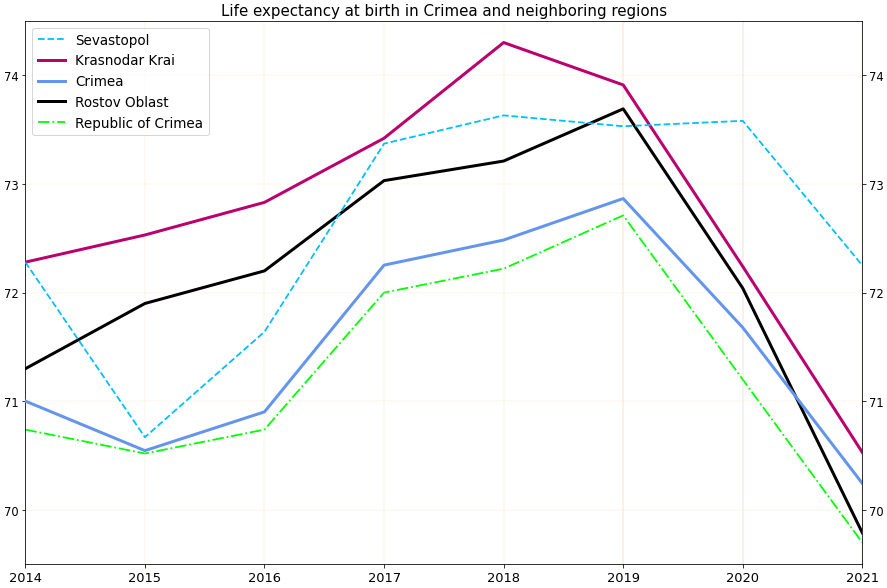
Life expectancy in Crimea and neighbouring regions

Religion

Religion in Crimea (2013)
1. Orthodox (58.0%)
2. Muslim (15.0%)
3. Belief without religion (10.0%)
4. Atheist (2.00%)
5. Other religion (2.00%)
6. Not stated (13.0%)

In 2013, Orthodox Christians made up 58% of the Crimean population, followed by Muslims (15%) and believers in God without religion (10%).

Following the 2014 Russian annexation of Crimea, 38 out of the 46 Ukrainian Orthodox Church – Kyiv Patriarchate parishes in Crimea ceased to exist; in three cases, churches were seized by the Russian authorities. Notwithstanding the annexation, the Ukrainian Orthodox Church (Moscow Patriarchate) kept control of its eparchies in Crimea.

== Culture ==
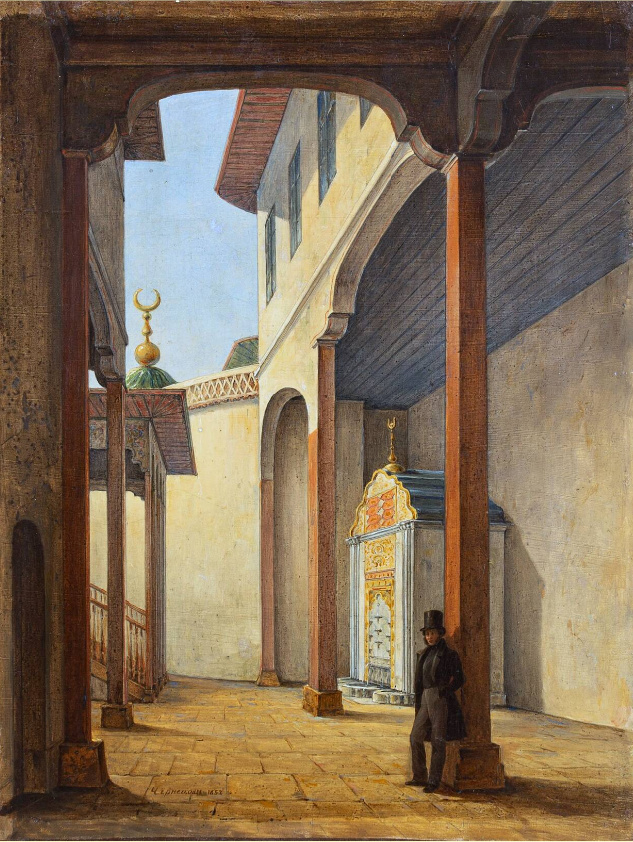
Alexander Pushkin in Bakhchisaray Palace. Painting by Grigory Chernetsov

What is thought to be the first work of literature in the Crimean Tatar language, a version of Yusuf and Zulaykha, was composed around the early thirteenth century, apparently by Mahmud Qırımlı. Alexander Pushkin visited Bakhchysarai in 1820 and later wrote the poem The Fountain of Bakhchisaray. Crimea was the background for Adam Mickiewicz's seminal work, The Crimean Sonnets inspired by his 1825 travel. A series of 18 sonnets constitute an artistic telling of a journey to and through the Crimea, they feature romantic descriptions of the oriental nature and culture of the East which show the despair of an exile longing for the homeland, driven from his home by a violent enemy.

Ivan Aivazovsky, the 19th-century marine painter of Armenian origin, who is considered one of the major artists of his era was born in Feodosia and lived there for the most part of his life. Many of his paintings depict the Black Sea. He also created battle paintings during the Crimean War.

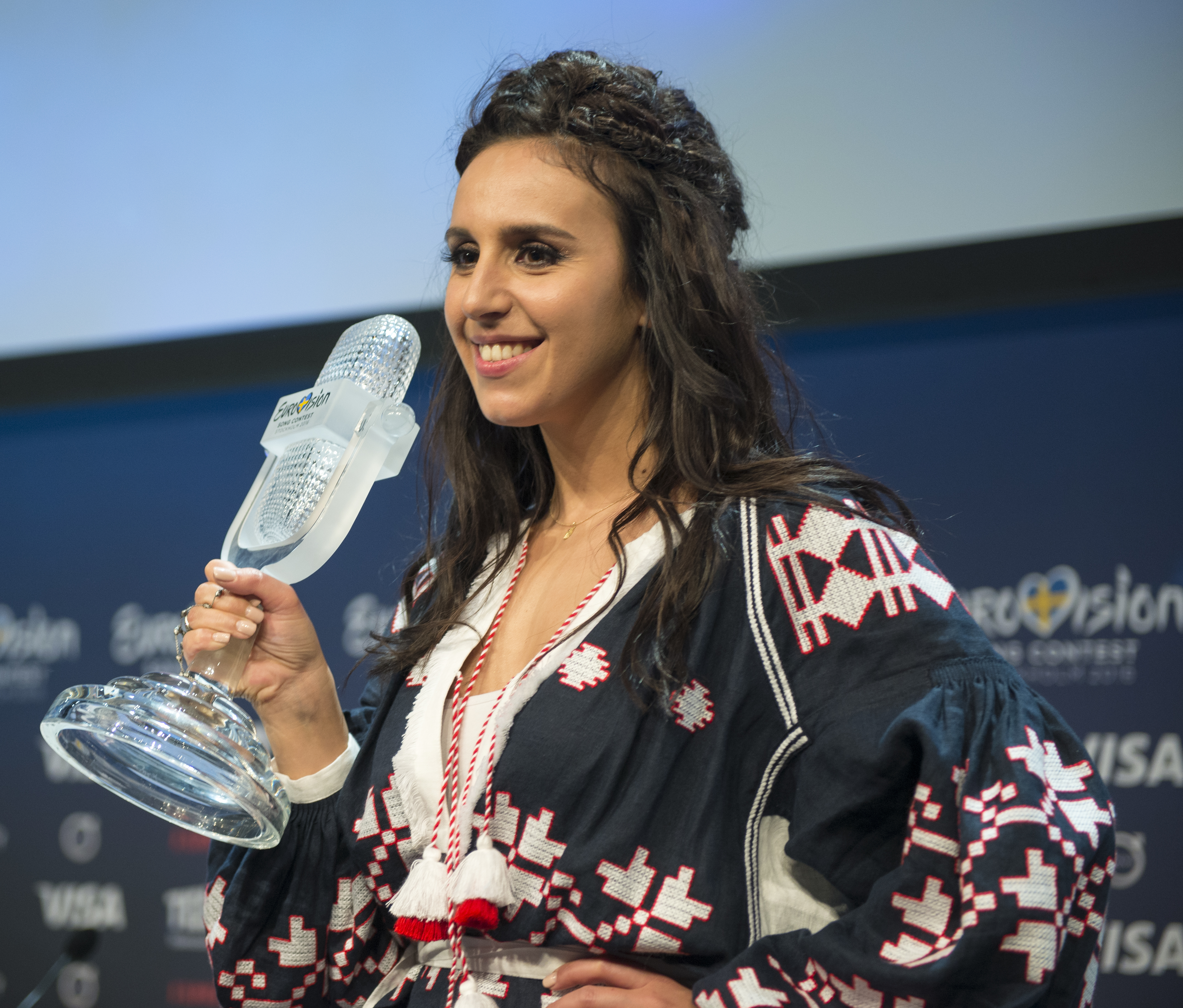
Crimean tatar singer Jamala dedicated her 2016 Eurovision winning song "1944" to the deported Crimean Tatars

Crimean Tatar singer Jamala won the Eurovision Song Contest 2016 representing Ukraine with her song "1944", about the historic deportation of Crimean Tatars in that year by Soviet authorities.

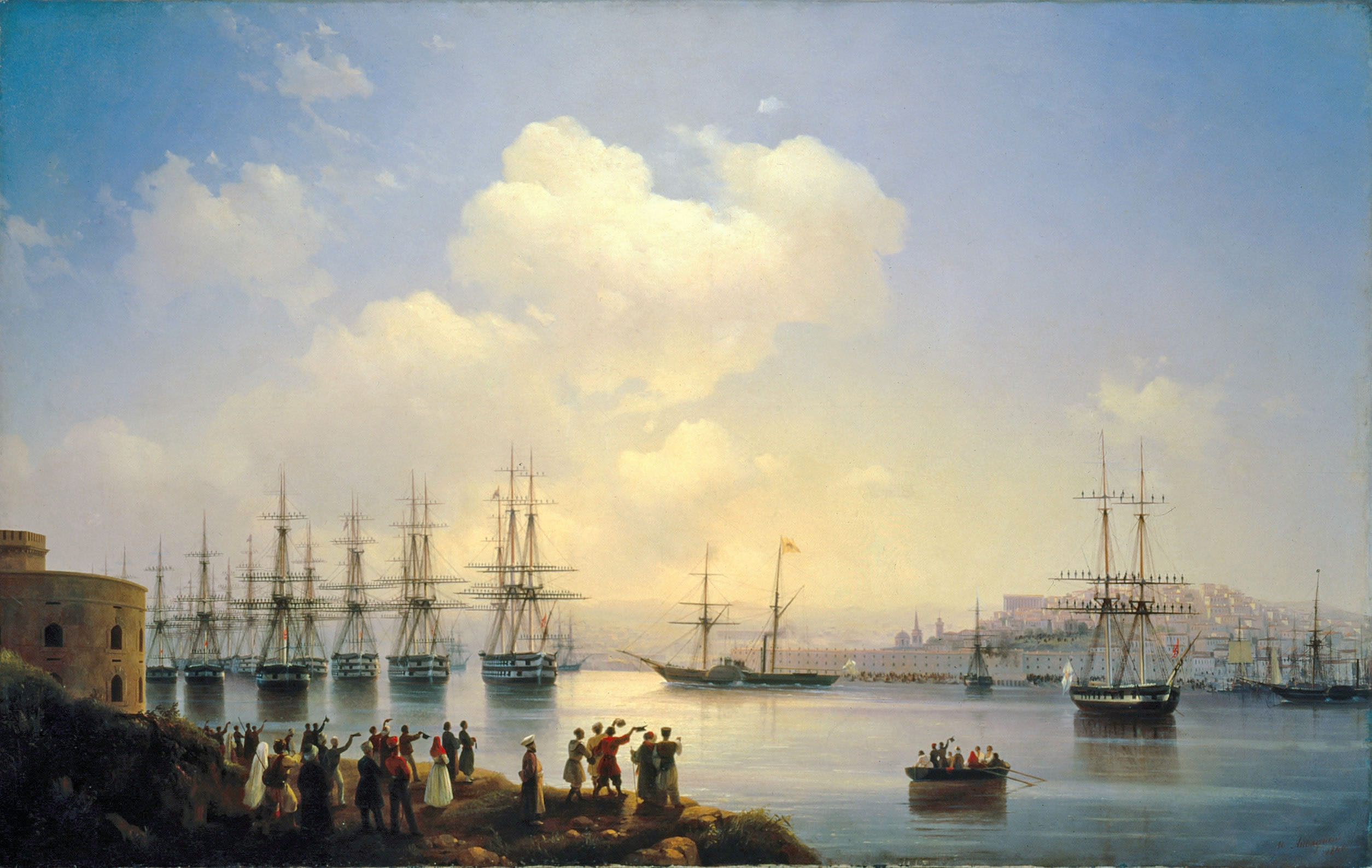
Painting of the Russian squadron in Sevastopol by Ivan Aivazovsky (1846)

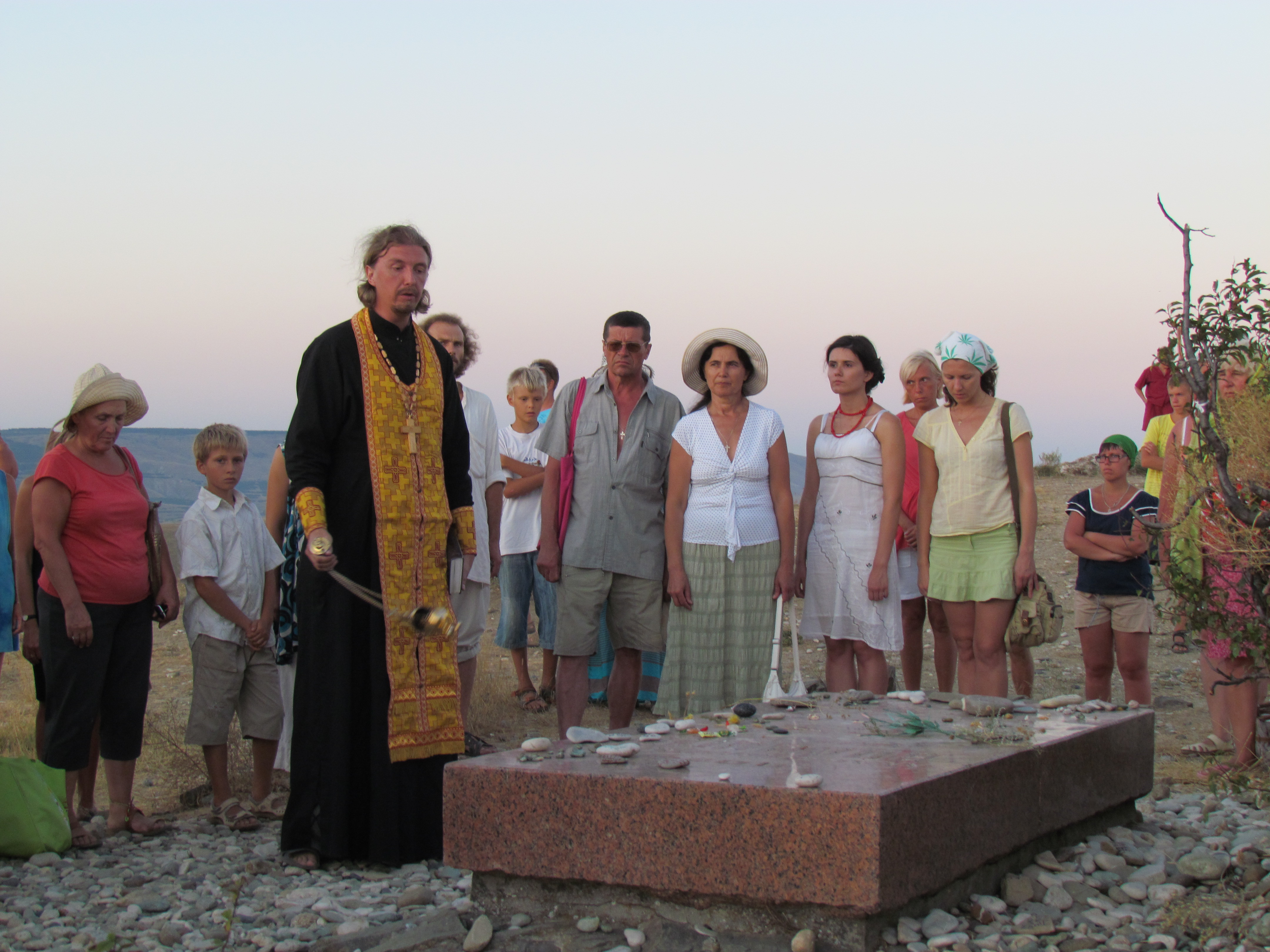
The grave of Russian poet and artist Maximilian Voloshin

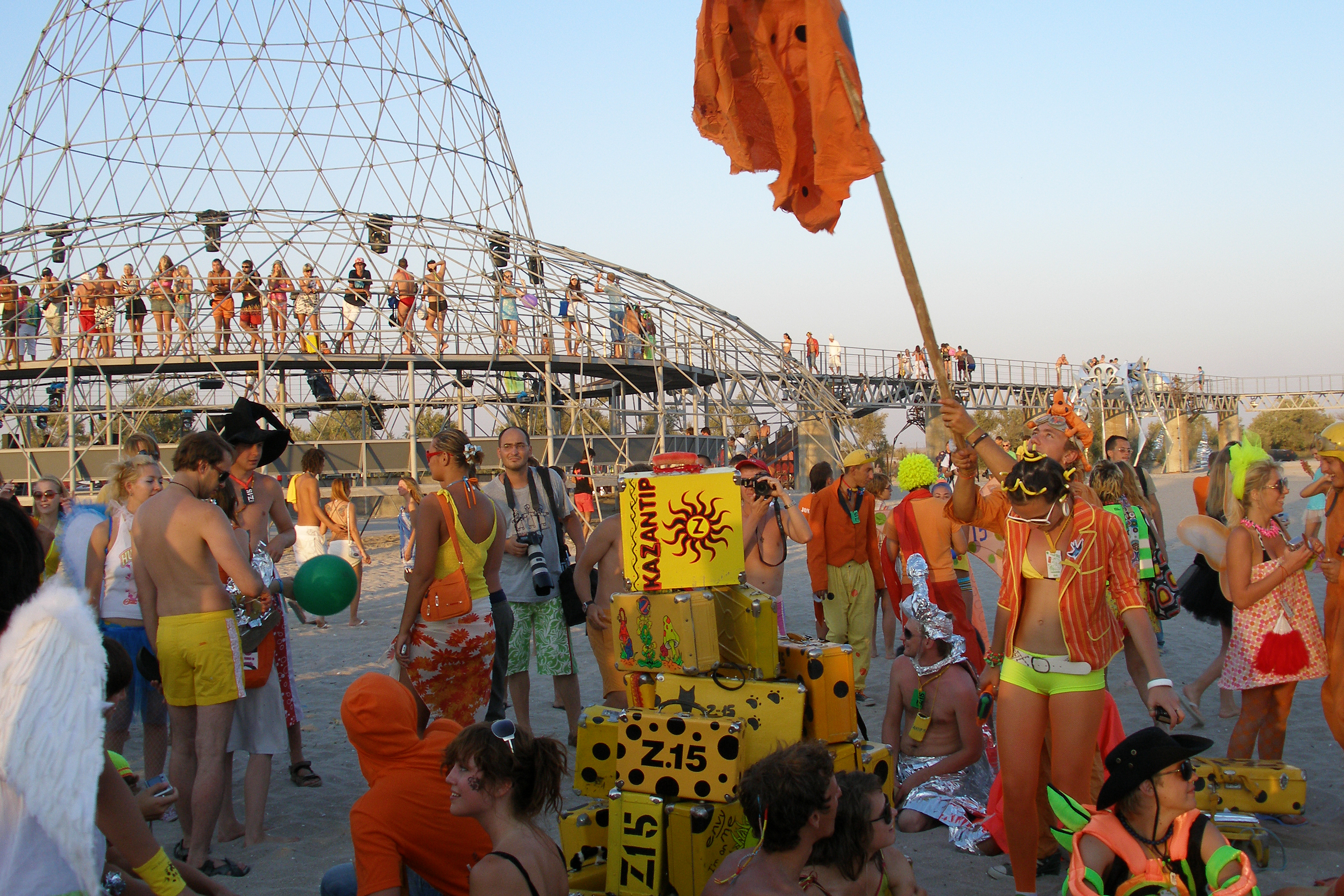
People at the Kazantip music festival in 2007

=== Sport ===
Following Crimea's vote to join Russia and subsequent annexation in March 2014, the top football clubs withdrew from the Ukrainian leagues. Some clubs registered to join the Russian leagues but the Ukrainian Association of Football objected. UEFA ruled that Crimean clubs could not join the Russian leagues but should instead be part of a Crimean league system. The Crimean Premier League is now the top football league in Crimea. On 16 July 2023, FC Sevastopol and FC Rubin Yalta played their first matches in the Russian Second League Division B, the fourth tier: the Ukrainian Association of Football asked UEFA and FIFA to consider excluding the Russian Football Union in response.

Since 2014, a number of Crimean-born athletes have switched from representing Ukraine to representing Russia including Vera Rebrik (javelin), Artem Ivanov (weightlifter), Aleksey Sokirskiy (hammer thrower), and Maksim Oberemko (wind surfer). While Russia was suspended from all international athletic competitions, Rebrik participated in tournaments as a "neutral" athlete.

== Gallery ==
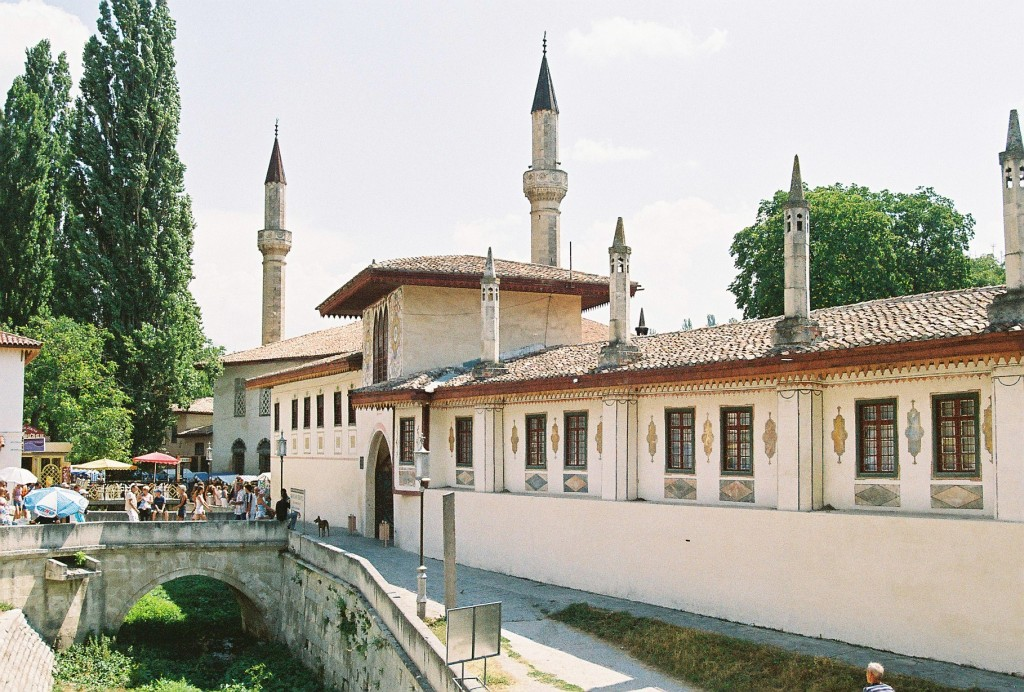
Bakhchisaray Palace

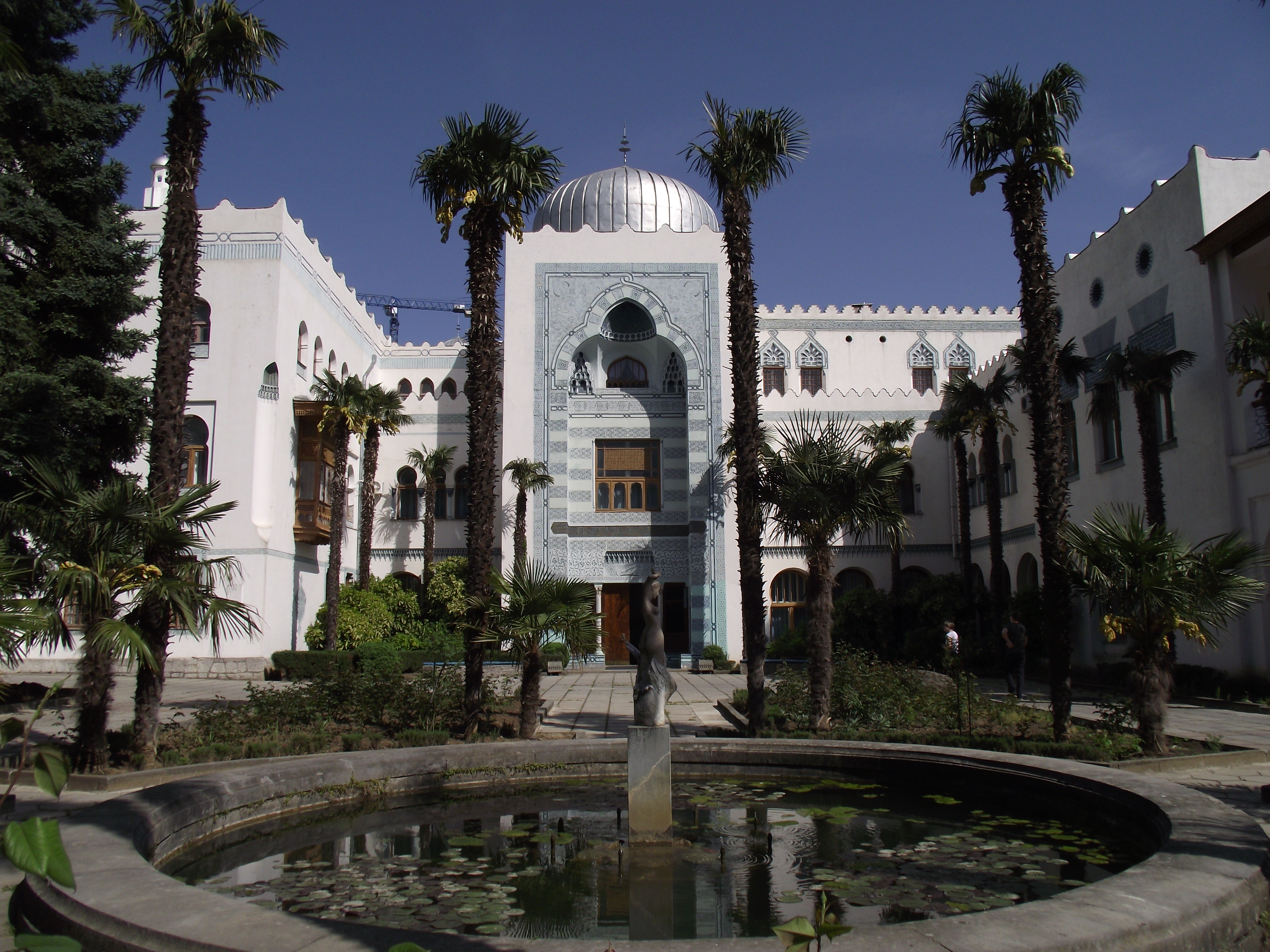
Dulber Palace in Koreiz

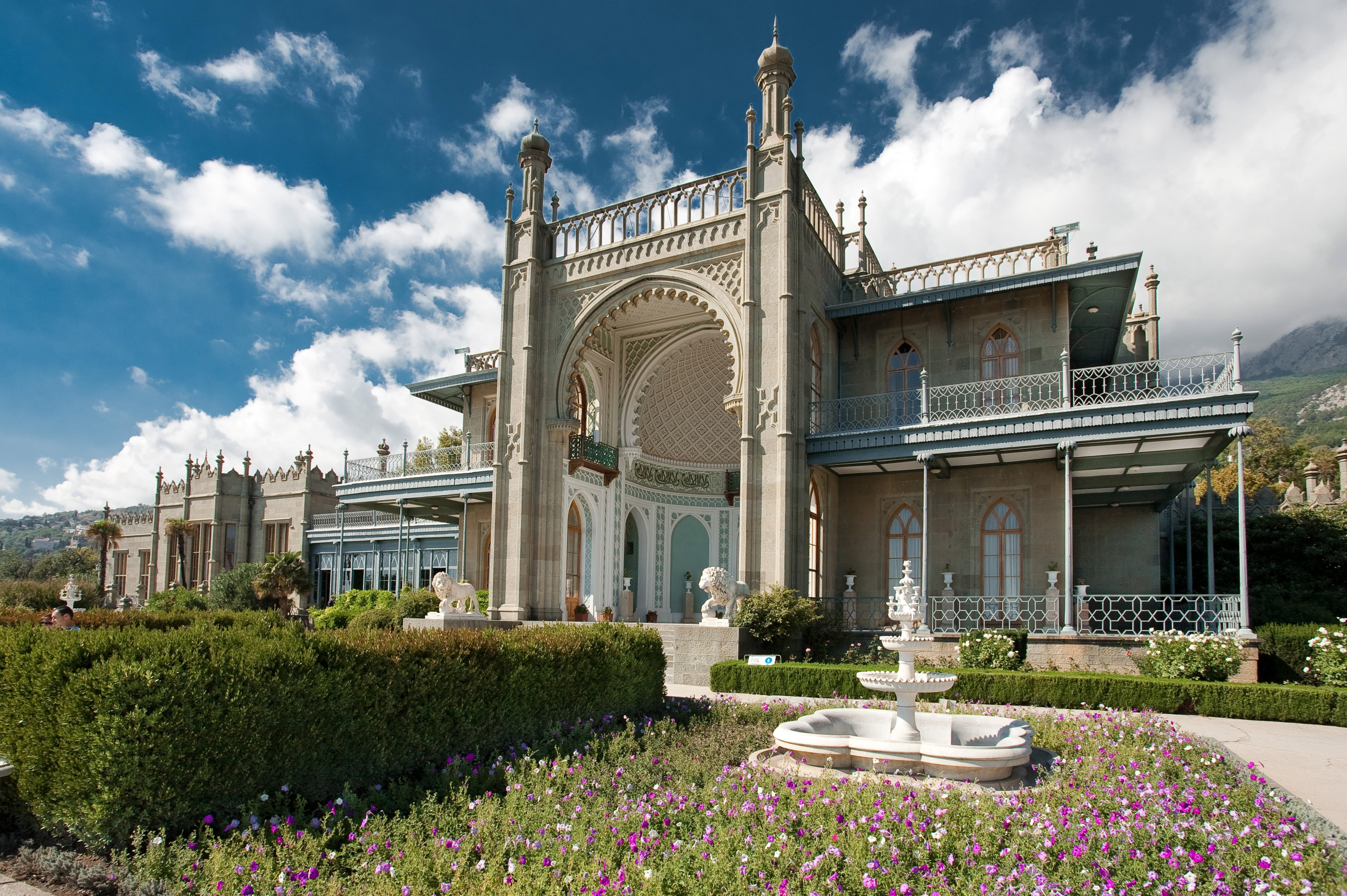
Vorontsov Palace

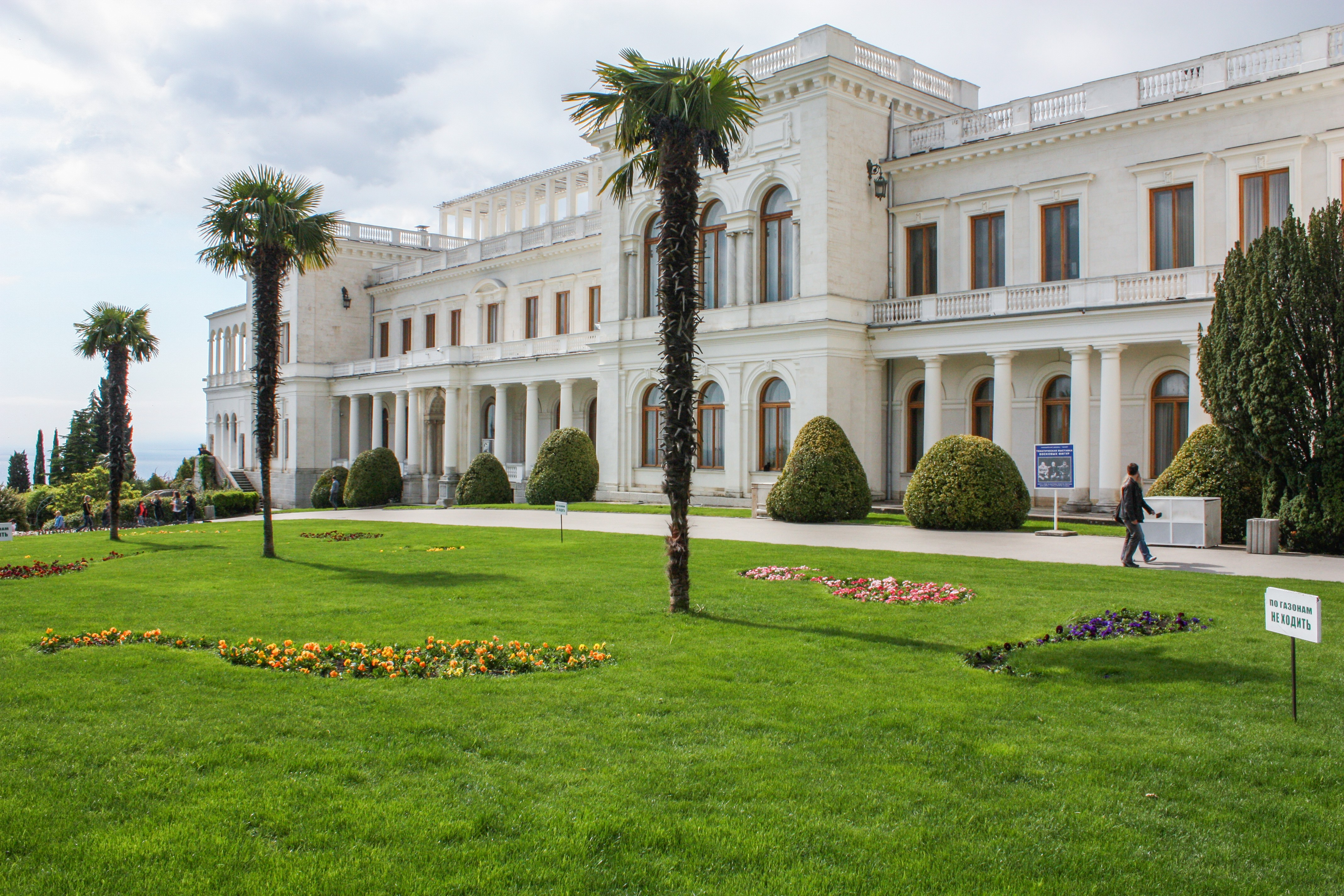
Livadia Palace

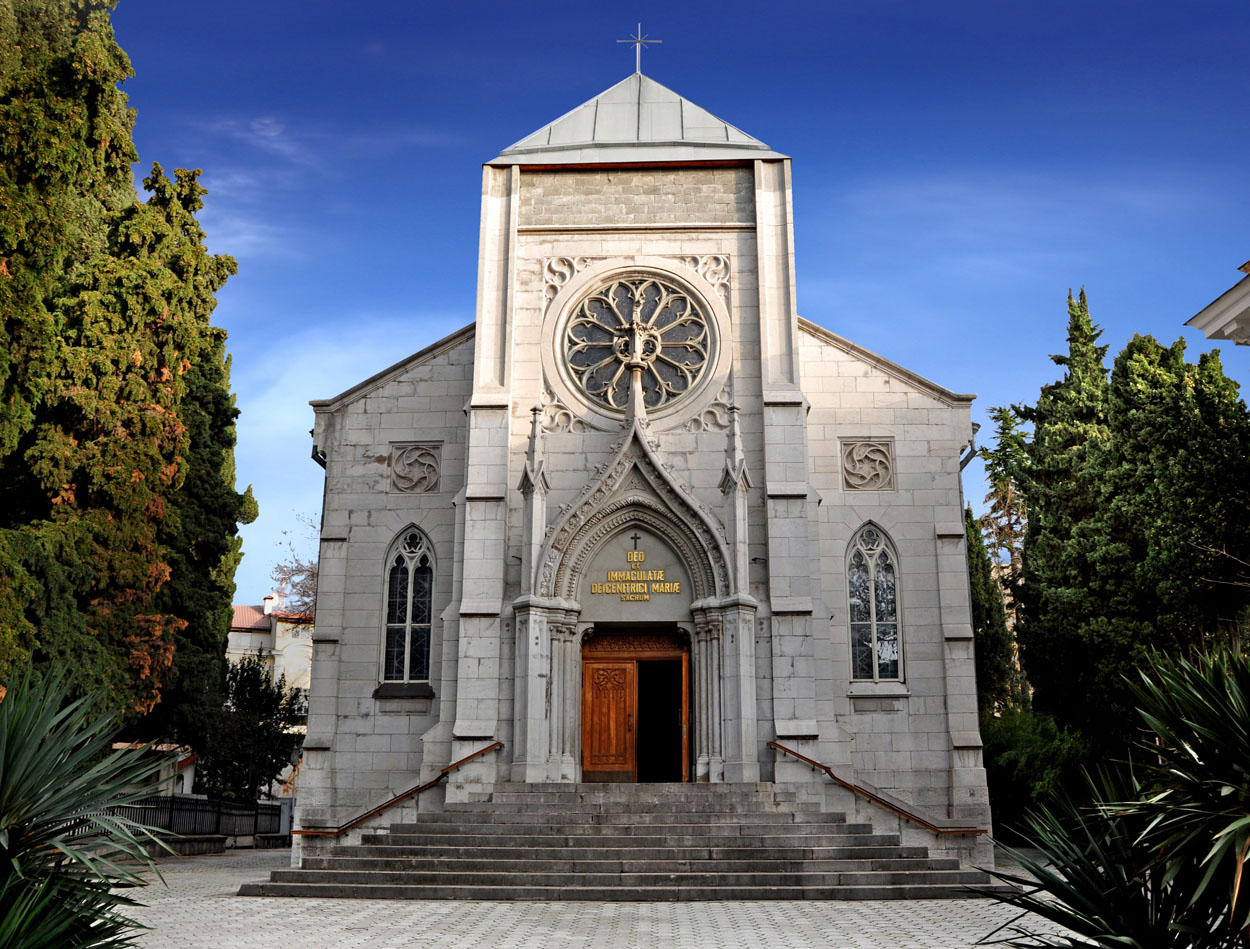
Catholic church in Yalta

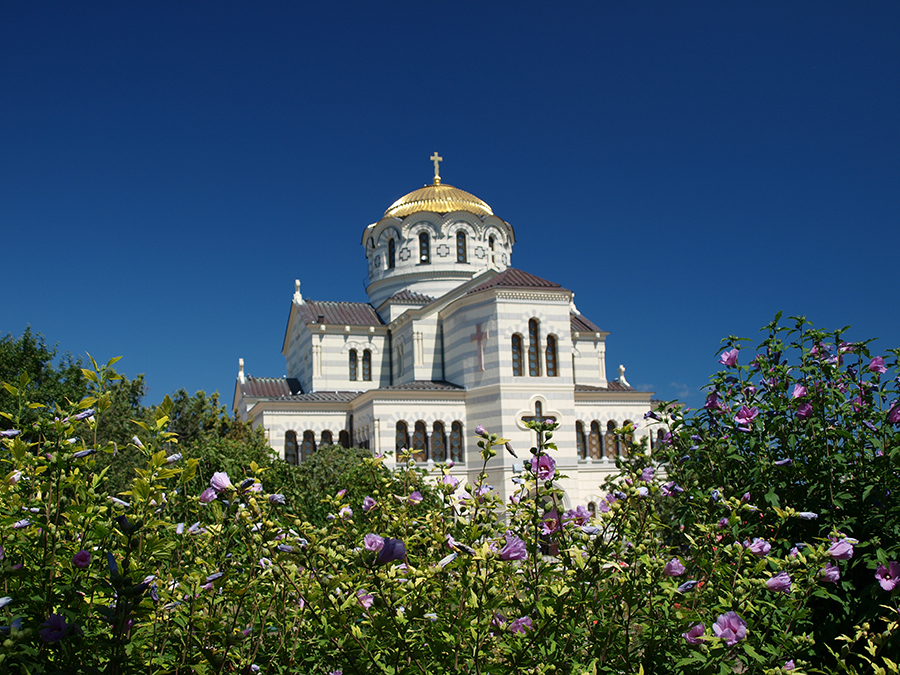
St. Vladimir's Cathedral, dedicated to the Heroes of Sevastopol (Crimean War).

== See also ==
- Russo-Ukrainian war
- Crimean Gothic
- List of cities in Crimea
- Russian–Ukrainian Friendship Treaty of 1997

== Sources ==
- Sulimirski, Tadeusz; Taylor, T. F. (1991). "The Scythians". In Boardman, John; Edwards, I. E. S.; Hammond, N. G. L.; Sollberger, E.; Walker, C. B. F. (eds.). The Assyrian and Babylonian Empires and other States of the Near East, from the Eighth to the Sixth Centuries B.C. The Cambridge Ancient History. Vol. 3. Cambridge, United Kingdom: Cambridge University Press. pp. 547–590. ISBN 978-1-139-05429-4.
