= Massandra (disambiguation) =

Massandra is an urban-type settlement in the Yalta Municipality in Crimea.

Massandra may also refer to:

- Massandra Accords, official agreements signed in 1993 between Ukraine and the Russian Federation
- Massandra Palace, Châteauesque villa of Emperor Alexander III of Russia in Crimea
- Massandra Winery, winery in Crimea
- 3298 Massandra, a minor planet
