= Rūdolfs Pērle =

Latvian artist

- Born: 9 May 1875; Bilska parish, Livonian Governorate, Russian Empire, (Now Latvia
- Died: 17 June 1917 (aged 42); Petrograd, Russian Empire
- Known for: Painting
- Movement: Symbolism

Rūdolfs Pērle (1875, present-day Bilska Parish – 1917, Saint Petersburg) was a Latvian painter. For a large part of his life, he specialised in producing still lifes, but widened his artistic range following his experiences during World War I and is today recognised as an important Latvian Symbolist.

== Biography ==
Rūdolfs Pērle was born in northern Latvia in a family of blacksmiths and originally studied to become a gardener. While studying, his talent for drawing still lifes of flowers was discovered and he was encouraged to pursue art studies at the Saint Petersburg Art and Industry Academy. In 1899 he enrolled in the class of textile design and still life painting, led by his countryman Jūlijs Jaunkalniņš. At the academy, he became friends with other Latvian art students, including Burkards Dzenis, Gustavs Šķilters, Pēteris Krastiņš and Aleksandrs Romans, and he joined the association of young Latvian artists known as Rūķis. When he had finished his studies, he stayed in Saint Petersburg, having a daytime job in a factory and pursuing his artistic interests in his free time. While not widely recognised in the erstwhile capital of the Russian Empire, his works were exhibited in Riga, the present-day capital of his native Latvia. At the outbreak of World War I, Rūdolfs Pērle was sent as an expert on military observation balloons by his employer, who manufactured them, to the front in the Caucasus. Encountering the wild and mountainous landscape and the destruction brought by the war provided strong inspiration for Pērle, who in the last years of his life thus came to adopt new and darker themes and modes of expression. He died on 17 June 1917 in Petrograd due to complications after surgery of appendicitis.

== Art ==
Rūdolfs Pērle was a painter who used a variety of techniques, from watercolour to ink drawings; he picked up oil painting only as late as 1916. Until then, his oeuvre mostly consisted of still lifes of flowers, but following his impressions during the war, he began an intense production of oneiric, expressive landscapes, characterised by an atmosphere of desolation. He has been compared to his contemporary Lithuanian artist colleague Mikalojus Konstantinas Čiurlionis and described as an important representative of Symbolism within Latvian art. In recent years, a double exhibition featuring the works of Pērle and Čiurlionis was on display in Riga (2014) and works by Rūdolfs Pērle also featured in the exhibition Âmes sauvages. Le symbolisme dans les pays baltes held at the Musée d'Orsay in Paris in 2018.

== Gallery ==
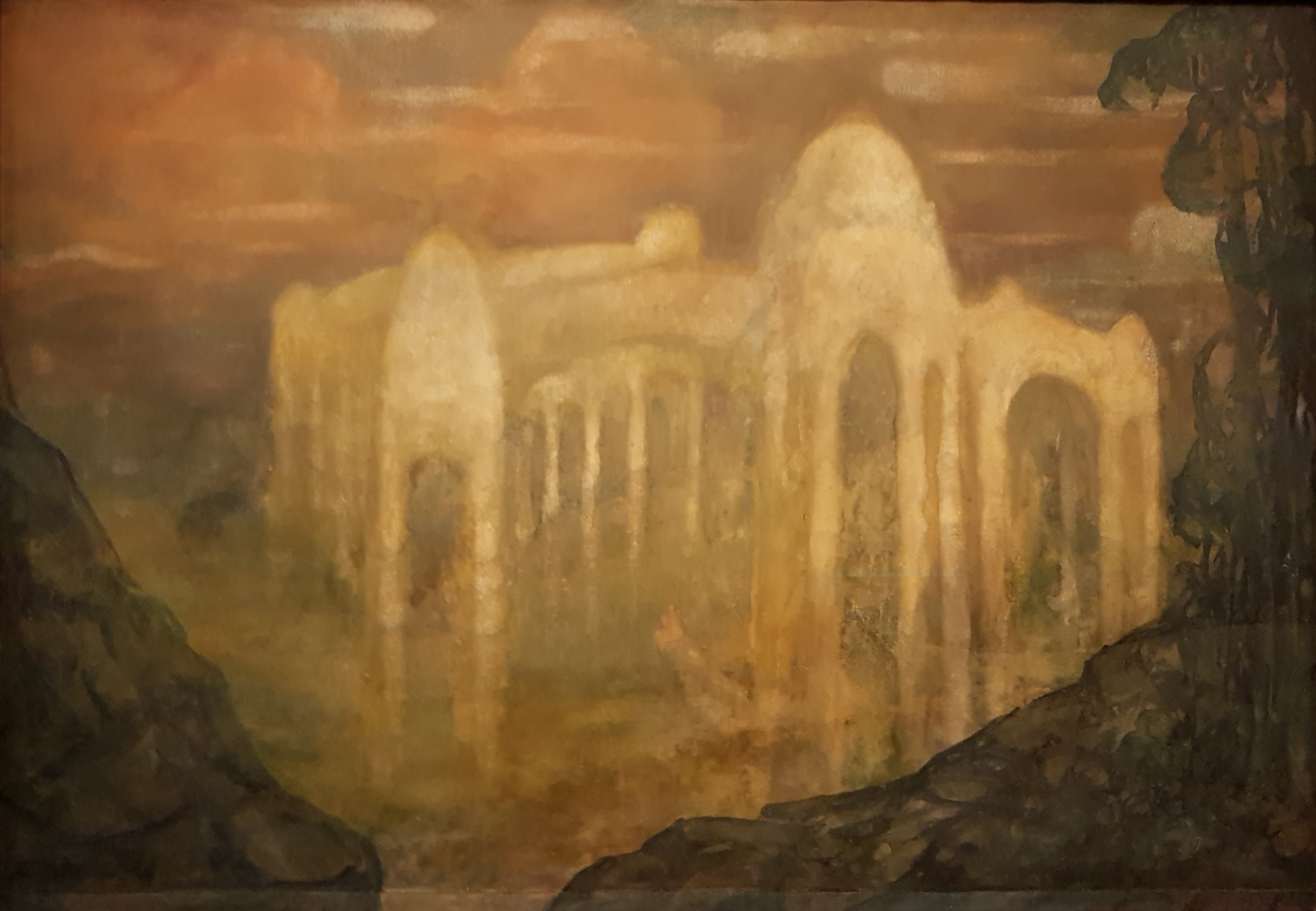
Brīnumu pils (Imaginary castle) (1915)

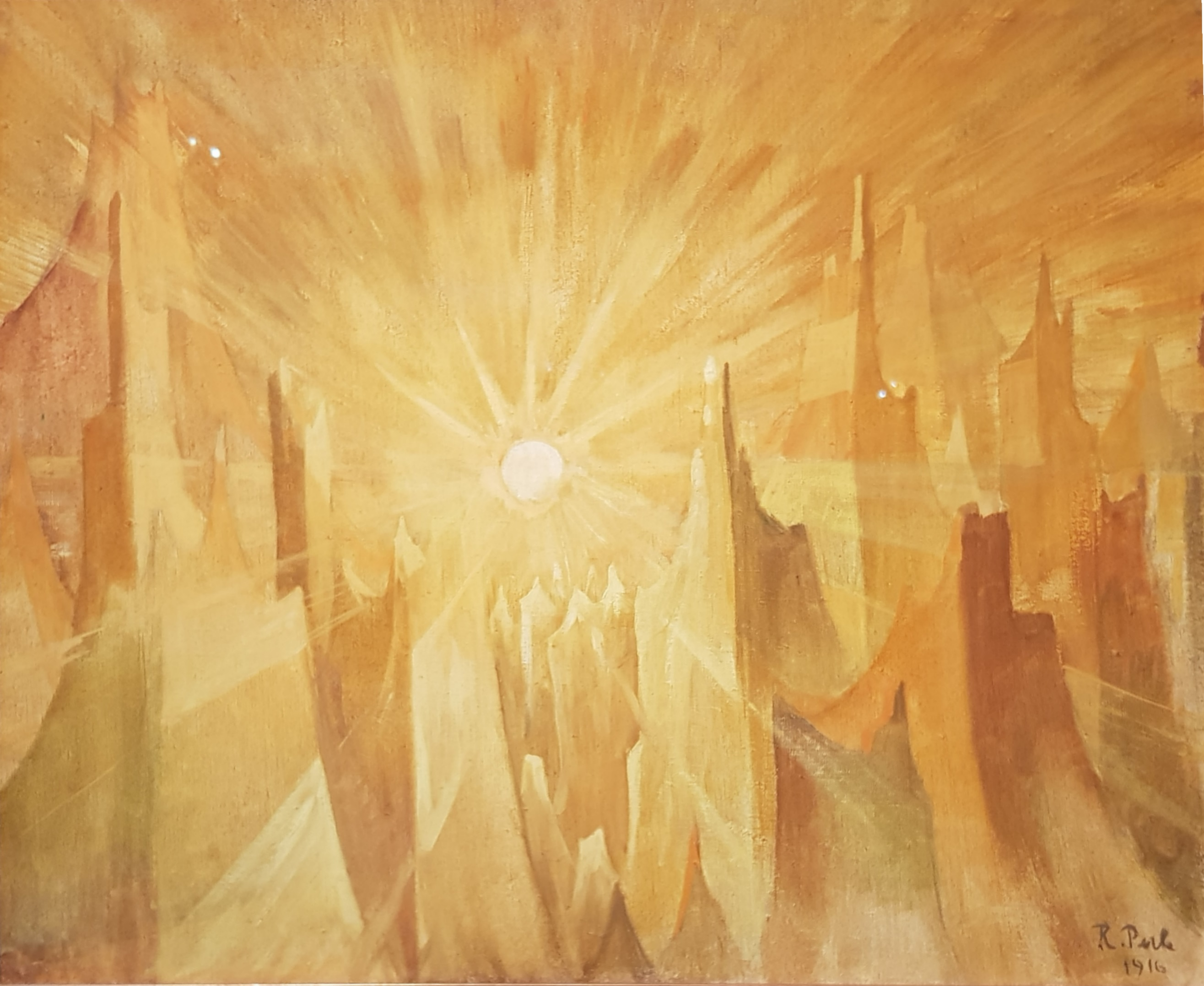
Saule (Sun) (1916)

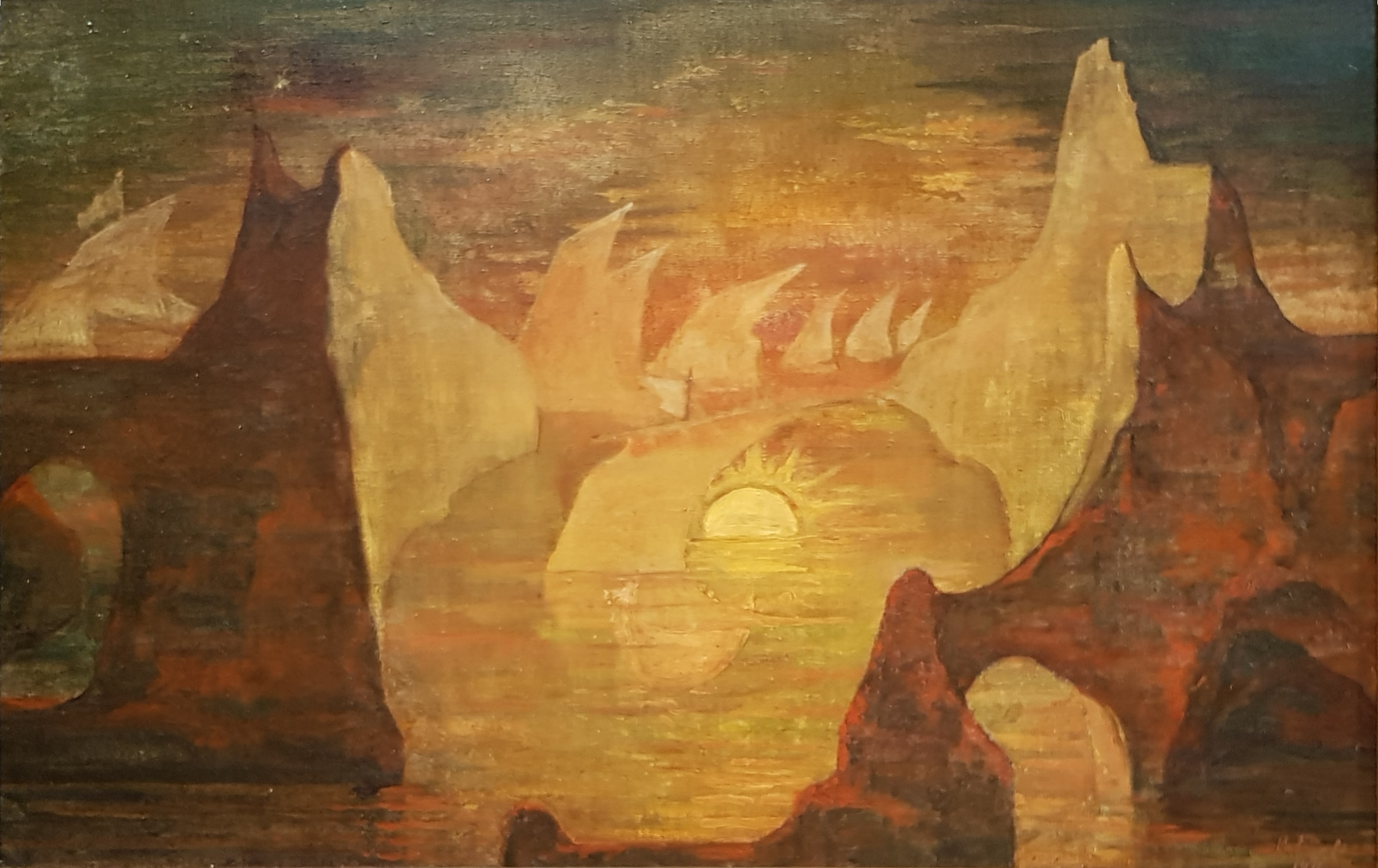
Saulīt vēlu vakarā (The sun at dusk - motif from a folk song) (1916)

== Bibliography ==
- Lamberga, Dace (2014). Rūdolfs Pērle. Riga: Neputns. ISBN 978-9934-512-22-3.
