= Maximilian Messmacher =

Russian painter (1852–1906)

- Максимилиан Месмахер
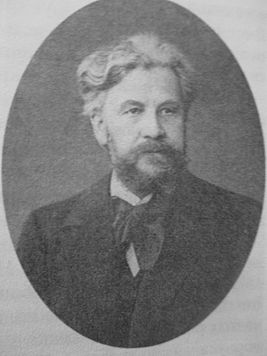
- Maximilian v. Messmacher
- Born: March 21, 1842; Saint Petersburg, Russia
- Died: September 4, 1906 (aged 64); Dresden, Germany
- Education: Member Academy of Arts (1872); Professor by rank (1890)
- Alma mater: Imperial Academy of Arts (1866)
- Known for: Architecture
- Notable work: Massandra Palace, Alexis Palace, Saint Petersburg Art and Industry Academy
- Awards: Big Gold Medal of the Imperial Academy of Arts (1866)

Maximilian (von) Messmacher (Russian: Максимилиан Егорович Месмахер, romanized: Maksimilian Yegorovich Messmakher; 21 March 1842 – 4 September 1906) was a Russian architect of German ancestry.

He attended the School of Painting of St. Petersburg Society for the Encouragement of Arts and thereafter the Imperial Academy of Arts, graduating in 1866. He was Professor of artistic and industrial painting as well as the history of decorative styles. He also developed a coherent system of academic training in arts. His main activities are however related to architecture and interior decoration. He engaged in the architecture and interior decoration of palaces of the members of the imperial family and of the mansions of aristocrats, as well as of several churches.

== Biography ==
Messmacher was born in Saint Petersburg in 1842. He attended a high school in Saint Petersburg from 1850 to 1857 and thereafter the School of Painting of St. Petersburg Society for the Encouragement of Arts. Finally, in 1866 he graduated from the Imperial Academy of Fine Arts, receiving the gold medal for his graduation project.

He visited Italy and old Russian towns as a retainer of the Academy of Fine Arts He brought back over 200 watercolors from this trip, which are preserved at the State Hermitage Department of Drawings. He also took part with Viktor Kossov in the restoration of the ancient theatre of Taormina (Sicily) drawing the plans for the general restoration works and for the façade. For this contribution he was also awarded a degree in architecture (1873)

In 1874, he was appointed professor at the School of Painting of the St. Petersburg Society for the Encouragement of Arts, teaching artistic and industrial painting as well as the history of decorative styles. In 1877-1879 he worked with A, Schambacher on the reconstruction of the school's building

In 1879, he was promoted director of Baron von Stieglitz's Central School of Technical Drawing. In this capacity he developed a coherent system of academic training, an essential contribution to the development of art education in Russia.

His main activities are however related to architecture and interior decoration. He engaged in the architecture and interior decoration of palaces of the members of the imperial family and of the mansions of aristocrats. Messmacher's most significant works in St. Petersburg are: the palaces of the Grand Duke Alexei Alexandrovich and of the Grand Duke Mikhail Mikhailovich as well as the interior decorations of the palaces of Grand Duke Vladimir Alexandrovich, of Grand Duke Pavel Alexandrovich as well as of the Anichkov Palace. He also worked on the Palace of Tsar Alexander III in Massandra, Crimea, which was finished after the tsar's assassination. Messmacher's works are distinctive due to a refined expressiveness of the silhouette, grandeur and diversity of artistic and decorative techniques for the facades and for the interiors. Eclecticism. Part of his work also concerned the design and decoration of churches, Messmacher was in charge of the restoration of Saint Isaac's Cathedral and in 1882 was appointed the chief architect of the church), One of Messmacher's last works is the interior of the St. Peter's Lutheran Church (1895–97).

After 1897, Maximilan Messmacher moved to Germany and worked mostly there. He died in 1906 in Dresden, Germany and is interred at the Lutheran cemetery Johannisfriedhof, Dresden.

== Main projects ==
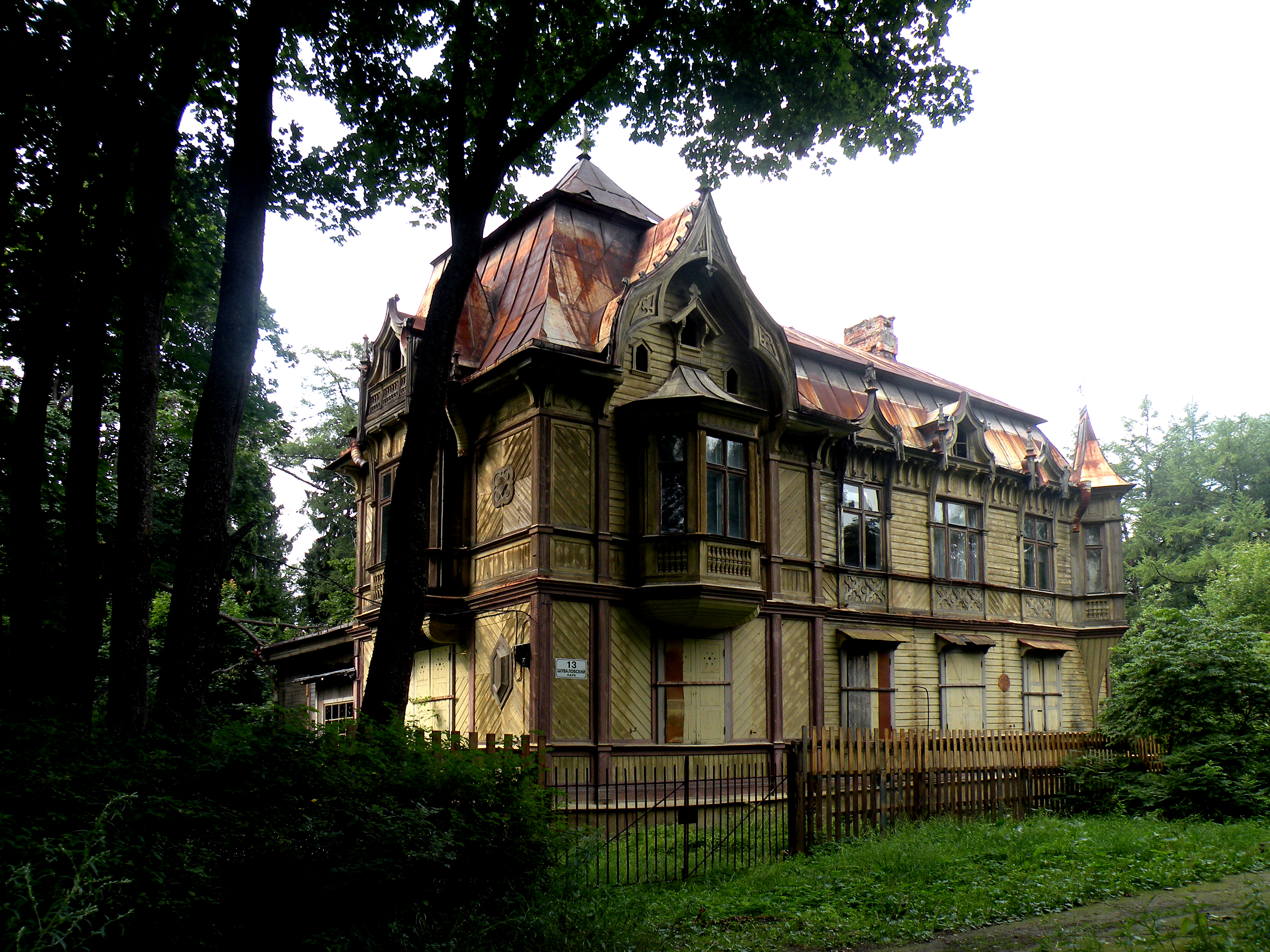
Messmacher's own dacha in Pargolovo

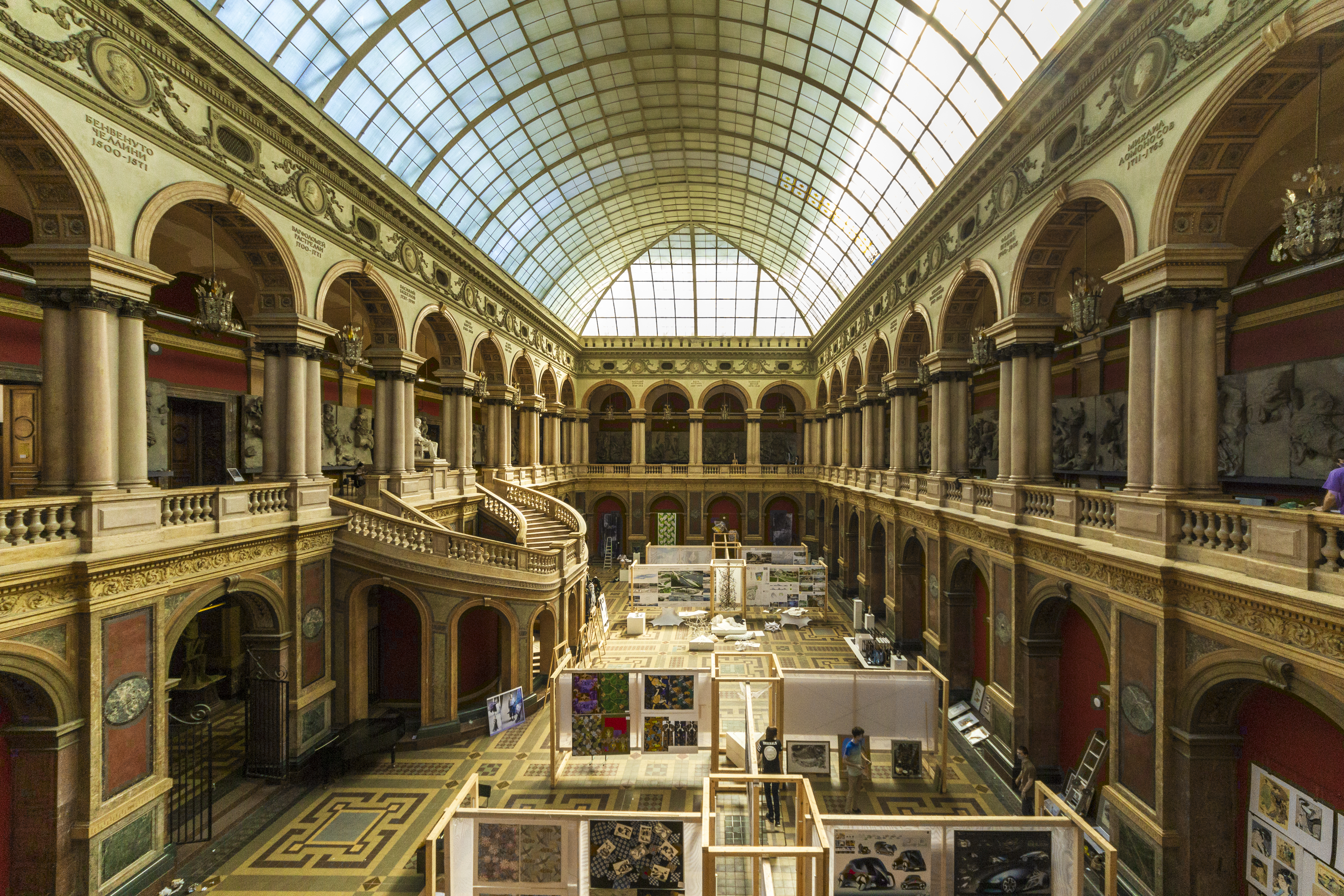
The central hall of the Stieglitz Museum

- Interior decoration of the residence of Prince Gagarin (1873–1874) on Bolshaya Morskaya Street Nr.45
- Icon screen of the Smolny Convent (1873–1875)
- Church of Saints Kosma and Damyan at the Guards Battalion on Kirochnaya Street Nr. 28a (1876–1879)
- Reconstruction of the Building of the Society for the Encouragement of Arts on Bolshaya Morskaya Street Nr. 38 (1877–1878)
- Restoration of Saint Isaac's Cathedral (1877–1888)
- Decoration of the private chapel of Count Stroganov on Tchaikovsky Street Nr. 11 (1878–1879)
- Interior decoration of the Vladimir Palace on Dvortsovy Embankment Nr. 26 (1882–1885)
- Palace of Grand Duke Alexei Alexandrovich on Moika Embankment Nr. 122 (1882–1885)
- Building of the State Archives on Millionnaya Street Nr. 36
- Building of Baron von Stieglitz's Central School of Technical Drawing on Solyanoi Lane Nr. 13 (1885–1886)
- Palace of Grand Duke Mikhail Mikhailovich on Admiralty Embankment Nr. 8 (1885–1888)
- Building of the Stieglitz Museum on Solyanoi Lane Nr.15 (1885–1896)
- Interior decoration of the Anichkov Palace on Nevsky Prospekt Nr. 39 (1886–1887)
- Manege and stables of N.M. Polovtsov on the Kryukov Canal Embankment Nr. 12 (1887)
- Interior decoration of the Palace of Grand Duke Pavel Alexandrovich on Angliyskaya Embankment Nr. 68 (1888–1892)
- Interior decoration of the Palace of Grand Duke Vladimir Alexandrovich (1888–1892)
- Interior decoration of the residence of Alexander Alexandrovich Polovtsov on Bolshaya Morskaya Street Nr. 52 (1888–1892)
- Massandra Villa of Tsar Alexander III in the Crimea (1892–1900)
- Interior decoration of St. Peter's Lutheran Church on Nevsky Prospekt Nr. 22-24 (1896–1899)

== See also ==
- List of Russian artists

== Sources ==
- "Месмахер, Максимилиан Егорович" . Brockhaus and Efron Encyclopedic Dictionary (in Russian). 1906.
