= Pēteris Krastiņš =

Latvian artist

Pēteris Krastiņš (1882, Valmiera district – 1942, Riga) was a Latvian painter.

== Biography ==
Pēteris Krastiņš came from a peasant family from northern Latvia (at the time part of the Russian Empire). He studied art between 1898 and 1901 in the tradition of Realism. After receiving his diploma, he continued his studies at the Saint Petersburg Art and Industry Academy in what was at the time the capital of the Russian Empire, Saint Petersburg. He stayed at the academy until 1907, specializing in the design of theatrical decor. After his studies he traveled widely across Europe, partially funded by a scholarship, and visited Berlin, Dresden, Vienna, Paris, Florence and Rome in order to study the art and architecture of these well-known artistic destinations. He stayed for a prolonged time in Florence, sharing accommodation with the Italian artist Filippo Marfori Savini, to whom he had been introduced by his countryman Teodors Zaļkalns. He returned to Latvia in 1911. His mental health had however already begun to deteriorate and at the outbreak of World War I, he was taken in at a mental hospital in Riga, and would stay there until 1942, when he was killed by the Nazis during the German occupation of Latvia during World War II.

== Art ==
Pēteris Krastiņš was a painter, and worked in several different techniques. His art displays influences from Symbolism with a pull towards the fantastic and allegorical, and the sinuousness of Art Nouveau, with certain elements also indicating an influence from Expressionism.

== Bibliography ==
- Ābele, Kristiāna (2006). Pēteris Krastiņš. Riga: Neputns. ISBN 9984-729-72-9.
