= Bilska Parish =

Parish of Latvia

- parish of Latvia
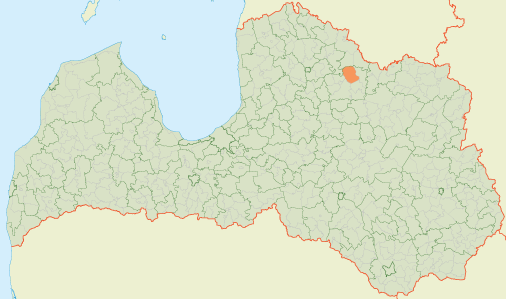
- Coordinates: 57°29′13″N 26°03′40″E
- Country: Latvia

Population (1 January 2026)
  - Total: 1,050

Bilska Parish (Latvian: Bilskas pagasts) is an administrative territorial entity of Smiltene Municipality, Latvia.

Painter Rūdolfs Pērle was born in Bilska Parish.
