= Vladimir Palace =

Imperial palace in Saint Petersburg, Russia

Coordinates: 59.9434°N 30.3196°E

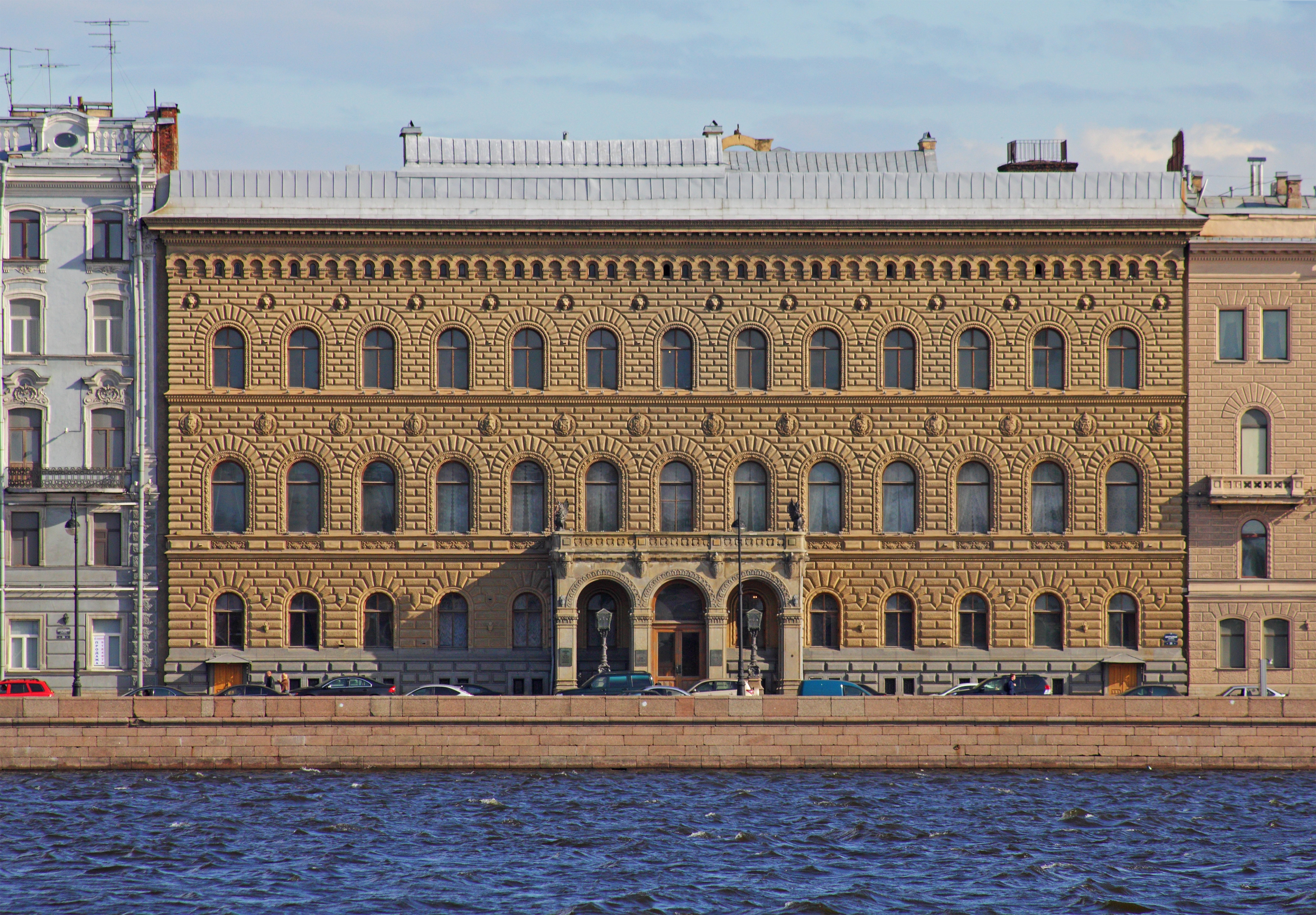
View from the Peter and Paul Fortress

The Vladimir Palace (Russian: Влади́мирский дворе́ц, Vladimirsky dvorets) is the former palace of Grand Duke Vladimir Alexandrovich of Russia, son of Alexander II. It was one of the last imperial palaces to be constructed in Saint Petersburg, Russia. It was designed by a team of architects including Vasily Kenel, Aleksandr Rezanov, Andrei Huhn, Ieronim Kitner, Vladimir Shreter and Maximilian Messmacher. Construction work on the waterfront lasted from 1867 to 1872, additional construction and extensions continued in the 1880s and 1890s. Major restorations were made in the 1980s and in 2010.

Like the Winter Palace and the Marble Palace, the Vladimir Palace is on the waterfront of the South bank of the river Neva; the location on Palace Embankment was extremely prized by the Russian aristocracy. The Neo-renaissance façade, richly ornamented with stucco rustication, was patterned after Leon Battista Alberti's palazzi in Florence. The main porch is built of Bremen sandstone and adorned with griffins, coats-of-arms, and cast-iron lanterns. Other details are cast in portland cement.

The palace and its outbuildings contain some 360 rooms, all decorated in eclectic historic styles: Neo-Renaissance (reception room, parlor), Gothic Revival (dining room), Russian Revival (Oak Hall), Rococo (White Hall), Byzantine style (study), Louis XIV, various oriental styles, and so on. This interior ornamentation, further augmented by Maximilian Messmacher in 1881–1891, is considered by art historians, such as Nikolay Punin, a major monument to the 19th-century passion for historicism. Grand Duke Vladimir decorated his apartments with his collection of Russian paintings by the best artists of his time, such as Ilya Repin, Ivan Aivazovsky, Feodor Bruni, Vasili Vereshchagin, Ivan Kramskoy, Mikhail Vrubel, Nikolai Sverchkov and Rudolf Ferdinandovich Frentz.

After the October Revolution of 1917, the original owners were purged and fled the country. The property was confiscated by the Soviet government. After several years of disputes and uncertainty, in the 1920s the palace and what was left of the interior design was transferred to House of Scientists (Дом Учёных), (named after Maxim Gorky). Under the patronage of Russian Academy of Sciences, the palace and its interior has been preserved to a greater extent than other Romanov family residences. Much attractive tiling, and many internal architectural details have been retained and restored. Also preserved has been much of Vladimir's collection of late 19th-century porcelain, most of it manufactured in the Imperial Porcelain Factory, and painted or decorated by its leading artists. The collection has been extended to include interesting porcelain from the early Soviet period, including figures of Chaliapin and Nijinsky, as well as vases and dinner services inspired by constructivism.

== Interior ==
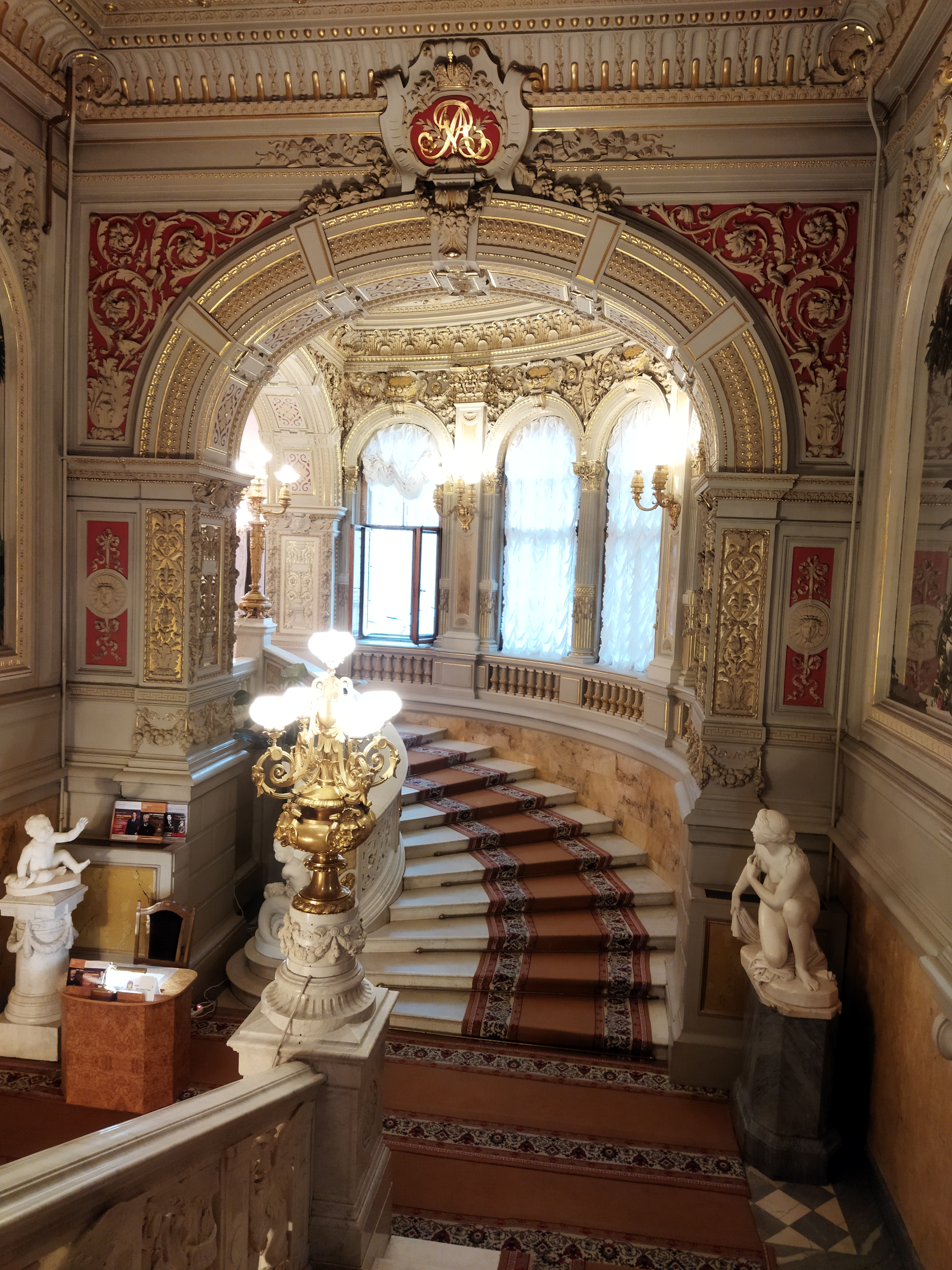

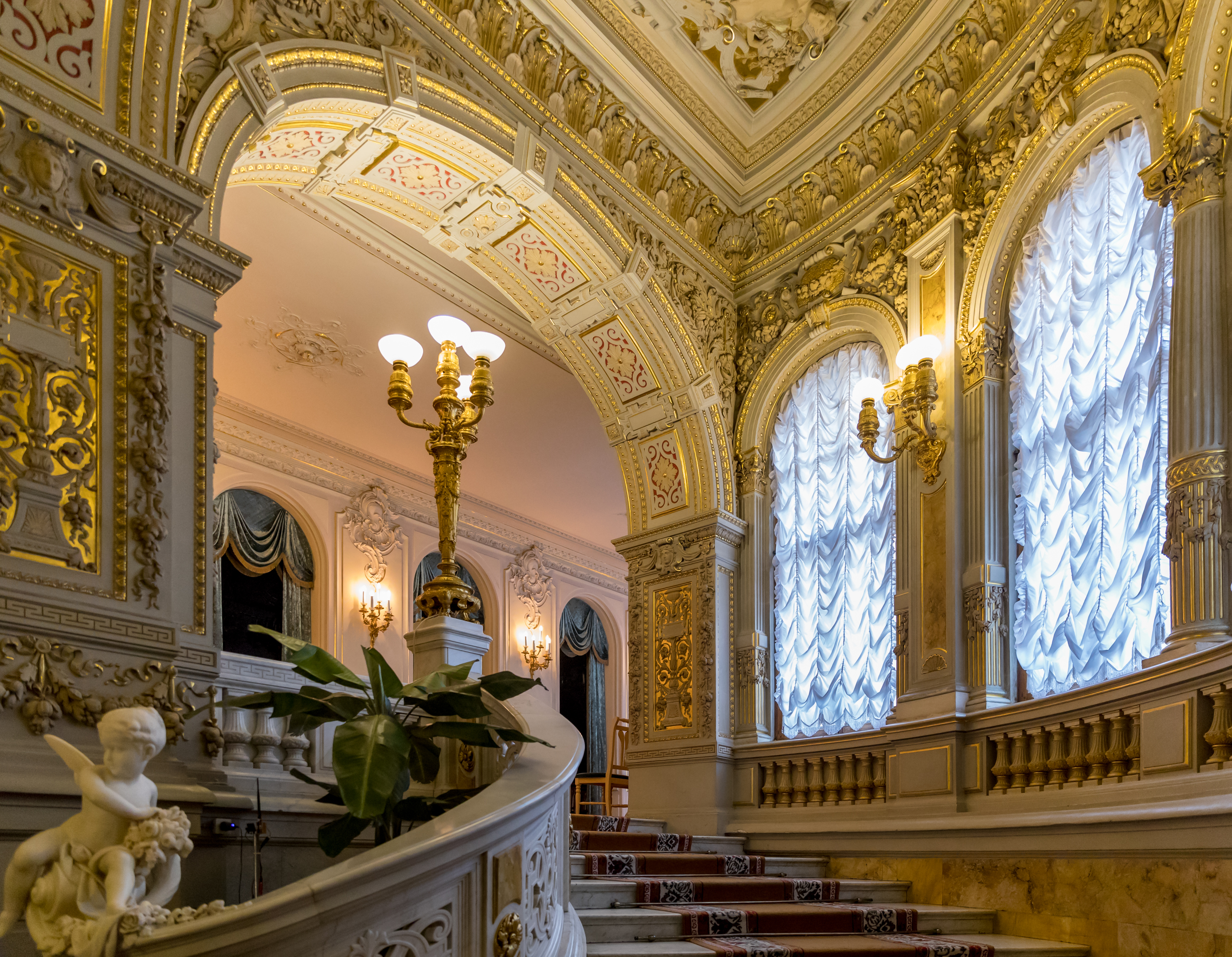

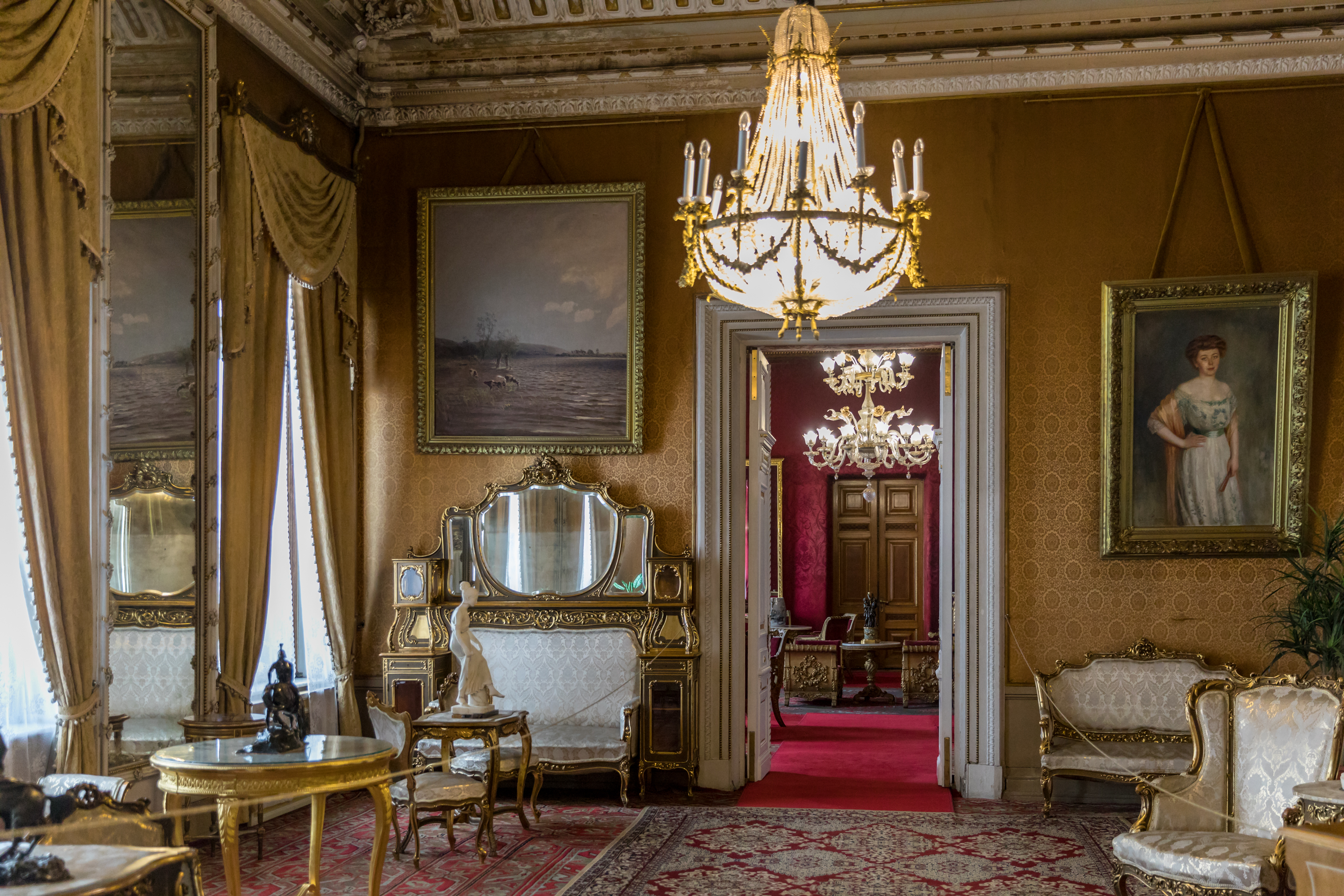

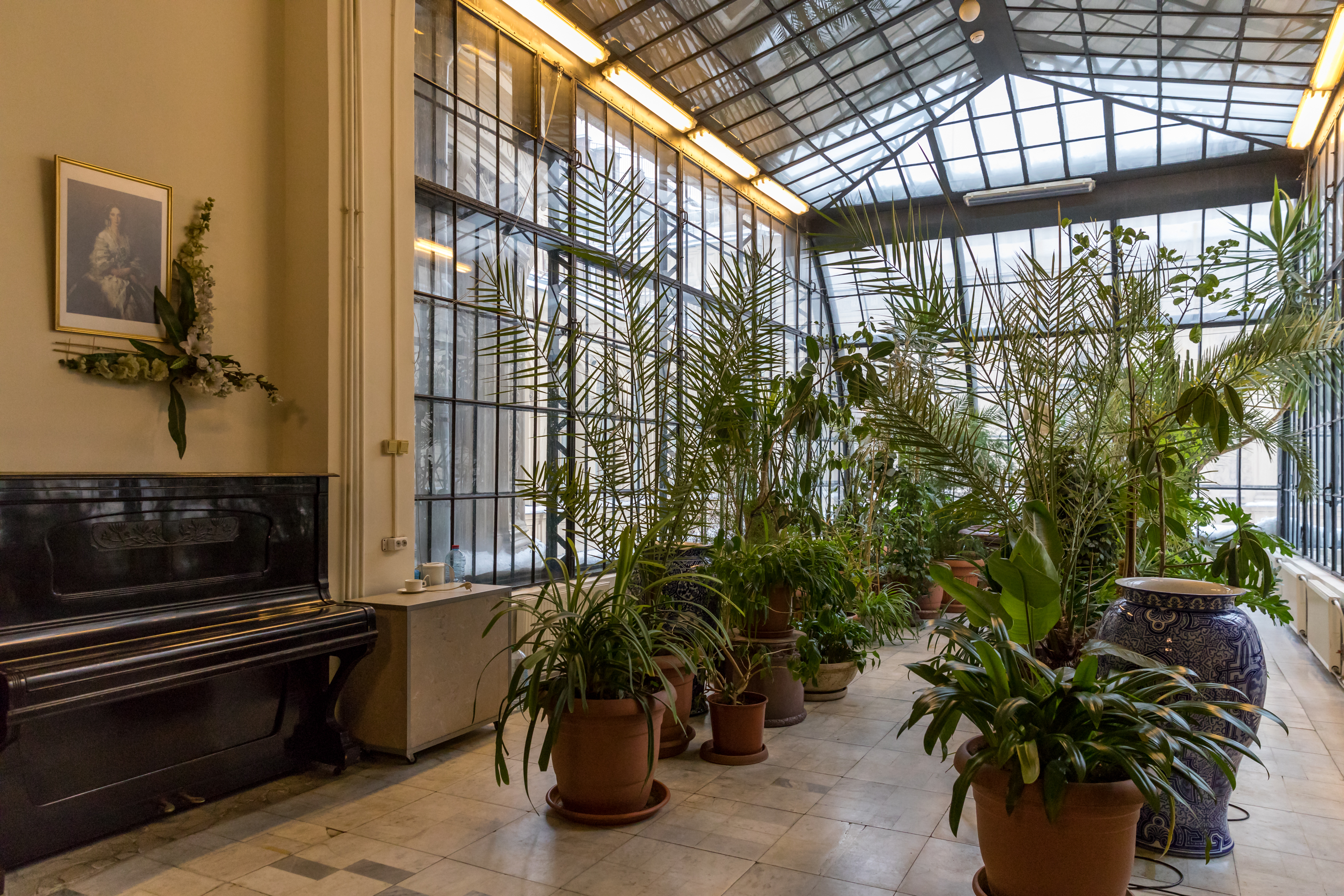

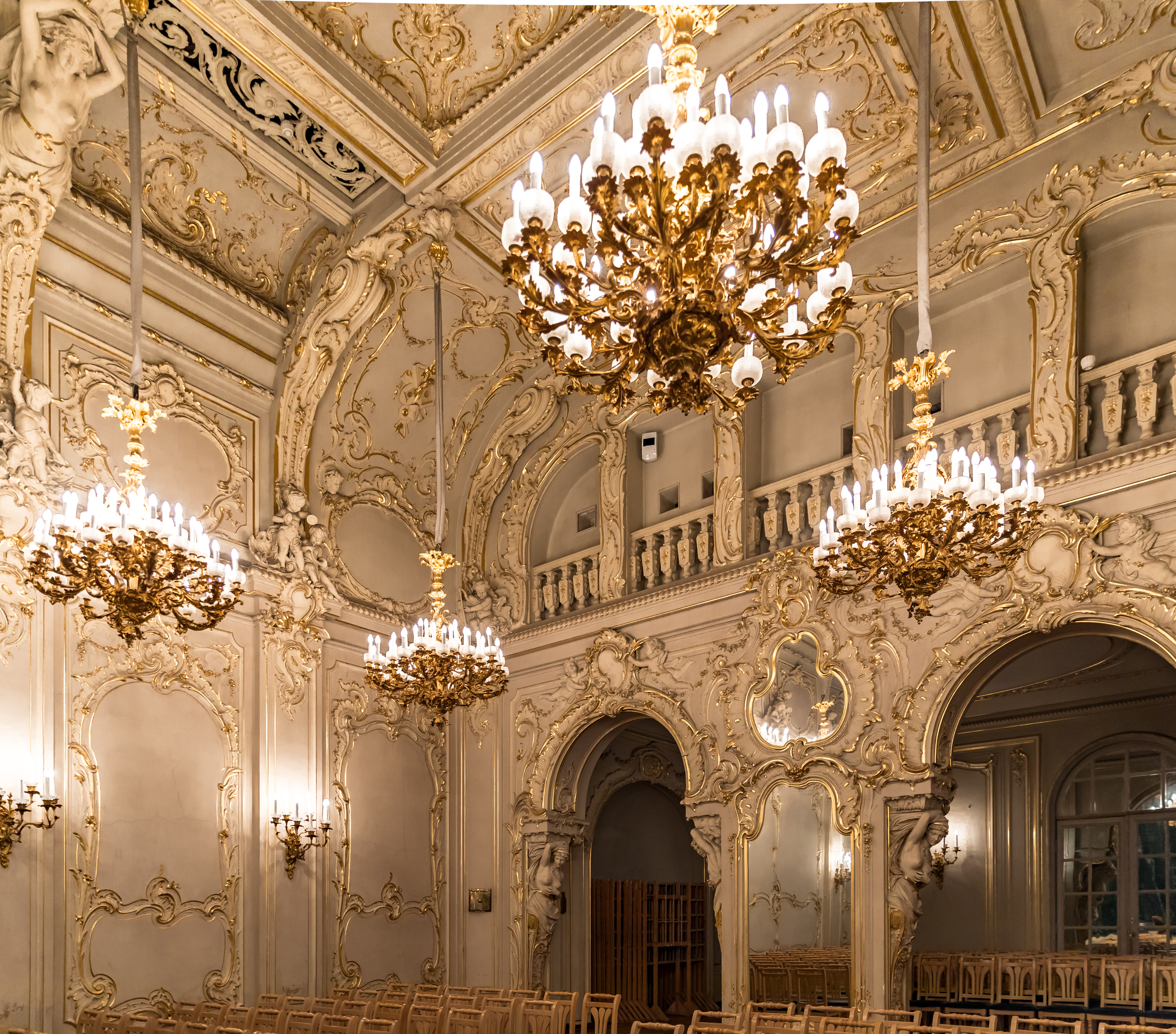

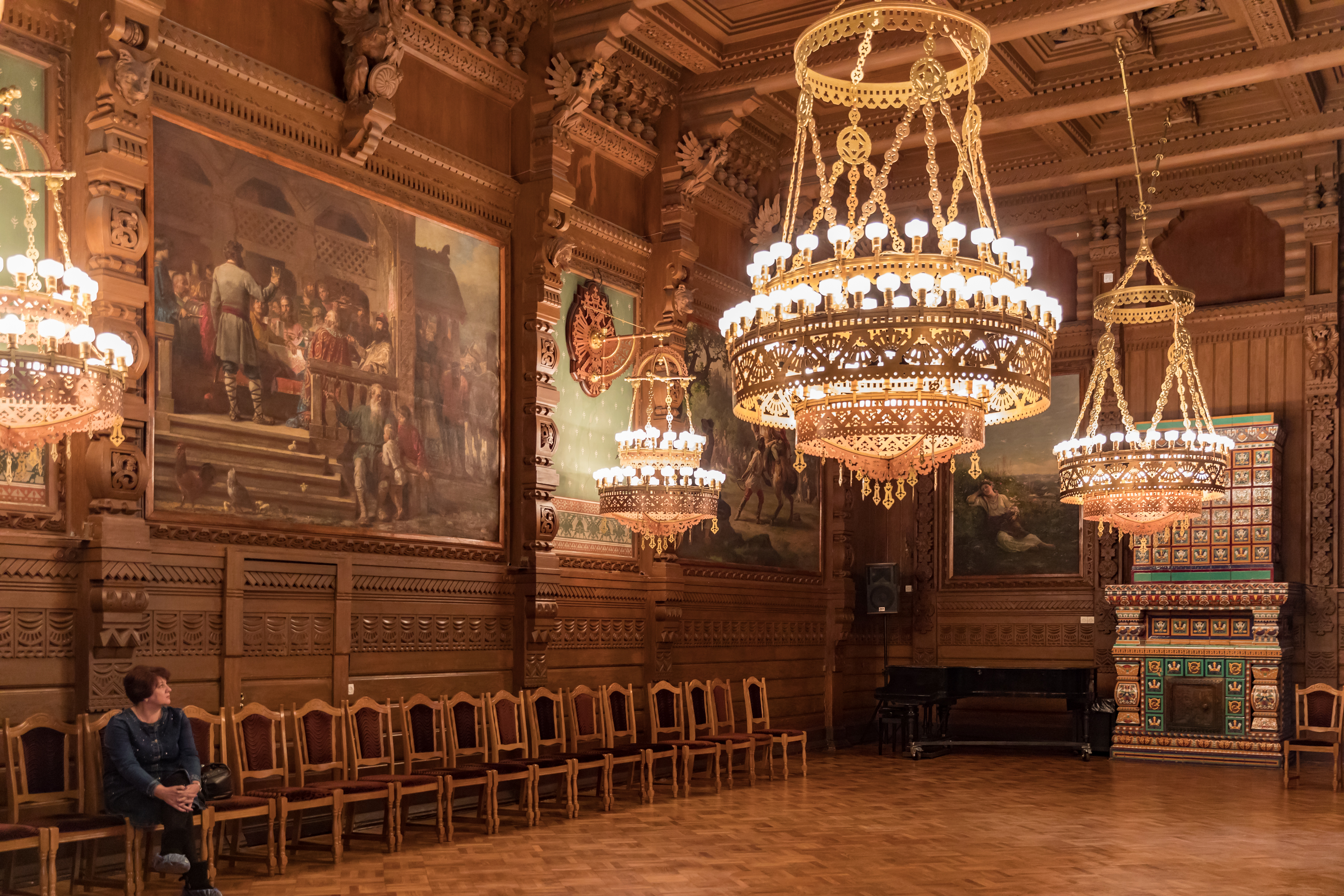

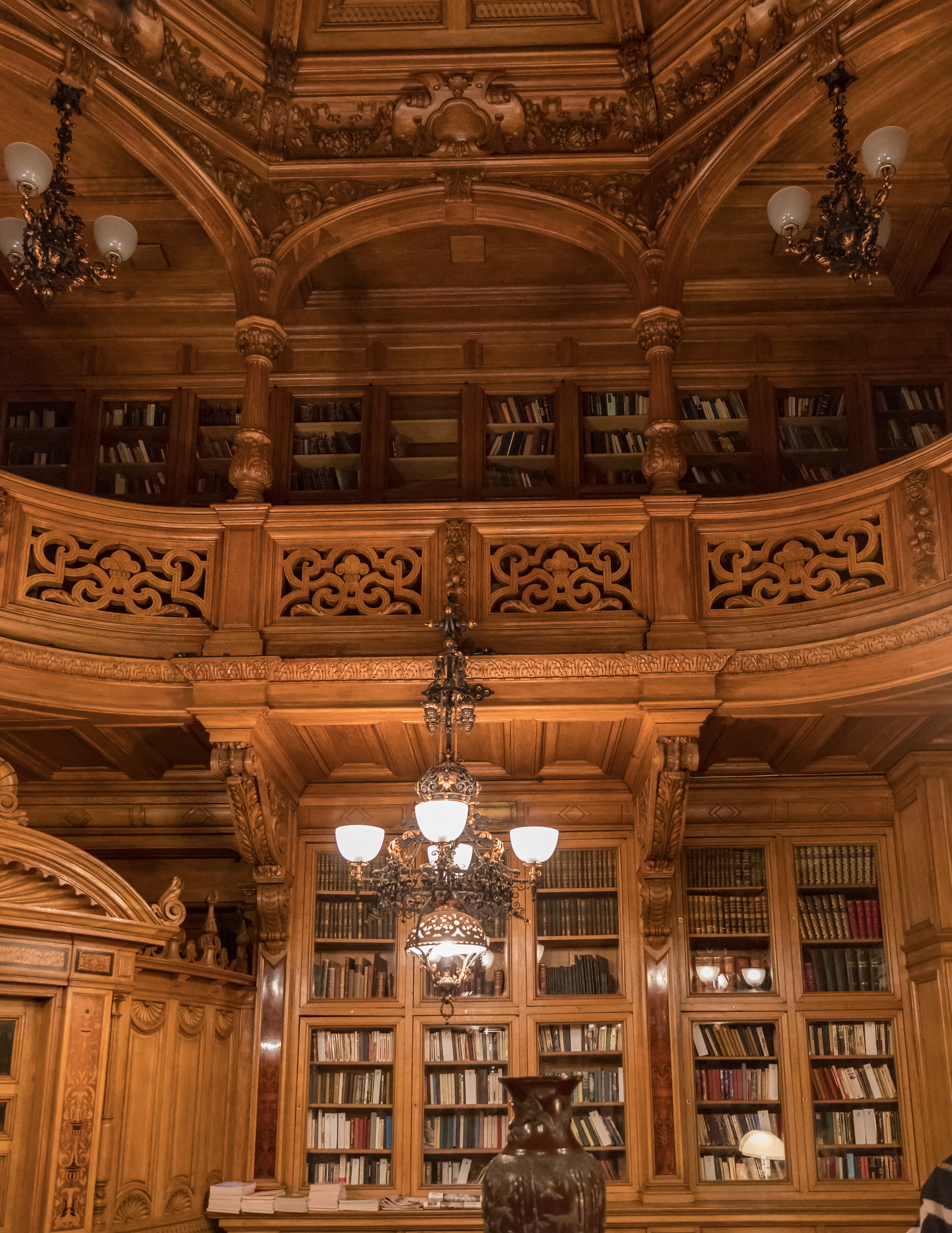

== Sources ==
- Памятники архитектуры Ленинграда. 4-е изд., перераб. Л., 1975.
- T. A. Solovyeva, Dvortsovaya Naberezhnaya, St. Petersburg, 2005 (ISBN 5901805224)
- E. S. Khmelnitskaya, Farfor v sobranii Dvortsa velikogo Vladimira Aleksandrovicha, St. Petersburg, 2006 (ISBN 5901528131)
