= Alexis Palace =

Coordinates: 59.9279°N 30.2835°E

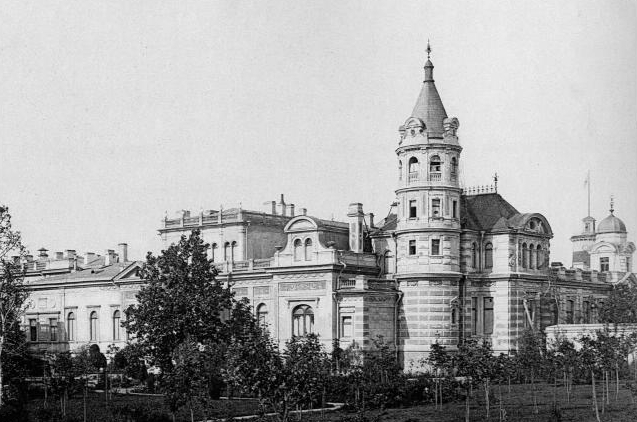
Palace of Grand Duke Alexei Alexandrovich on the Moika Embankment

Alexeevsky Palace (Алексеевский дворец) is a Revivalist palace compound on the bank of the Moika River in Saint Petersburg. It was erected in the mid-1880s as a private residence of Grand Duke Alexei and his family.

The palace's asymmetrical design with two distinctive towers and a set of exuberant rooftops is highly unusual for Saint Petersburg. Architect Maximilian Messmacher used a different style for each façade. The dining hall had a set of ten paintings by Ernst Friedrich von Liphart. The park was encircled by a wrought iron and stone fence. The central gates are still ornamented with the Grand Duke’s monogram.

In 1910 part of the gardens were sold for the construction of a candy factory. Though the palace was declared a national landmark in 1968, it remained in utter disrepair throughout the Soviet period. A major restoration was undertaken in the early 21st century at the behest of Sergei Roldugin.

In 2008 the palace was reopened as the St. Petersburg Music House, where concerts and excursions are available with the exception of July.

== Sources ==
- Малинина Т.А. Суздалева Т.Э. Дворец великого князя Алексея Александровича. СПб., 1997.
- Белякова З.И. Великие князья Алексей и Павел Александровичи: Дворцы и судьбы. СПб., 1999.
- Booklet of St. Petersburg Music House http://www.spdm.ru/doc/dvorec_2012_web.pdf
