= Stieglitz Museum of Applied Arts =

Museum in Saint Petersburg, Russia

Coordinates: 59°56′37″N 30°20′28″E

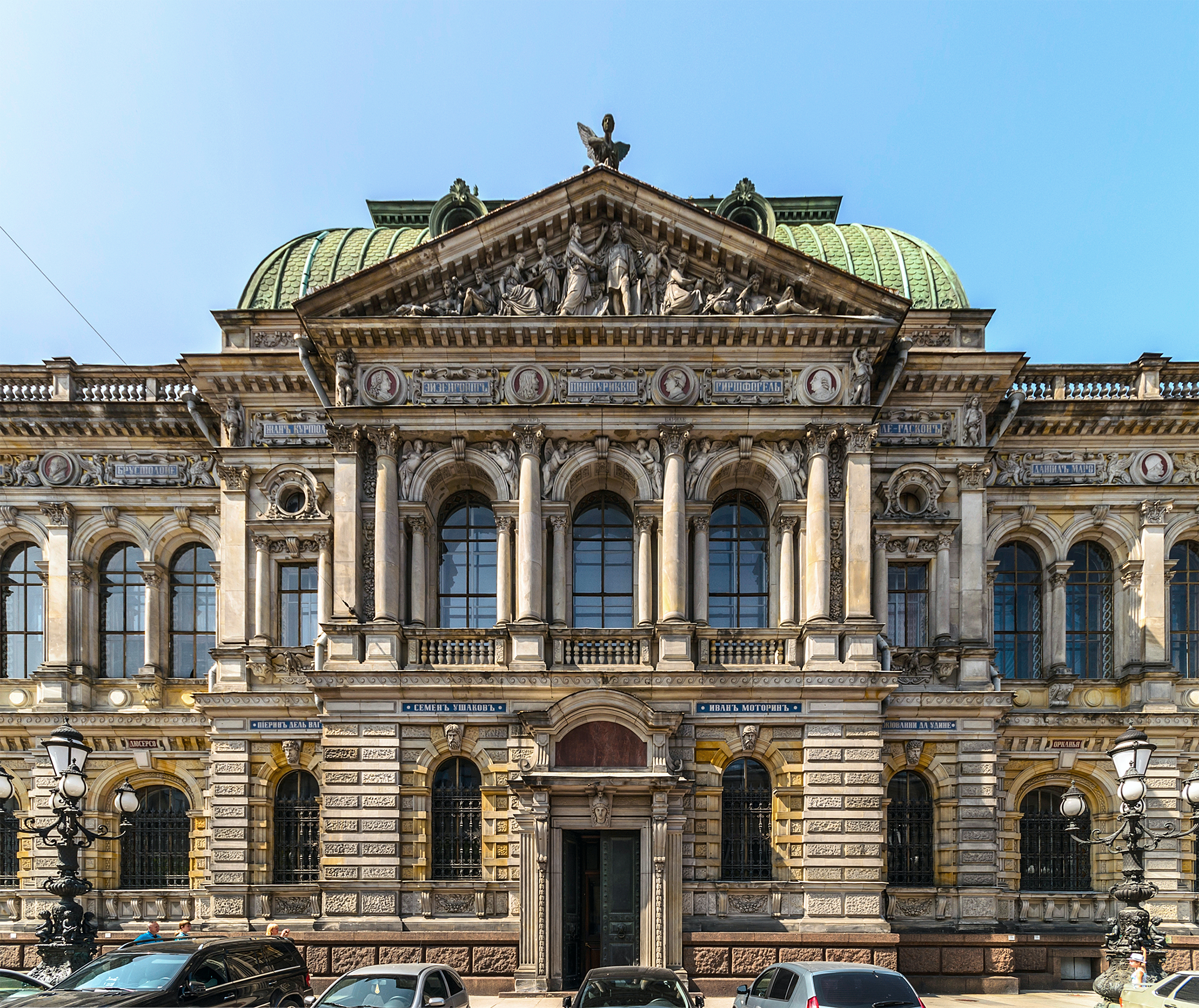
The main entrance in 2013

The Stieglitz Museum of Decorative and Applied Arts ranks among the most significant museums in Saint Petersburg, Russia.

The project had its beginnings in 1878 when Baron Alexander von Stieglitz (1814–84), a millionaire philanthropist, donated funds to build a museum for the benefit of students of the Central School of Engineering Design, which had been established by him earlier. The new museum was to accommodate Stieglitz's private collection of rare glassware, porcelains, tapestries, furniture, and tiled stoves.

The museum's first director, Maximilian Messmacher, based his design upon a similar museum in Vienna. Constructed between 1885 and 1896, the building is an example of the Neo-Renaissance at its most stylistically forceful. The ground floor with arched windows is heavily rusticated and the upper storey is turgid with ornate details and statuary. The central hall is set between two-storey Italianate arcades, while interiors of other halls are styled so as to conform with items exhibited therein. A room patterned after the Terem Palace particularly stands out as "an opulent knockout", in the words of Tom Masters of the Lonely Planet.

Out of some 30,000 items stored in the museum at the time of the Russian Revolution of 1917, the Communist authorities handed over the most precious exhibits to the Hermitage Museum. The Stieglitz Museum continued as a branch of the Hermitage until 1926, when it was abolished, only to be restored three years later as a separate institution. During the Soviet years luxurious interiors fell into disrepair, with one hall used as a gym, its walls painted over. It was not until the fall of the Soviet Union that slow and painstaking restoration began.

== Sources ==
- Музей барона Штиглица: Прошлое и настоящее. СПб., 1994.
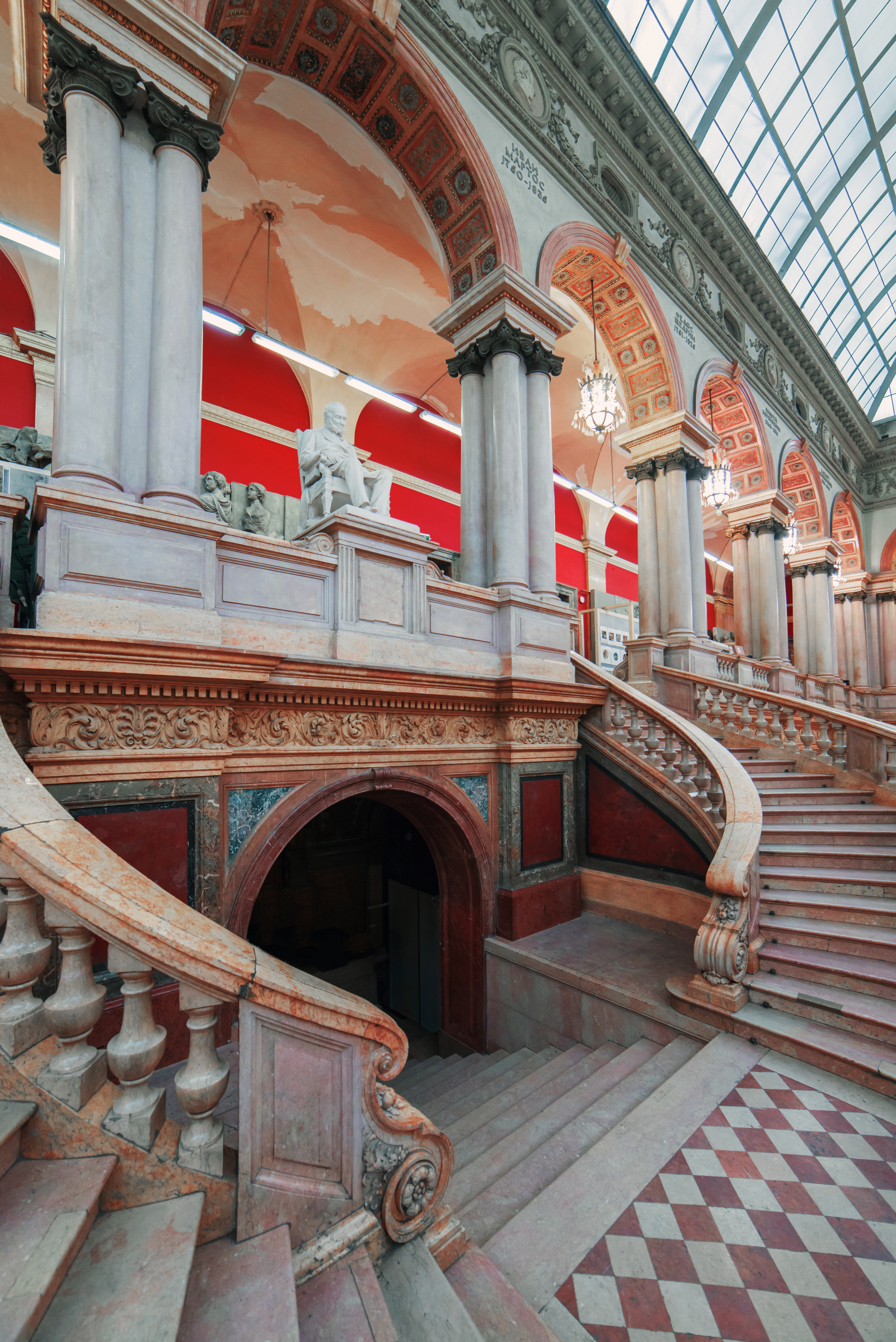

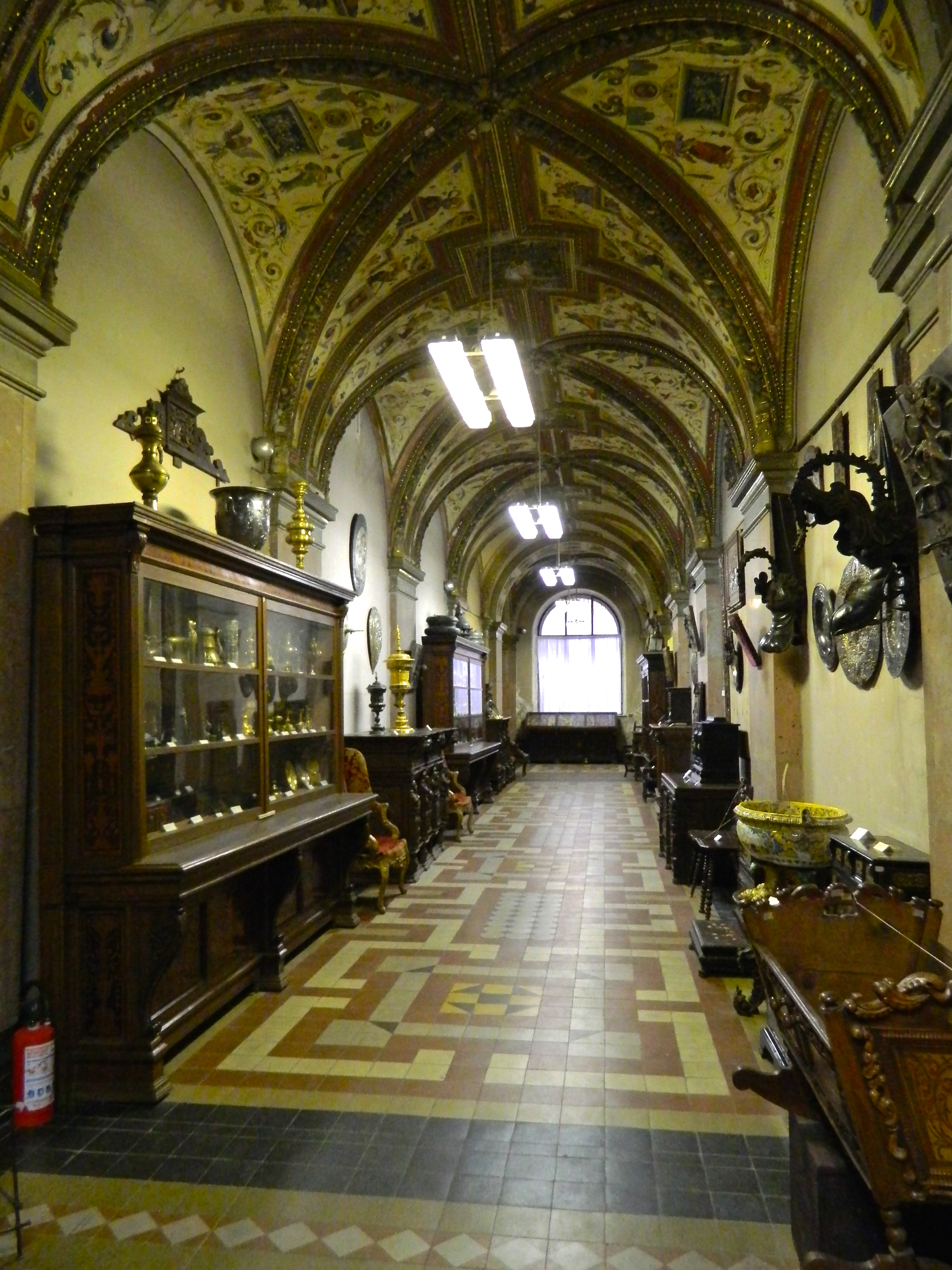

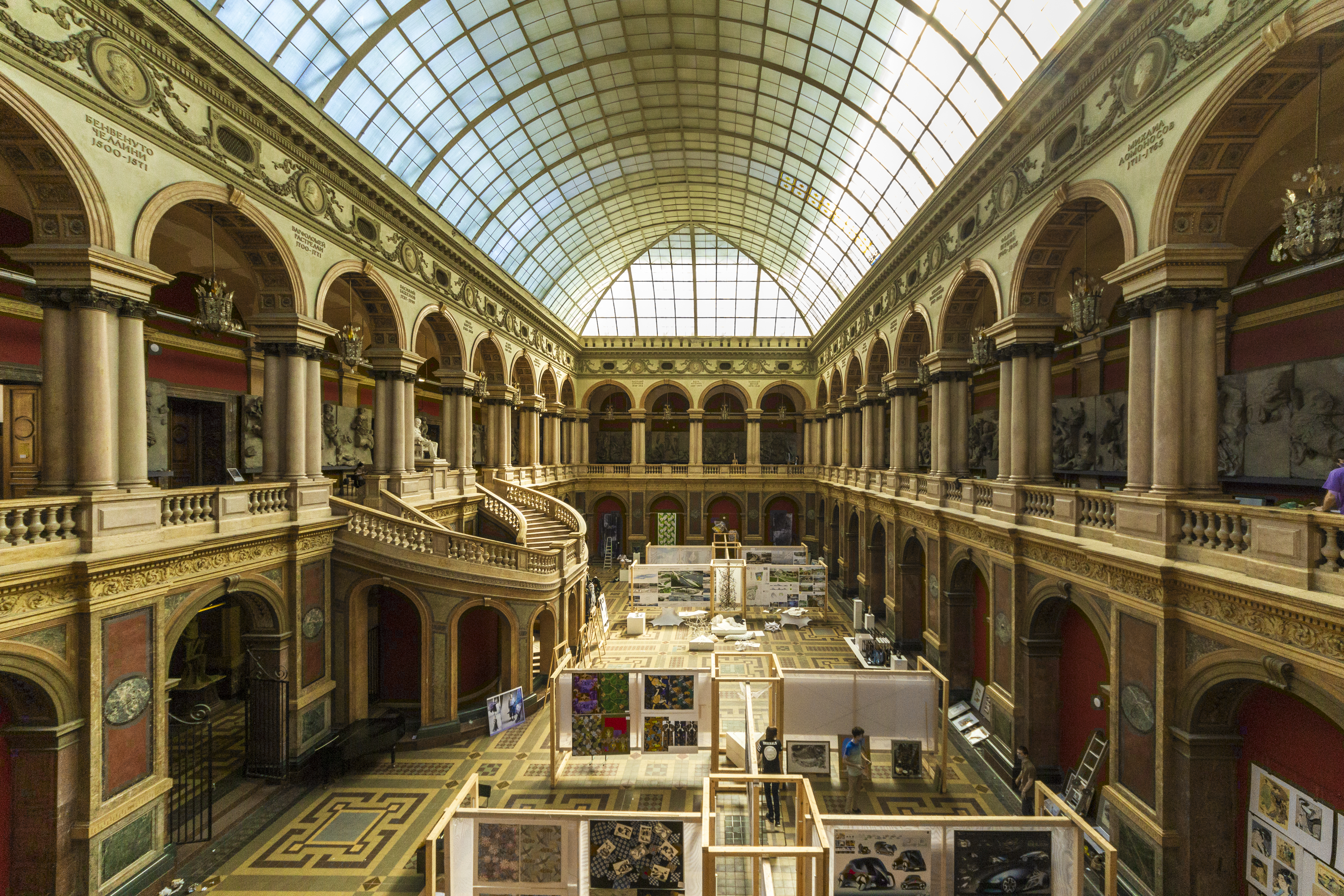

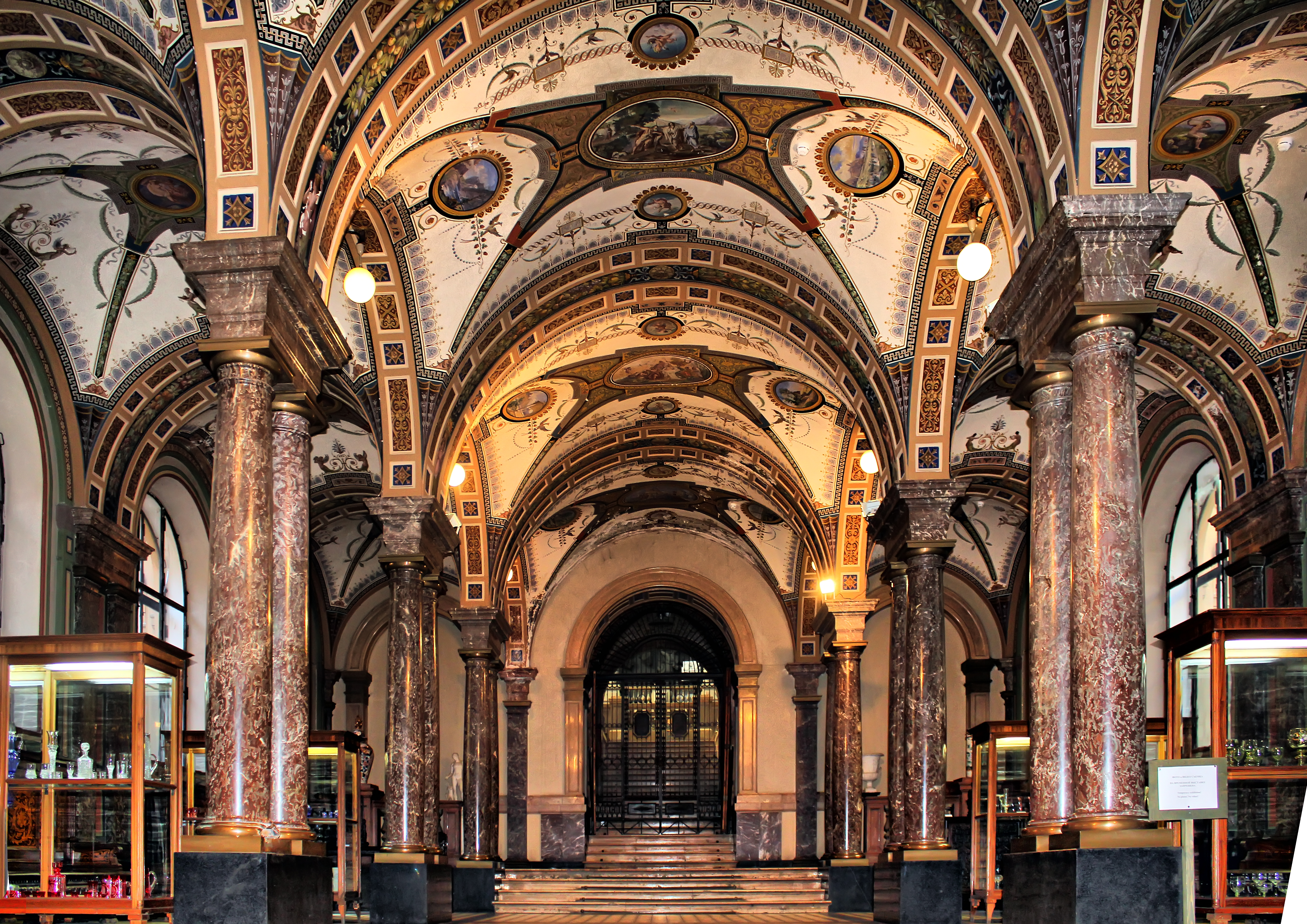

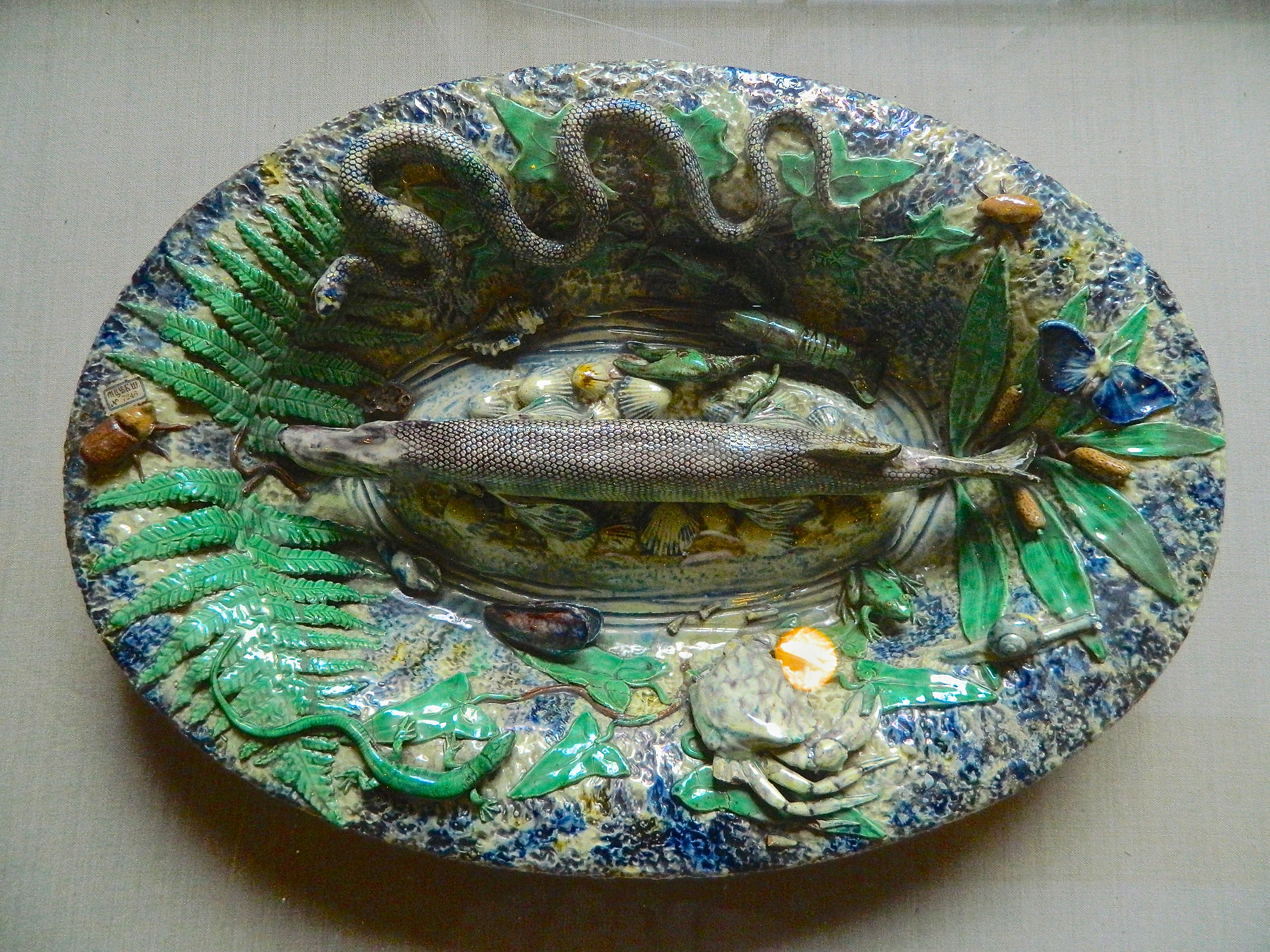
