= Aleksandrs Romans =

Latvian artist

Aleksandrs Romans (1878 – 1911) was a Latvian artist.

Aleksandrs Romans was born in the south of Latvia in a peasant family. He went to school in Jelgava and there was encouraged to pursue an artistic career by his art teacher. He pursued his art studies in Saint Petersburg under the tutelage of Vladimir Makovsky, and while in the city also came into contact with other young Latvian artists studying in the erstwhile capital of the Russian Empire. He graduated in 1904 and took up work as an art teacher, living in Saint Petersburg. He returned to Latvia in 1910 and settled in Jelgava, where he operated an art school for girls. After his early death he left behind a small but coherent corpus of works, consisting of realistic portraits and poetic landscapes.
