= Massandra Winery =

Winery in Crimea

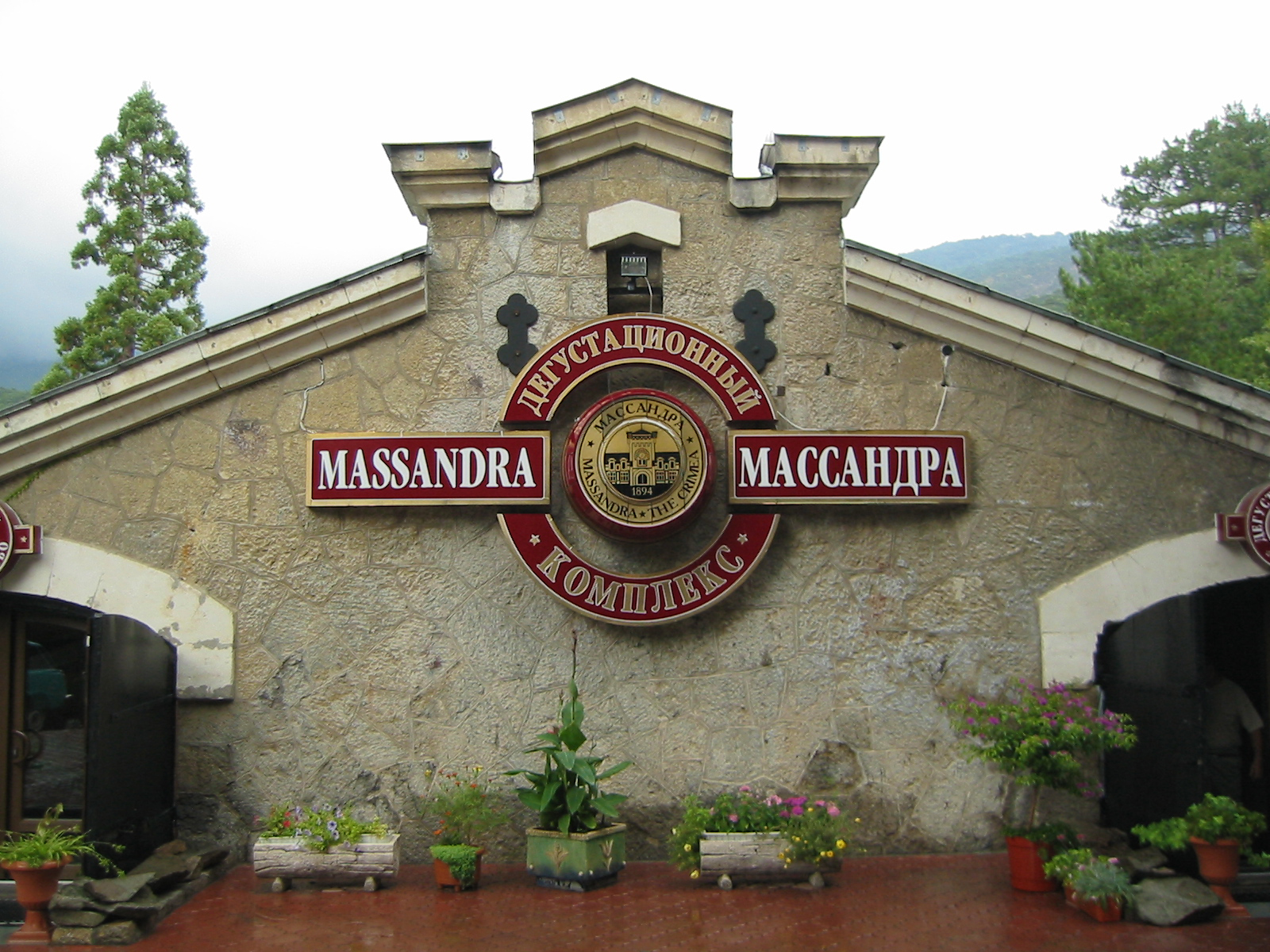
- Location: Crimea
- Coordinates: 44°31′01″N 34°11′12″E
- Founded: 1894
- Website: http://massandra.su/

The Massandra Winery is a winery in Crimea.

== History ==
The winery was founded by Knyaz Lev Golitsyn in 1894 under the aegis of Czar Nicholas II. In 1922, in the wake of the Russian Revolution, the winery was nationalized, and it was protected by a law passed in 1936 that offered state protection to its cellars. The guestbook of the winery was stolen by the German Wehrmacht during the Second World War. The winery was exempted from the uprooting of Russian vineyards that occurred in the wake of anti-alcohol laws passed by Mikhail Gorbachev in the 1980s. In the present day, the vast majority of the winery's output is exported to Russia. The ownership of the winery was illegally transferred to Russia from the Ukrainian government with the Russian annexation of Crimea in 2014. The enoteca of the winery contains about one million bottles of wine.

== Notable visitors ==
Though initially popular with the Russian aristocracy who spent their summers near Czar Nicholas, the winery has since been visited by several notable personalities including Anton Chekhov, Maxim Gorky, Ho Chi Minh, and Josip Broz Tito. Gorky wrote a tribute to Massandra that is inscribed in a metal plaque on the wall of the winery. On two occasions, wines from the Massandra Winery have been attempted to be given as gifts to Presidents of the United States. In 1987 Gorbachev requested wines from the year of Ronald Reagan's birth to give to him as Reagan was on a visit to Russia. The bottles were delivered by hand to the Kremlin, but never given to Reagan. In 1994 a bottle from the year of Bill Clinton's birth was given to an American businessman to give to him, yet no further message was heard. In 2015 the President of Russia, Vladimir Putin, visited the winery with the former Italian prime minister Silvio Berlusconi. While touring the winery, Putin and Berlusconi allegedly drank from a 1775 bottle of Jerez de la Frontera worth $90,000. The tour was conducted by the winery's pro-Russian director, Yanina Pavlenko, and charges of embezzlement were subsequently prepared against her by Ukrainian prosecutors.
