= Massandra Palace =

Palace in Crimea

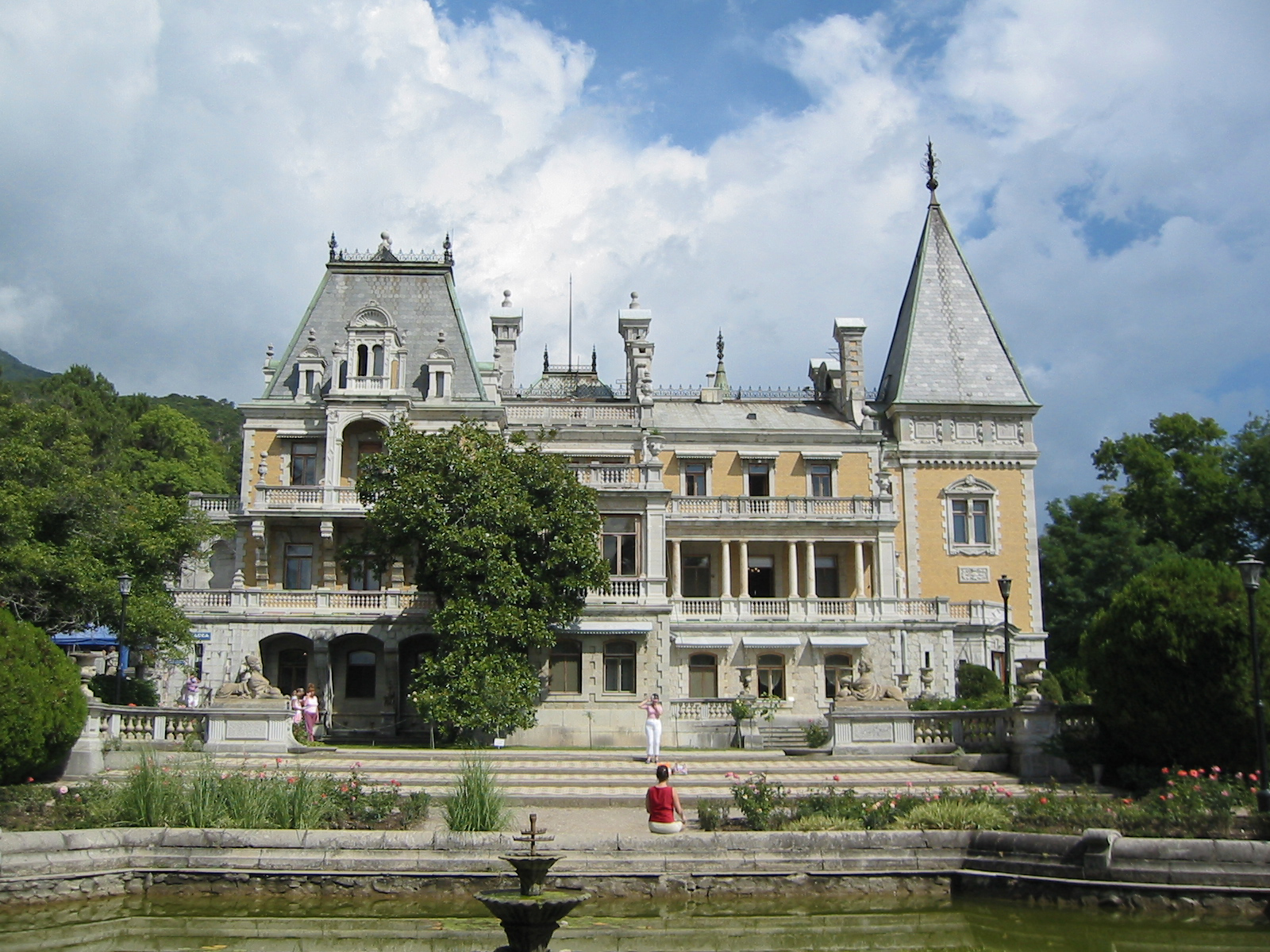
- The Massandra Palace
- Interactive map of the Massandra Palace area

General information
- Architectural style: Gothic Revival, Rococo, Neo-Romanesque, Neoclassical
- Location: Massandra, Crimea
- Coordinates: 44°25′12″N 34°03′2″E
- Construction started: 1881, 1892
- Completed: 1900
- Owner: Alexander III

Immovable Monument of National Significance of Ukraine
- Official name: Комплекс споруд палацу Олександра III (Building complex of the Palace of Alexander III)
- Type: Architecture, Monumental Art
- Reference no.: 010042-Н

The Massandra Palace is a Châteauesque villa of Emperor Alexander III of Russia in Massandra, at the south coast of Crimea.

== History ==
Construction of the building started in 1881 and was funded by the son of Mikhail Semyonovich Vorontsov, Semyon Mikhailovich, who had recently returned from the 1877-78 Russo-Turkish War. The construction of the palace that was initially designed by French architect Étienne Bouchard in the Louis XIII style was soon suspended after the death of Prince Semyon Mikhailovich Vorontsov.

In 1889 the unfinished palace was bought by the Imperial Domains Agency for Alexander III of Russia. The new owner commissioned his favorite architect Maximilian Messmacher to modernize the villa's design. Although Massandra was listed among imperial residences, no royals ever stayed there overnight (rather preferring the neighboring Livadia Palace).

After the October Revolution and before World War II, the residence was used as a government sanatorium "Proletarian Health" for people ill with tuberculosis. After World War II it was used as a state cottage (dacha) under the name "Stalinskaya".

After the fall of the Soviet Union, Massandra Palace was used as one of the Ukrainian official residences where the Massandra Accords were signed in 1993. In 2014 after the Russian annexation of Crimea, the residence was taken over by the Russian Presidential Affairs Administration. A bust of Alexander III was unveiled in front of the villa in 2017.

== Gallery ==
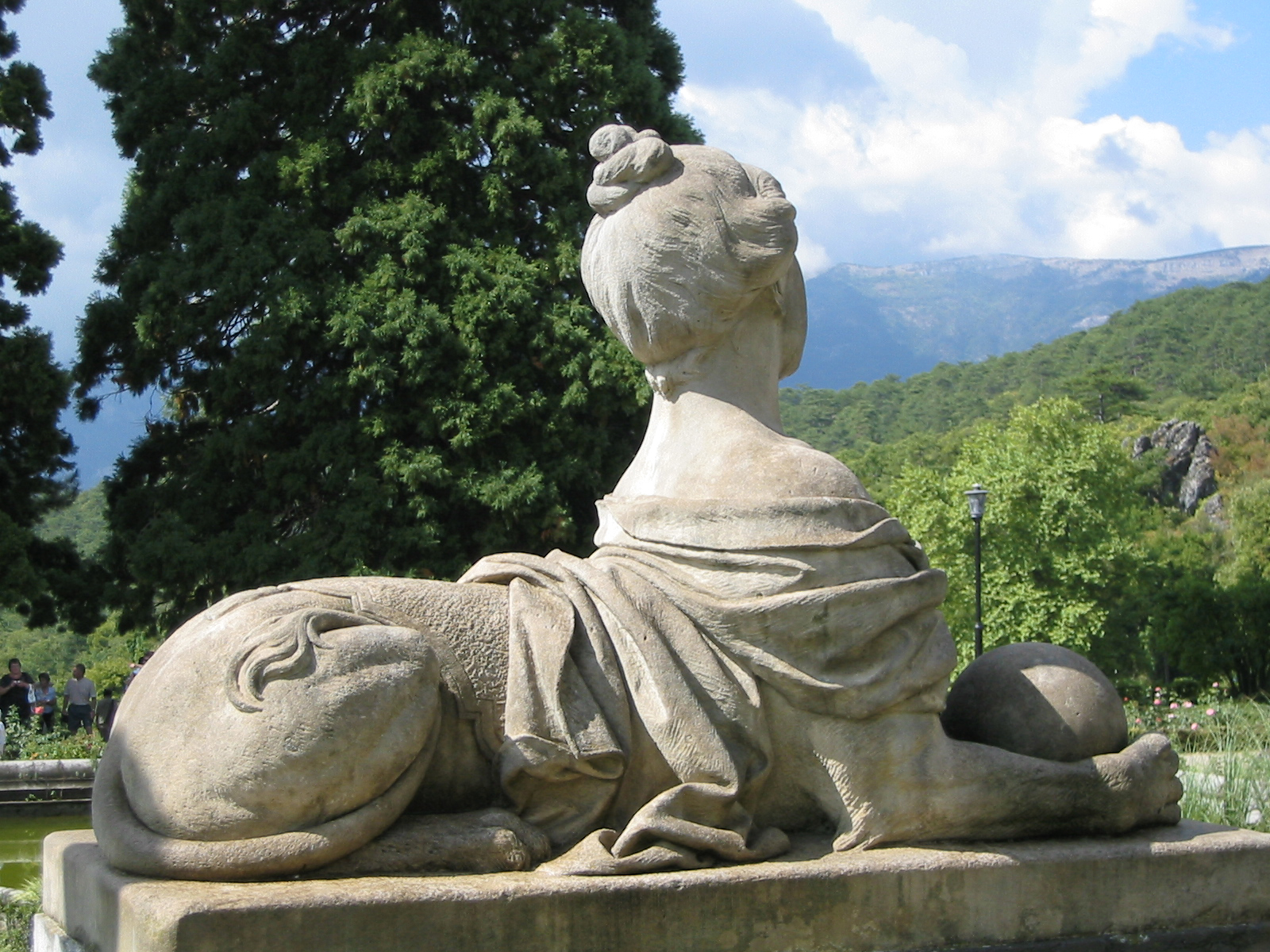
Statue

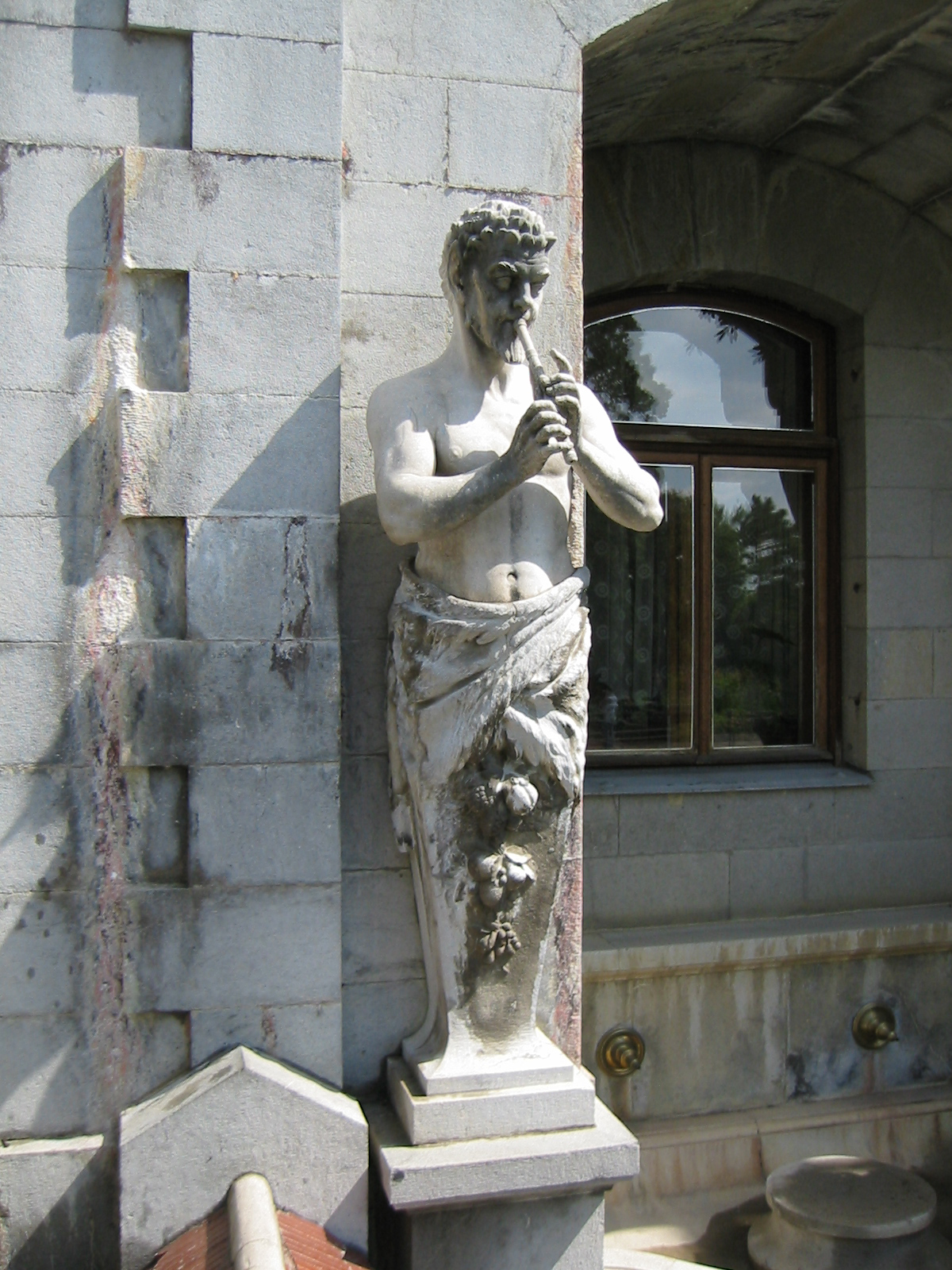
Statue

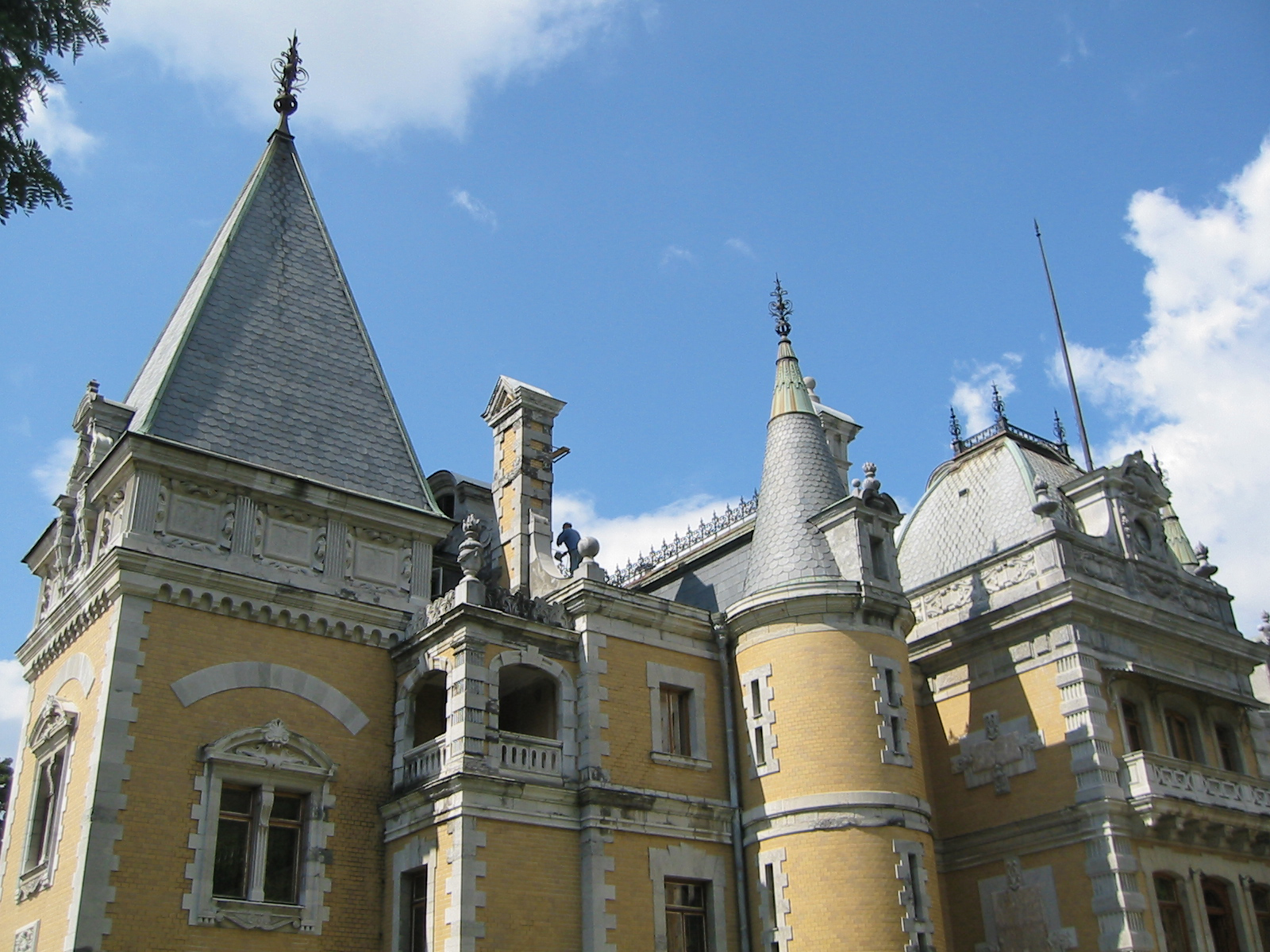
Opposite of the front-facing part

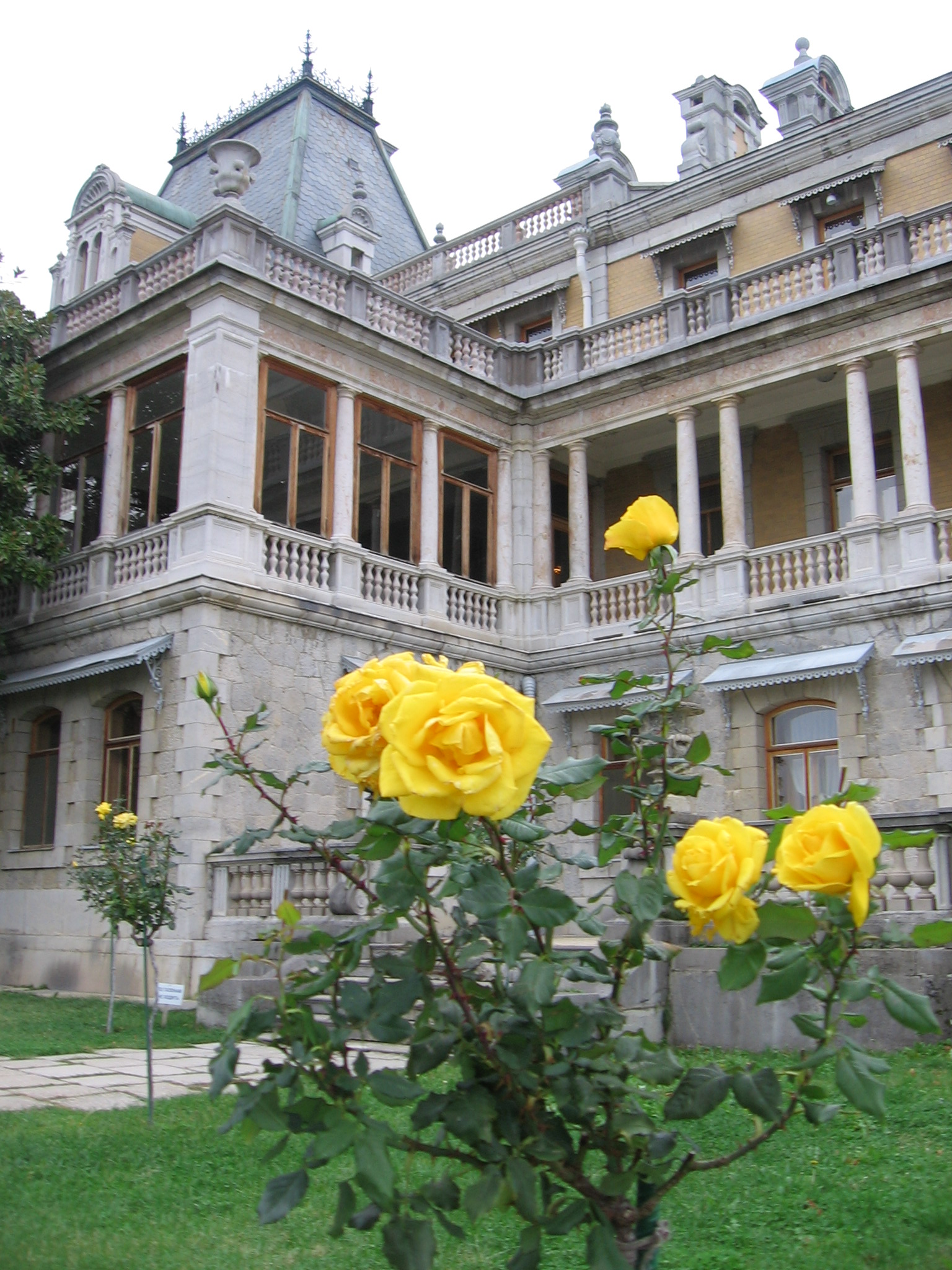
Modern look

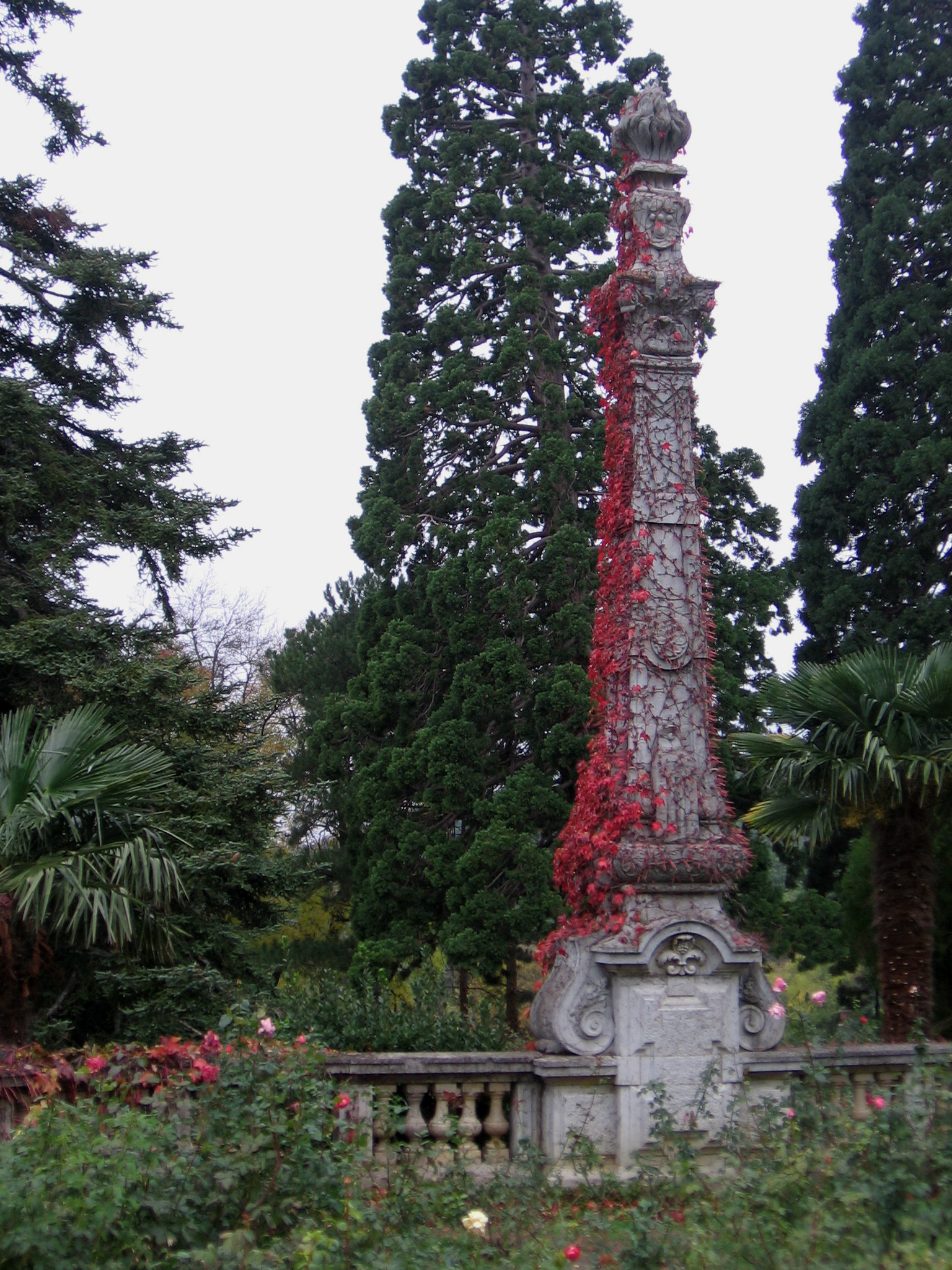
Palace Park

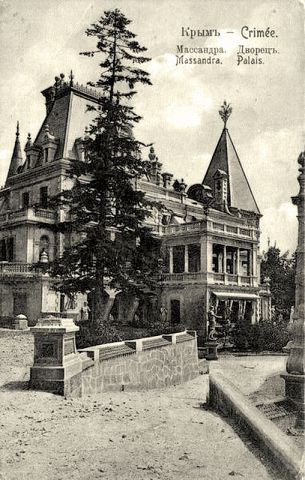
View at the end of the 19th century
