= Massandra Accords =

Massandra Accords is a set four official agreements that were signed on 3 September 1993 between Ukraine and the Russian Federation as result of negotiations that took place in Ukrainian government official residence Massandra Palace in Yalta, Ukraine. The agreements related to settlement on issues of utilization of nuclear weapons located on territory of Ukraine.

- Protocol on settlement of issues of Black Sea Fleet (signed in Moscow)
- Basic principles of utilization of nuclear weapon of Strategic Nuclear Forces located in Ukraine
- Agreement between the government of Russian Federation and the government of Ukraine on utilization of nuclear warheads
- Agreement between Ukraine and the Russian Federation on implementation of assured and authoritative supervision for operation of strategic missile systems of Strategic Forces located on their territories

== See also ==
- Lisbon Protocol (1992)
- Budapest Memorandum (1994)
