= Massandra =

Town in Yalta Municipality, Crimea

Massandra Массандра – Масандра
- Location of Masandra within the Crimea
- Coordinates: 44°31′0″N 34°11′0″E
- Republic: Crimea
- Municipality: Yalta Municipality
- Elevation: 300 m (980 ft)

Population (2014)
  - Total: 7,280
- Time zone: UTC+3 (MSK)
- Postal code: 98650, 98651
- Area code: +380-654
- Climate: Cfb

Massandra or Masandra (Crimean Tatar: Massandra; Russian: Массандра; Ukrainian: Масандра) is an urban-type settlement in the Yalta Municipality in Crimea.

Occupying the spot of an ancient Greek settlement (Tavrida-Ταυρίδα), Masandra was acquired by Counts Potocki in 1783.

In the mid-19th century, it passed to Prince Vorontsov Jr, whose father was the governor of New Russia. Enraptured by a picturesque setting, Vorontsov in 1881 engaged a team of French architects to design for him a château in the Louis XIII style. He died the following year and construction work was suspended until 1889, when the messuage was purchased by Alexander III of Russia. The tsar asked architect Maximilian Messmacher to finish the palace for his own use but he did not live to see it completed in 1900. During the Soviet years, the palace was employed by Joseph Stalin as his dacha.

Today, Masandra is known for its viniculture and production of dessert and fortified wines. The Massandra Winery was founded by Prince Lev Golitsyn in 1894. The enoteca of the winery contains about one million bottles of wine.

A minor planet, 3298 Massandra, discovered in 1979 by N. Chernykh at Nauchnyj, is named after the settlement.

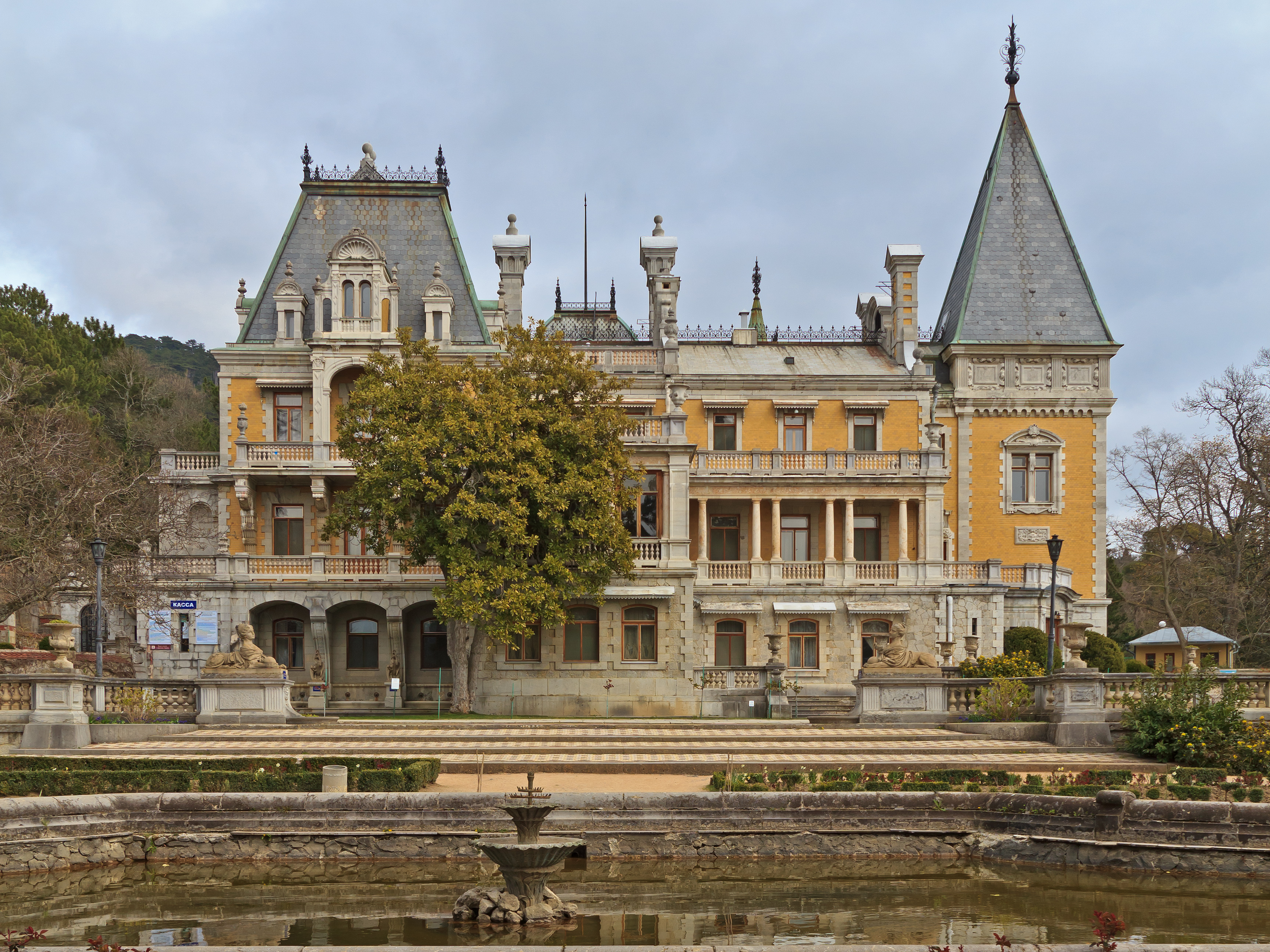
Massandra Palace

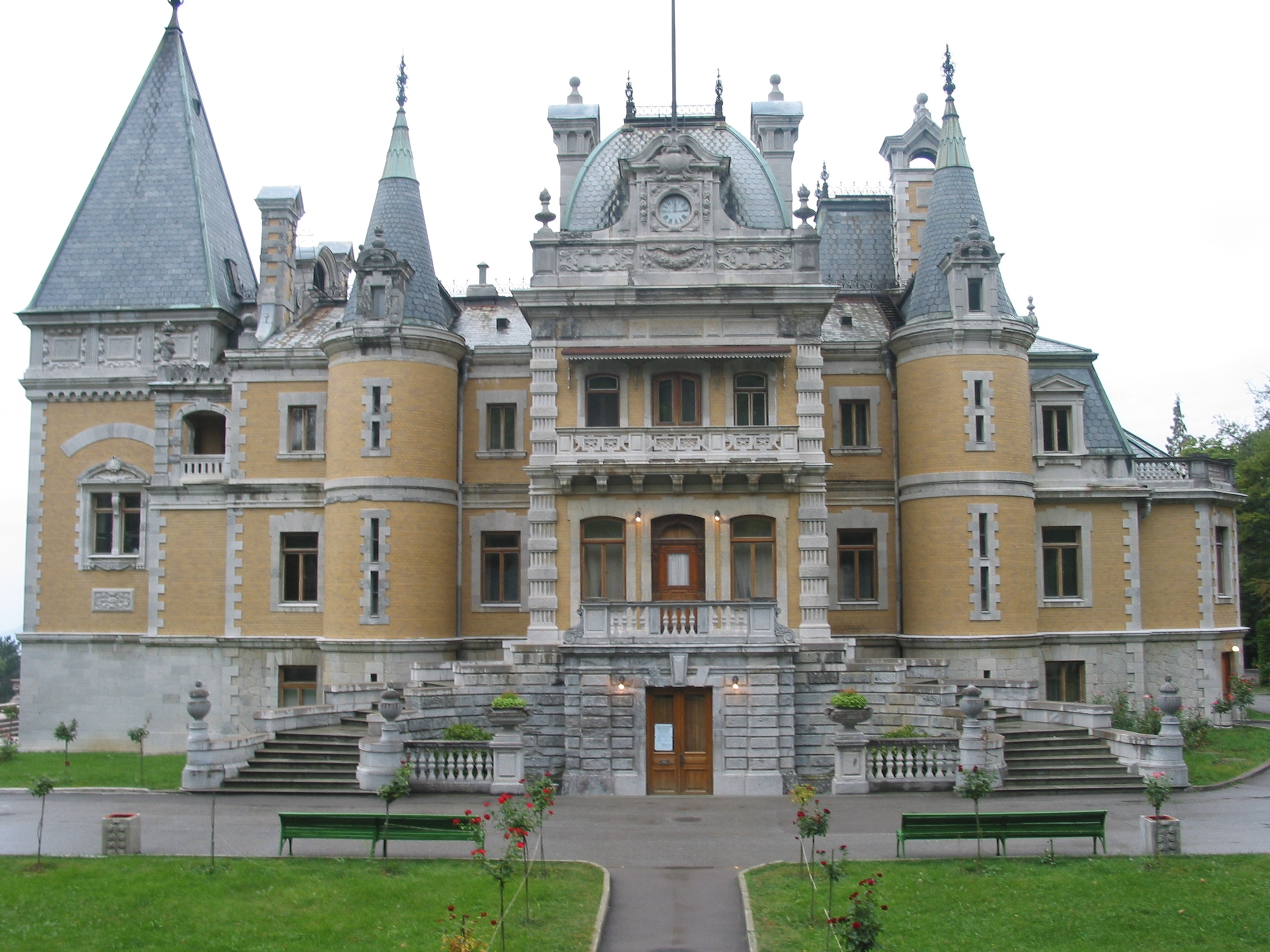
Another side of the palace

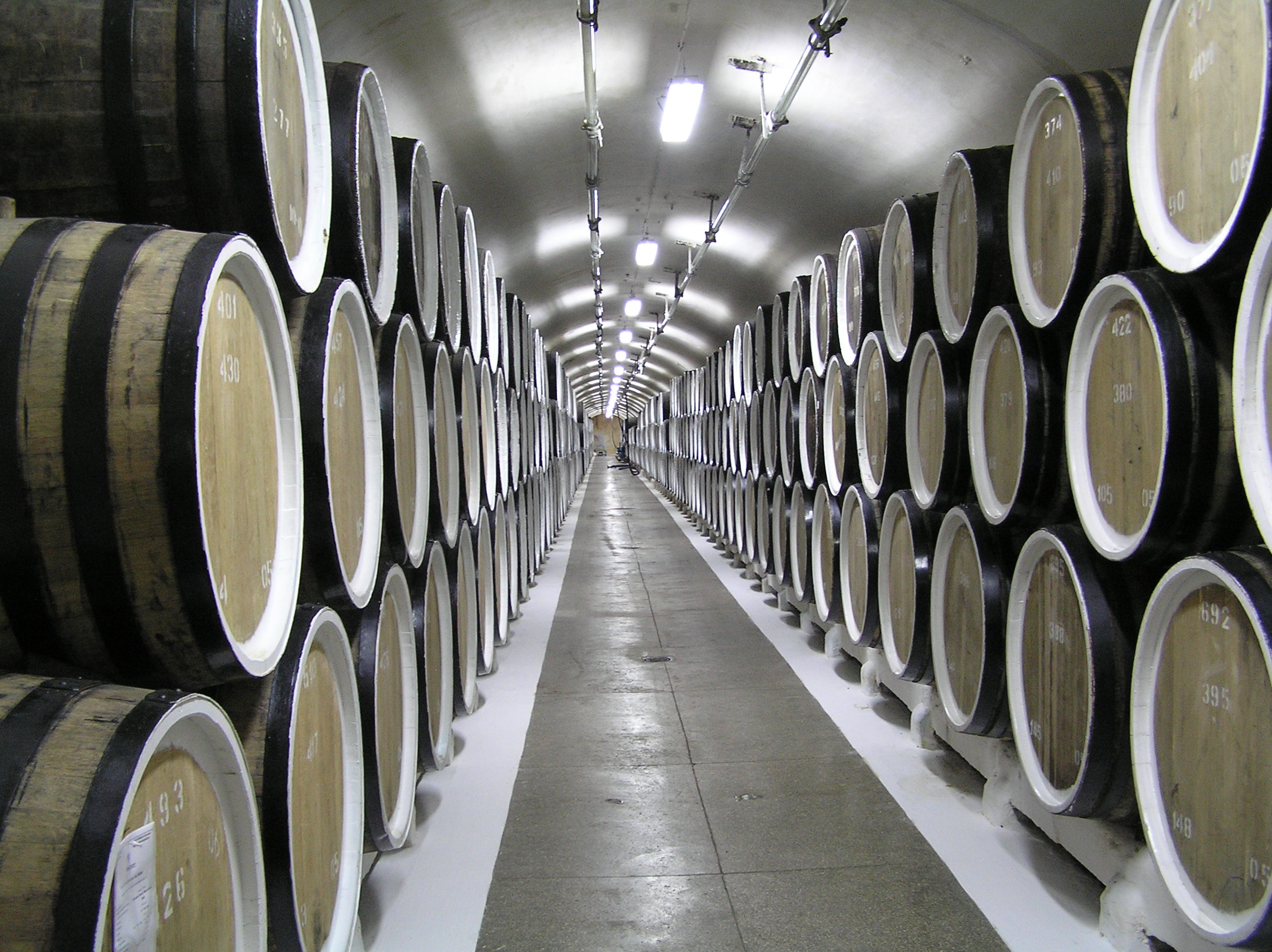
Main cellar of Massandra Winery

== See also ==
- Euxinograd near Varna, the site of a similar seaside château, commissioned by Ferdinand I of Bulgaria
