= Saint Petersburg Stieglitz State Academy of Art and Design =

Design school in Saint Petersburg, Russia

Coordinates: 59.9433°N 30.3408°E

- Санкт-Петербургская государственная художественно-промышленная академия имени А. Л. Штиглица
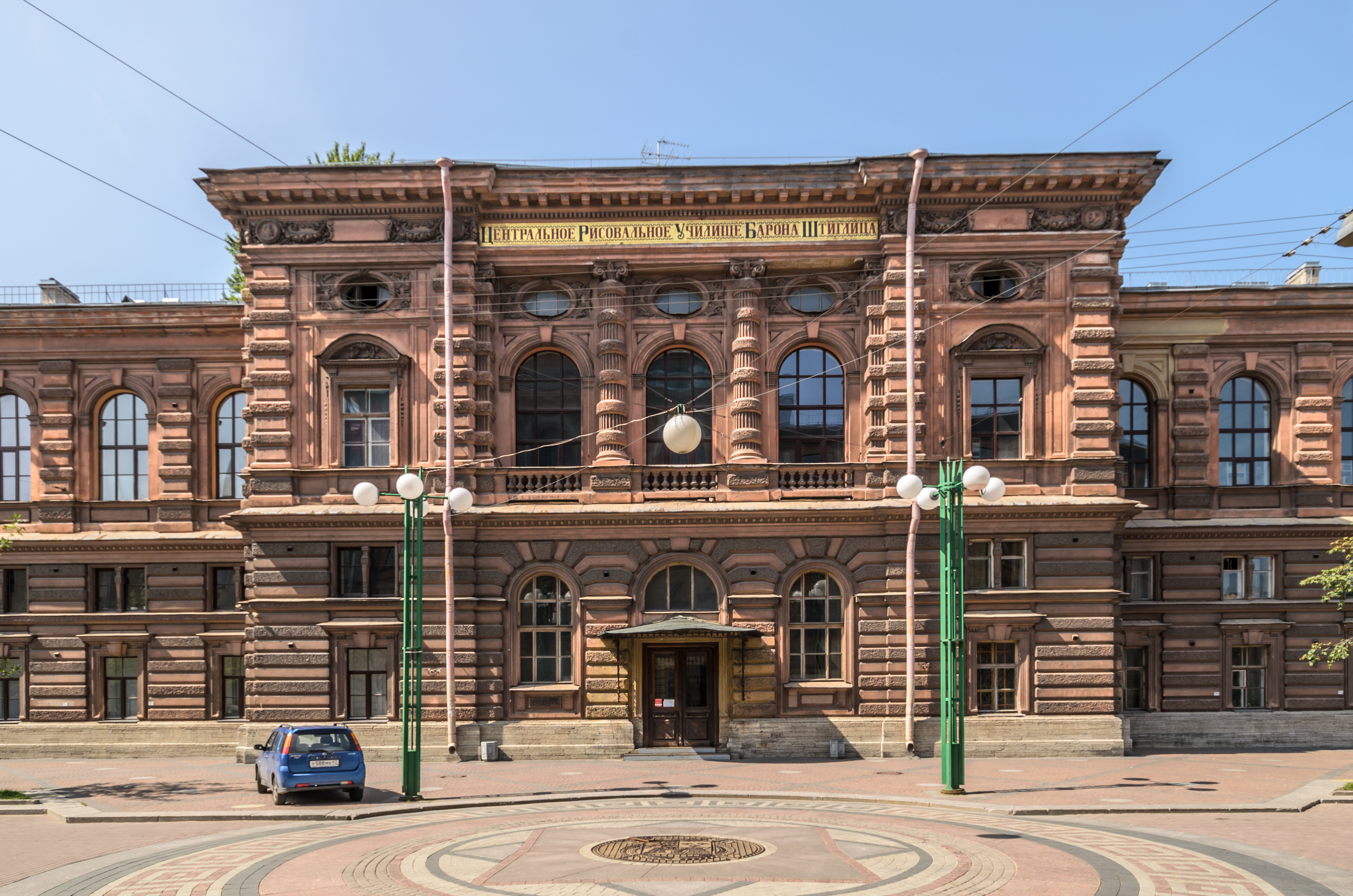
- Former names: School of Technical Drawing of Baron Alexander von Stieglitz; Leningrad Higher School of Art and Industry
- Established: 1876
- Rector: Vasily Kichedzhi
- Academic staff: 200
- Students: 1 500
- Location: Saint Petersburg, Russia
- Website: www.ghpa.ru/international

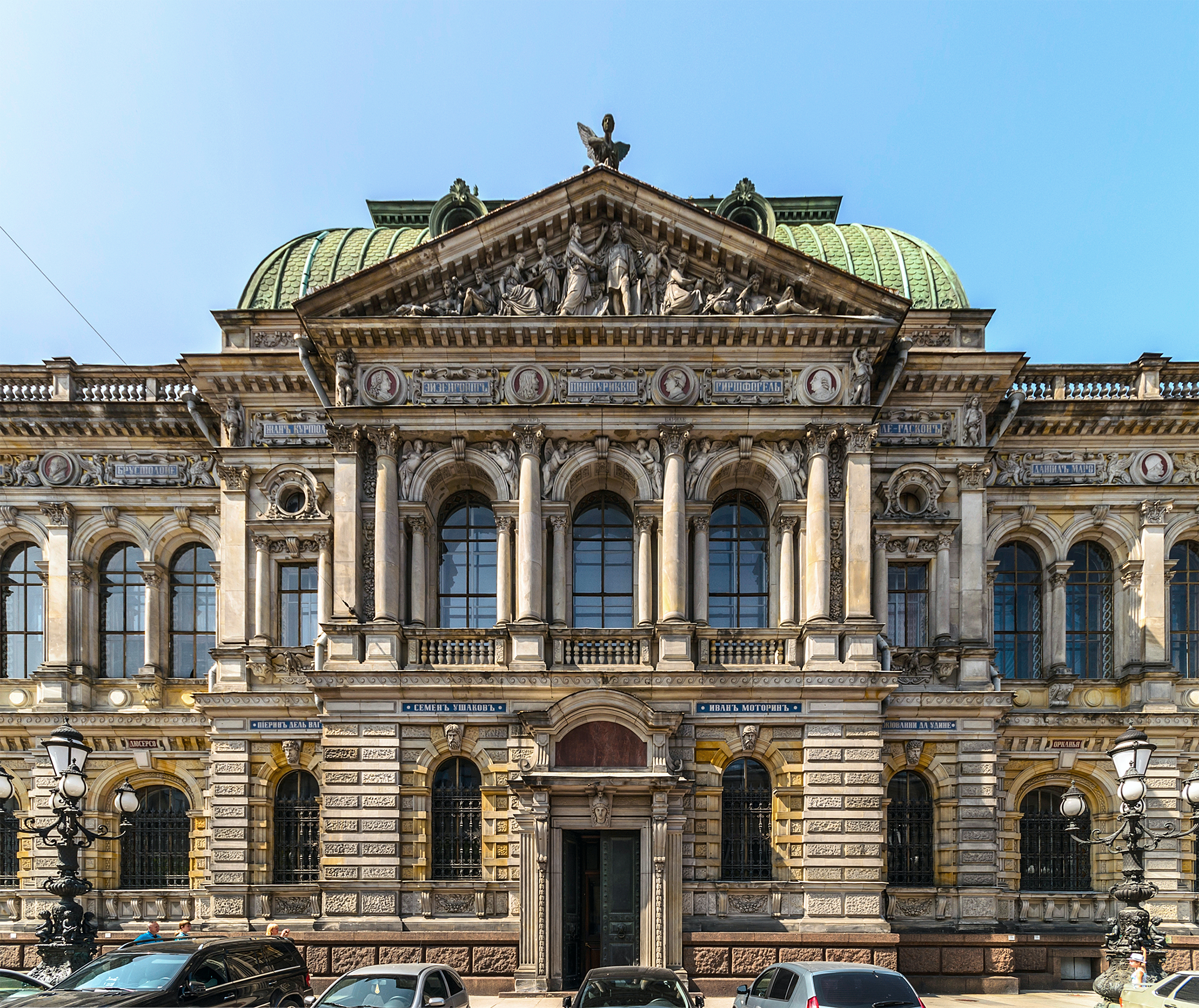
The Stieglitz Museum

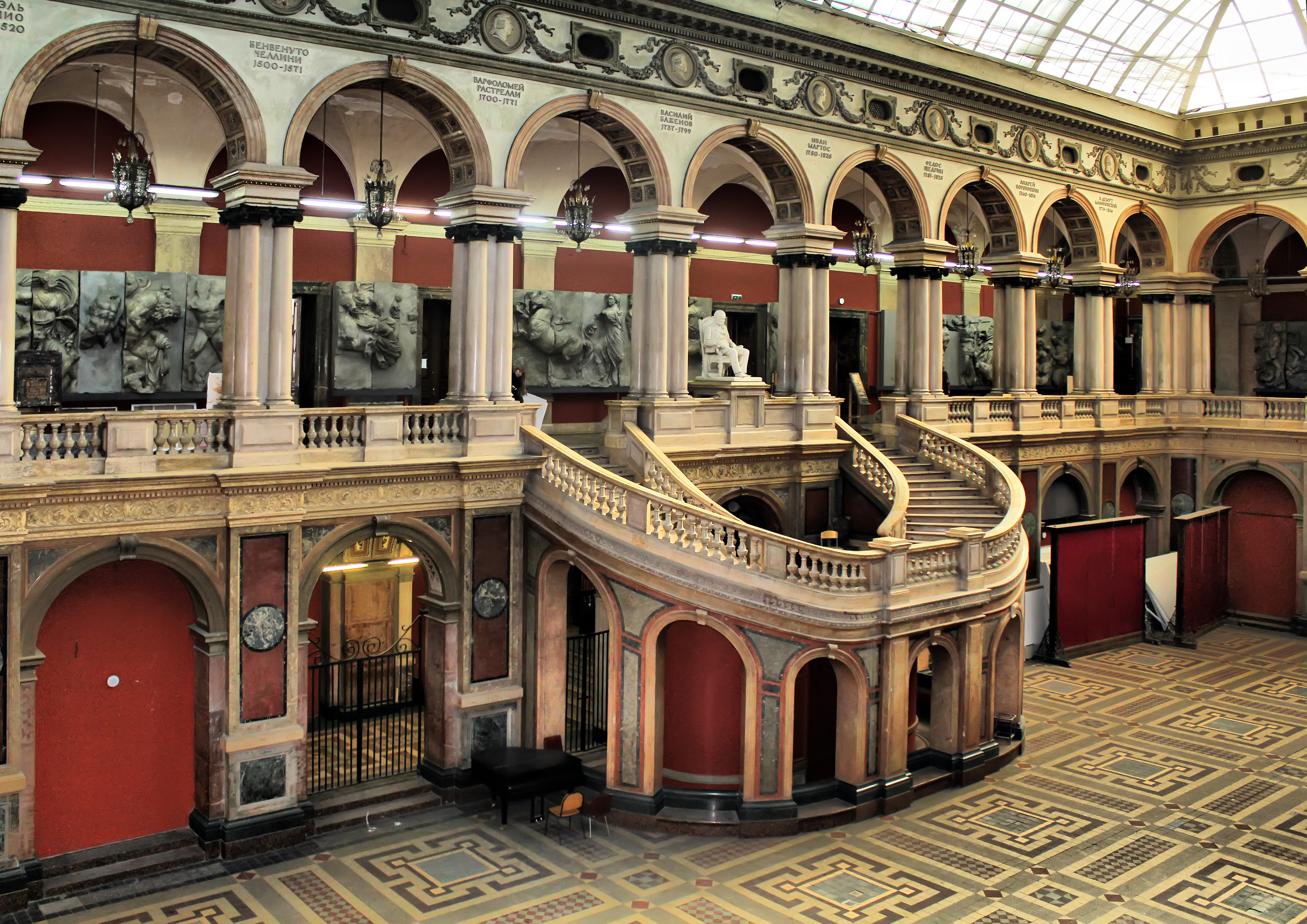
The exhibition hall

The Saint Petersburg Stieglitz State Academy of Art and Design (Russian: Санкт-Петербургская художественно-промышленная академия имени А. Л. Штиглица; abbreviated as СПГХПА) is the oldest school of design in Russia. It occupies a parcel of land immediately to the east of the Summer Garden in Saint Petersburg.

== History ==
It was set up in Saint Petersburg in 1876 by Baron Alexander von Stieglitz (1814–84), a millionaire philanthropist, as the School of Technical Drawing. The Stieglitz Museum of Applied Arts was founded in 1878 for the benefit of its students. The school building was designed by Maximilian Messmacher (the school's director, until 1896). By the end of the century, the Central School had branches in Yaroslavl, Saratov, and Narva.

In 1945, by decision of the Soviet Government School of Technical Drawing, it was re-established as the College of Art and Design which provides training in the monumental, decorative and industrial arts. In 1948 it became the Leningrad Higher School of Art and Industry. It was renamed the Leningrad Vera Mukhina Higher School of Art and Design in 1953 (after Vera Mukhina, the monumentalist author of Worker and Kolkhoz Woman, whose name was a symbol of Soviet art).

As Mukhina was not personally linked to the school, the educational establishment (informally known as Mukha) was renamed after its founder in 1994.

== Today ==
Today the Academy has 1,500 plus students and 200 professors and teachers and instructors.

The Academy has two faculties: the Faculty of Design, and the Faculty of Monumental and Decorative Art.

The faculty of Design comprises the following departments:

- Fashion (Costume) Design
- Industrial Design
- Furniture Design
- Environmental Design
- Graphic Design
- Design of Interior and Equipment

The faculty of Monumental and Decorative Art comprises the following departments:

- Monumental and Decorative Sculpture
- Monumental and Decorative Painting
- Artistic Textiles
- Painting and Restoration
- Artistic Metal
- Glass and Ceramics
- Theory and History of Art
- Book Binding

In 2016 the Centre for Innovative Education Projects has been established as an integral part of the academy. Its main goal is to teach experts for creative industries.

== Alumni ==
- Victoria Barbă
- Yuri Bosco
