= Roman Schmidt =

Roman Schmidt may refer to:

- Roman Schmidt (pilot) (1893–1959), Croatian aviator
- Roman Schmidt (politician), Ukrainian zoologist and politician
