= Roman Schmidt (politician) =

Ukrainian zoologist and politician

- Роман Шмідт
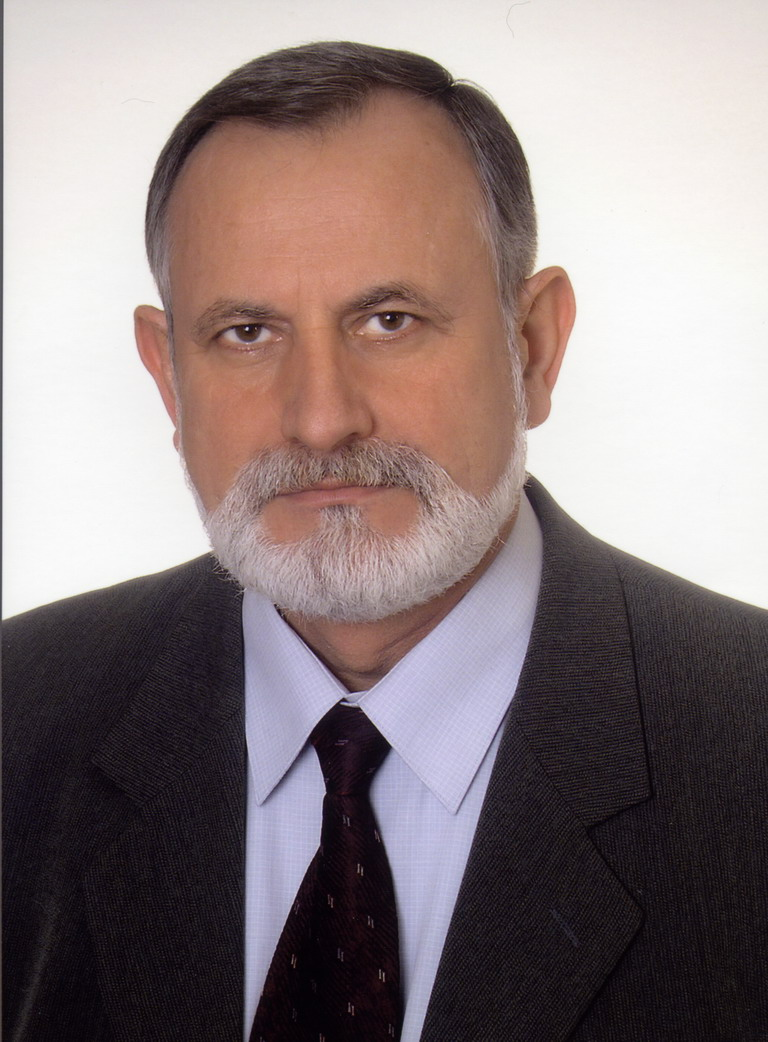
- Schmidt in 2008

Deputy Minister of Agrarian Policy and Food
- In office 30 January 2008 – ?
- Prime Minister: Yulia Tymoshenko
- Minister: Yuriy Melnyk
- In office February 2000 – 2003
- Prime Minister: Viktor Yushchenko; Anatoliy Kinakh
- Minister: Ivan Kyrylenko; Serhiy Ryzhuk

People's Deputy of Ukraine
- In office 12 May 1998 – 16 February 2000
- Preceded by: Constituency established
- Succeeded by: Taras Chornovil
- Constituency: Lviv Oblast, No. 115

Personal details
- Born: 20 April 1951 (age 75) Staryi Myliatyn, Ukrainian SSR, Soviet Union (now Ukraine)
- Party: People's Movement of Ukraine
- Other political affiliations: NUNS
- Education: Lviv Veterinary Institute

Military service
- Allegiance: Soviet Union
- Branch/service: Soviet Army
- Years of service: 1975–1978

Roman Mykhailovych Schmidt (Note: Also Shmidt.) (Ukrainian: Роман Михайлович Шмідт; born 20 April 1951) is a Ukrainian zoologist and politician who served as Deputy Minister of Agrarian Policy and Food of Ukraine from February 2000 to 2003 and from January 2008 to an unknown date. He previously served as a People's Deputy of Ukraine from Ukraine's 115th electoral district from 1998 to February 2000, when he resigned and was succeeded by Taras Chornovil. He is a member of the People's Movement of Ukraine.

== Biography ==
Roman Mykhailovych Schmidt was born on 20 April 1951 in the village of Staryi Myliatyn, in Ukraine's western Lviv Oblast. At the time, the region was part of the Soviet Union. He studied at the Lviv Veterinary Institute from 1968 to 1971 before serving in the Soviet Army from 1975 to 1978, and achieved his doctorate in 1981 after completing his thesis, titled "Protein-Nuclein Exchange in the Rumen Mucosa of Calves when Fed Urea". He is an accomplished zoologist, having authored more than 200 scientific works. Since 1999, he has been a full member of the National Academy of Sciences of Ukraine.

=== Political career ===
Schmidt was elected to the Verkhovna Rada (Ukrainian parliament) in 1998 as a member of the People's Movement of Ukraine from Ukraine's 115th electoral district, located in Lviv Oblast. He was a member of the Verkhovna Rada Committees on Agricultural Policy and Privatisation. Schmidt resigned from the Verkhovna Rada on 16 February 2000 to become Deputy Minister of Agrarian Policy and Food, and was succeeded by Taras Chornovil.

As Deputy Minister of Agrarian Policy and Food, Schmidt helped oversee the decollectivisation of the Ukrainian farming industry, an event termed the "second Ukrainian agricultural revolution this century" by Kyiv Post. He also cooperated with members of the International Monetary Fund and World Bank on regulation of the Ukrainian grain industry.

Following poor harvests in summer 2003, Schmidt, along with other supporters of Viktor Yushchenko, were fired by President Leonid Kuchma and placed on trial for corruption in charges regarded by Radio Free Europe/Radio Liberty correspondent Roman Kupchinsky as having been on shaky grounds, designed to target supporters of the opposition. Schmidt returned to his role under Prime Minister Yulia Tymoshenko, being appointed on 30 January 2008. Schmidt was active in efforts to economically support agriculture in Ukraine, which was devastated by the dissolution of the Soviet Union. He encouraged economic diversification by small landowners, and sought support from Canada in improving the Ukrainian agricultural economy.

Schmidt was an unsuccessful candidate in the 2002 and 2006 Ukrainian parliamentary elections, both times as a member of the party list of the Our Ukraine Bloc. He is a supporter of agrarianism and agricultural cooperatives.
