= Taras Chornovil =

Ukrainian politician

- Тарас Чорновіл
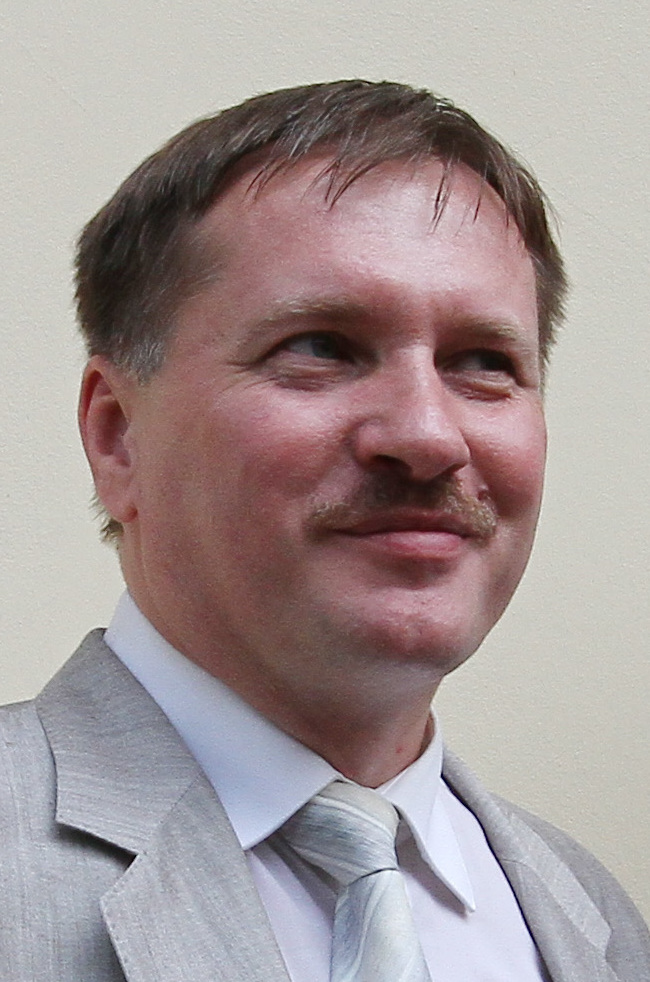
- Chornovil in 2011

People's Deputy of Ukraine
- In office 5 July 2000 – 15 December 2012
- Preceded by: Roman Schmidt (2000); Mykhailo Kosiv (2002)
- Succeeded by: Constituency abolished
- Constituency: Lviv Oblast, No. 115 (2000–2002); Lviv Oblast, No. 116 (2002–2006); Party of Regions, No. 4 (2006–2007); Party of Regions, No. 3 (2007–2012)

Personal details
- Born: 1 June 1964 (age 62) Lviv, Ukrainian SSR, Soviet Union (now Ukraine)
- Party: Independent
- Other political affiliations: People's Movement of Ukraine; Reforms and Order Party; Our Ukraine Bloc; Party of Regions
- Relations: Viacheslav Chornovil (father); Olena Antoniv (mother); Andriy Chornovil (brother)
- Website: chornovil.openua.net (archived)

Military service
- Allegiance: Soviet Union
- Branch/service: Soviet Army
- Years of service: 1982–1984

Taras Viacheslavovych Chornovil (Ukrainian: Тарас В'ячеславович Чорновіл; born on 1 June 1964) is a Ukrainian politician who served as a People's Deputy of Ukraine from 2000 to 2012. The son of Ukrainian Soviet dissident leader Viacheslav Chornovil, Chornovil was first elected to the Verkhovna Rada as a member of the People's Movement of Ukraine before joining the Party of Regions during the Orange Revolution, later becoming an independent in 2008.

== Early life and career ==
Taras Chornovil was born on 1 June 1964 in Lviv, Ukrainian SSR, Soviet Union (now Ukraine), to Viacheslav Chornovil, a Soviet dissident, politician, and founder of the People's Movement of Ukraine, and his wife, Olena Antoniv.

Chornovil studied at the Faculty of Biology at the Lviv University. From 1981 to 1982, he was a laboratory assistant at Lviv Polytechnic Institute. From 1982 to 1984, Chornovil served in the Soviet Army. From 1985, he was a member of the Ukrainian Helsinki Group, and one of the founders of the Union of Independent Ukrainian Youth. From 1987, he was an editor in the "Ukrayinskyi Vistnyk" and the main editor of the "Moloda Ukrayina" newspapers.

=== Political career ===
From 1990 to 1994, Chornovil was a deputy of the Lviv Oblast Council. From 1995 he was the main editor of the Chas newspaper. In 2000 and 2002, Chornovil was elected as a deputy to the Lviv City Council.

Chornovil became a People's Deputy of Ukraine from Ukraine's 115th electoral district on 5 July 2000, succeeding Roman Schmidt. From May 2002, Chornovil was a member of the Our Ukraine fraction of the Verkhovna Rada (Ukraine's parliament). During the Orange Revolution in Ukraine, Chornovil switched from Our Ukraine to the Party of Regions, a party that was antagonistic to Our Ukraine. In December 2004, Taras was the head of the Viktor Yanukovych election committee during the second voting round in the 2004 presidential election. In the 2006 Ukrainian parliamentary election, Chornovil was elected as a deputy to the Ukrainian parliament as a member of the Party of Regions (he was 3rd on their party list). On 28 November 2006, he was one of the only two Party of Regions MPs who voted in favour of the law recognizing Holodomor as genocide.

In October 2008 Chornovil left the Party of Regions. In June 2009 Chornovil was excluded from the structure of the Party of Regions faction by a decision of the political council of the Party of Regions.

After the first round of the 2010 presidential election Chornovil called on Ukrainians to vote for Yulia Tymoshenko (with Viktor Yanukovych being the other candidate during that round).

Chornovil joined Reforms for the Future in February 2011. On 9 February 2012 Chornovil left that faction.

In the 2012 parliamentary elections Chornovil was a candidate in single-member district number 212 (first-past-the-post wins a parliament seat) located in Kyiv; he became sixth in this district with 6.47% of the votes thus failed to win parliamentary representation.
