= Roman Kupchinsky =

Roman Kupchinsky (Vienna, November 1, 1944 - Washington D.C., January 19, 2010) served as a correspondent for RFE/RL and was director of Radio Liberty in Ukraine.
