= Agriculture in Ukraine =

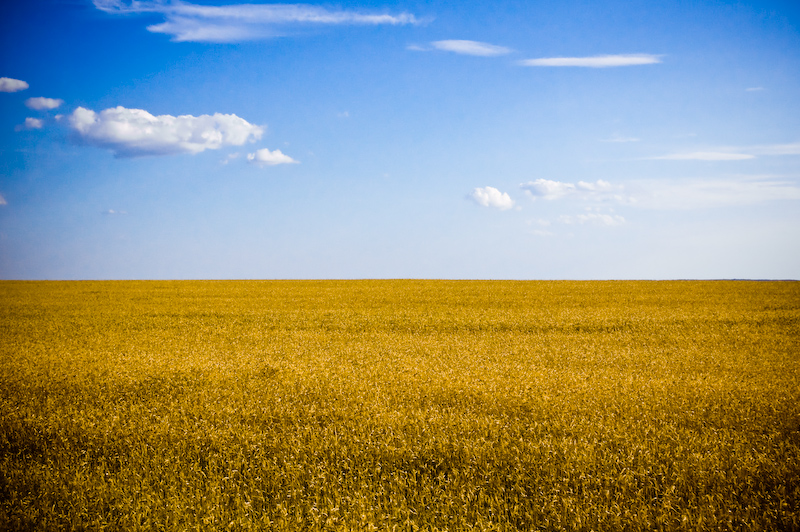
Ukraine's flag resembles the nation's farmlands. Pictured: Kherson Oblast.

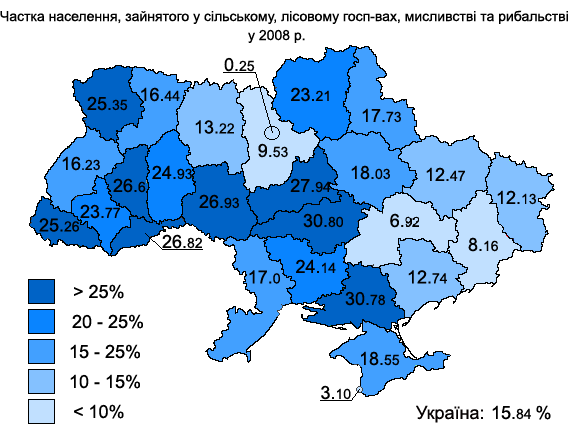
Percentage of population employed in agriculture and forestry, by 2008 data

Agriculture in Ukraine is one of the most important sectors of the Ukrainian economy. Although typically known as the industrial base of the former Soviet Union, Ukraine is one of the world's largest agricultural producers and exporters and is known as the "breadbasket of Europe". It encompasses about 30 to 40 millions of hectares of agricultural land, similar to Germany and France combined. In addition to providing the country's population with a stable supply of high-quality, safe and affordable food, Ukraine's agriculture sector is capable of making a significant contribution to solving the global problem of hunger. Its production potential significantly exceeds the needs of the domestic market. As such, Ukraine is an important supplier of food (and livestock feed) to North Africa, Asia, and Western Europe.

About 60% of Ukraine's soil used for agriculture consists of chornozem ("black earth"), a humus-rich soil type that is very fertile. Winter wheat, summer barley, and maize are the main cereal crops, while sunflowers and sugar beet are the main crops grown for industrial processing. The country has long been one of the world's largest agricultural exporters. For wheat, sugar beet, rapeseed, cucumber, rye, barley and walnuts, it was among the top 10 agricultural exporting countries in 2020, and for potatoes, buckwheat, cabbage, maize, pumpkin, carrots and sunflower oil, it was even among the top 5.

Agriculture underwent several major changes in the 20th and 21st centuries. The collectivisation of agriculture in the 1930s and privatisation at the end of the 20th century had particularly significant consequences. The Russo-Ukrainian War since 2014, and especially the full-scale Russian invasion of Ukraine since 24 February 2022, also had a major impact, as production in parts of the country was greatly reduced. As of May 2024, about 30% of the total potential of the agricultural sector was destroyed, and almost 20% of agricultural land was occupied as a direct result of Russia's war against Ukraine. On the other hand, by 2024, Ukraine's agricultural exports had recovered to pre-war levels.

== Land use ==
Agricultural land covers 42 million hectares, or 70% of the country's total land area. 78.9% of agricultural land is arable land and perennial plantations, 13.0% is pastures, 8.4% is hayfields. The highest proportion of arable land is in the Ukrainian regions of the Pontic–Caspian steppe (70–80%) and the East European forest steppe zones. Pastures are concentrated mainly in the Carpathian Mountains, Polissia and the south-eastern steppe regions, while hayfields are located in the river valleys of the Central European mixed forests and East European forest steppe zones.

=== Crop production ===
Farms use various crop rotation schemes, sometimes with two, sometimes with four or more crops. An example of such a rotation scheme is fallow, winter wheat, winter wheat, sunflowers, spring barley and maize. Fallow is used to maintain moisture levels. Sometimes the same crop is grown for several years in a row, particularly alfalfa (lucerne).

Production, harvested area and yield of major crops by region, 2014

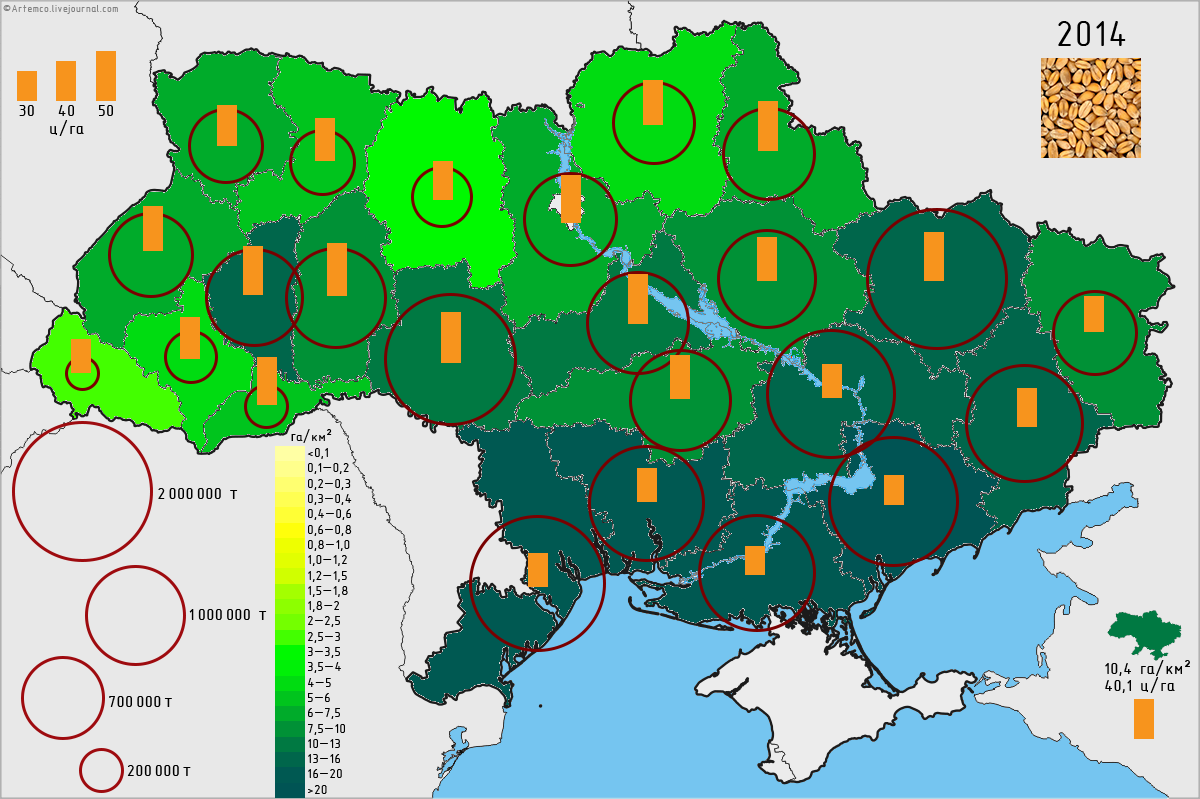
wheat

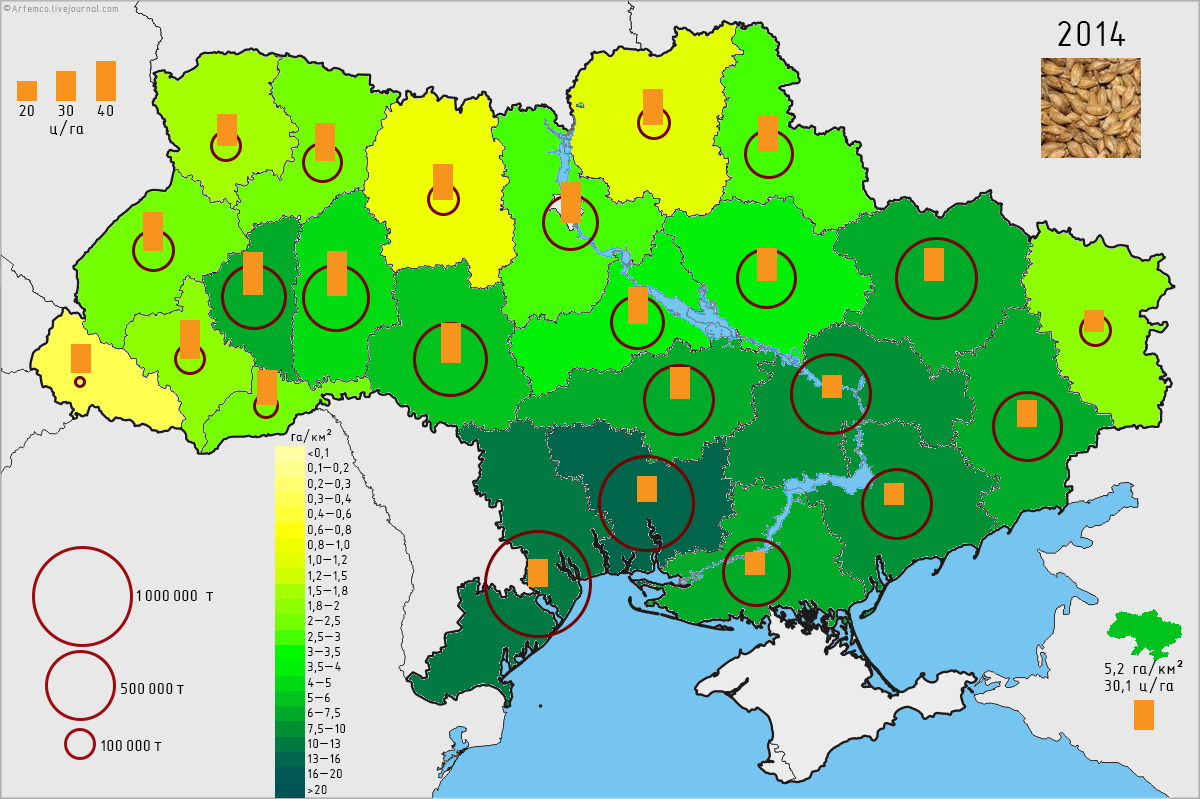
barley

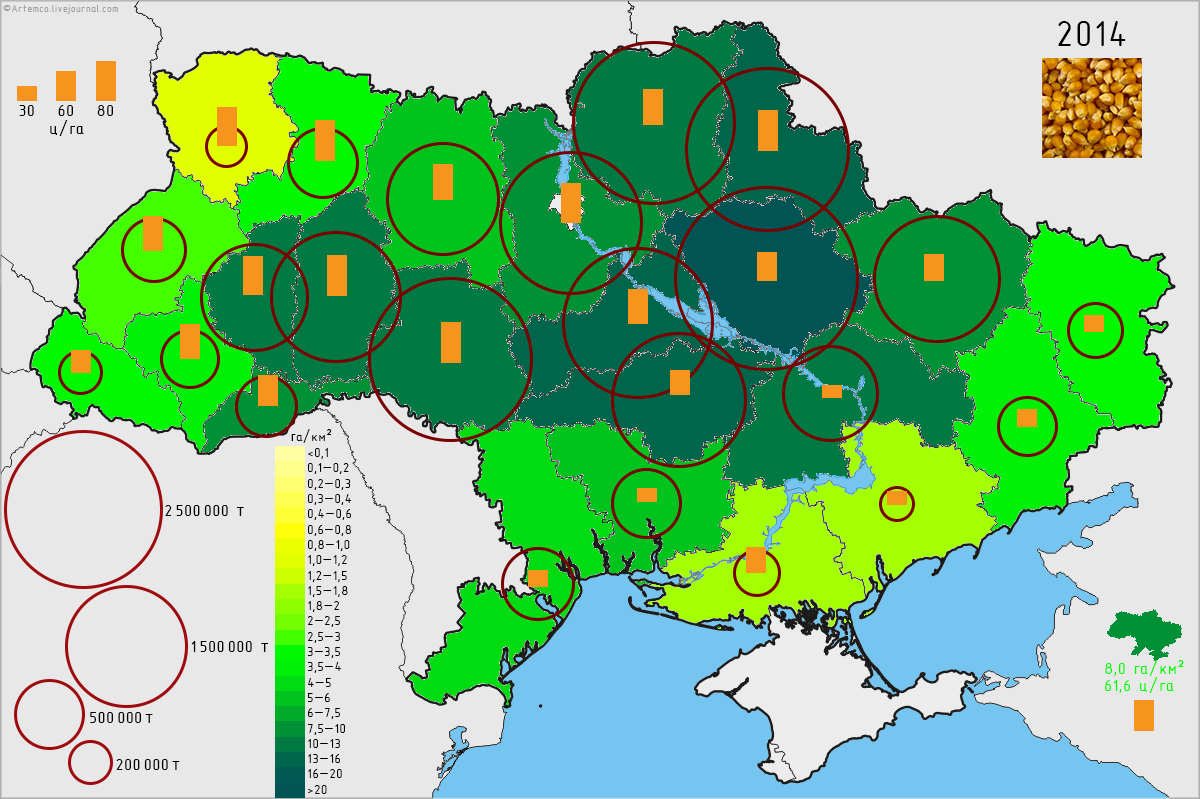
maize

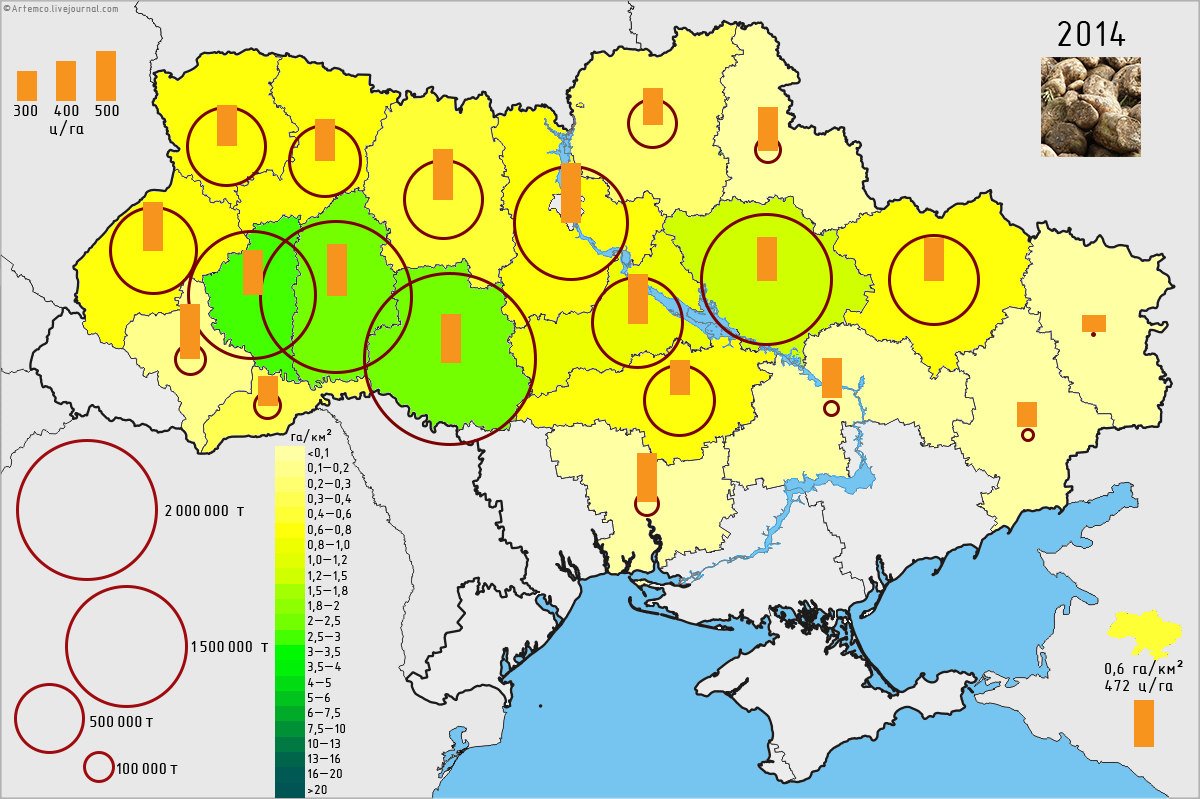
sugar beet

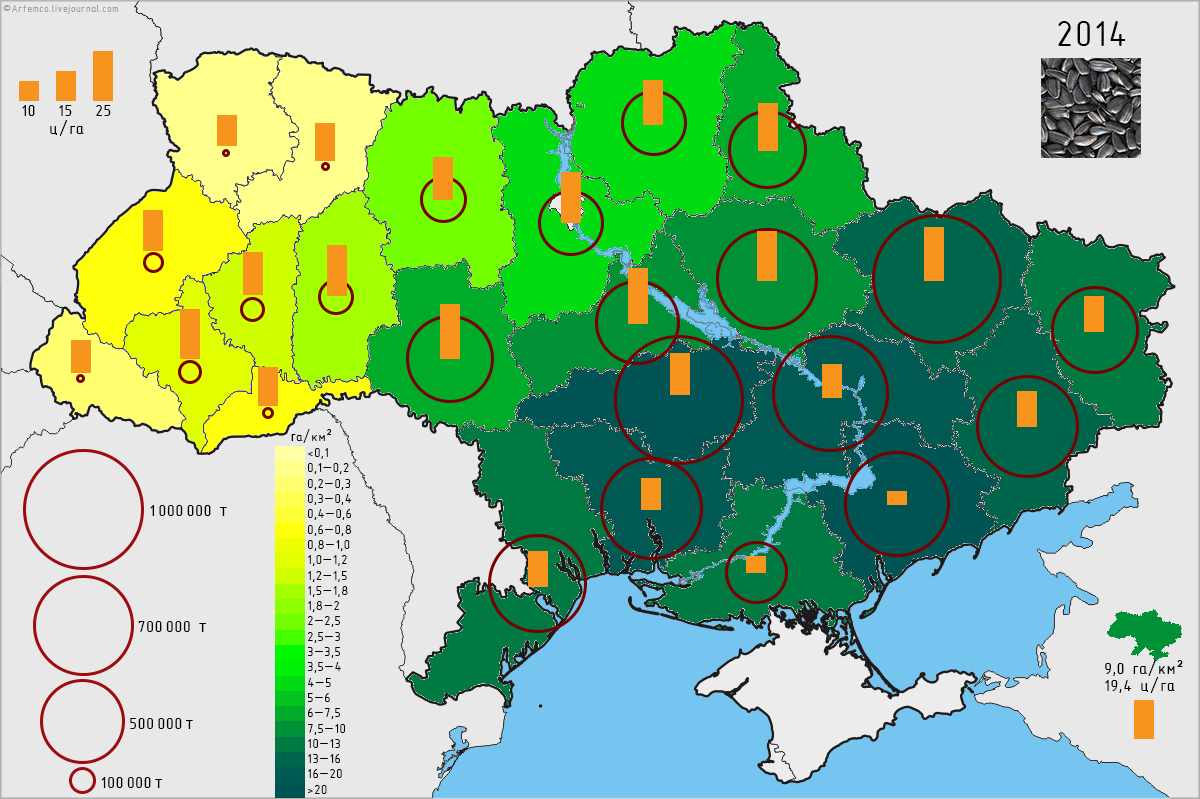
sunflower

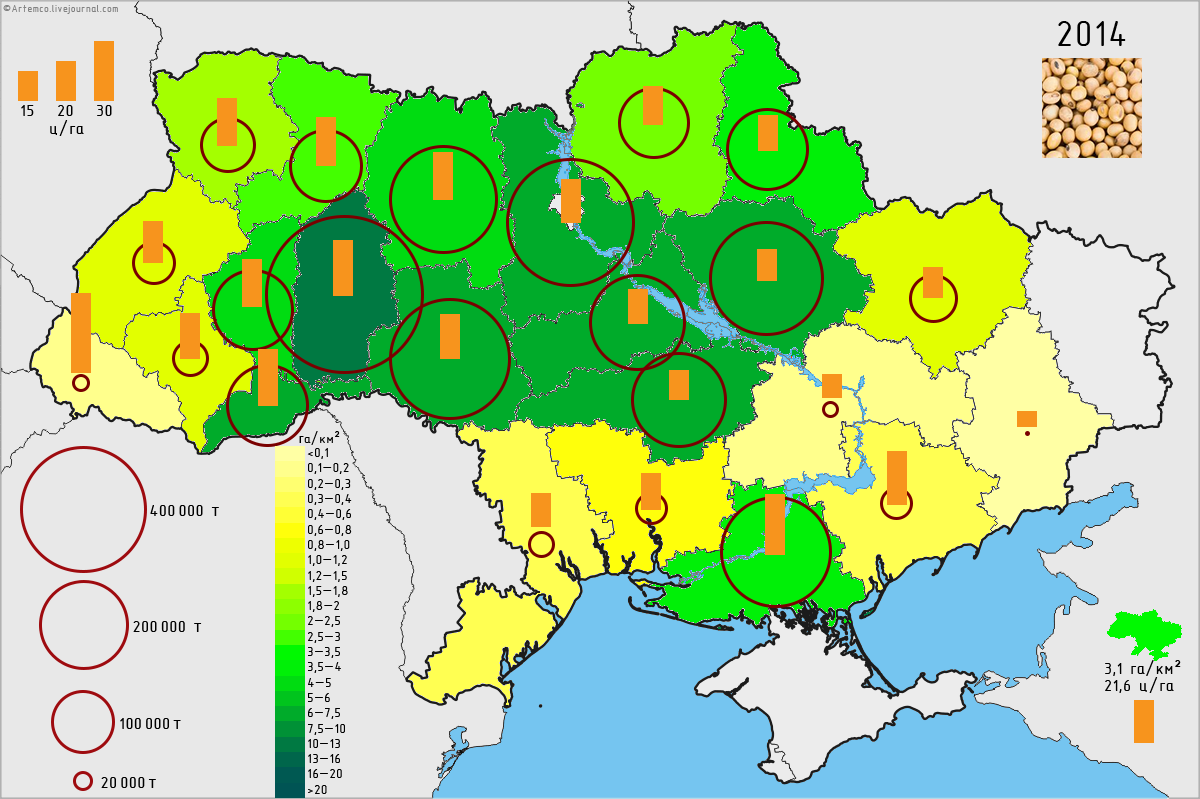
soybean

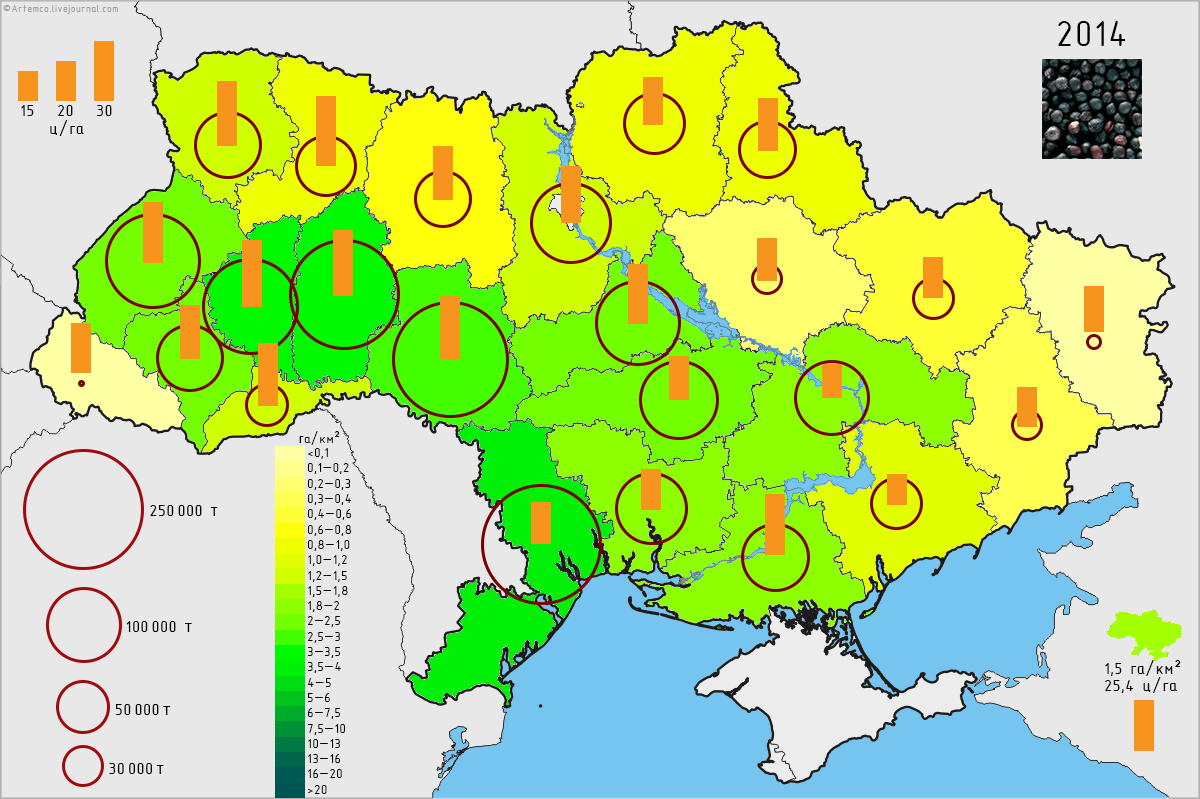
rapeseed

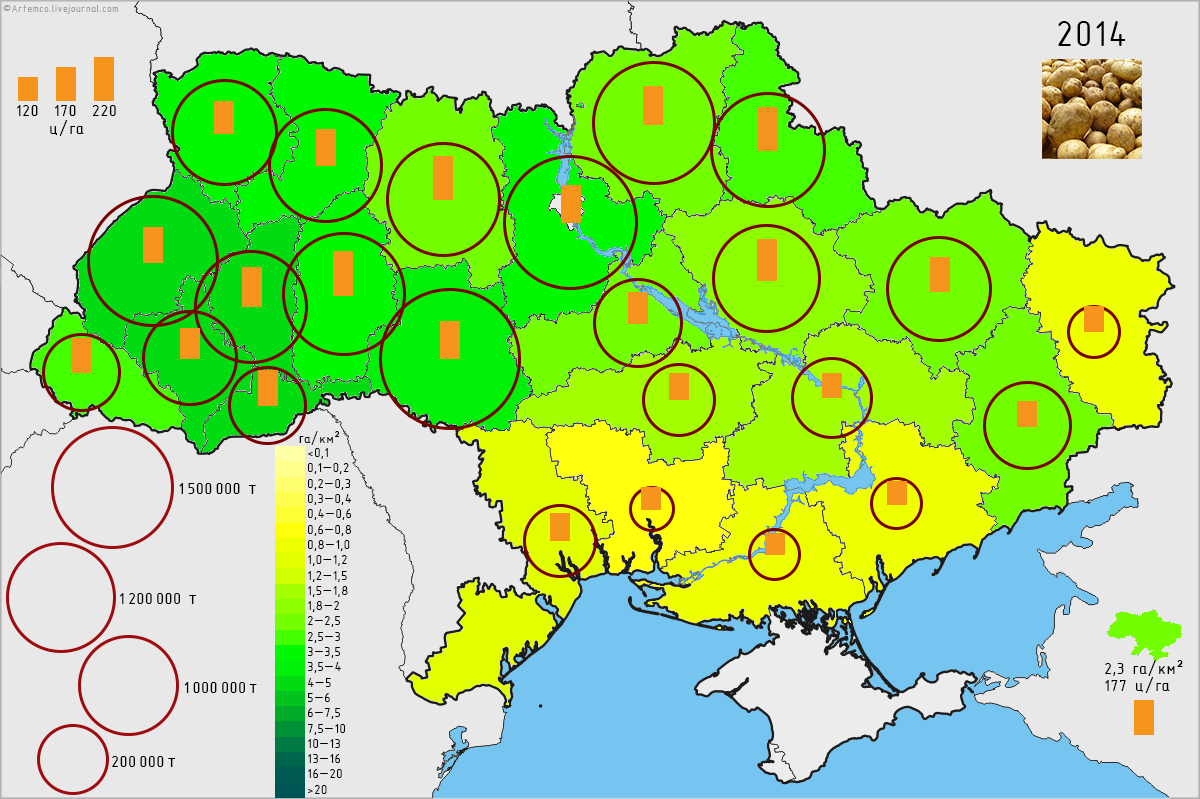
potato

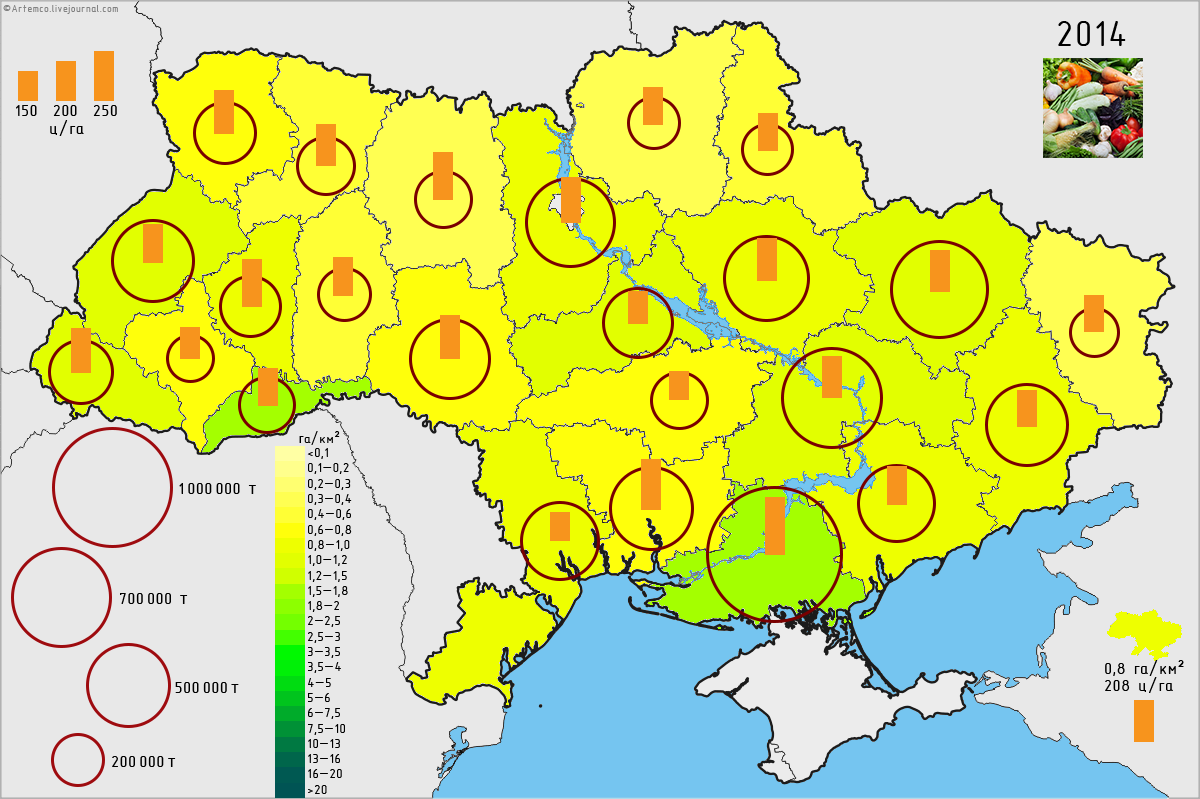
vegetables

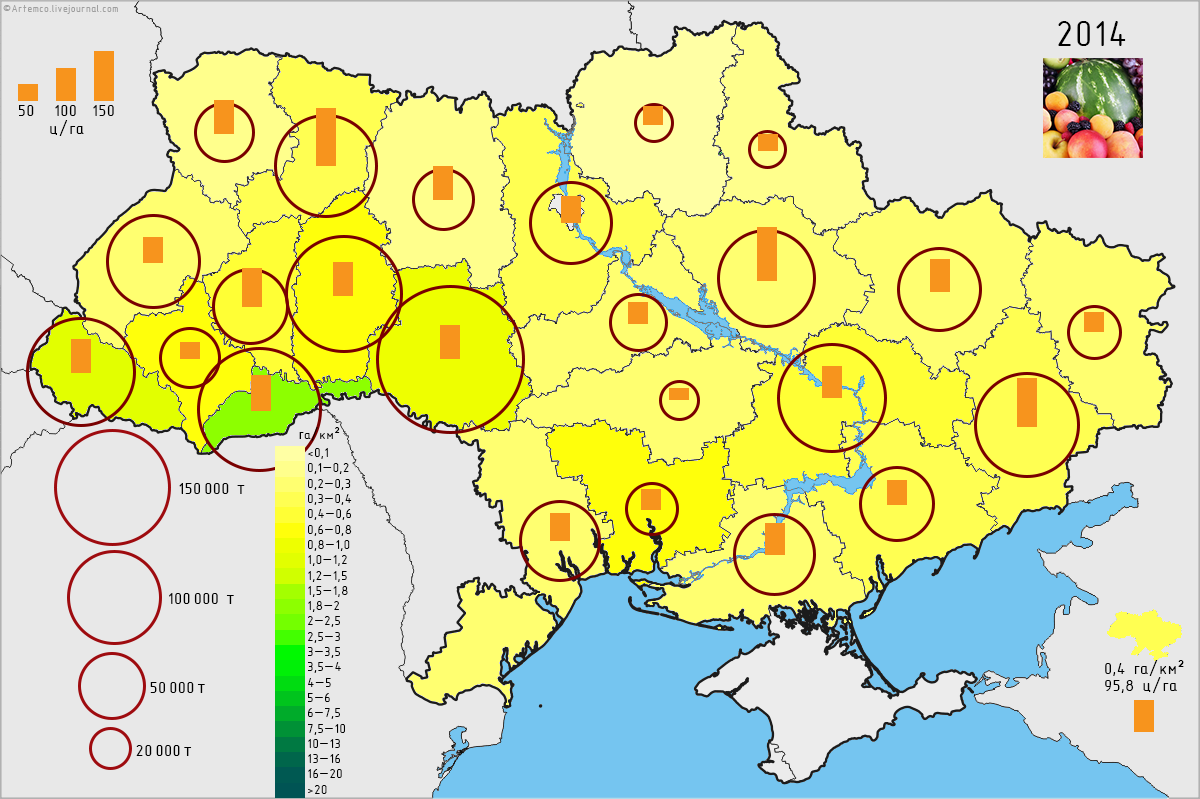
fruits and berries

==== Grains ====
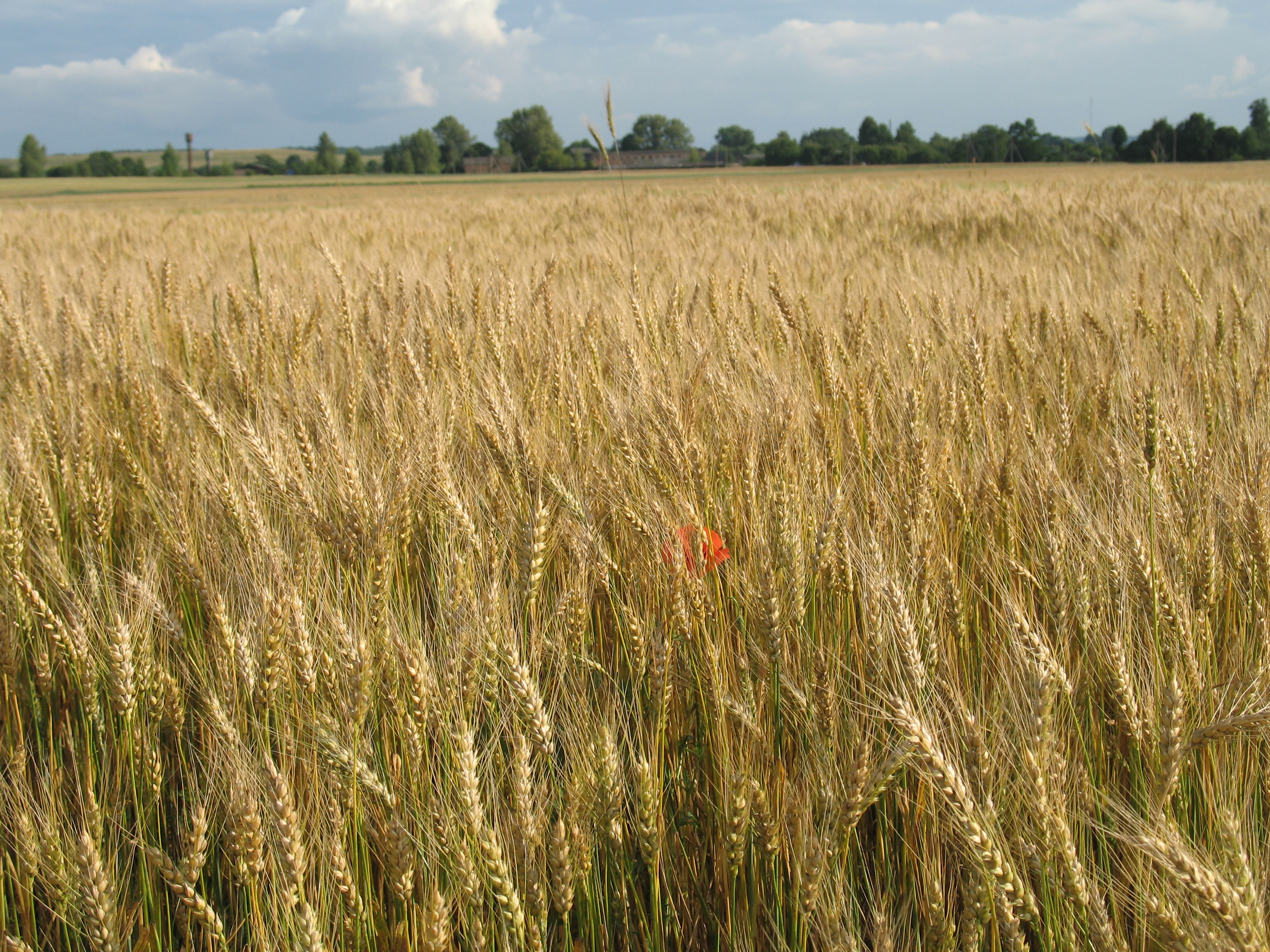
Wheat field in Rivne Oblast (2011)

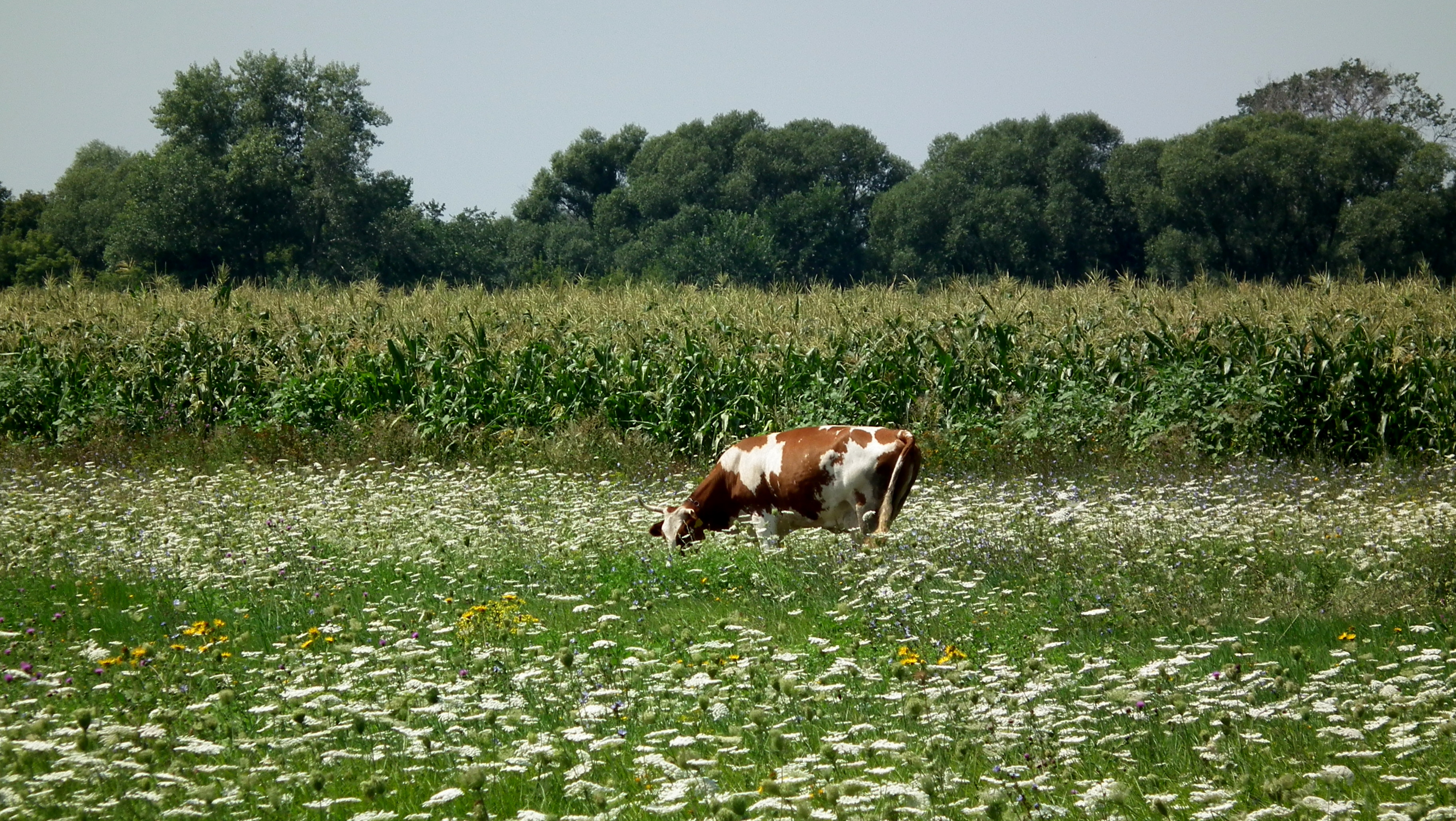
Maize field behind a cow in a flowery meadow in Luhansk Oblast (2011)

The main crops in agriculture are cereals: winter and spring wheat, rye, winter and spring barley, maize, oats, buckwheat, millet and rice. Grain farming plays an important role in Ukraine's agricultural sector, ensuring a stable supply of bread and bakery products to the population, as well as raw materials for industrial processing. The production, processing and export of grain in Ukraine generates significant cash flows to the budget and is an important area of employment for the country's population. In addition, the country's grain industry has significant development potential, primarily due to the availability of abundant land resources and a sufficient amount of skilled labour.

- Ukraine's main grain crop is winter wheat. The main areas of its cultivation are the forest steppe and the northern steppe regions. Spring wheat has lower yields compared to winter wheat and is mainly grown in the steppe regions of Ukraine with harsher winter conditions and almost no permanent snow cover. After a decline in wheat harvests in the 1990s, yields subsequently increased again.
- Barley is the second most important grain crop in Ukraine. Spring barley is grown in Polissia, and winter barley in the southern steppe and in the foothills of Crimea. Barley is the most important feed grain in Ukraine, with summer barley accounting for more than 90 per cent of the total.
- Maize is the third most important feed grain in Ukraine in terms of acreage. The best conditions for its cultivation are in the northern and central steppe and southern forest-steppe. More than half of the maize is used for silage. Most of the rest is used for poultry and pig feed.
- Winter rye is a valuable food crop. The main areas of its cultivation are Polissia and the western forest-steppe. Oats are common in the same areas as rye and serve as a complementary fodder crop.
- Sunflower is Ukraine's most important oilseed crop and has long been the most profitable crop. Originally, sunflowers were not grown on the same field more than once every seven years in order to prevent fungal diseases and maintain soil fertility. Later, cultivation became more intensive.
- Buckwheat has a large area of Ukraine devoted to its cultivation. The largest buckwheat crops are concentrated in Polissia and partly in the forest-steppe region.
- Millet is mainly grown in the forest-steppe and steppe regions.
- Rice is grown as a food crop on irrigated land in Mykolaiv, Kherson oblasts and in Crimea.

==== Potatoes and sugar beets ====
- Potatoes are valuable, vitamin-rich food products that are raw materials for the food industry and valuable fodder. In terms of production, potatoes are second only to grain and are used as a food product, for technical processing into alcohol, starch, molasses and as animal feed. The main areas of potato production are Polissia and the forest-steppe of Ukraine, as well as the suburbs of large cities.
- Sugar beet production and acreage fell by half between 1994 and 2003. The acreage of sugar beet increased on privately owned plots. The main regions for growing sugar beets are the forest-steppe, northern steppe, and southern Polissia.

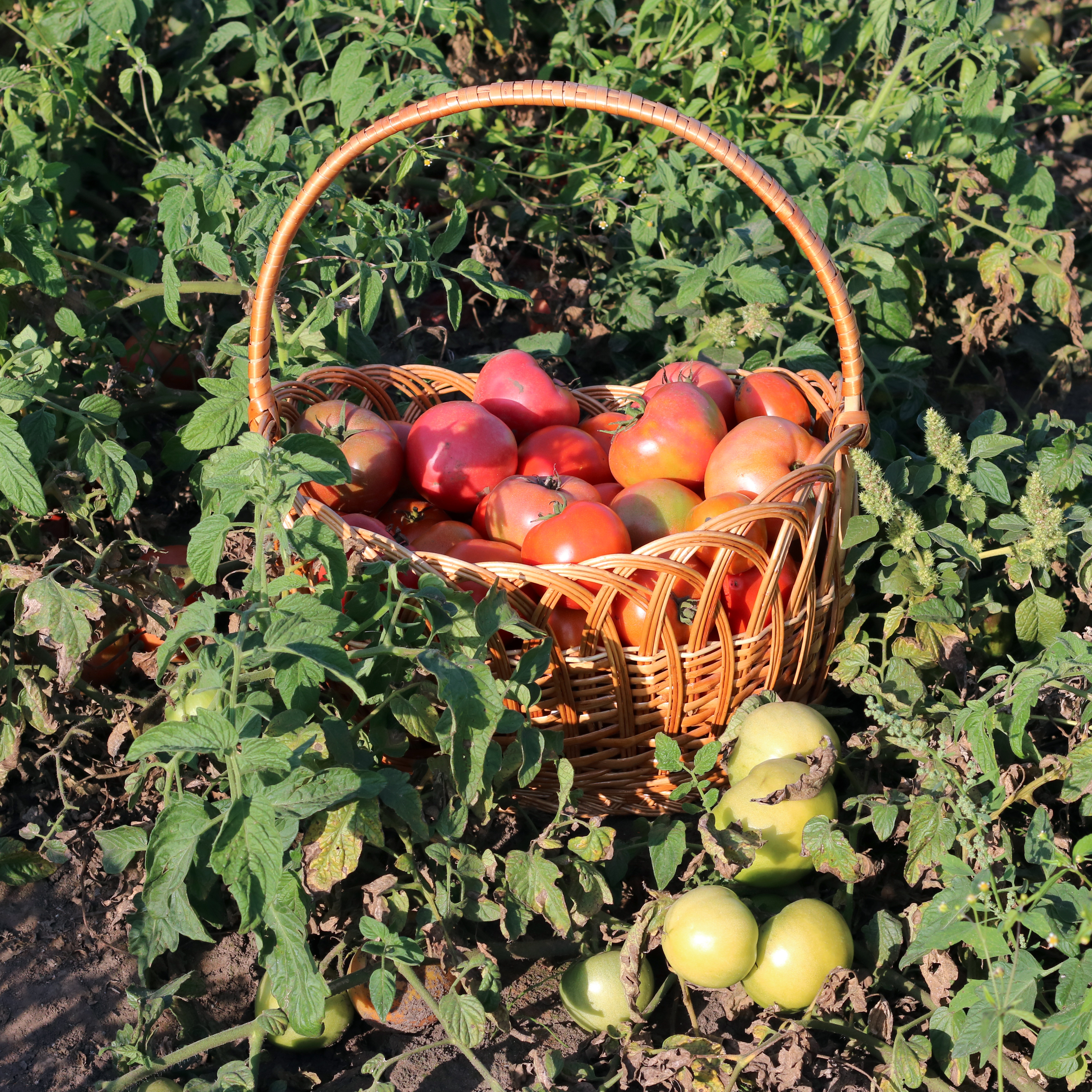
Tomatoes in a wicker basket during the harvest in Vinnytsia Oblast (August 2022)

==== Vegetables ====
According to the 2024 report by the Center for Food and Land Use Research of the Kyiv School of Economics (KSE), Ukraine produced more cabbages and cucumbers in total in 2021 than any of the top 9 vegetable-producing EU countries (Spain, Poland, the Netherlands, Italy, Germany, France, Greece, Romania, and Portugal). Amongst the other three major vegetable crops – tomatoes, onions, and carrots – Ukrainian production volumes were also above the median values of these 9 top EU producer countries in 2021.

Nevertheless, the top EU producers had a higher yield per hectare (and thus higher productivity/effiency) for all five vegetables except cabbage (for which Ukrainian yields per hectare were very close to Italian yields). The gap in yields is highest in tomatoes and cucumbers, which might be explained by the fact that Ukraine has a much larger percentage of these plants grown in the open field rather than in protected greenhouses or polytunnels, as is common in the EU's top-producing countries such as the Netherlands.

==== Fruit and wine ====
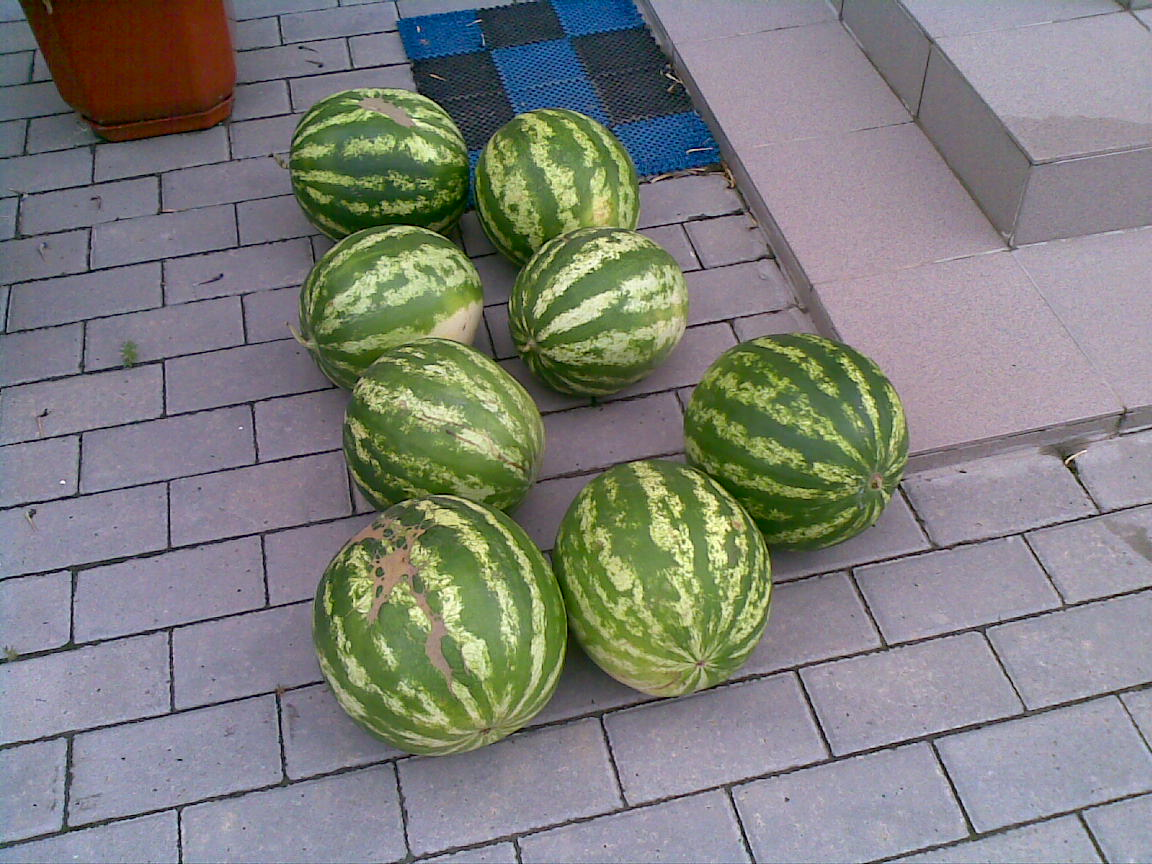
Kherson watermelons

The watermelon is a symbol of the region of Kherson Oblast, Ukraine. More than 50% of the watermelons in Ukraine are produced in Kherson Oblast and are shipped upriver to Kyiv.

Ukraine also produces some wine, mostly in the southwestern regions, such as in Odesa Oblast, Zakarpattia Oblast, and Crimea.

=== Livestock breeding ===
Livestock breeding in Ukraine has the place of a kind of ‘processing’ industry that transforms crop products into foodstuffs and technical raw materials. Livestock farming accounts for over 38% of gross agricultural output. Its main branches are cattle breeding, pig breeding, sheep breeding, and poultry farming. Livestock farming also includes aquaculture, beekeeping, and silk farming. In general, the objectives of animal husbandry are to produce high-quality food products and valuable raw materials for the food industry and light industry. The production process in animal husbandry is more mechanised and contributes to the transition of the industry to an industrial basis.

Production of certain types of livestock products:

All types of meat

- 1991 — 4.1 million tonnes
- 1997 — 1.9 million tonnes
- 2001 — 2.3 million tonnes
- 2007 — 2.8 million tonnes
- 2012 — 3.1 million tonnes

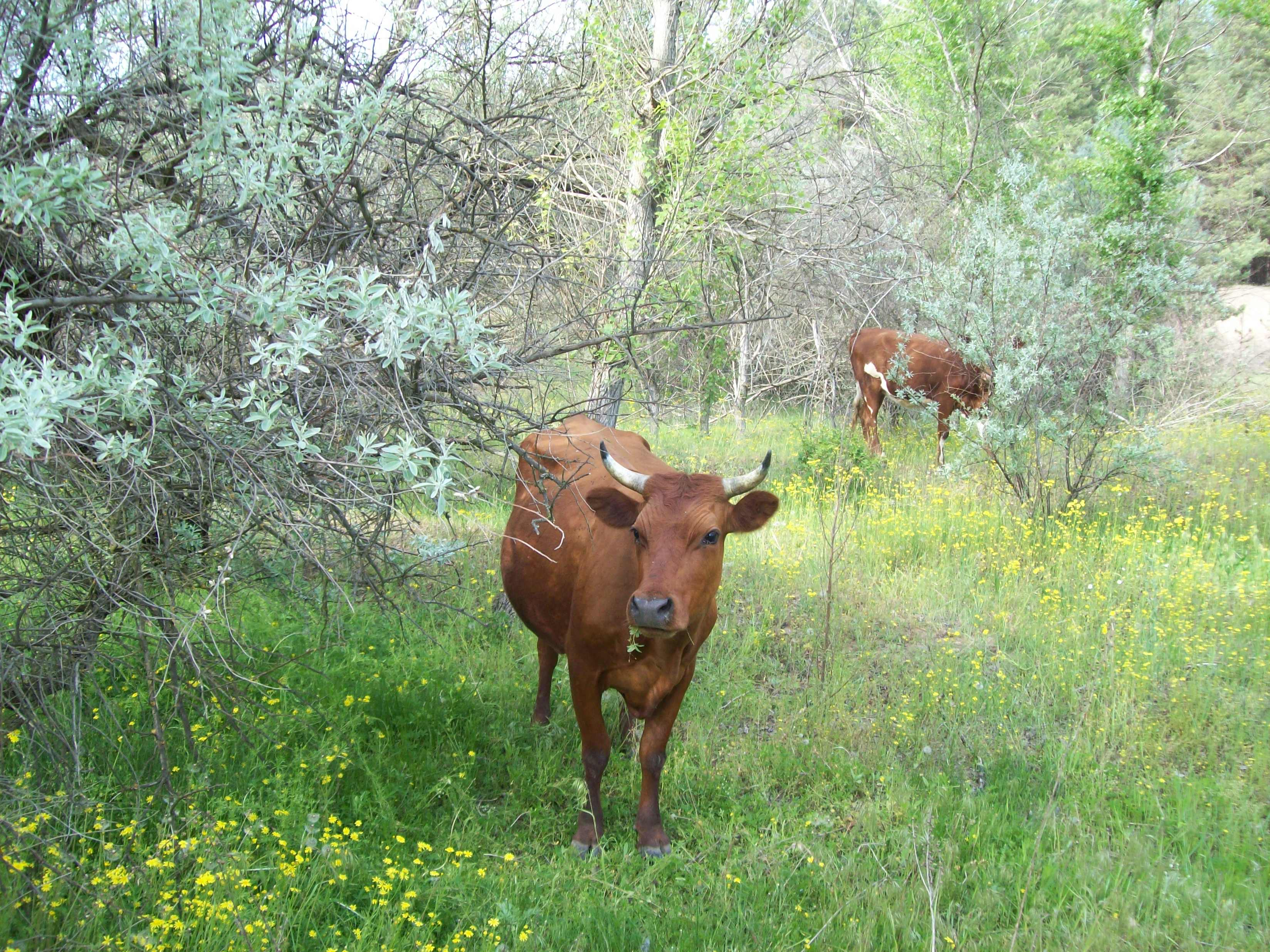
Red steppe cattle, pictured in the forest south of Mykolaiv in May 2010

Milk

- 1991 — 22.7 million tonnes
- 1997 — 13.7 million tonnes
- 2001 — 13.4 million tonnes
- 2007 — 12.3 million tonnes
- 2012 — 11.4 million tonnes
Production of milk, meat and eggs by region, 2014

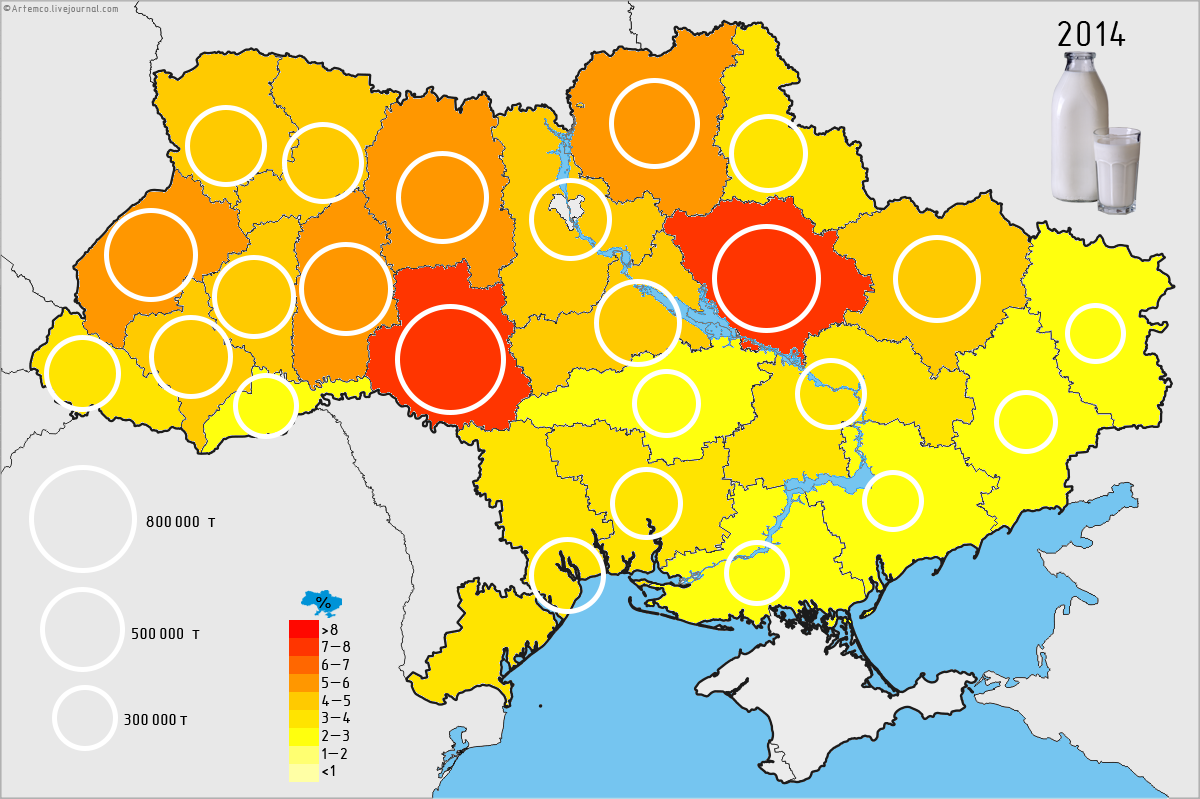
Milk production, 2014

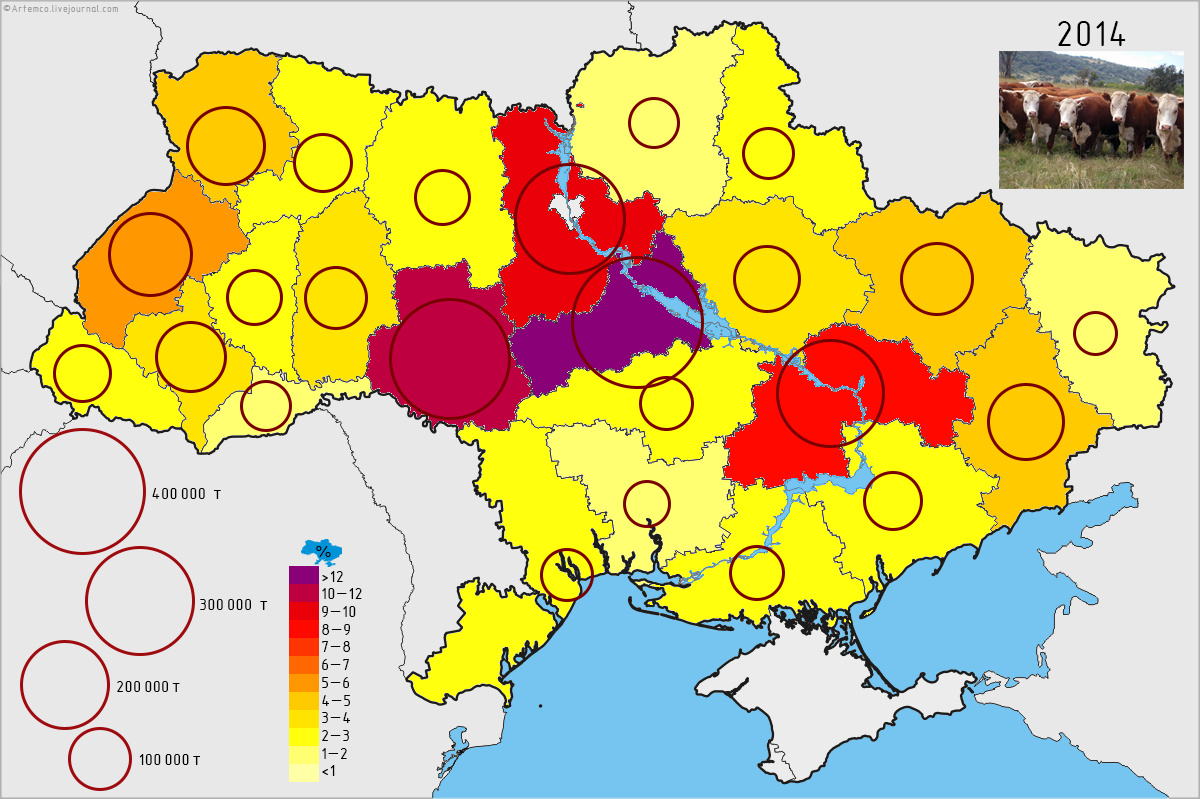
Meat production in live weight, 2014

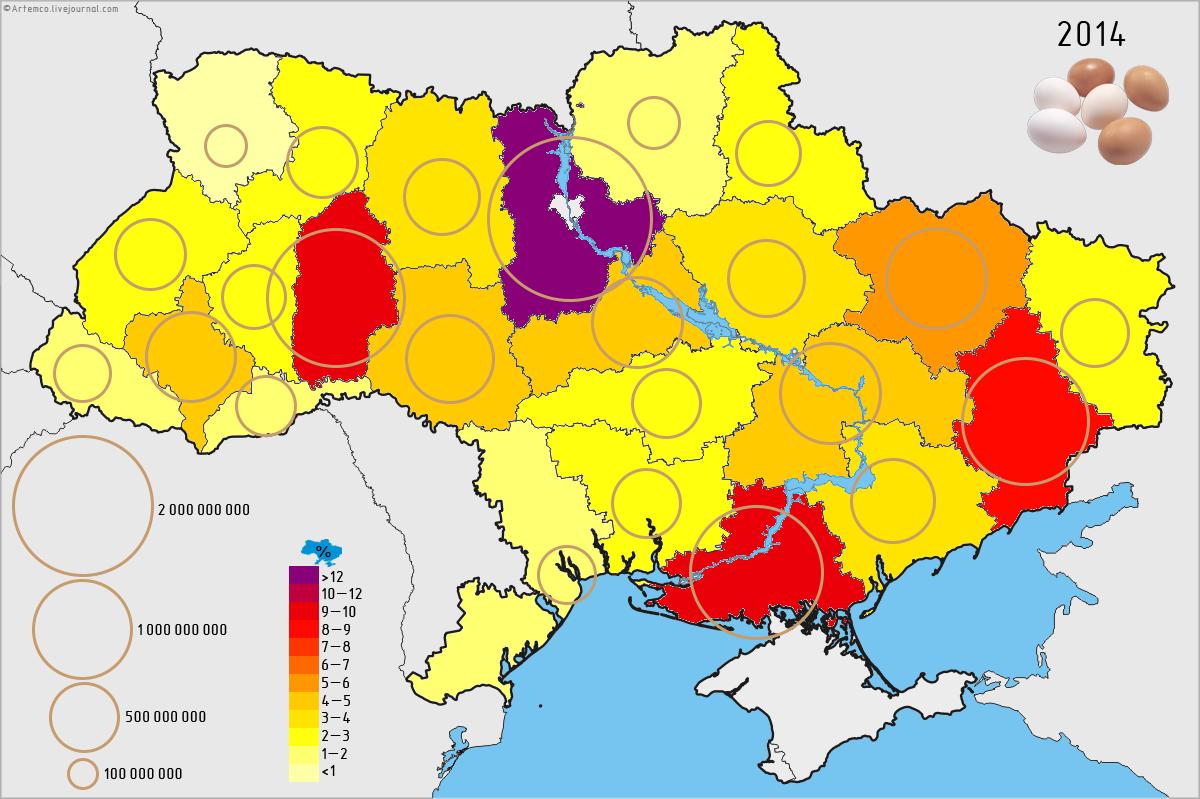
Egg production, 2014

== History ==
Geography has long influenced the economy of the Ukrainian lands. Rich fertile soils (such as chornozem areas) made the area a "breadbasket": for ancient Greece, as well as for early modern Europe, later the Soviet Union, and again Europe in the 21st century.

=== Prehistoric agriculture ===
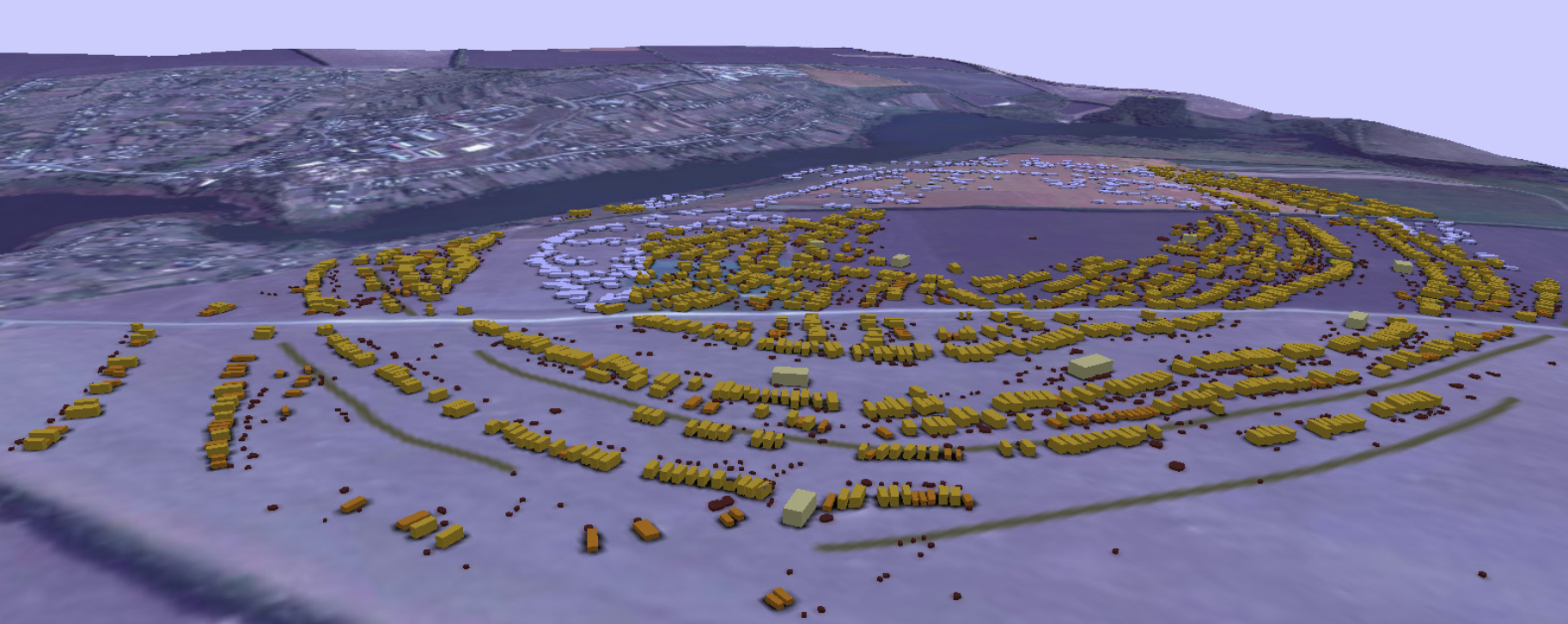
3D model of the Cucuteni–Trypillia culture settlement of Maidanetske, c. 3700 BCE.

The oldest evidence of large-scale agriculture on the modern territory of Ukraine (as well as Moldova and Romania) comes from the Cucuteni–Trypillia culture (abbreviated CT), a Neolithic–Chalcolithic archaeological culture (c. 5050 to 2950 BCE). There is still much uncertainty and disagreement amongst scholars of this CT group, ranging from questions about the relative size of these settlements (the standard view being that these may have been home to thousands of people, with maximalists claiming tens of thousands, and minimalists only small-sized villages), their permanence versus their seasonality, and their degree of urbanisation versus agrarian rurality.

=== Ancient agriculture ===
Ancient Greek colonies located on the Crimean Peninsula such as Chersonesus, or elsewhere along the northern Black Sea coast such as Pontic Olbia and the Bosporan Kingdom, were net exporters of grain, and to a lesser degree wine. By contrast to southern mainland Greece, there was no cultivation of olive trees on the northern Black Sea shore. Around 550 BCE, more than a century before the traditional foundation date of Chersonesos in 422/1 BCE, the Tauri people already must have engaged in trade with the Greek world, due to the discovery of "Ionian pottery, some rare fragments of Boeotian black figured ware, and Chiot amphorae" in its oldest layers in the 1990s. A large-scale expansion and transformation of agriculture aimed at winemaking in Crimea developed in Chersonesos after 350 BCE. Paleobotanist Zosia Yanushevich and colleagues demonstrated in 1985 that wine production in ancient Chersonesus involved a domesticated variant of the wild grape Vitis vinifera sylvestris. Earlier studies from Yanushevich and Nikolaenko (1979) demonstrated that the Tarkhankut Peninsula in western Crimea was also well-suited for wheat crops, and that Chersonesos dominated the grain trade with western Crimean settlements like Belyaus, Kalos Limen, and Bolshoy/Velykyj Kastel'.

=== Kievan Rus' (c. 880–1240) ===
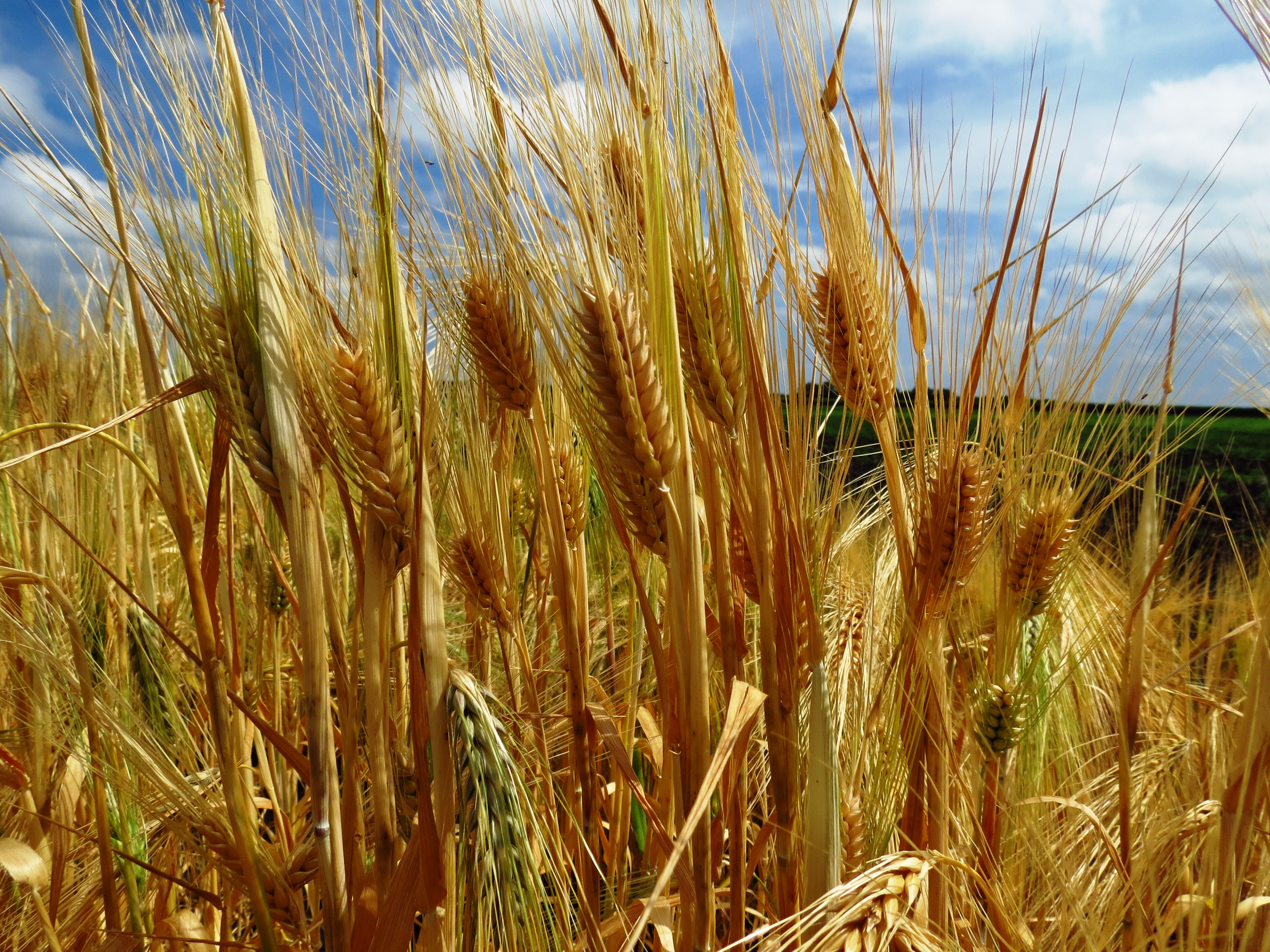
Spring barley in the field (pictured in 2015, modern Ukraine). Archaeological evidence suggests northern communities were planting both winter and spring crops as early as the 11th and 12th centuries, sowing winter rye late in the year that sprouted once snows melted in spring. The southerners had longer growing seasons, and fertile black soils, and typically cultivated millet instead of rye.

The main cereal grain crops in Kievan Rus' were rye in the north, millet in the south, supplemented by barley, wheat, buckwheat, and oats. Peas, lentils, flax, and hemp were also grown.

The lands of Kievan Rus' were primarily located in two climatic zones: the Eurasian Steppe (including parts of the East European forest steppe and Ponto-Caspian steppe) with the highly fertile black soils south and west of Kiev (encompassing most of present-day Ukraine), and the forest zone in the northwest (including the Novgorod Republic and present-day Belarus) and the northeast (including the region known as Zalesye, or "area beyond the forest", which became the core of Vladimir-Suzdal). Unlike the forest-steppes in the southwest, the northern forestlands (covered with cedar and birch trees, and more to the south oak trees) were generally well-watered, with adequate precipitation and extensive river systems to sustain agriculture. However, the lands north of the 50th parallel (above Kiev) had short growing seasons, and lacked the highly fertile black soils of the southwest.

The northern climate always made agriculture precarious, never allowed for abundant production, and sometimes the farming system broke down. Several famines have been recorded in written sources, such as the 1024 famine in Suzdalia caused by a drought, prompting the inhabitants to buy grain from Volga Bulgaria. Another famine took place in the Rostov region and Yaroslavl in 1071. Throughout the year 1092, there was a drought in southern Kievan Rus', after which a late frost destroyed young crops and ruined the harvest, causing another famine.

In the forest-steppe zone, the steam farming system with two- and three-land crop rotations was used, in the forest zone the slash-and-burn agriculture system and shifting cultivation (long fallowing) system. Woods were cut down and burnt, thus freeing up arable land and fertilising the soil at the same time. In forest-steppe and steppe regions, the most common farming system was fallowing (crop rotation), in which the fertility of the land was restored naturally.

High labour productivity made it possible to produce more grain than was necessary to meet the biological needs of the population. This, as well as the availability of excellent pastures and hayfields, allowed feudal households to keep large numbers of livestock. For tilling the soil and growing crops, the most advanced tools of the time were used: scythes (for mowing hay), sickles (for reaping), hoes, spades, ards, ploughs, sokhas, harrows, mattocks, and others for digging or ploughing, which were sophisticated enough to ensure high yields – on average, slightly less than 8 centners of grain per hectare. A flail was used to thresh the grain. Sometimes peasants formed collectives to share equipment and help each other with farm work.

=== Galicia–Volhynia (1199–1349) ===
The economy of Galicia–Volhynia was predominantly a subsistence economy. It was based on agriculture, which was based on self-sufficient lands: the dvoryshche (Ukrainian: дворище). These were rural agricultural communities, owned and run by a group of related families (remnants of the earlier clan system), comparable to the zadrugas amongst the South Slavs. These economic units had their own arable land, hayfields, meadows, forests, foraging grounds and fish lakes. The main agricultural crops were oats and rye, less so wheat and barley. In addition, animal husbandry was developed, primarily horse breeding, as well as sheep breeding and pig breeding. Important components of the economy were foraging: animal hunting, honey hunting, and fishing.

=== Cossack Hetmanate (1649–1764) ===
"Ukraine is a very fertile country, as are Ruthenia and Podolia, and once the soil is cultivated, it yields abundant grains (...). (Note: Chevalier goes off on a tangent by claiming that: "la terre pour peu qu'elle soit cultivée, y rapporte tant de grains de toutes sortes, que les habitans ne sçavent la pluspart du temps qu'en faire: leurs rivieres n'estans point navigables." ("The soil, provided it is cultivated, yields such an abundance of grain of all kinds that the inhabitants are at a loss most of the time as to what to do with it: their rivers being unnavigable"). This specific assertion seems to be borrowed directly from the Description of Ukraine, published three years earlier in 1660 by fellow French-officer-in-Polish-service Guillaume Le Vasseur de Beauplan, who wrote: "La fertilité du terroir leur produit du grain en telle abondance, qu'ils ne sçauroient souuent qu'en faire: d'autant qu'ils n'ont pas riuieres nauigables qui se déchargent en la mer , excepté le Boristhene qui arreste la nauigation 50. lieuës au dessous de Kiou par le moyen de 13. sauts qu'on y trouue (...) & c'est ce qui leur empesche de transporter leurs grains en Constantinople." ("The fertility of the soil yields such an abundance of grain that they often do not know what to do with it; all the more so as they have no navigable rivers flowing into the sea, except for the Borysthenes [Dnipro], which is impassable 50 leagues downstream from Kyiv due to 13 rapids found there (...) & this is what prevents them from transporting their grain to Constantinople.")) The large number of [rivers and streams] indicates good soil quality. (...) Ukraine is also very rich in various livestock, game and fish; there is a lot of honey and wax, wood, which, in addition to ordinary consumption, is used for building houses. The inhabitants of Ukraine lack only wine and salt; the former they get from Hungary, Transylvania, Wallachia and Moldavia; beer, honey and vodka are distilled from grain; those are very popular here. Salt they import from the Wieliczka Salt Mine near Kraków, or Pokuttia."

— Pierre Chevalier, French officer (1663)

As the Cossack Hetmanate emerged out of the Polish–Lithuanian Commonwealth, agriculture remained the main branch of the economy. One of the main causes of the Khmelnytsky Uprising was the anti-feudal struggle of the domestic peasantry. Therefore, immediately after the formation of their own state, all the property of the old Polish magnate nobility was expropriated by the people. Magnates, nobility, and tenants were driven out, and their lands, livestock, and property were transferred to Cossacks, peasants, burghers, and the state administration. The legislation of the Polish–Lithuanian Commonwealth lost its force and the peasants became free. The temporary partial return to the old feudal norms after the defeat in the Battle of Berestechko and the Treaty of Bila Tserkva only strengthened the resistance of the peasantry to the "hereditary lords". Finally, on the territory of the Ukrainian state, the folwark (Ukrainian: filvarka) manor system of management, the land ownership of the crown land, Polish and Ukrainian magnates and nobility, and the Catholic Church were eliminated after the victory in the Battle of Batih (1652).

The main part of the liberated territories (and it was a significant land fund: the kingdom owned about 150 cities and towns, magnates and nobles owned about 1,500, and the Catholic Church – 50 estates), as well as uninhabited lands, passed to the state fund, which was owned by the Military Treasury is a component of the apparatus of the Hetman-Starshyna administration. The supreme administrator of the land was the hetman, locally it was managed by colonels and centurions. The lands of Orthodox monasteries and the higher clergy, small nobility, Cossacks and burghers remained in private ownership.

Personally, free peasants had to pay a tax to the Military Treasury in the form of a monetary rent. Peasants of free military villages considered the land they cultivated to be their property. In the second half of the 17th – at the beginning of the 18th century, it was freely inherited, given, sold, bought. In privately owned, temporary-conditional possessions, the peasants' right to use the land was limited, and when buying and selling land, only the right to its possession was transferred with existing coercions in favor of the land owners.

After the Khmelnytsky Uprising, 80-90% of peasants owned land. According to the materials of the Russian general Rumyantsev's description of "Little Russia", the peasants of the Starshyna, monastery, and government were divided into those who owned land and those who were landless. Allotment owners bequeathed land, leased it, bought and sold it, organized farms. The number of wealthy peasants, who concentrated a large part of allotment land and livestock, increased. The landless commoners either engaged in agriculture on senior, monastic, state land allocated to them for temporary use, or lived off the sale of labor. Some landless peasants kept a lot of cattle, beehives, were engaged in crafts and trades. Some of them had up to 30 to 40 heads of cattle, 20 to 30 pigs, 30 to 40 horses, and up to 300 sheep. Some peasants, the so-called servants, did not have any farms and constantly lived in the foreman's estates either "for subsistence" or for an annual fee (2 to 10 karbovanets).

=== Ukrainian agriculture in the Russian Empire (1764–1919) ===
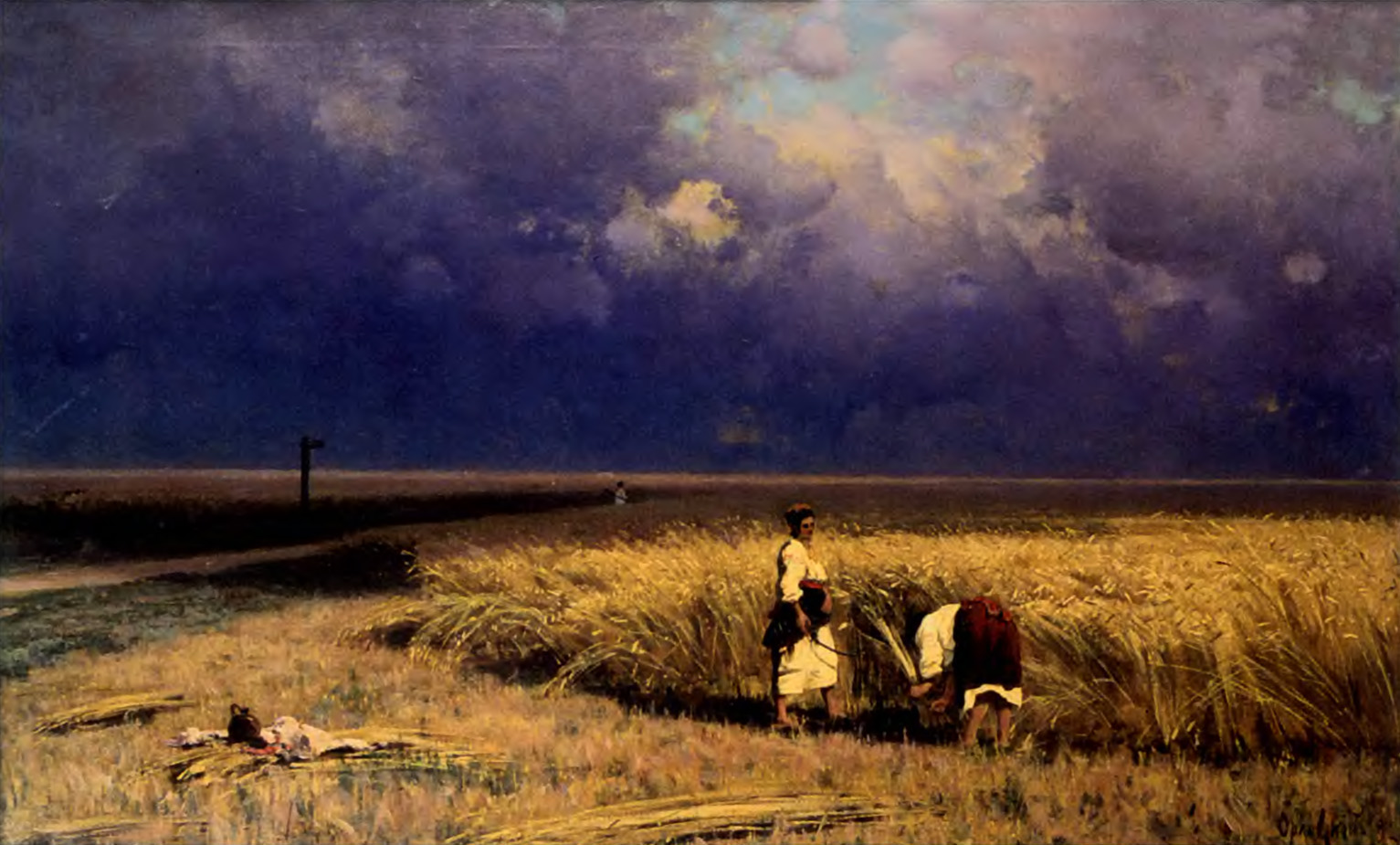
Harvest (1882) by Volodymyr Orlovsky

=== Agriculture in Interwar Polish Ukraine (1918–1939) ===
Statistically, the majority of citizens of the Second Polish Republic lived in the countryside (75% in 1921). Farmers made up 65% of the population. In 1929, agricultural production made up 65% of Poland's GNP. After 123 years of partitions, regions of the country were very unevenly developed. The lands of the former German Empire were the most advanced; in Greater Poland, Upper Silesia and Pomerelia, farming and crops were on a Western European level. The situation was much worse in parts of Congress Poland, the Eastern Borderlands, and what was formerly Galicia, where agriculture was quite backward and primitive, with a large number of small farms, unable to succeed in either the domestic or international market. Another problem was the overpopulation of the countryside, which resulted in chronic unemployment. Living conditions were so bad in several eastern regions, such as the counties inhabited by the Hutsul minority, that there was permanent starvation. Farmers rebelled against the government (see: 1937 peasant strike in Poland), and the situation began to change in the late 1930s, due to the construction of several factories for the Central Industrial Region, which gave employment to thousands of rural and small town residents.

=== Interwar Soviet Ukraine (1919–1945) ===
In the 1930s, under pressure from Joseph Stalin, agriculture became collective in nature, despite resistance from Ukrainian farmers. This reform led to the creation of large state farms and collective farms.

At the onset of Soviet Ukraine, having largely inherited conditions from the Tsarist Empire, one of the biggest exporters of wheat in the world, the Ukrainian economy was still centered around agriculture, with over 90% of the workforce being peasants. In the 1920s, Soviet policies in Ukraine attached importance to developing the economy. The initial agenda, War Communism, had prescribed total communisation and appropriation per quota of food from the people by force - further economic damage and a 1921–1923 famine in Ukraine claiming up to one million lives ensued. With the New Economic Policy and the partial introduction of free markets, an economic recovery followed.

During the 1920s, the majority of Ukraine's economic enterprises was subordinated to the union centre. In 1921 Soviet Ukraine's authorities introduced the system of khozraschet, which turned enterprises into autonomous subjects of the economy. Such enterprises were united into trusts, which represented separate branches of industry. At the same time, trusts were barred from paying taxes from their fixed assets, and were instead obliged to deliver a specially introduced "industrial tax", which increased their dependence on the state budget. The economic system was distorted due to the prioritization of non-consumer production by the regime. The period of NEP saw the revival of credit and financial institutions, a currency reform and the organization of state trade and cooperation. Starting from 1925 the economic policies experienced a turn towards industrialization and collectivization.

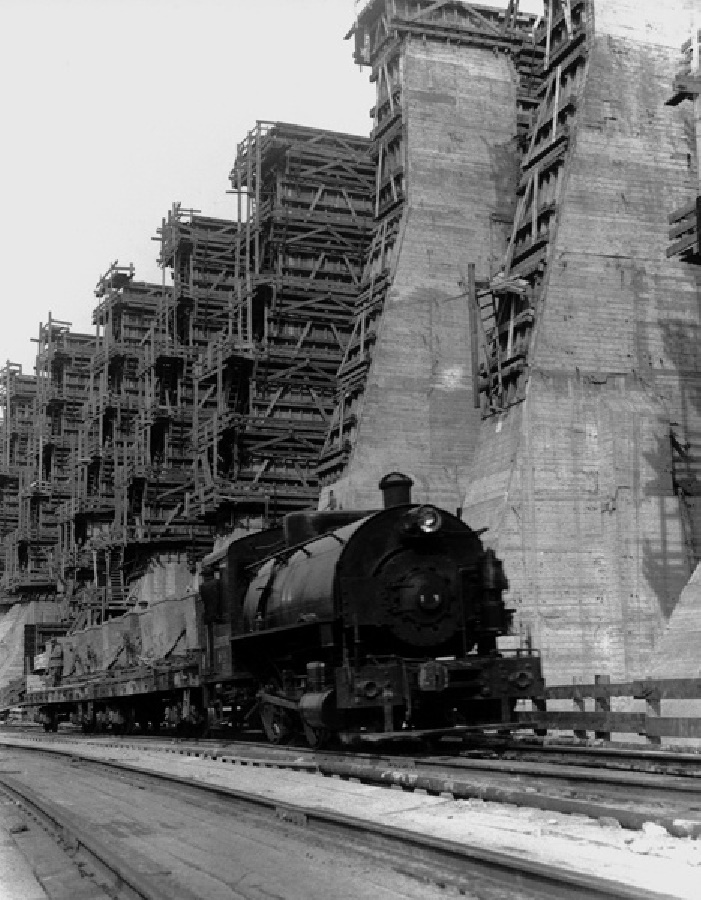
Construction of the Dnieper Hydroelectric Power Plant in Zaporizhzhia, 1931

After the death of Lenin and the consolidation of his power, Stalin was determined to accelerate industrialisation and reversed policy again. As heavy industry and wheat exports boomed, common people in rural areas were bearing a cost. Gradually escalating measures, from raised taxes, dispossession of property, and forced deportations into Siberia culminated in extremely high grain delivery quotas. Even though there is no evidence that agricultural yield could not feed the population at the time, four million Ukrainians were starved to death during the 1932–1933 Holodomor, while Moscow exported over a million tonnes of grain to the West, decimating the population.

In the aftermath of collectivization, the Soviet regime achieved a mode of coexistence with Ukraine's peasants through the employment of women in order to compensate for demographic losses during the famine, as well as mechanization of agriculture and the introduction of a passport system. In the industrial sphere, Soviet Ukraine during the 1930s was dominated by metallurgy and food industry. Between 1928 and 1937 the industrial growth in Ukrainian SSR achieved record numbers worldwide. The number of workers grew almost threefold. For the first time in history, by the late 1930s, less than half of Soviet Ukraine's population was employed in agriculture. During that time the republic was Europe's second biggest producer of pig iron and took the fourth place worldwide in coal production. At the same time, the development of Ukraine's industry repeated pre-revolutionary patterns, with most of its centers being concentrated in the Donbas-Dnieper region.

=== Cold War Soviet Ukraine (1945–1991) ===
In 1945, agricultural production stood at only 40 percent of the 1940 level, even though the republic's territorial expansion had "increased the amount of arable land". In contrast to the remarkable growth in the industrial sector, agriculture continued in Ukraine, as in the rest of the Soviet Union, to function as the economy's Achilles heel. Despite the human toll of collectivisation of agriculture in the Soviet Union, especially in Ukraine, Soviet planners still believed in the effectiveness of collective farming. The old system was reestablished; the numbers of collective farms in Ukraine increased from 28 thousand in 1940 to 33 thousand in 1949, comprising 45 million hectares; the numbers of state farms barely increased, standing at 935 in 1950, comprising 12.1 million hectares. By the end of the Fourth Five-Year Plan (in 1950) and the Fifth Five-Year Plan (in 1955), agricultural output still stood far lower than the 1940 level. The slow changes in agriculture can be explained by the low productivity in collective farms, and by bad weather-conditions, which the Soviet planning system could not effectively respond to. Grain for human consumption in the post-war years decreased, this in turn led to frequent and severe food shortages.

The increase of Soviet agricultural production was tremendous, however, the Soviet Ukrainians still experienced food shortages due to the inefficiencies of a highly centralised economy. During the peak of Soviet-Ukrainian agriculture output in the 1950s and early-to-mid-1960s, human consumption in Ukraine, and in the rest of the Soviet Union, actually experienced short intervals of decrease. There are many reasons for this inefficiency, but its origins can be traced back to the single-purchaser and -producer market system set up by Joseph Stalin. Khrushchev tried to improve the agricultural situation in the Soviet Union by expanding the total crop size – for instance, in the Ukrainian SSR alone "the amount of land planted with corn grew by 600 percent". At the height of this policy, between 1959 and 1963, one-third of Ukrainian arable land grew this crop. This policy decreased the total production of wheat and rye; Khrushchev had anticipated this, and the production of wheat and rye moved to Soviet Central Asia as part of the Virgin Lands Campaign. Khrushchev's agricultural policy failed, and in 1963 the Soviet Union had to import food from abroad. The total level of agricultural productivity in Ukraine decreased sharply during this period, but recovered in the 1970s and 1980s during Leonid Brezhnev's rule. A major role in Ukraine's agriculture during Soviet times was played by personal land plots, which were confiscated from peasant during Khrushchev's rule. Following their restoration to villagers by the late 1960s, they produced one-quarter of all vegetables and one-third of the total meat, lard, milk and fruit production, as well as more than half of all potatoes. The presence of such plots in Ukraine ameliorated the deficit of goods in the republic during the later years of Soviet rule, when rapid urbanisation produced an additional stress on agricultural producers.

In 1986 an attempt to reform Soviet agriculture was made through the introduction of Agroproms, which were tasked with controlling the production of agricultural goods. This system failed to bring results, and supply difficulties continued to increase. In March 1988 collective farmers were allowed to rent land plots for a period of up to 50 years and received control over goods produced in this way. However, local administration hindered the introduction of that reform, being supported by the majority of peasants themselves.

=== 1990s in independent Ukraine ===
At the end of the 1990s, a modernisation process took place. After the dissolution of the Soviet Union and the independence of Ukraine in 1991, former kolkhoz (kolhosp) farming collectives were abolished, and every Ukrainian citizen was granted 2 hectares of resellable land according to the Constitution of Ukraine. To prevent speculators and mafia-like businessmen from snapping up the land at a bargain price – as had happened with heavy industry – a moratorium was imposed (2002): a ban on sales of former kolhosp farmlands. As a result, agricultural lands ended up divided among 7 million Ukrainians, resulting in highly fragmented ownership. However, much of the land remained in the hands of the state. The Ukrainians mostly leased the land to new private agricultural organisations. With the loss of state support for private farmers, agriculture faced declining production figures. The already shrinking livestock population declined further, the area of agricultural land decreased and grain production fell by 50%. There was no money to invest in modern machinery. Only the cultivation of sunflowers remained stable. At the same time, farmers began to grow other crops and efficiency was increased in certain sectors.

=== Land reform after 2000 ===
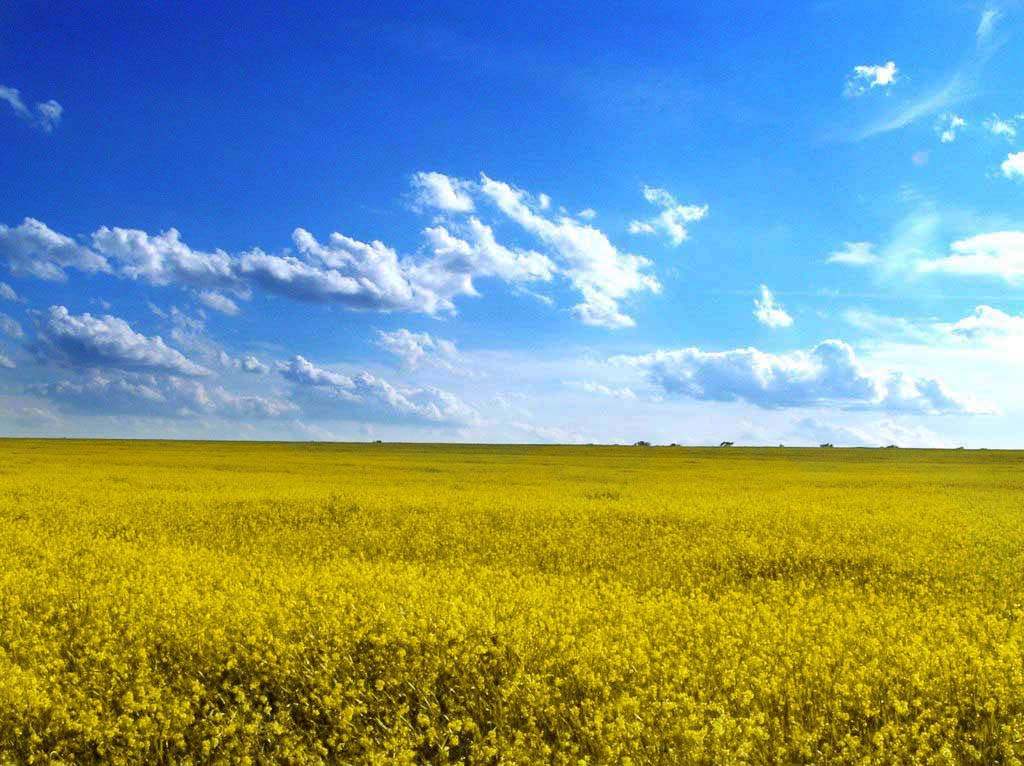
Farmlands in Odesa Oblast (2006)

After 2000, land reform in Ukraine was initiated. Due to undesirable effects of the first agricultural reform after the collapse of the Soviet Union, a moratorium on the sale of agricultural land was imposed in 2002 to put a stop to the large-scale purchase of agricultural land by oligarchs. Since at least 2011, farmland was remaining as the only major asset in Ukraine that was not privatised.

An October 2013 report by the Cabinet of Ministers of Ukraine identified the following problems in the agricultural sector, that were to be addressed in the 2013–2020 period:

- uneven development of various forms of economic activity, accompanied by a weakening of the position of medium-sized agricultural producers as a result of the creation of formally identical but unequal economic conditions for agricultural producers of different sizes and social burdens;
- lack of motivation for cooperation and consolidation of small agricultural producers within rural communities, weakening of the economic basis for the development of rural communities;
- instability of the competitive position of domestic agricultural products on foreign markets due to the incomplete process of adaptation to European requirements for quality and food safety;
- slow pace of technical and technological modernisation of production;
- risks of increased production costs due to the growing wear and tear of equipment, the prevalence of outdated technologies, and the increasing cost of non-renewable natural resources in the production cost structure of domestic agricultural products;
- losses of such products due to imperfections in the logistics system for their storage and the infrastructure of the agricultural market as a whole;
- lack of motivation among agricultural producers to comply with agro-ecological requirements;
- limited capacity of the domestic market for agricultural products, due to low purchasing power of the population;

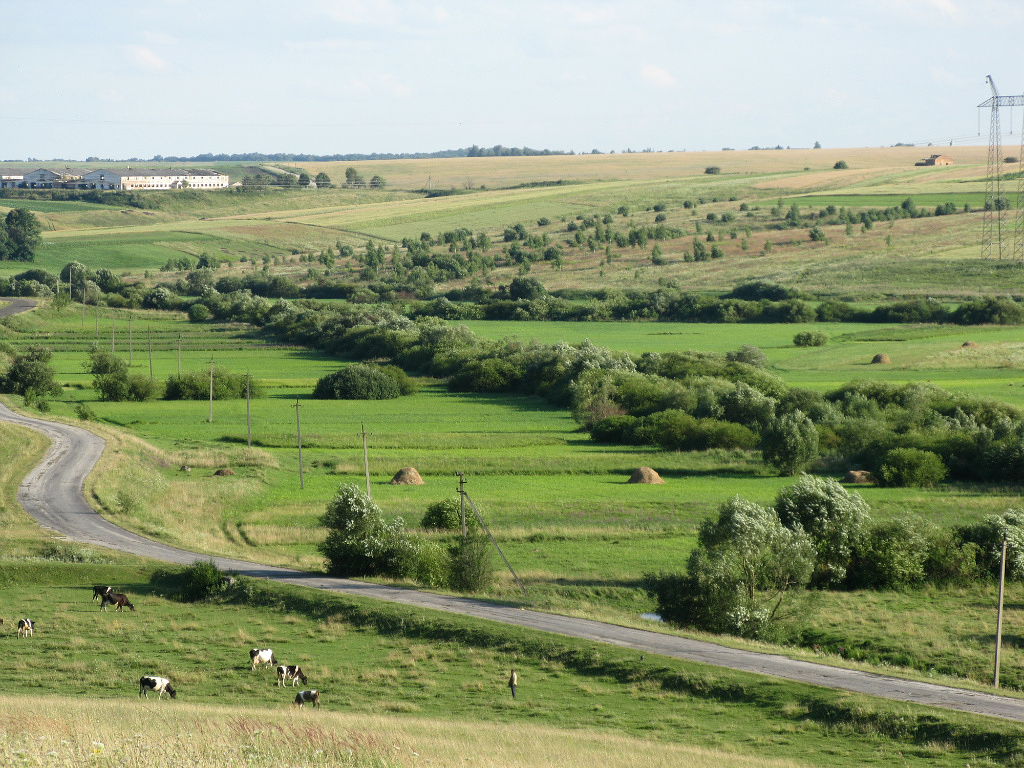
Flood-meadows with grazing cattle and haystacks in Kutyshche, Lviv Oblast (2018)

- insufficient effectiveness of self-organisation and self-regulation of the agricultural products market, difficulty for agricultural producers in developing a consolidated position on the protection of their interests;
- lack of information among a significant proportion of agricultural producers about market conditions and the conditions for doing business in the sector;
- incompleteness of land reform in Ukraine.

In March 2020, the Ukrainian parliament lifted a ban on the sale of farmland. The land market was fully opened for the first time since independence on 1 July 2021. In 2020, partly under pressure from the IMF, which would only provide funding if agriculture was reformed, it became possible again to sell agricultural land, albeit temporarily (until 1 January 2024) and subject to conditions such as a maximum size of 100 hectares. However, the 2020 reform is controversial. Meanwhile, the production of grains and oilseeds has increasingly come under the control of large agricultural companies established after 2000. The transition to a more market-oriented environment seems to have been relatively successful, but many smaller companies have disappeared or are projected to disappear. Existing smaller companies often face financial problems, which are frequently resolved by attracting an investor with market knowledge and capital. The general effect has been that farmers lost control over their businesses.

According to some researchers, by 2024 approximately 28% of agricultural land was managed by foreign investors such as NCH Capital, Vanguard Group, Kopernik Global Investors, BNP Asset Management Holding, NN Investment Partners Holdings (subsidiary of Goldman Sachs), and Norges Bank Investment Management.

=== During the Russo-Ukrainian War ===
==== Occupation of Crimea and War in Donbas (2014–2022) ====
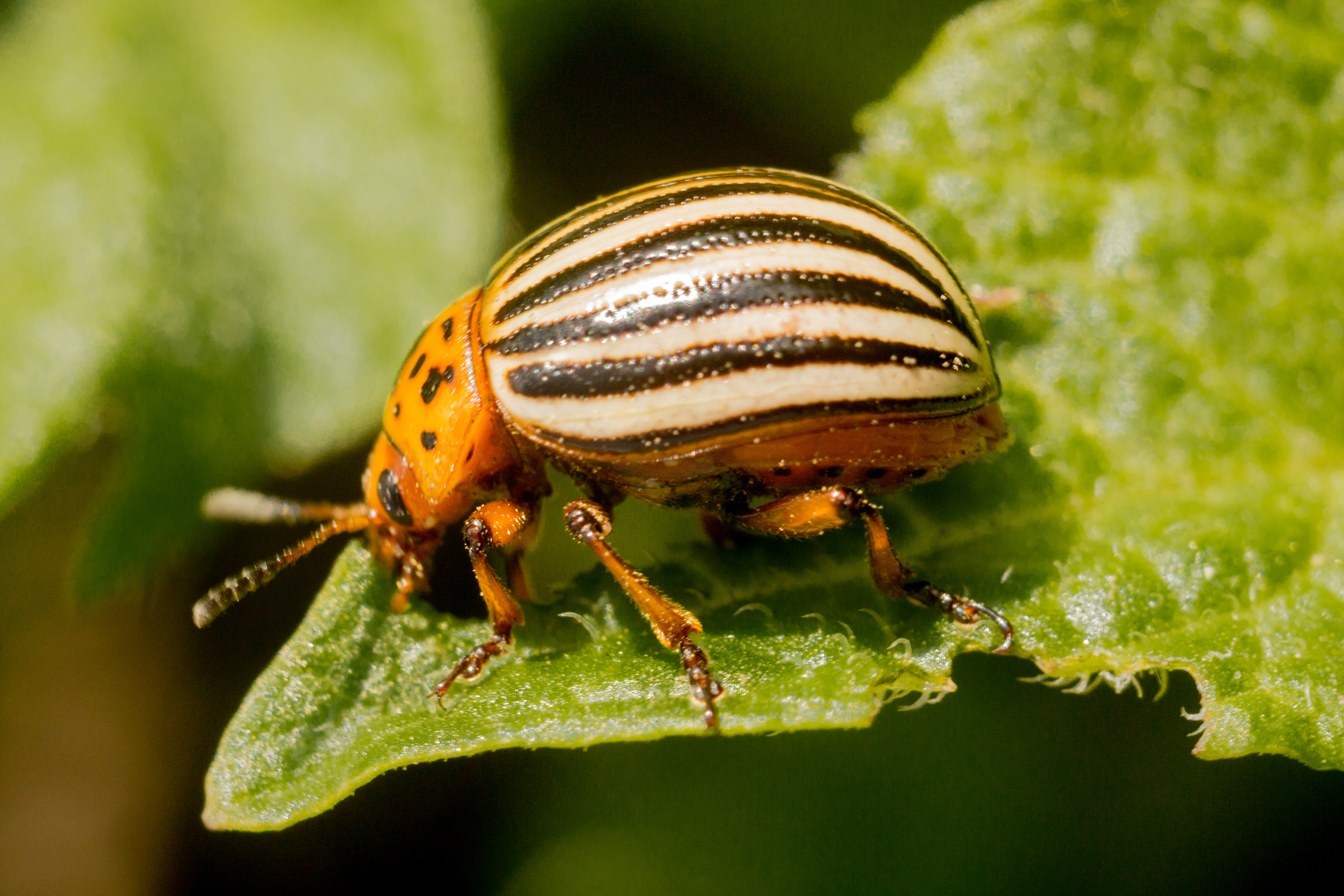
Colorado potato beetle, pictured on 11 May 2014 in Donetsk Oblast.

Since 2014, agricultural activities in Ukraine have been severely disrupted by the illegal Russian annexation of Crimea, and the subsequent outbreak of the War in Donbas, starting the Russo-Ukrainian War. Large-scale Russian theft of Ukrainian grain and other products has taken place in the Russian-occupied territories of Ukraine, while many civilians and businesses were displaced or relocated from them and areas close to the frontlines.

Around the same time, in May 2014, the Colorado potato beetle was becoming something of a plague for farmers in eastern Ukraine. During the 2014 pro-Russian unrest in Ukraine, the word kolorady, from the Ukrainian and Russian term for Colorado beetle (Ukrainian: жук колорадський, Russian: колорадский жук), gained popularity among Ukrainians as a derogatory term to describe pro-Russian separatists in the Donetsk and Luhansk Oblasts (provinces) of Eastern Ukraine. The nickname reflects the similarity of black and orange stripes on St. George's ribbons worn by many of the separatists.

==== Since the 2022 Russian invasion of Ukraine ====
Due to the 2022 Russian invasion of Ukraine, the production, processing and export of agricultural crops has declined significantly. It is estimated that maize and wheat production is approximately 20% lower than in the last year before the war, but the area that cannot be used for agricultural production varies by region. In addition to production, the storage and transport of agricultural products have also been affected by the war.

== Statistical overviews ==
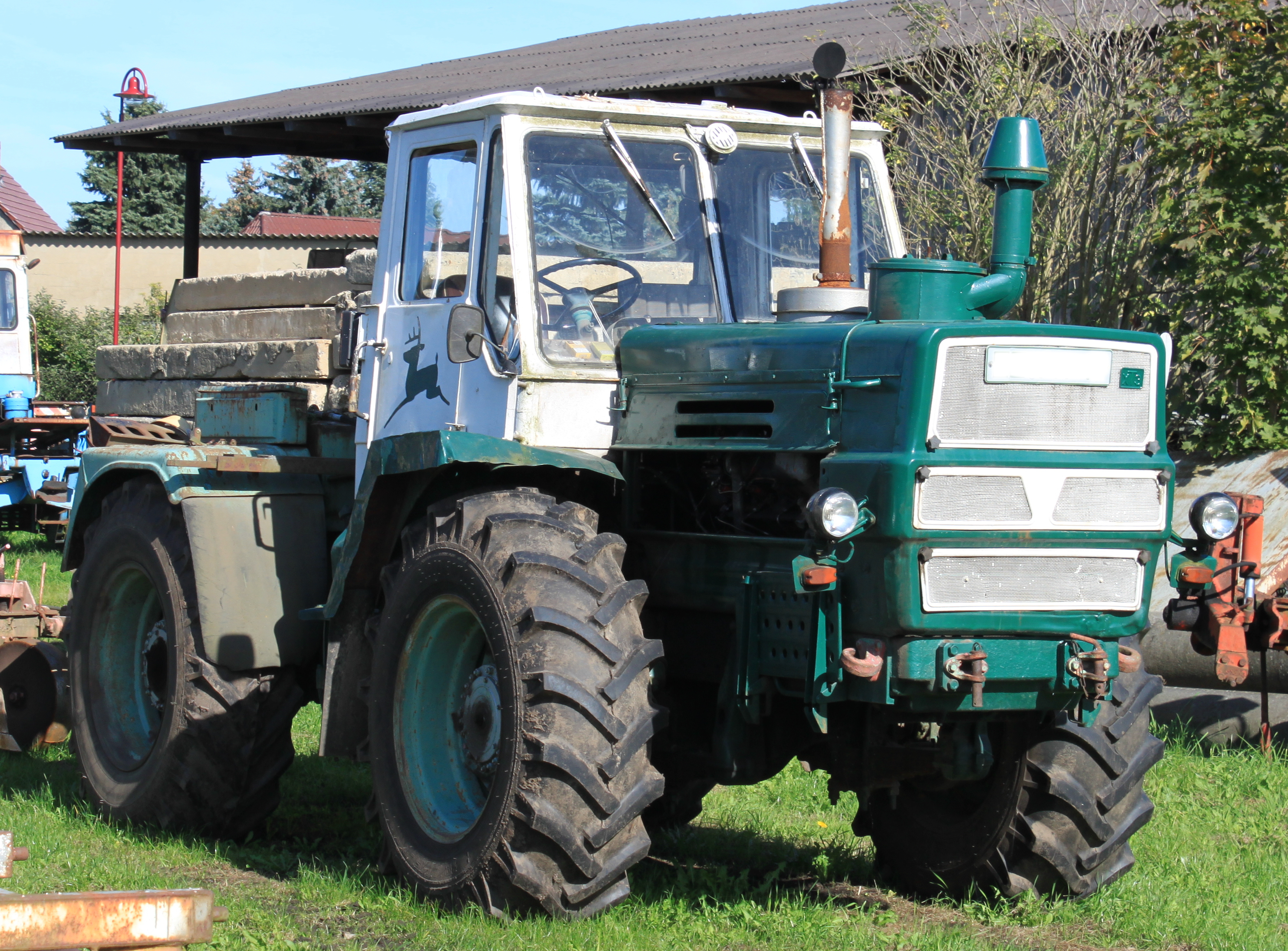
A Ukrainian T-150K tractor built by the Kharkiv Tractor Plant (2011)

=== 2000s ===
In 2008, agriculture accounted for 8.29% of Ukraine's GDP and by 2012 had grown to 10.43% of the GDP. Agriculture accounted for $13.98 billion of value added to the economy of Ukraine in 2012. Despite being a top 10 world producer of several crops such as wheat and corn Ukraine still only ranks 24 out of 112 nations measured in terms of overall agricultural production.

Professionalised, scientific breeding of barley began in 1910 and as of 2003 supplied improved cultivars to the country.

=== 2010s ===
In 2011, Ukraine was the world's largest producer of sunflower oil, a major global producer of grain and sugar, and a potential global player on meat and dairy markets. It was one of the largest producers of nuts. Ukraine produced more natural honey than any other European country and was one of the world's largest honey producers. An estimated 1.5% of its population was involved in honey production, therefore Ukraine had the highest honey per capita production rate in the world. Because Ukraine possesses 30% of the world's richest black soil, makes its agricultural industry have huge potential.

At the beginning of the 21st century, Ukraine's agricultural industry was highly profitable, generating profit margins of 40–60%. Analysts indicated that the sector had the potential to increase its output by up to four times. Ukraine was the world's 6th largest, 5th if not including the EU as a separate state, producer of corn in the world and the 3rd largest corn exporter in the world. In 2012, Ukraine signed a contract with China, the world's largest importer of corn, to supply China with 3 million tonnes of corn annually at market price. The deal included a $3 billion line of credit extension from China to Ukraine.

In 2014, Ukraine's total grain crop was estimated to be a record 64 million metric tons. In 2014, Ukraine lost control over portions of several regions to Russia, followed by the start of the war in Donbas and the annexation of Crimea by the Russian Federation, (Note: Crimea is currently under dispute by Russia and Ukraine.) hence the actual available crop yield was closer to 60.5 million metric tons. Due to the decline of the metallurgy industry, which was previously Ukraine's top export category, agricultural products have become Ukraine's largest export category as a result of the war in Donbas.

Agricultural output of Ukraine since 1961, in 2015 US$

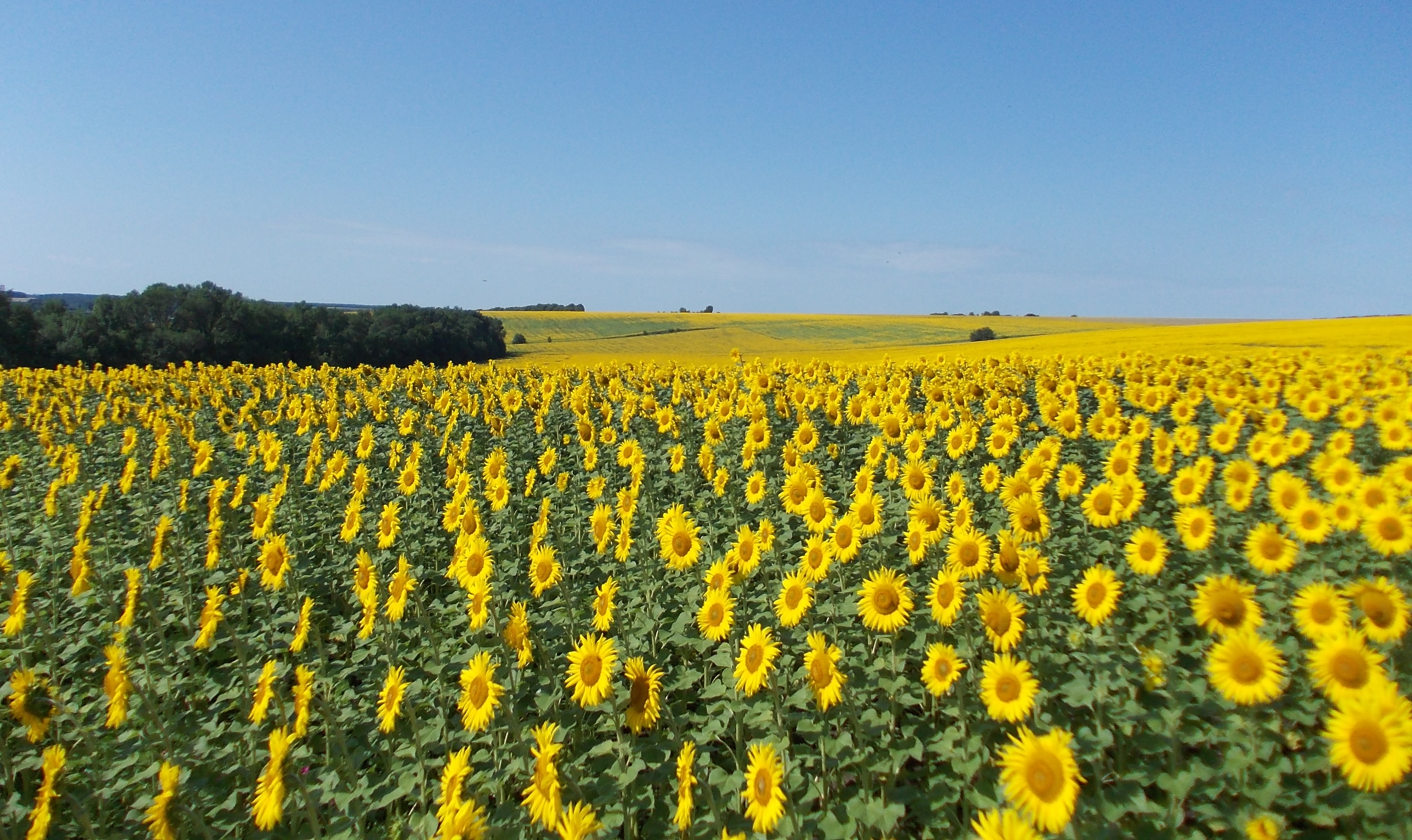
Sunflower field in Poltava Oblast (2015)

The Ministry of Agrarian Policy and Food of Ukraine reported that in 2016, Ukraine harvested its largest grain crop since independence — 66 million tonnes. The 2015 figure was exceeded by almost 6 million tonnes. In 2016, record grain yields were also set: wheat — 42.1 centners per hectare, rye — 27.3 centners per hectare, maize — 66 centners per hectare, peas — 31.3 centners per hectare.

=== 2018 ===
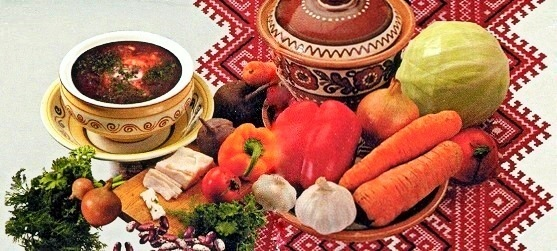
Main ingredients of Ukrainian borscht: beetroots, cabbage, carrots, tomatoes, bell peppers, beans, onions, garlic, salo (cured pork fatback), parsley, dill. (detail from a 2005 Ukrainian postage stamp)

In 2018:

- It was the 5th largest world producer of maize (35.8 million metric tons (35,200,000 long tons; 39,500,000 short tons)), after the U.S., China, Brazil, and Argentina;
- It was the 8th largest world producer of wheat (24.6 million metric tons (24,200,000 long tons; 27,100,000 short tons));
- It was the 3rd largest world producer of potatoes (22.5 million metric tons (22,100,000 long tons; 24,800,000 short tons)), second only to China and India;
- It was the world's largest producer of sunflower seed (14.1 million metric tons (13,900,000 long tons; 15,500,000 short tons));
- It was the 7th largest world producer of sugar beets (13.9 million metric tons (13,700,000 long tons; 15,300,000 short tons)), which is used to produce sugar and ethanol;
- It was the 7th largest world producer of barley (7.3 million metric tons (7,200,000 long tons; 8,000,000 short tons));
- It was the 7th largest world producer of rapeseed (2.7 million metric tons (2,700,000 long tons; 3,000,000 short tons));
- It was the 13th largest world producer of tomatoes (2.3 million metric tons (2,300,000 long tons; 2,500,000 short tons));
- It was the 5th largest world producer of cabbage (1.6 million metric tons (1,600,000 long tons; 1,800,000 short tons)), after China, India, South Korea, and Russia;
- It was the 11th largest world producer of apples (1.4 million metric tons (1,400,000 long tons; 1,500,000 short tons));
- It was the 3rd largest world producer of pumpkins (1.3 million metric tons (1,300,000 long tons; 1,400,000 short tons)), second only to China and India;
- It was the 6th largest world producer of cucumbers (985 thousand metric tons (969,000 long tons; 1,086,000 short tons));
- It was the 5th largest world producer of carrots (841 thousand metric tons (828,000 long tons; 927,000 short tons)), after China, Uzbekistan, the U.S., and Russia;
- It was the 4th largest world producer of dry peas (775 thousand metric tons (763,000 long tons; 854,000 short tons)), second only to Canada, Russia, and China;
- It was the 7th largest world producer of rye (393 thousand metric tons (387,000 long tons; 433,000 short tons));
- It was the 3rd largest world producer of buckwheat (137 thousand metric tons (135,000 long tons; 151,000 short tons)), second only to China and Russia;
- It was the 6th largest world producer of walnuts (127 thousand metric tons (125,000 long tons; 140,000 short tons));
- It produced 4.4 million metric tons (4,300,000 long tons; 4,900,000 short tons) of soy;
- It produced 883 thousand metric tons (869,000 long tons; 973,000 short tons) of onions;
- It produced 467 thousand metric tons (460,000 long tons; 515,000 short tons) of grapes;
- It produced 418 thousand metric tons (411,000 long tons; 461,000 short tons) of oats;
- It produced 396 thousand metric tons (390,000 long tons; 437,000 short tons) of watermelons;
- It produced 300 thousand metric tons (300,000 long tons; 330,000 short tons) of cherries;

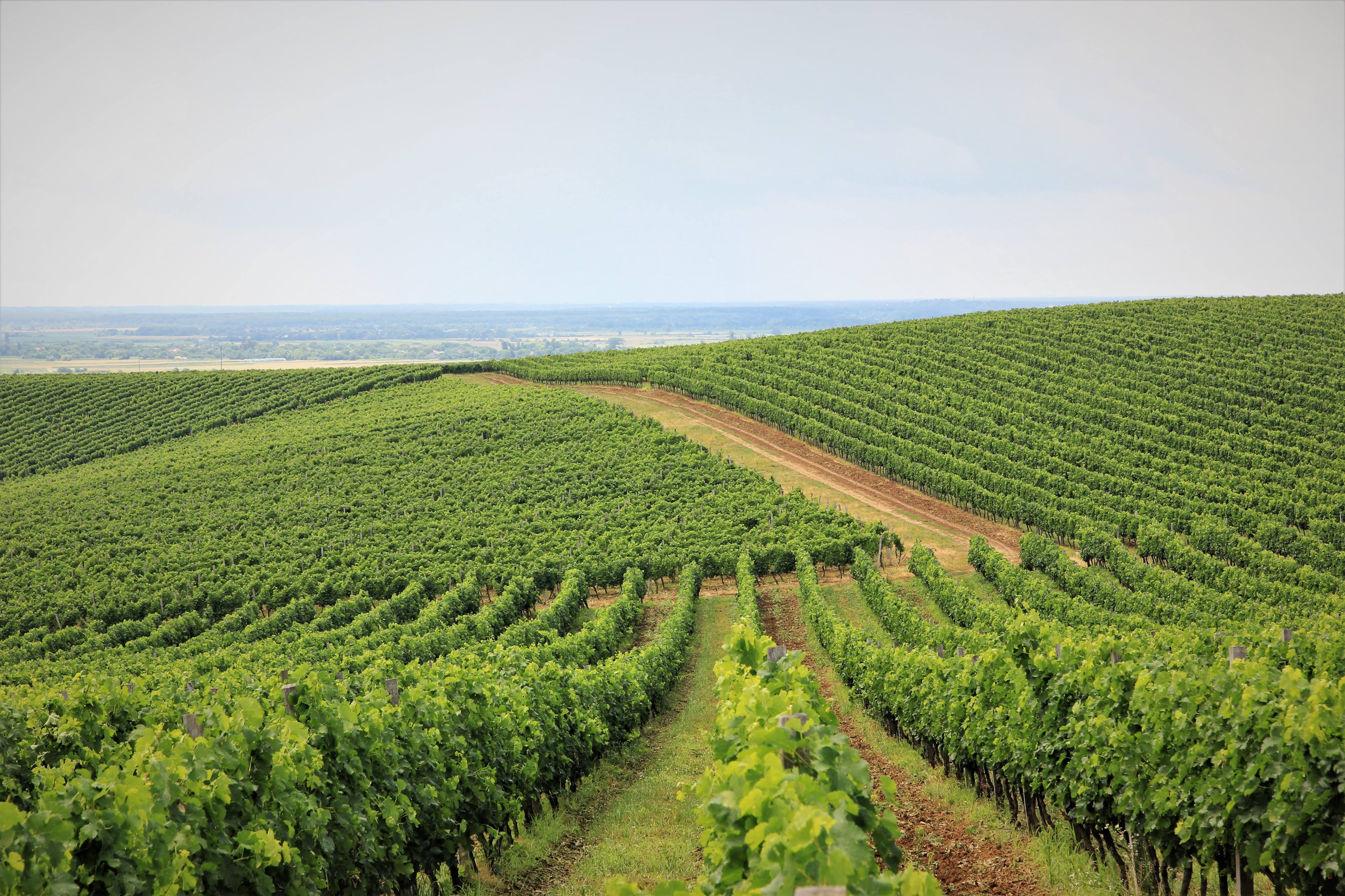
Vineyards in Zakarpattia Oblast (2019)

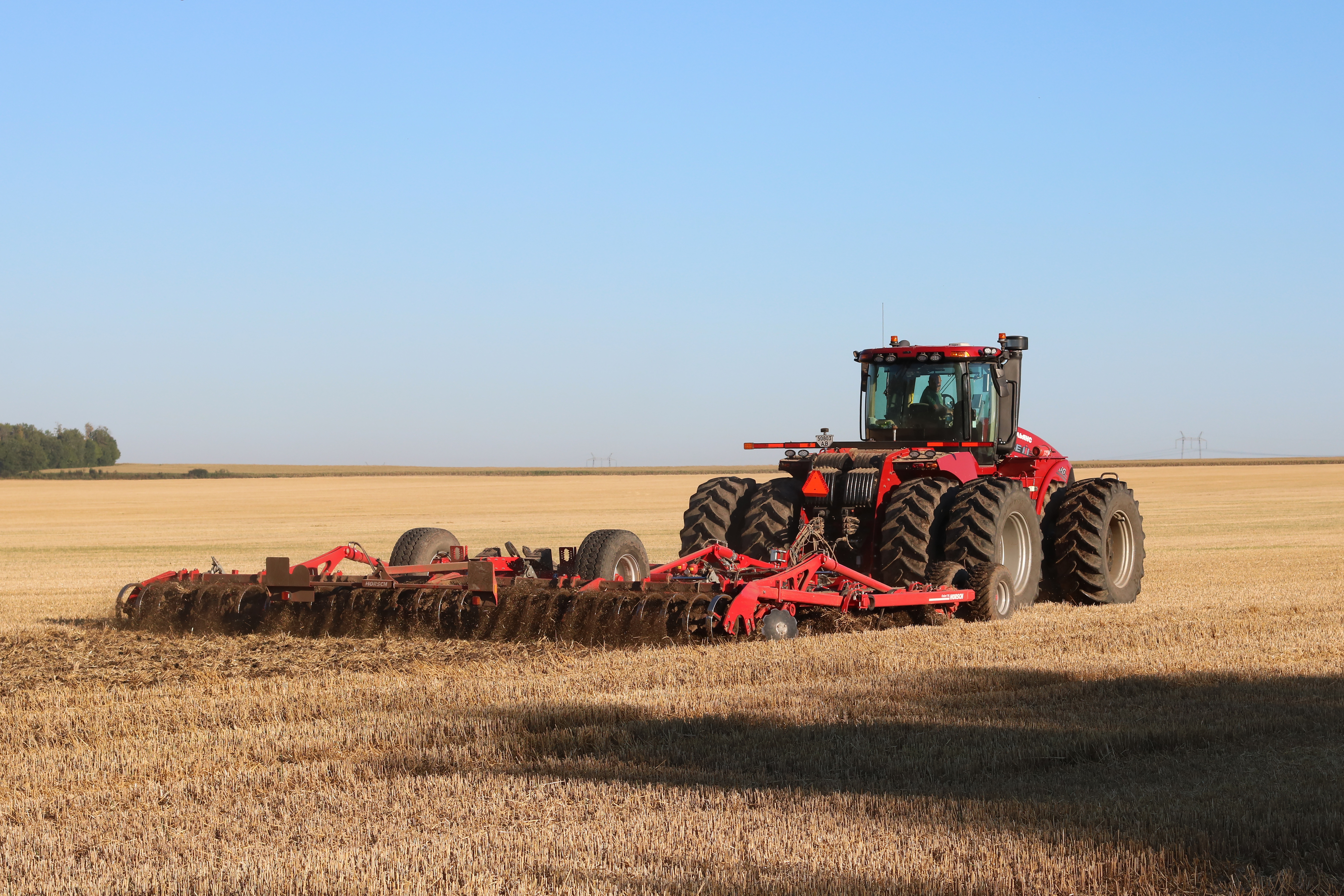
Plowing in Vinnytsia Oblast (2026)

in addition to smaller productions of other agricultural products. According to government data, as of 2018, the agricultural sector accounts for almost 17% of Ukraine's GDP and generates almost 38% of foreign exchange earnings. By compasiosn: in 2010, agriculture accounted for 8.2% of Ukraine's GDP, and agricultural products accounted for 14.5% of total exports. The agricultural sector employed 15.8% of all workers.

=== 2023 ===
As of 10 November 2023, 71.5 million tonnes of oilseeds and grains have already been harvested in Ukraine during the harvest campaign.

Grain and legumes were harvested on an area of 9.84 million hectares with a yield of 52.1 centners per hectare, including:

- 22.409 million tonnes of wheat;
- 21 million 218 thousand tonnes of corn were harvested;
- 5 million 890 thousand tonnes of barley were harvested;
- 398.2 thousand tonnes of peas were harvested;
- buckwheat harvested 206.7 thousand tonnes;
- millet harvested 178.9 thousand tonnes;
- other cereals and legumes harvested 974.1 thousand tonnes.

As indicated, oilseeds were harvested on an area of 8,096 thousand hectares, yielding 20.2 million tonnes, of which:

- 11 million 520 thousand tonnes of sunflower seeds were harvested;
- 4 million 713.2 thousand tonnes of soybeans were harvested;
- rapeseed harvesting was completed, with 4,005 thousand tonnes of seeds harvested (with a yield of 28.7 centners per hectare).

10,098,700 tonnes of sugar beet were harvested, with a yield of 477.9 centners per hectare. According to a report by the Ministry of Agrarian Policy and Food of Ukraine, as of the third week of December 2023, Ukraine had harvested 78.7 million tonnes of new crops, including 57 million tonnes of grain million 859 thousand tonnes of cereals and 20 million 759 thousand tonnes of oilseeds.

=== 2024 ===
As of the end of May 2024, according to a statement by the State Secretary of the Ministry of Agrarian Policy and Food of Ukraine, as a result of full-scale war, about 30% of the total potential of the agricultural sector was destroyed, and almost 20% of agricultural land was occupied. In general, in the two years since the start of the full-scale invasion, Ukraine's agricultural sector has suffered direct losses of more than US$10 billion.

In 2024, Ukraine reached its pre-war export levels of $24.5 billion, which accounted for 59% of total exports, according to a January 2025 Ministry of Agrarian Policy report. In total, Ukraine exported 78.3 million tonnes of agricultural products in 2024. For comparison: in 2021, a historic record was set for agricultural exports, reaching $27.7 billion.

== See also ==
- Organic market in Ukraine
- Victory gardens in Ukraine
- Sheep farming in Ukraine

== Bibliography ==
- Carter, Joseph Coleman; Crawford, Melba; Lehman, Paul; Nikolaenko, Galina; Trelogan, Jessica (2000). "The Chora of Chersonesos in Crimea, Ukraine". American Journal of Archaeology. 104 (4). Archaeological Institute of America: 707–741. ISSN 0002-9114. JSTOR 507154.
- Hryniuk, Stella (1985). "Peasant Agriculture in East Galicia in the Late Nineteenth Century". The Slavonic and East European Review. 63 (2). Modern Humanities Research Association: 228–243. ISSN 0037-6795. JSTOR 4209083.
- Magocsi, Paul R. (1996). A History of Ukraine. Toronto: University of Toronto Press. ISBN 0-8020-0830-5.
- Martin, Janet (2007). Medieval Russia: 980–1584. Second Edition. E-book. Cambridge: Cambridge University Press. ISBN 978-0-511-36800-4.
- World Data Center
- Кульчицький, Станіслав (2013). Червоний виклик. Історія комунізму в Україні від його народження до загибелі. Vol. 2. Kyiv: Tempora. ISBN 9786175691663.
