= Winemaking in Crimea =

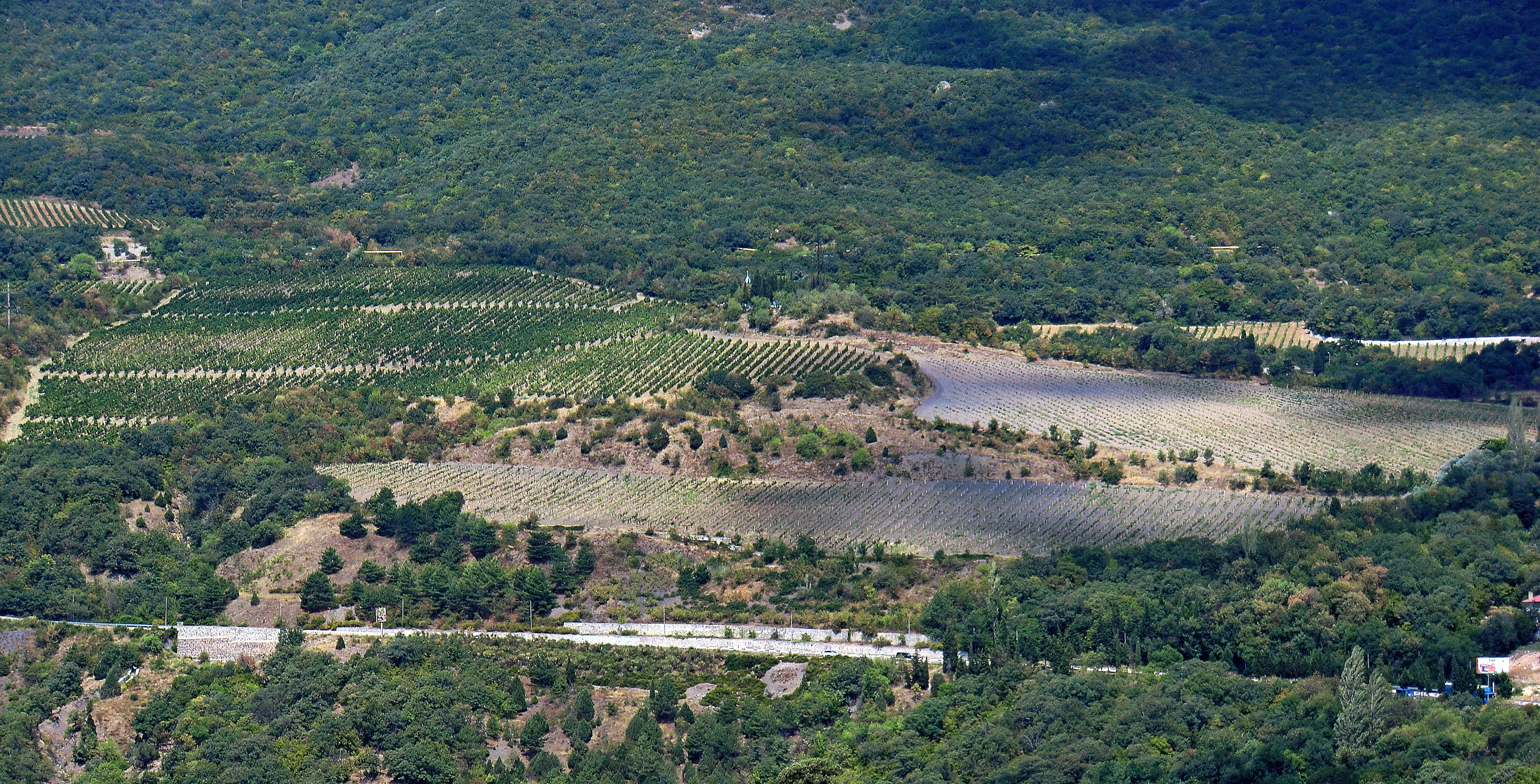
Livadiya vineyards

Winemaking in Crimea has existed since classical antiquity. The inhabitants of Crimea have engaged in viticulture for more than two thousand years, from Ancient Greek colonization through the Ottoman Empire and to the present day.

== History ==
=== Early history ===
The early colonists of Chersonesus imported wine from Heraclea Pontica whose quality was highly regarded. Starting from its origins circa the fifth century BCE, viticulture developed into one of the most profitable economic ventures in the Greek cities of Pontica, with vineyards established in the western Crimea and on the Heraclaeum peninsula near Chersonesus.

South Pontic wine continued to be imported by the Bosporan Kingdom, although relative economic stability in the second and third centuries allowed domestic amphorae manufacture and wine exports to compete with South Pontic wine. In the Genoese colonies of the Crimea, the vineyards of Soldaïa and Gothia paid a tax called the embelopaticum (Greek: αμπελόπακτον).

Under the governance of the Ottoman Empire, winemaking continued in the Crimea and other regions with significant viticulture production despite Islamic restrictions on alcohol, with wine often being officially taxed as grape juice (şıra) for legal reasons. Halenko determined from tax records that Kefe Eyalet produced comparable amounts of wine under Ottoman rule as the Crimea did later under Russian rule, with improvements in output attributable to agricultural improvements and the cultivation of new vineyards.

=== Russia and the Soviet Union ===
You want to buy an estate on the south shore of Crimea? Mercy, for what reason am I asking such a question? Who does not yet know that Crimean estates are unprofitable and lead to ruin?

— Iakov Bank, O primenenii novogo sposoba razvedeniia vinogradnikov v razstilku (en chaintres) k mestnym usloviiam iuzhnogo berega Kryma (1885)

The Prussian botanist Peter Simon Pallas produced an early sparkling wine at his Crimean estate circa 1799. Russian authors viewed Mikhail Vorontsov's promotion of winemaking in New Russia as the beginning of the modern Crimean wine industry, dismissing the experience of the Crimean Tatars as primitive and inefficient. The Nikitsky Botanical Garden began crossing grape varietals in the 1830s and 1840s, focusing largely on European varietals over Crimea's indigenous grapes. In 1878, Lev Golitsyn founded the Novyi Svit winery in Crimea near Sudak and began extensively cultivating vineyards for sparkling wines. Strict quarantine allowed Crimea to largely avoid issues related to the spread of phylloxera in the 1800s.

World War I brought challenges to the Russian wine industry, with a nominal prohibition on the sale on alcohol in 1914 and disruptions to the supply of the fungicide copper sulphate damaging the wine industry. Crimean wines in particular faced a dilution of their branding, as late Imperial Russian merchants began blending Crimean wines with less expensive wines to maximize profit. In 1920, the de jure prohibition on retail sale of wine was officially lifted (unlike vodka which was officially prohibited until 1925), with the Commissariat of Agriculture establishing a Winemaking Administration to promote best practices.

The Magarach Institute, a center of viticultural research, was evacuated to Tashkent during World War II, and after the war was re-established in Yalta with equipment liberated from the Soviet occupation zone in Germany. Bottles from Massandra and Magarach won medals at the 1955 First International Wine Competition in Ljubljana. In the 1960s, the phylloxera quarantine failed after a century and Crimean vineyards began suffering from infestation, with 19,000 hectares of Crimean vineyards dying between 1962 and 1976. During his 1971 viticultural tour of the Soviet Union, Maynard Amerine assessed Soviet wines highly unfavorably in terms of quality, but was impressed with a Muscat from Magarach, which he assigned a 17.5 on the Davis scale.

Soviet wine production was damaged by a second round of anti-alcohol government restrictions, this time starting in 1985 under Mikhail Gorbachev, such that as late as 1990 attendees at the Seventieth General Assembly of the International Organization of Vine and Wine held in Yalta "found a city devoid of wine."

== Current situation ==
Crimean wine production collapsed in the 1990s and early 2000s as land formerly dedicated to vineyards were developed, with winemaking largely shifting to previously disfavored sites around Bakhchysarai. Crimean winemakers have been forced to reorient from the Ukrainian to the Russian market following the annexation of Crimea by the Russian Federation, a process made more difficult by the requirement to adhere to the new regulatory framework of Russia.

== See also ==
- Russian wine
- Ukrainian wine
- Ukrainian cuisine
- Sovetskoye Shampanskoye

== Bibliography ==
Articles

- Balard, Michel (1995). "The Greeks of Crimea under Genoese Rule in the XIVth and XVth Centuries". Dumbarton Oaks Papers. 49: 23–32. doi:10.2307/1291706. JSTOR 1291706.
- Halenko, Oleksander (2004). "Wine Production, Marketing and Consumption in the Ottoman Crimea, 1520-1542". Journal of the Economic and Social History of the Orient. 47 (4): 507–547. JSTOR 25165072.

Books

- Bittner, Stephen V. (2021). Whites and Reds: A History of Wine in the Lands of Tsar and Commissar. Oxford University Press. doi:10.1093/oso/9780198784821.001.0001. ISBN 978-0-19-182712-9.
- Dolukhanov, Pavel M. (1996). The Early Slavs: Eastern Europe from the Initial Settlement to the Kievan Rus. London and New York: Longman. ISBN 0-582-23627-4.
- Saprykin, Sergey Yu (1997). Heracleia Pontica and Tauric Chersonesus before Roman domination: (VI–I centuries B.C.). Amsterdam: A.M. Hakkert. ISBN 90-256-1109-5.
- Saprykin, Sergey Yu (2017). "Overseas Trade in the Black Sea Region and the Formation of the Pontic Market from the First Century BCE to the Third Century CE". In Kozlovskaya, Valeriya (ed.). The Northern Black Sea in Antiquity: Networks, Connectivity, and Cultural Interactions. Cambridge University Press. p. 132. doi:10.1017/9781139094702. ISBN 978-1-107-01951-5. LCCN 2017003094.

Webpages

- "Виноделы Крыма просят время на переход на российские стандарты". InvestTalk (in Russian). 18 October 2014. Archived from the original on 25 December 2014.
