= Winemaking in Russia =

Wine making in Russia

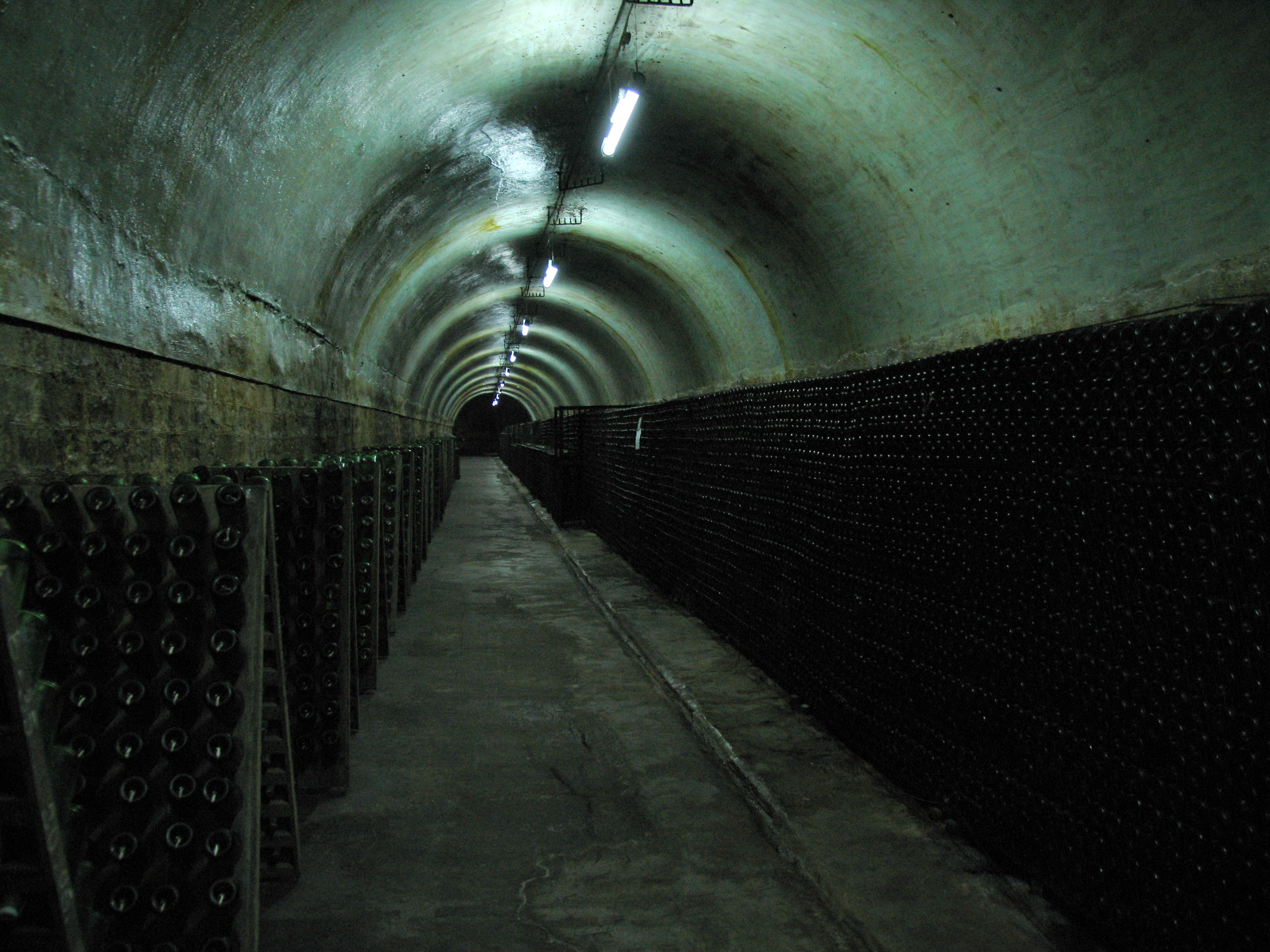
Cellar in the Abrau-Durso winery, near Novorossiysk

The vast majority of Russia's territory is unsuitable for grape growing, with most of the production concentrated in parts of Krasnodar and Rostov regions, as well as the occupied Ukrainian territory of Crimea.

As of 2017, the Russian market is characterized by the presence of many low-cost products, with a significant part of local wines having a retail price of less than 100 rubles ($1.71). Attempts to shift away from the low-quality reputation of Soviet wines has been moderately successful, though 80% of wines sold in Russia in 2013 were made from grape concentrates.

In 2014 Russia was ranked 11th worldwide by the area of vineyards under cultivation. The Russian wine industry is promoted by local authorities as a healthier alternative to spirits, which have a higher alcohol content.

== History ==
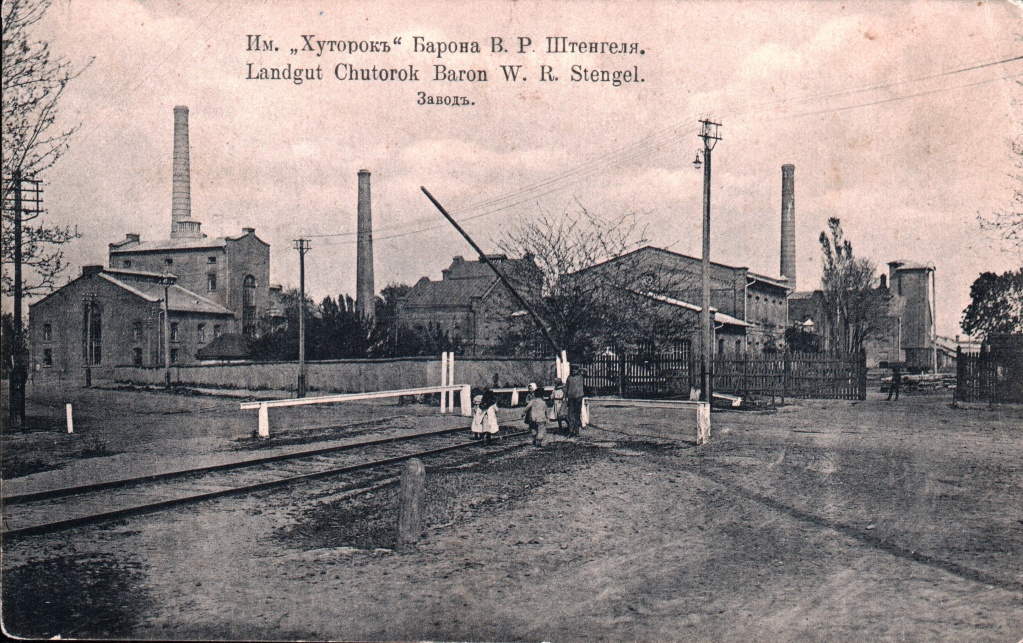
Khutorok Winery in Kuban, 1910

Wild grape vines have grown around the Caspian, Black and Azov seas for thousands of years with evidence of viticulture and cultivation for trade with the Ancient Greeks found along the shores of the Black Sea at Phanagoria and Gorgippia. It is claimed that the Black Sea area is the world's oldest wine region.

The founder of modern commercial wine-making in Russia was Prince Lev Golitsyn (1845-1915), who established the first Russian factory of champagne wines at his Crimean estate of Novyi Svet.

After the Russian Revolution of 1917 the French wine-savvy professionals fled Russia, but the industry was gradually reestablished, starting from 1920. According to Denis Puzyrev, before the 1917 Revolution wine was drunk in Russia only by the aristocracy, a situation that only changed under Soviet rule. The wine industry experienced a rebound in the 1940s and 1950s during the Soviet era until the domestic reforms pushed by Mikhail Gorbachev in 1985 as part of his campaign against alcoholism. After the fall of the Soviet Union, the transition to a market economy with the privatization of land saw many of the area's prime vineyard spaces being utilized for other purposes. By 2000 the entire Russian Federation had only 72,000 hectares (180,000 acres) under cultivation, less than half the total area used in the early 1980s.

Semi-sweet and sweet wines account for 80% of the Russian market, a share exceeding 90% in the economy segment. Since 2006, Russian wineries have adopted European techniques and standards. The Abrau-Durso winery is considered the flagship of the new wine industry.

In 2018 and 2019 several Russian wines were rated by Robert Parker of The Wine Advocate and scored between 80 and 97 points.

In 2020 Fanagoria Blanc de Blancs Brut, a 2017 wine from the Fanagoria Estate Winery in Fanagoria on the Taman Peninsula, was awarded a gold medal at the "Chardonnay du Monde" ("Chardonnay of the World") international tasting competition.

Since 2020, wine has almost doubled in price, due to an increase in excise.

The "Law on Viticulture and Winemaking" in the Russian Federation entered into force on June 26, 2020; the document enshrines 80 basic concepts for the field of viticulture and winemaking, among them "wine", "fortified wine", "sparkling wine", "grape planting", etc. The bill also defines that products designated as "Russian wine" must be produced exclusively from grapes grown in the country.

== Geography and climate ==
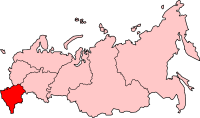
North Caucasus in Russia

The climate of the North Caucasus region, where most of Russia's vineyards are located, is typical of a continental region. To counter the severe winters many vine growers will cover their vines over with soil to protect the vines from frost. In the area of Krasnodar there are anywhere from 193 to 233 frost free days during the growing seasons that allow the vines in the area to grow to full ripening.

The area of Dagestan has a varied climate with some areas semi-desert. About 13 percent of Russian wine is produced in the area around Stavropol which has 180-190 frost free days. The region of Rostov is characterized by its hot, dry summers and severe winters which produces grapes in lower yields than other parts of the country. Nevertheless Rostov is a region with a great diversity of autochthonous grape varieties which originally from the Don Valley including such az Tsimlyankskiy Tchernyi, Kumshatskiy, Krasnostop Zolotovskiy, Plechistik and others.

== Wine and grapes ==
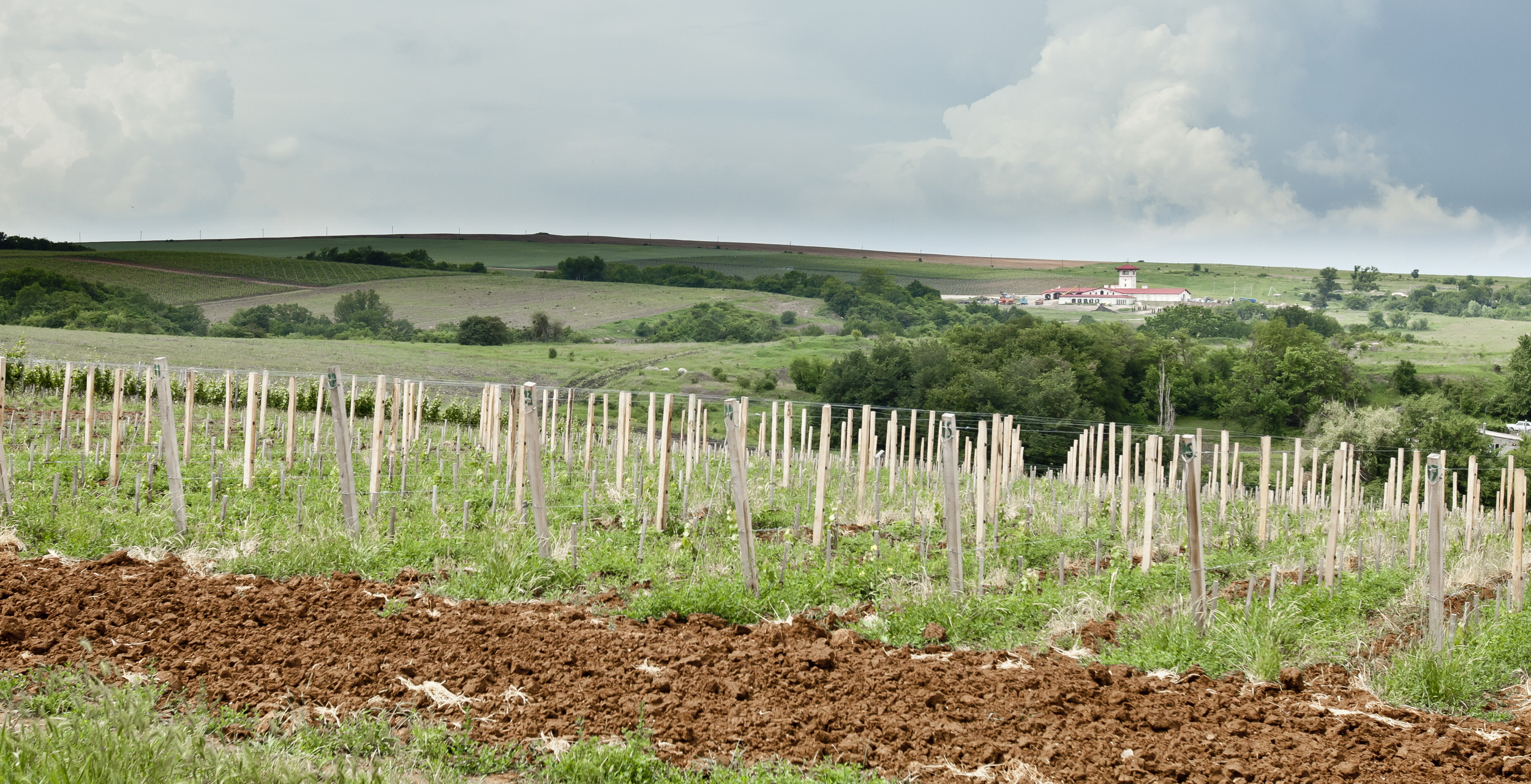
Lefkadia vineyards

Russia produces wine of several different styles including still, sparkling and dessert wine. Currently there are over 100 different varieties of grapes used in the production of Russian wine. The Rkatsiteli grape accounts for over 45 percent of production. Other varieties grown include Aligote, Cabernet Sauvignon, Cabernet Severny, Clairette blanche, Merlot, Muscat, Pinot gris, Plavai, Portugieser, Riesling, Saperavi, Silvaner, Traminer, and Golubok.

Russia currently has the following controlled appellations that correspond to the sorts of grapes: Sibirkovy (Russian: Сибирьковый), Tsimlyanski Cherny (Russian: Цимлянский чёрный), Plechistik (Russian: Плечистик), Narma (Russian: Нарма), and Güliabi Dagestanski (Russian: Гюляби Дагестанский), Krasnostop Zolotovsky (Russian: Красностоп Золотовский), Saperavi (Russian: Саперави), Platovsky (Russian: Платовский), Bastardo Magarachsky (Russian: Бастардо Магарачский), Kefesia (Russian: Кефесия), Kokur Belyi (Russian: Кокур Белый).

A Russian wine guide published in 2012 lists 55 wines from 13 wineries, including names such as Fanagoria, Lefkadia, Chateau du Talus, Abrau-Durso, Chateau le Grand Vostock. The market is largely fragmented, and even the market share of leading producers (such as Kuban-Vino or Viktoria TD) is below 3%.

== See also ==
- Russian cuisine
- Sovetskoye Shampanskoye
- Ukrainian wine
- Winemaking in Crimea
- Winemaking
- Agriculture in Russia
