= Ukrainian wine =

Wine making in Ukraine

Location of Ukraine

The wine industry of Ukraine is well-established with long traditions. Several brands of wine from Ukraine are exported to bordering countries, the European Union, and North America. Amid the 2022 Russian invasion of Ukraine Ukrainian winemakers continued to work and produce wine.

The regions of wine industry in Ukraine corresponds to its viticulture regions situated predominantly in close vicinity to Black Sea coast in Southern Ukraine as well as around Tisza valley of Zakarpattia Oblast.

== History ==
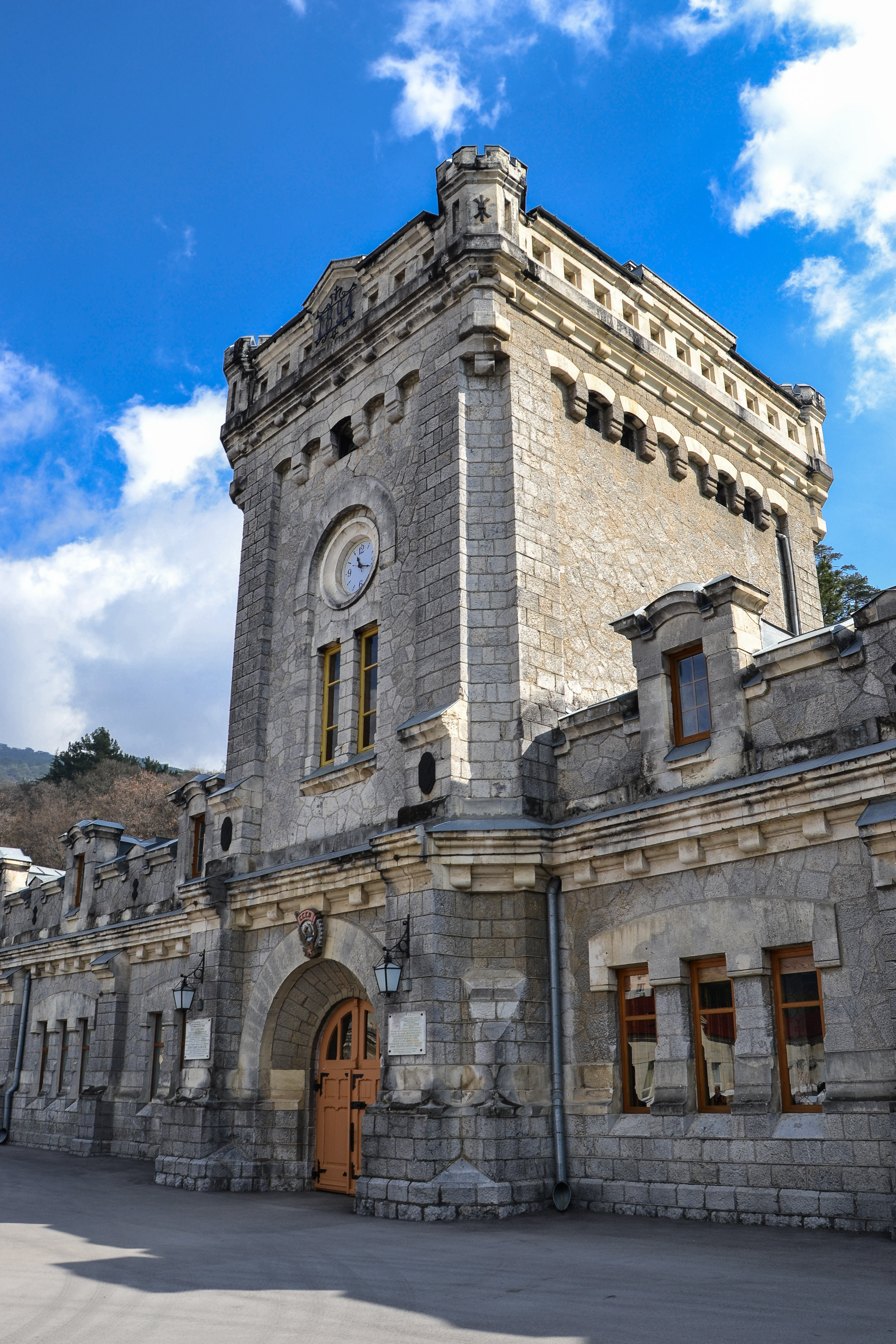
Massandra winery

A wine culture existed in today's Ukraine already in the 4th century BC at the south coast of the Crimea. Presses and amphoras were found from this period. Wine cultivation in the northern part of the country (around Kyiv and Chernihiv) however only started in the 11th century by monks. According to Ivan Krypiakevych, imported wine from Greece was a popular drink among wealthy inhabitants of the Principality of Galicia. After establishing control over Mukachevo, prince Leo of Galicia introduced tax exemptions for Italian and German colonists in the area, who had been invited by his father-in-law Béla IV of Hungary in order to develop viticulture.

During the 16th and 17th centuries, Lviv served as a major centre of wine production in the Kingdom of Poland. According to Gruneweg, local wines were sometimes not inferior to ones imported from Moldavia, Hungary and Greece. The existence of vineyards in Lviv and its surroundings was testified in the records of Bartholomew Zimorowic and Denys Zubrytskyi.

During the Hetmanate era in the 17-18th centuries, viticulture was practiced by monks of the Kyiv Pechersk Lavra and other monasteries of Kyiv, and wineyards were also present in courts of many burghers. Grapes were also cultivated in Mhar Monastery and in Poltava. Balkan and Greek settlers also brought their own varieties of grapes into Ukraine. However, grapes from Ukrainian territories were generally not suitable for winemaking, and were normally consumed as food. Most of the wine was imported from the lands of the Ottoman Empire and its vassals in Wallachia and Crimea.

In Crimea, wine cultivation developed in the southern part of the peninsula under the rule of Byzantine Empire and Genoese Republic. Under Empress Catherine the Great (1729–1796) in 1783 Crimea became a part of the Russian Empire. Count Mikhail Vorontsov planted the first wine gardens in 1820 and established a large winery near Yalta. The viticulture research institute Magarach was founded then in 1828. The founder of the famous sparkling wines is prince Lev Golitsyn, who for the first time manufactured Russian "Champagner" after the Crimean War (1854 to 1856) on his property Novyi Svit near Yalta. Later, under the last Tsar Nicholas II (1868–1918) the predecessor of Massandra, today's state winery, was founded.

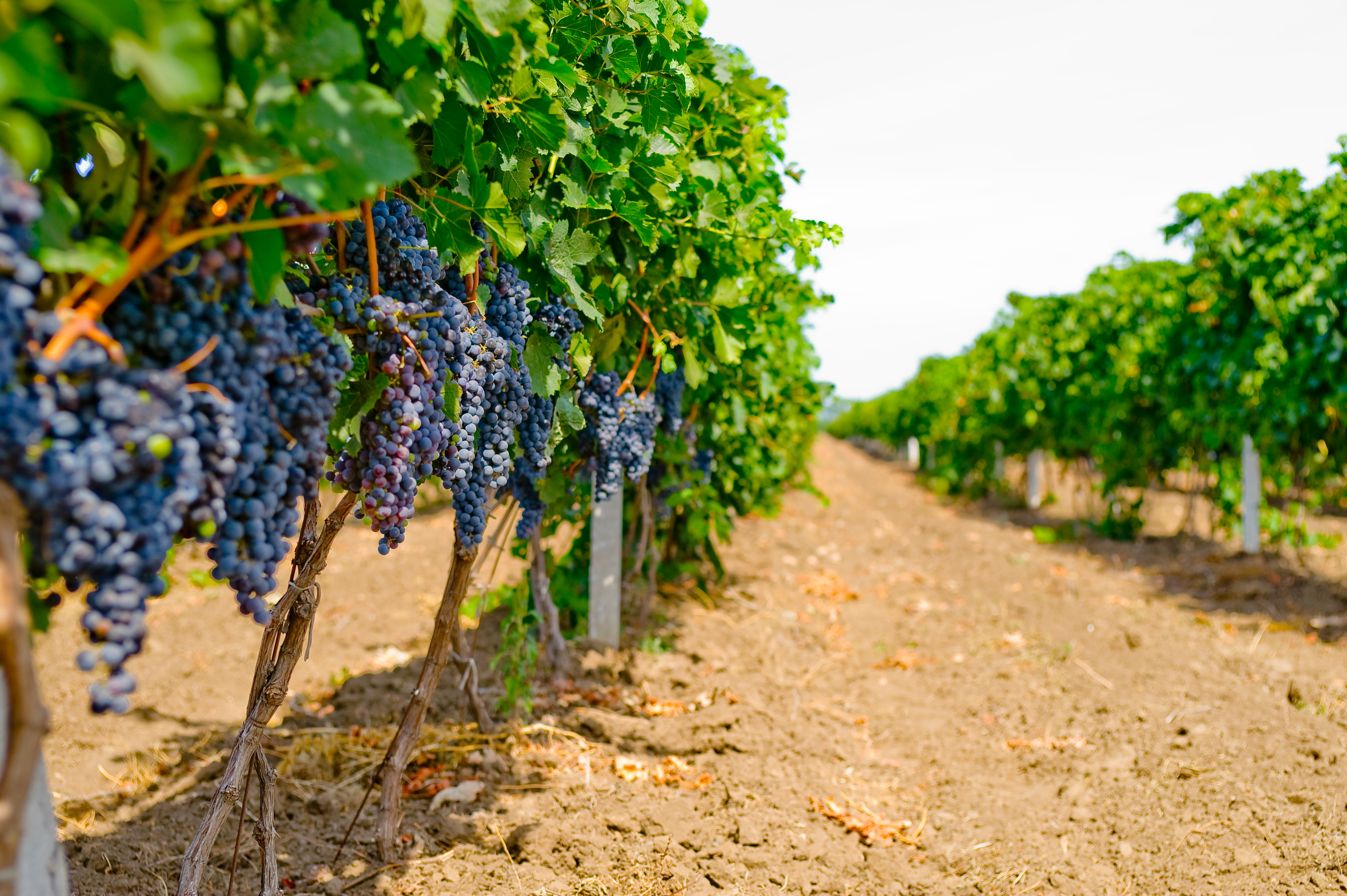
Wineyards in Shabo, Odesa Oblast

In the Steppe regions of Ukraine and eastern parts of Podolia winemaking was introduced starting from the late 18th century by settlers from Bessarabia, as well as Bulgarian and German colonists. In 1822, with the approval of Tsar Alexander I, Swiss winegrowers from the canton Vaud established a colony at Shabo (French: Chabag). They later founded daughter colonies on the Dnieper and in Crimea. Wine from Chabag was displayed at the 1893 World's Columbian Exposition in Chicago and received a medal of recognition. However, during the late 19th century a major part of wineyards was destroyed by phylloxera, necessitating introduction of new sorts. By 1920, 90% of wineyards in Ukraine belonged to small-scale private owners. Between the 1890s and 1914 the area of vine cultivation in Ukraine grew from 33,000 to 47,000 hectares. Following a decline as a result of the First World War and Revolution of 1917-1920, by the late 1920s viticulture revived, but suffered a new blow due to collectivization. As a result of government policies, by 1940 the area of wineyards in Ukrainian SSR had increased to 72,000 hectares, however harvest per hectare didn't grow as compared to 1914.

Following severe decline as a result of the Second World War, viticulture in Ukraine revived, with grape cultivation spreading to the Donbas and reaching the outskirts of Kyiv and Zhytomyr. Main winemaking areas were located in Odesa, Kherson and Transcarpathia regions, as well as in Crimea. During Soviet times Ukraine with 2,500 km^{2} (965 sq mi) was the largest supplier of the wines in the USSR. It came to a disaster in 1986: about 800 km^{2} (309 sq mi) of the vineyards were destroyed, when Soviet General Secretary Mikhail Gorbachev started a campaign against the over-consumption of alcohol in USSR. Since 2000 the production as well as the export of the wines has increased rapidly.

After the annexation of Crimea, Ukraine lost not only 17 thousand hectares of vineyards, but also wineries that provided 60% of wines.

== Main vine-growing regions ==
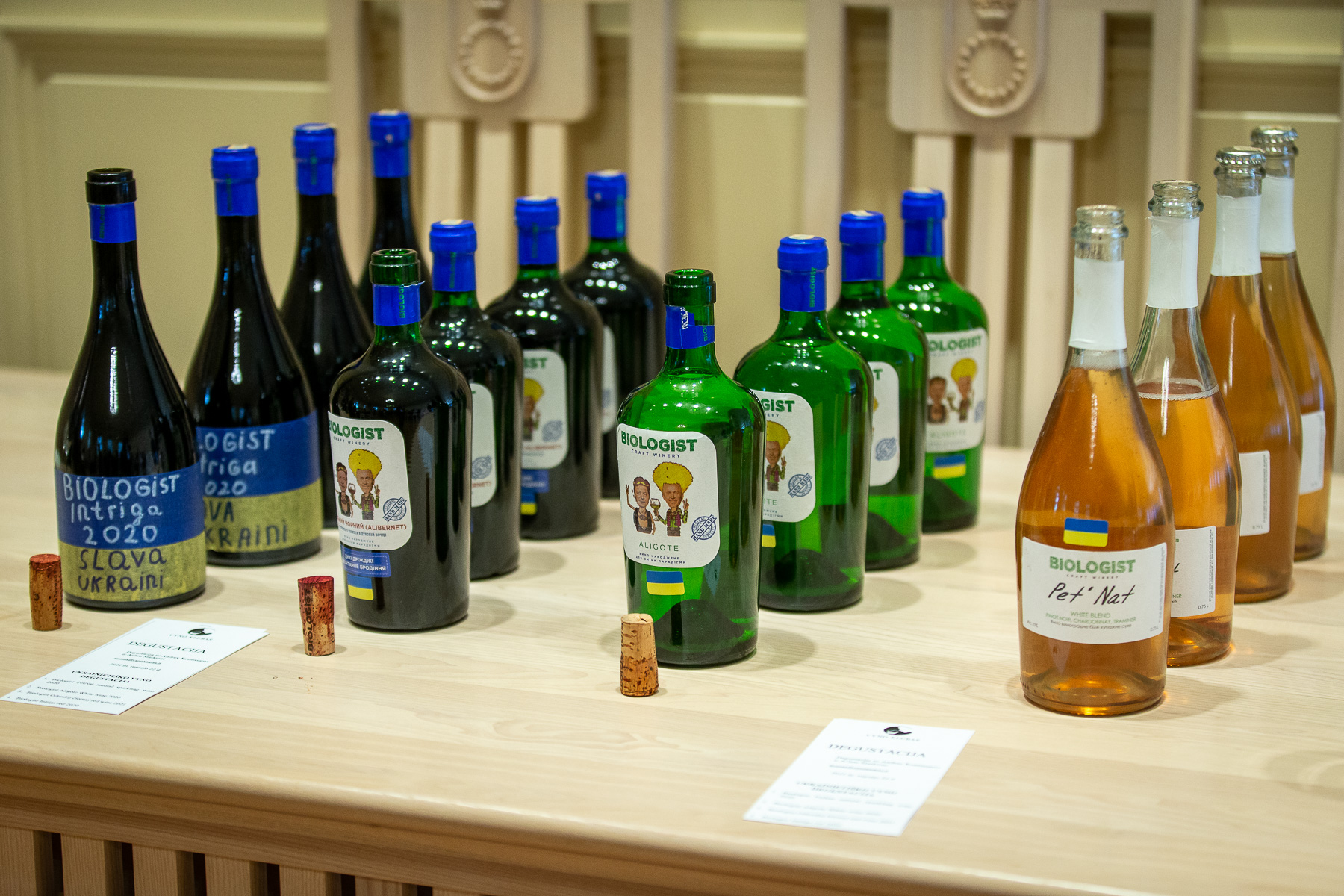
Ukrainian wines

- Southern Ukraine: Mykolaiv, Kherson, Dnipropetrovsk, and Odesa oblasts as well as such regions like Crimea (Balaklava, Massandra) and Bessarabia/Budjak (Shabo, Krynychne)
- Zakarpattia Oblast (Carpathian Ruthenia)
- Varietals

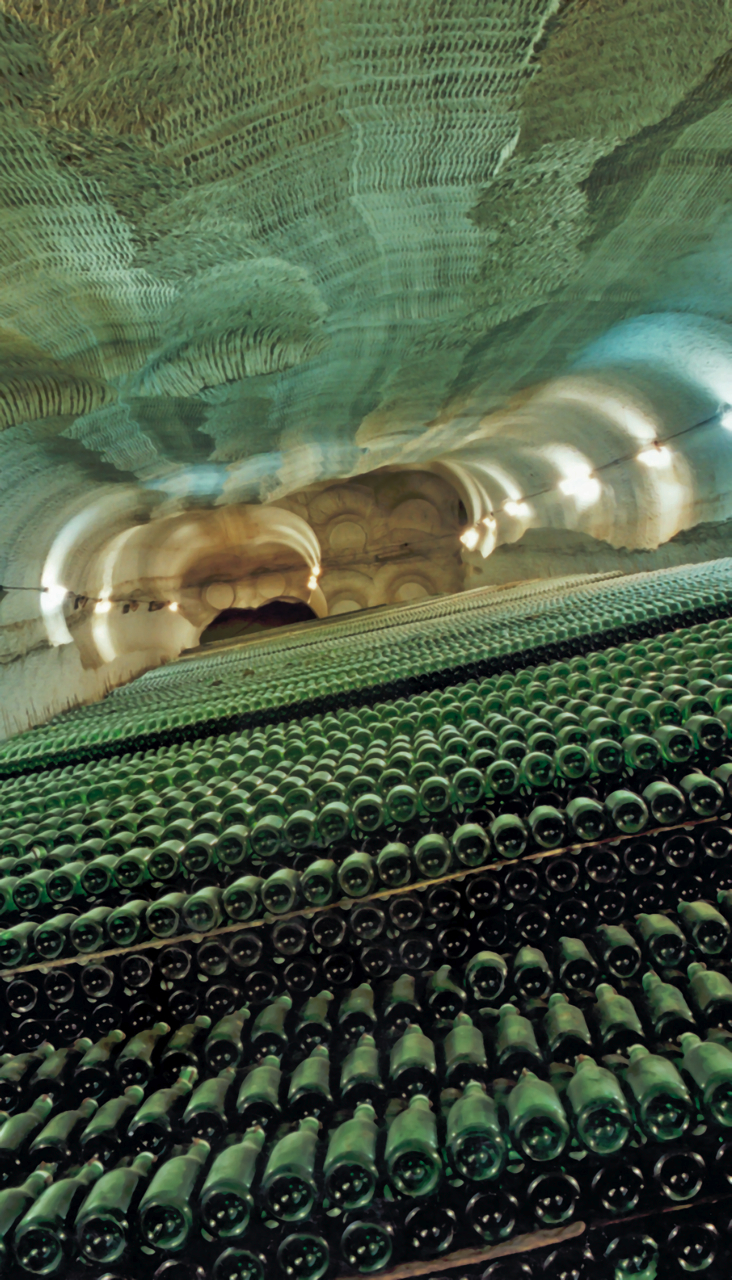
Sparkling wine from Bakhmut caves

The main varietals are Aligoté, Muscat, Isabella, Traminer, Cabernet Sauvignon, Chardonnay, Pinot noir, Pinot gris, Rkatsiteli. The Golubok grape variety was first cultivated in Ukraine.

=== Sparkling wines ===
Most sparkling wine is produced around large cities like Kyiv, Bakhmut, Lviv, Odesa and Kharkiv. Most of the production is based on Pinot blanc, Aligoté, Riesling and Feteasca.

== Special wineries ==
- Magarach Wine Institute near Yalta with possibility to sample some of their 20,000 different wines derived from 3,200 vine species.
- Massandra Winery
- Winery and center of wine culture in Shabo

== See also ==
- Konstantin Frank
- Winemaking in Crimea
- Russian wine
- Agriculture in Ukraine
