= Abrau-Dyurso =

Abrau-Dyurso Абрау-Дюрсо
- Selo
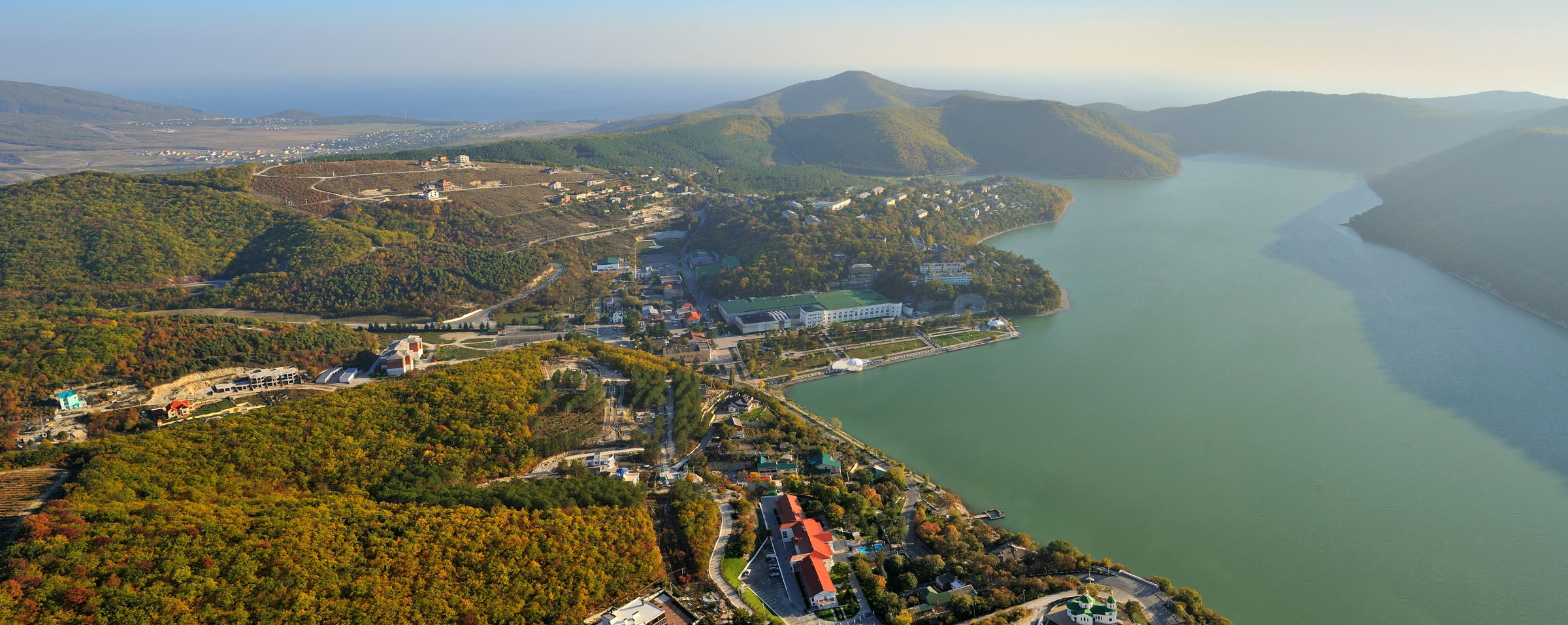
- Interactive map of Abrau-Dyurso
- Location of Abrau-Dyurso Abrau-Dyurso (Krasnodar Krai)
- Coordinates: 44°42′10″N 37°36′07″E
- Country: Russia
- Federal subject: Krasnodar Krai
- Administrative district: Novorossyisk Urban Okrug
- Founded: 1870
- Elevation: 136 m (446 ft)

Population (2010 Census)
  - Total: 3,519
  - Estimate (2021): 3,752 (+6.6%)

Municipal status
  - Municipal district: Novorossyisk Urban Okrug
  - Urban settlement: Abrau-Dyurso Rural Okrug
  - Capital of: Abrau-Dyurso Rural Okrug
- Time zone: UTC+3 (MSK)
- Postal code: 353995
- Dialing code: +7 8617
- OKTMO ID: 03720000106

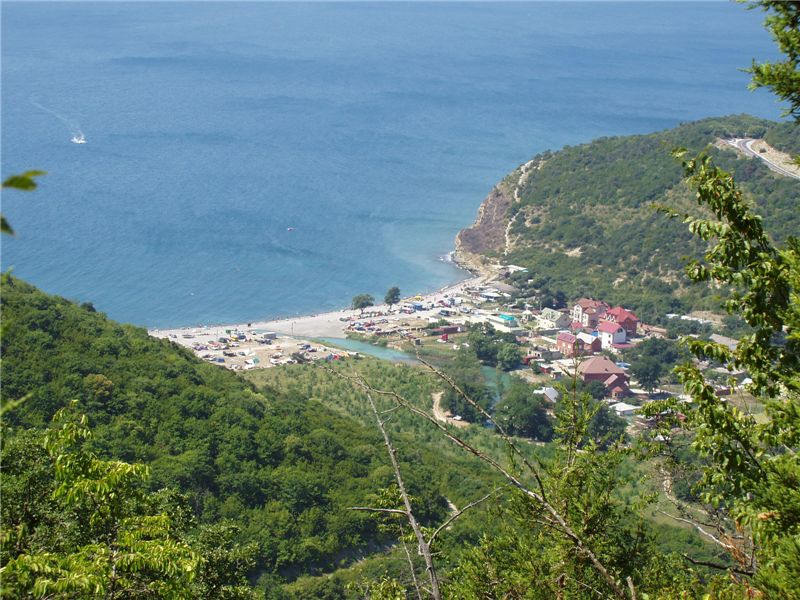
View of Abrau-Dyurso

Abrau-Dyurso or Abrau-Durso (Russian: Абрау-Дюрсо) is a rural locality (a selo) under the administrative jurisdiction of the City of Novorossiysk in Krasnodar Krai, Russia. It is located on the shore of Lake Abrau, 14 kilometers (8.7 mi) west of Novorossiysk. It should not be confused with the khutor of Dyurso, which is located 4 kilometers (2.5 mi) to the south, where the Dyurso River enters the Black Sea, and which is sometimes incorrectly considered to be a part of Abrau-Dyurso. Population: 3,519 (2010 census); 2,982 (2002 census); 2,792 (1989 Soviet census).

== History ==
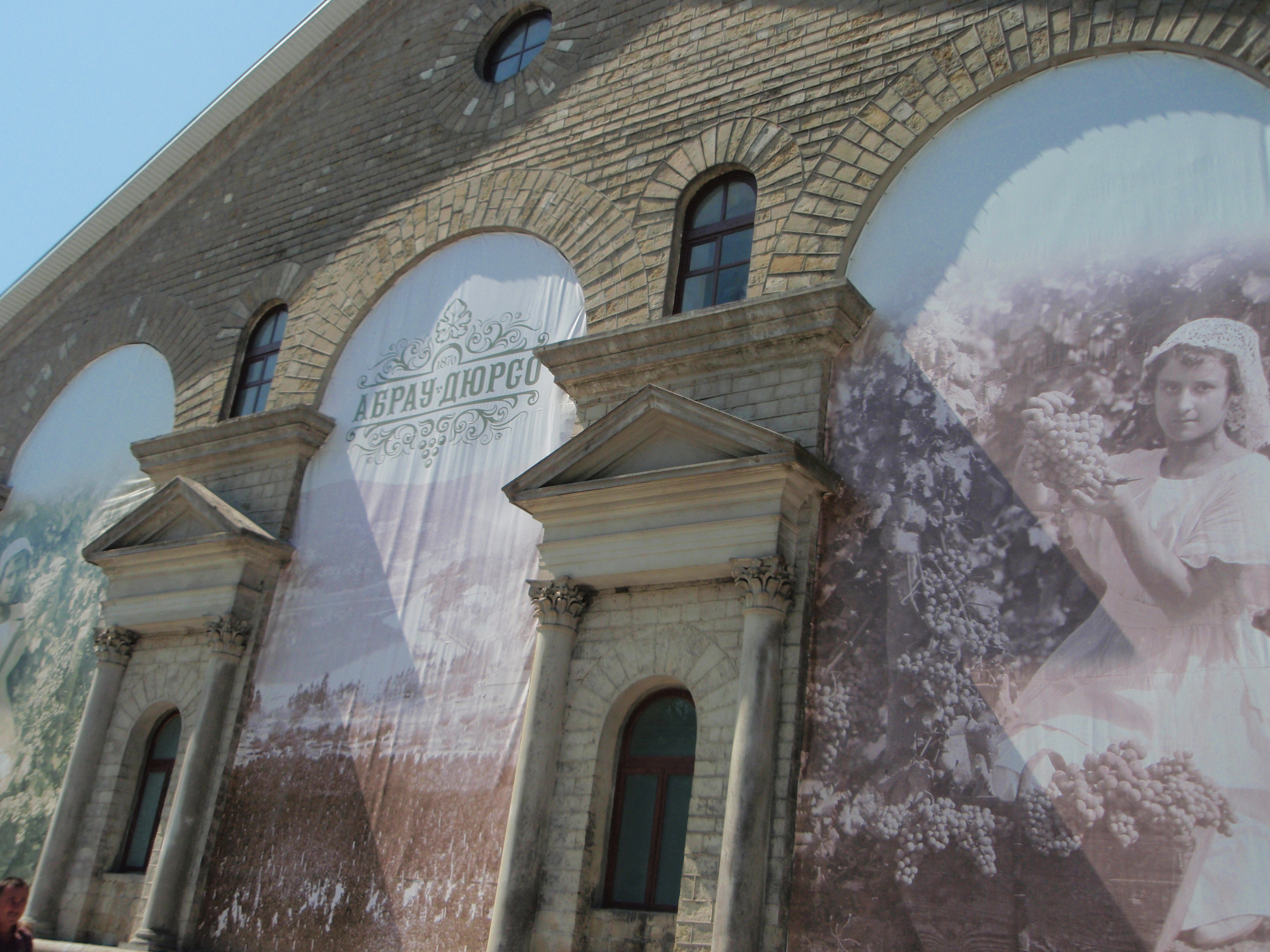
Abrau-Dyurso winery main building

The settlement was founded on November 25, 1870 as a royal winery which was to provide wine for the Tsar's household. These plans were brought to fruition twenty-one years later, when Prince Lev Golitsyn, renowned for his Crimean vineyards of Massandra and Novy Svet, was appointed Surveyor of Imperial Vineyards at Abrau-Dyurso. It was he who brought to Russia a team of skilled winemakers from France. By 1897, Abrau-Dyurso boasted champagne cellars containing in excess of 13,000 bottles.

The Russian Revolution of 1917 brought an end to Abrau-Dyurso's prosperity, if only for a short time. The French specialists fled Russia, but their work was continued by their Russian apprentices. Throughout the Soviet period, Abrau-Dyurso was reputed for its sparkling wine, which was marketed under the name of Sovetskoye Shampanskoye ("Soviet Champagne").

== Economy ==
Abrau-Dyurso is the center of Russia's most important wine-growing region.

In August 2002, the local earth dam located upstream of the Dyurso River collapsed, washing away some of the grape fields in the Dyurso Valley and killing 2 people.

As of 2005, the local winery, Abrau-Durso, produced 5,800,000 bottles of sparkling wine. There is a museum of sparkling wines on its grounds.
