= Abrau-Durso (winery) =

Russian wine company

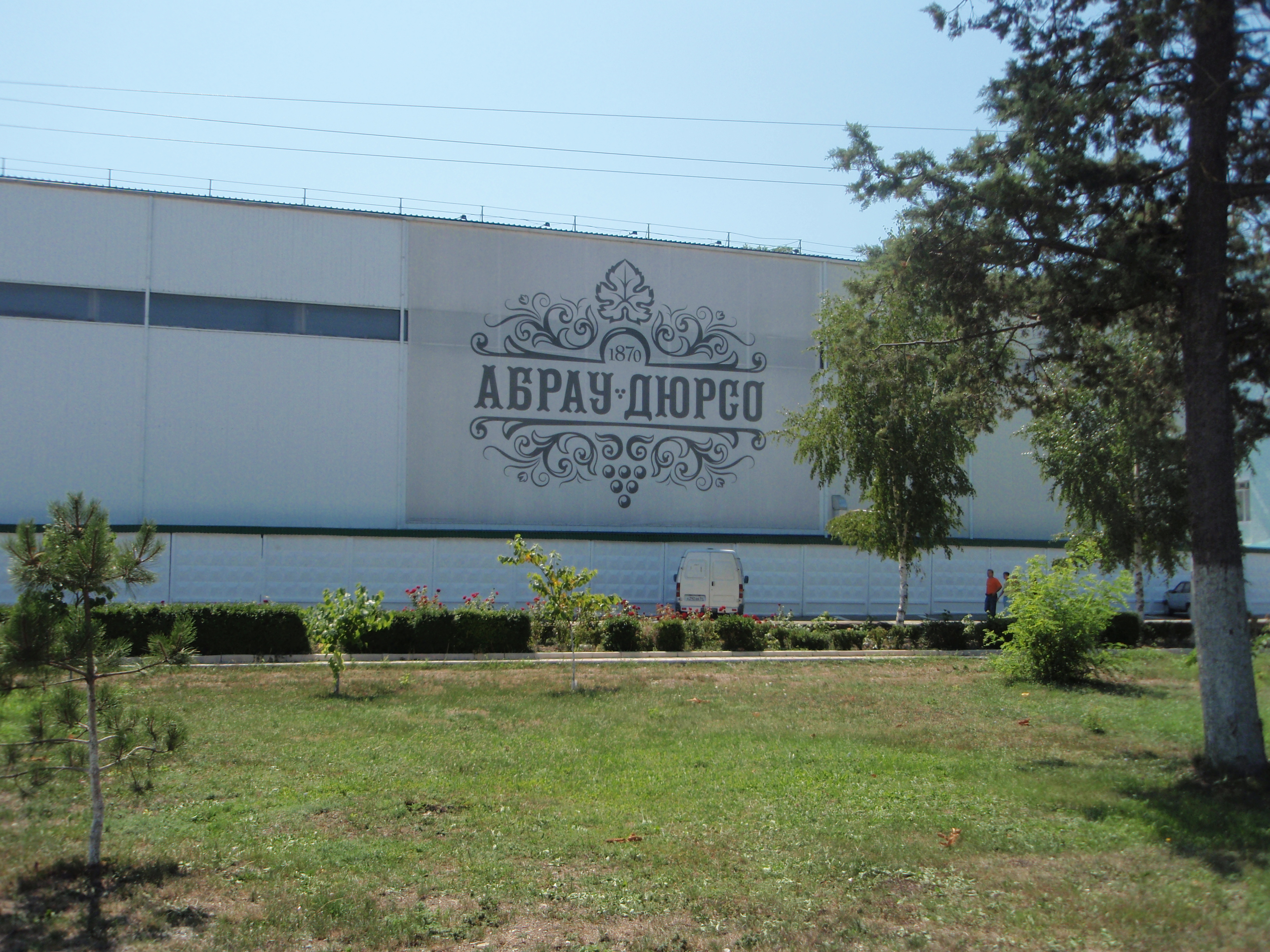
Abrau-Durso winery

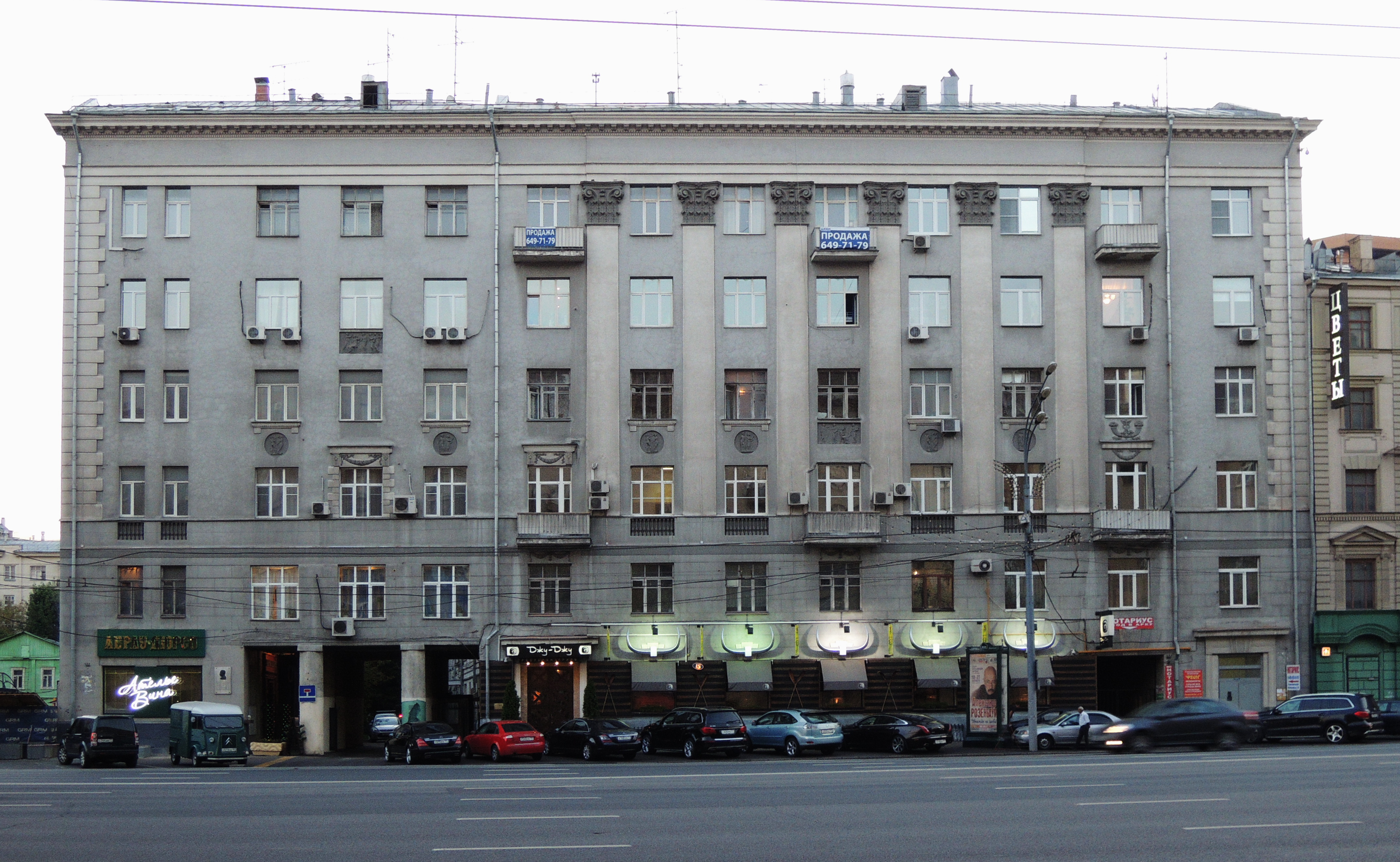
Brand store. Moscow, Zubovsky Boulevard, 15

Abrau-Durso (Russian: Абрау-Дюрсо; MCX: ABRD) is a Russian wine company located in the village of Abrau-Dyurso near both Lake Abrau (Russian: озеро Абрау), the Dyurso River (Russian: Дюрсо река) and the Black Sea Coast and about 15 kilometres (9.3 mi) west of the Black Sea port of Novorossiysk.

The winery was established in 1870 by decree of the Emperor of all the Russias Alexander II. (Note: From 1891 to 1898, Prince Lev Sergeevich Golitsyn, by order of Emperor Alexander III, was appointed chief winemaker of the estate of His Imperial Majesty Livadia and appanage estates of the Crimea and the Caucasus, including Abrau-Durso. He retained this post from 1891 to 1898.) It produces and sells sparkling wines, (Note: In 2015, the Abrau-Durso winery produced "Imperial", "Abrau-Durso Victor Dravigny", "Abrau-Durso Classic", "Russian Sparkling Wine" and Abrau Light (Russian: «Империал», «Абрау-Дюрсо Victor Dravigny», «Абрау-Дюрсо классическое», «Русское шампанское» и Abrau Light).) and also operates a hotel, spa, and restaurant. Abrau-Durso is described as owning one of the best wine regions in Russia, and belongs to Boris Titov through his SVL Group since 2006.

In 1975, Abrau-Durso began exporting its champagne Nazdorovya (Note: Russian: На здоровье transliterated as Na zdorovie, in Hollywood, often is intended as a toast for "to health".) to numerous countries including the countries of Eastern Europe, Belgium, Brazil, Italy, Canada, Mexico, and the USA with PepsiCo through its wholly owned 1934 founded importing firm Monsieur Henri Wines (Note: The 1969 created VTO "Soyuzplodoimport" (Russian: ВТО«Союзплодоимпорт») dealt with vegetable products such as tea, coffee, cocoa beans, and, of course, Soviet alcohol including both champagne and vodka. In 1966, the Ministry of Foreign Trade (Russian: Министерство внешней торговли) divided the commodity flows between VTO "Soyuzplodoimport" and "Prodintorg" (Russian: "Продинторг") which dealt with agricultural products of animal origin.) (Note: In 2025, PepsiCo's formerly wholly owned 1934 founded importing firm Monsieur Henri Wines is known as MHW.) supplying Nazdorovya champagne along with Stolichnaya vodka to the American market. (Note: Although PepsiCo wanted its bottling plant located at the resort town of Sochi, inadequate water supplies near Sochi caused the bottling site to be at the Novorossiysk brewery "Pino" (Russian: новороссийский пивзавод "Пино") which began producing Pepsi-Cola for the USSR on 31 May 1974. In the 1970s, Novorossiysk received its fresh water shipments on tankers from Tuapse. Although the Troitsky Group water pipeline (TGV) (Russian: «Троицкий групповой водопровод» (ТГВ)) was established in 1971, the Troitsky Group water pipeline (TGV) brought fresh water from artesian wells through the mountains to Novorossiysk much later. (Note: Along with the Troitsky Group water pipeline (TGV) (Russian: «Троицкий групповой водопровод» (ТГВ)), the Taman and Yeisk water pipelines (Russian: Таманский и Ейский водопроводы) are being built in Kuban. Troitsky Group Water Supply System (TGV) began because of a unique underground water deposit located on the left bank of the Kuban River in the area of the Troitskaya village in the Krymsky District. The three water pipelines will ensure uninterrupted water supply to a significant part of the Azov-Black Sea coast of the region including the hero city of Novorossiysk, the resort city of Gelendzhik and the city of Krymsk, as well as to the settlements of Moldavanskoye, Troitskoye and Nizhnebakanskoye rural settlements of the Krymsky district, and settlements on the Black Sea coast.) Additional plants in Moscow and Leningrad were producing Pepsi later and, by 1989, PepsiCo had 21 factories in the Soviet Union. As of 2017, the original Soviet era PepsiCo plant in Novorossiysk brews and bottles Novoross beer (Russian: пиво «Новоросс»).) This was the first cooperation of food production between the United States and the USSR during détente. (Note: After losing the 1960 United States presidential election, Richard Nixon, who became a partner at Mudge Rose Guthrie Alexander & Ferdon and was close to Donald Kendall, gained employment as an attorney representing PepsiCo's interests.)

To show support for Abrau-Durso, Vladimir Putin visited the winery on 20 August 2013.

In July 2015, the Russian Wine House Abrau-Durso group of companies controlled the Champagne Wine Factory in Abrau-Dyurso, the Lazurnaya Yagoda winery (Note: Russian: винное хозяйство «Лазурная ягода») (Gelendzhik, Usadba Divnomorskoye and Abrau brands), (Note: Russian: г. Геленджик, бренды «Усадьба Дивноморское», «Абрау») which are closely associated with Vladimir Putin through his palace at Gelendzhik, the Chateau d'Avize Champagne House (Champagne, France, Foliage brand), as well as the Vedernikov Group of Companies (Note: Russian: Группа компаний «Ведерниковъ») in the Rostov Region.

In 2019, Vedomosti reported that the Abrau-Durso wine group is the largest Russian producer of champagne and sparkling wines with an estimated 19% share of the Russian market.

Boris Titov's SVL Group, which owns Abrau-Durso, owned the formerly Moet & Chandon label, which had been owned by LVMH Moet Hennessy Louis Vuitton SA, Chateau d'Avize beginning in June 2010. In May 2014, Boris Titov handed over his Abrau-Durso champagne factory to his son Pavel Titov as chairman of the board of directors. In early March 2023, the Pavel and Boris Titov associated Abrau-Durso Group announced that it had sold its French asset the champagne house Chateau d'Avize, which is located in the heart of Côte des Blancs, in January 2022. Pavel Titov, who is closely associated with Alexei Repik (Note: Russian: Алексей Репик) through Delovaya Russia (DR), (Note: Russian: Деловая Россия (ДР)) (Deloros.ru)) noted that Abrau-Durso Group had owned Foliage, Chateau d'Avize and Titov & Fils, which all are produced in the region, and would only retain Titov & Fils.

In late January 2021, Vladimir Putin stated, "I have an adviser - Boris Titov, who is the owner of Abrau-Durso, our large company with a good background. <… >He's my adviser now. When I'm done, maybe I'll go work as an adviser to him. But not as a businessman, but as a specialist - at least in the field of law." (Note: Russian: «У меня советник есть — Борис Титов, который является владельцем "Абрау-Дюрсо", крупной нашей компании с хорошим бэкграундом. <…> Он у меня сейчас советник. Когда работу закончу, может, я пойду работать советником к нему. Но не как бизнесмен, а как специалист — хотя бы в области права») Boris Titov replied, "There is no entrepreneur in the world who would not agree or refuse such an offer," because Titov knows that in the field of law Putin "knows the wine industry very well" and signed the law for wine and grapes which today "is working with might and main and developing winemaking in Russia." Pavel Titov added that Putin's statements were a "complete surprise" and said that for a sparkling wine maker "it would be a great honor to work with a specialist of this level."

Although sunflower oil is the most popular cooking oil in Russia, (Note: In Russia in 2021, sunflower oil accounted for 72% of sales with olive oil accounting for 22%, corn oil accounting for 1.2% and grape seed oil accounting for 0.6% according to Vedomosti.) the Abrau-Durso group announced in February 2021 that it began producing grape seed oil with Yubileinaya winery (Note: Russian: Группа Винодельня «Юбилейная») in Krasnodar Krai, which is part of the Abrau-Durso group, providing the pressing.

In January 2022, after the Abrau-Durso holding gained a 51% stake in Kosmetech LLC (Note: Russian: ООО «Косметех») on October 1, 2021, the Arbau-Durso holding announced that it would be producing Abrau Cosmetics, which is a line of cosmetic products based upon its grape seed oil, with Pavel Titov's wife Ksenia Titova (Note: Russian: Ксения Титова) along with Ruslan Romantsev, (Note: Russian: Руслан Романцев) who owns the remaining 49% stake in Abrau Cosmetics, as CEO heading this Kubanbytkhim LLC based (Note: Russian: база ООО «Кубаньбытхим») Novorossiysk located division.

In March 2023 TASS reported that, since 1870 in Russia, Abrau-Durso has been a leading producer of sparkling and still wines with exports to over 19 countries.

In December 2023, the Abrau-Durso wine holding, which includes the wineries Abrau-Durso, Loza, (Note: Launched in 2017 by Abrau-Durso, Loza LLC (Russian: ООО «Лоза») is located at Sukko village, Anapsky District, Krasnodar Krai. (Russian: село Сукко Анапского района).) and Vedernikov Winery, (Note: Since 2015, Vedernikov Winery (Russian: «Винодельня Ведерниковъ»), which is on the right bank of the Don River in the Rostov Region, has been controlled by Abrau-Durso.) was controlled by three people: Boris Titov through his Aktiv Capital LLC (Note: Russian: ООО «Актив капитал») with a 57.8% stake, Pavel Titov with a 32% stake and Igor Lozovsky (Note: Russian: Игорь Лозовский) with a 1% stake.

== See also ==
- Lev Golitsyn
