= Aleksey Repik =

Russian businessman (born 1979)

Aleksey Evgenievich Repik
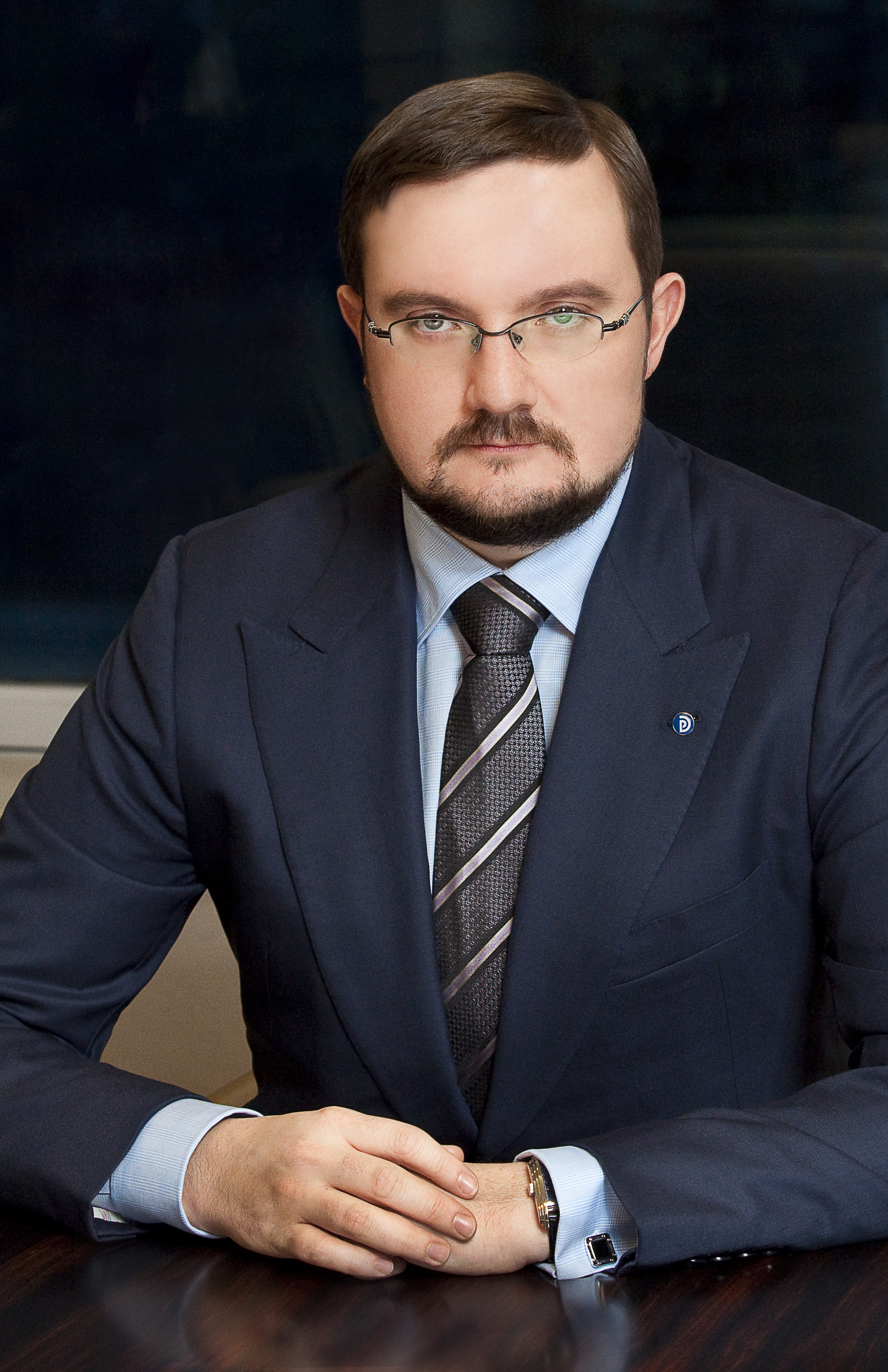
- Born: 27 August 1979 (age 46); Moscow, Soviet Union
- Education: Higher School of Economics

Aleksey Evgenievich Repik (Russian: Алексей Евгеньевич Репик; born 27 August 1979) is a Russian businessman and public figure. He is the Chairman of the All-Russian public organization "Business Russia" since October 2019. President of Delovaya Rossiya (2014-2019).

Founder of the R-Pharm group of companies. According to Forbes for 2021, is in the list of the richest businessmen in Russia, Alexei Repik ranks 57th with a fortune of US$2.6 billion. Over the past year, his fortune has grown by US$0.5 billion.

Through Delovaya Russia (DR) (Russian: Деловая Россия (ДР)) (Deloros.ru), Repik is closely associated with Boris Titov's son Pavel Titov who has been chairman of the board of Abrau-Durso Group companies since May 2014.

In 2022, he stepped down as chairman of the board of directors of the R-Pharm group of companies and sold all assets associated with R-Pharm.

On 8 February 2023, against the backdrop of the Russian invasion of Ukraine, Repik was included in the UK sanctions list.

In 2024, he served as an authorized representative of Russian presidential candidate Vladimir Putin.
