= Novyi Svit (winery) =

Winery from Novyi Svit area in Crimea, Ukraine

Coordinates: 44°49′37″N 34°54′46″E

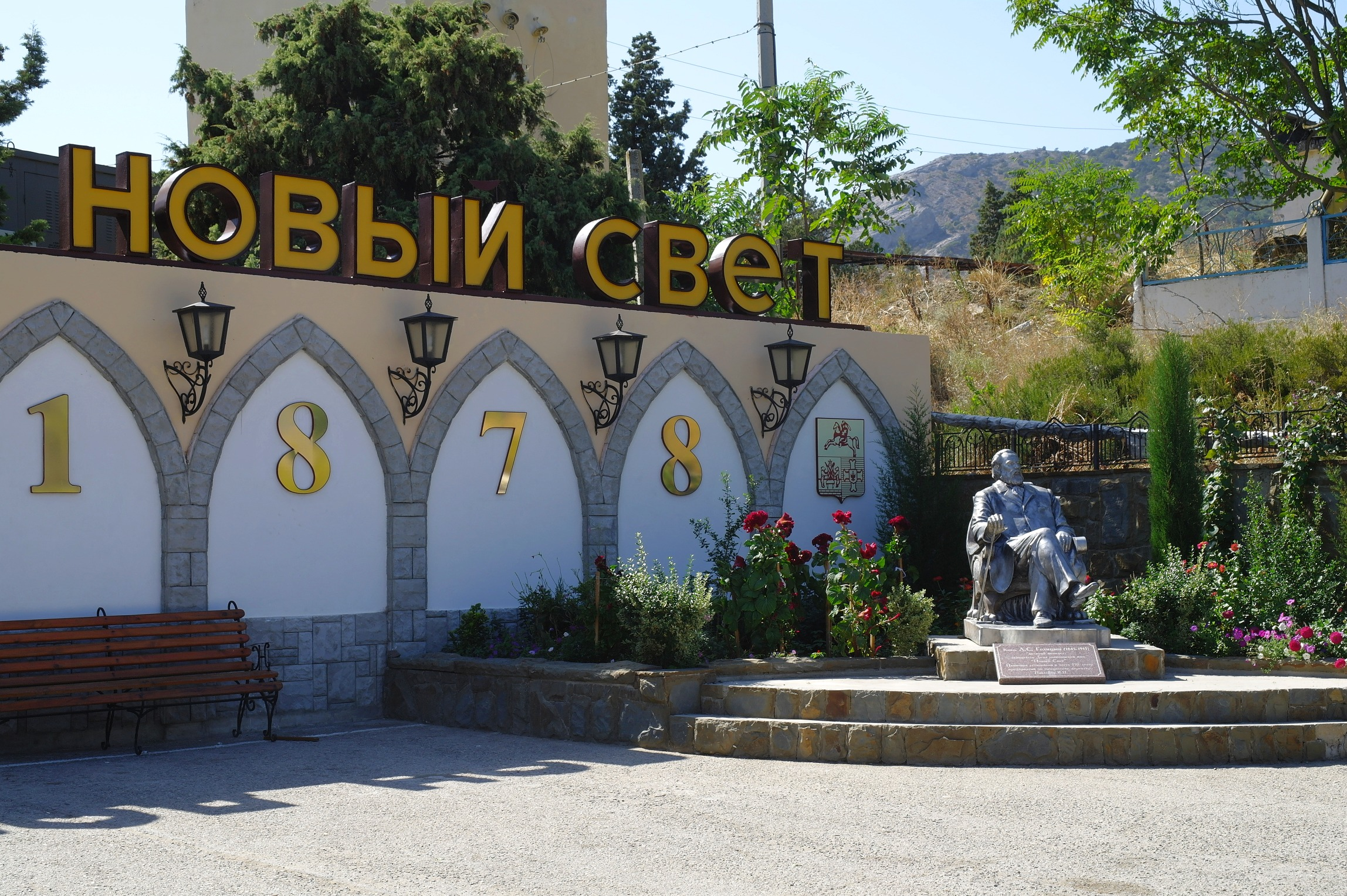
Knyaz Lev Golitsyn Monument, Novyi Svit

The Novyi Svit (Ukrainian: Новий Світ [noˈwɪj ˈs⁽ʲ⁾wit]; Russian: Новый Свет, romanized: Novyi Svet, lit. 'New World') is a sparkling wine brand from Novyi Svit area in Crimea.

== History ==
Novyi Svit was established by Prince Lev S. Galitzine in 1878, who is often referenced in Russian as Prince Golitsyn. He acquired the area known as Novyi Svit on the southern coast of Crimea; it is on the same latitude as Southern France, and so the climate was suitable for growing high quality grapes. After building 3 km of cellars and planting Chardonnay, Riesling, Pinot Meunier and Pinot noir vines, he spent ten years refining his creation with the traditional method of bottle fermenting for three years at a constant temperature of 15C.

In 1896, his sparkling wines were served at the coronation of the last Tsar, Nicholas II. That same year, Prince Golitsyn used the right to display the family coat of arms on his wines. His creation became known worldwide when it won a Grand Prix at the World Exhibition in Paris in 1900.

Today, historically unrelated modern, post-Soviet entities have laid claim to the brand. In December 2017 100% of shares of the Noviy Svet Winery were purchased by Yuzny Proekt LLC, a subsudiary of Rossiya Bank.

== Production ==
Novyi Svit sparkling wines are made by the traditional champagne method, hand riddled by one person and bottle fermented for three years. Each coupage is produced solely from each particular year's harvest.
