= Krasnostop =

Variety of grape

Krasnostop Zolotovsky
- Grape (Vitis)
- Color of berry skin: Rouge
- Species: Vitis vinifera
- Origin: Don basin (Russia)
- Notable regions: Rostov Oblast, Krasnodar Krai
- VIVC number: 6485

Krasnostop Zolotovsky is an indigenous Russian grape variety that is regarded as the local grape with the best potential for red wine production.

The name 'Krasnostop' is derived from the Russian words Krasniy (Russian: Красный, which means Red) and Stopa (Russian: Стопа, which means Grape stalks), that describe the appearance of its stems. It gives wines that are typically rich in tannins, alcohol and acidity, with flavors reminiscent of dark plums, redcurrant and green pepper. Notable producers include Vedernikov Winery and Domaines Burnier, both of which produce a varietal wine from this rare grape.

== See also ==
- Russian wine
