= Lake Abrau =

Lake in Krasnodar Krai, Russia

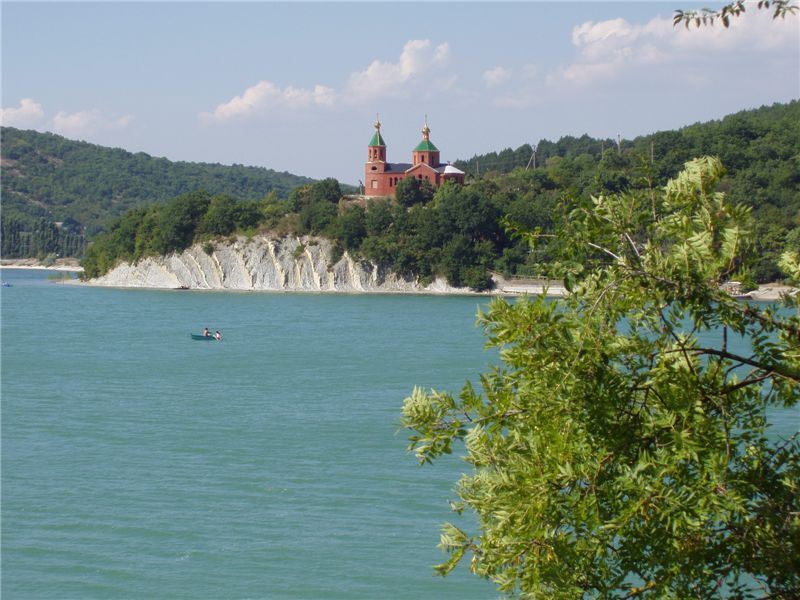
- A church by the lakeside

- Location within Russia
- Location: Krasnodar Krai
- Coordinates: 44°42′N 37°35.5′E
- Type: karst
- Primary outflows: none
- Basin countries: Russia
- Max. depth: 20 m (66 ft)
- Surface elevation: 84 m (276 ft)
- Settlements: Abrau-Dyurso

Abrau (Russian: Абрау; from the Abkhaz word for "sinkhole") is a karst lake in Russia, the largest in Krasnodar Krai. It lies at 84 metres above sea level, among the foothills of the Forecaucasus, about 14 kilometres from the Black Sea port of Novorossiysk. The lake is approximately 2,600 metres long and 600 metres wide.

In the early 20th century, the lake was reported to be 35 metres deep; today the deepest point is at 20 metres. Lake Abrau has no outlet. The basin of the lake is a major wine-growing region; there are numerous wineries in the lakeside village of Abrau-Dyurso.
