= Golubok =

Grape variety

- Grape (Vitis)
- Color of berry skin: Noir
- Origin: Odesa, Ukraine
- Original pedigree: Severnyy
- Notable regions: Ukraine, Russia, Moldova, Czech Republic, United States
- Notable wines: Monovarietal and Cabernet Sauvignon blends
- Hazards: Bunch rot
- Year of crossing: 1958
- Year of protection: 1981
- Formation of seeds: Complete
- Sex of flowers: Hermaphrodite
- VIVC number: 4888

Wine characteristics
- General: Dark, tannic

Golubok or Holubok (Ukrainian: Голубок) is a Ukrainian variety of black grape used to make red wines, most notably grown in Ukraine and southern Russia. It is also cultivated in other parts of Europe and the United States.

== History and origins ==
Golubok is an interspecific hybrid of Severnyy X pollen from different varieties: 40 Let Oktyabrya, Odesskiy Ranniy and No 1-17-54 (Alicante Bouschet and Cabernet Sauvignon). It is a relatively new cultivar, created in Odesa, Ukraine in 1958. It became a protected variety in 1981. The word "golubok" means "little pigeon" in Russian, and is used as a term of endearment.

== Viticulture ==
Golubok ripens early with moderately sized bunches and berries. It requires protection from birds earlier than others, and appears susceptible to bunch rot in the Puget Sound AVA. It is moderately resistant to downy and powdery mildews, which is attributed to its descendance from the Severny cultivar. It is frost-resistant, and resistant to temperatures of -25 °C (-13 °F).

A study of recently introduced cultivars, selections, and clones (predominantly from cool climate areas) was conducted at Washington State University's Mount Vernon NWREC in 2000, which showed that Golubok performed well at 1900 growing degree days (GDD) and below.

== Winemaking ==
The variety is considered to be a teinturier grape, having both pigmented skin and pigmented pulp. The grapes have a deep color that appears black and a rich flavor coming from its darkly pigmented pulp and skin. It exhibits moderate acidity and moderate to high tannins, with aromas of blackcurrant, blackberry, black plum, black cherry, and spice. Golubok is characterized by a high concentration of phenolic compounds. Its must has a sugar content of 20-24%.

It is considered to have a fairly reliable yield and is suited to grape juice production and winemaking. It is used in the production of red wines. It is typically fermented in stainless steel casks, and is blended with other grapes such as Cabernet Sauvignon more often than it is used to produce monovarietal wines. Golubok grapes are also suited to the production of dessert wines.

== Wine regions ==
Golubok is originally from Ukraine and southern Russia, but is also grown in Moldova and the Czech Republic. It has been cultivated in the states of Iowa and Washington in the United States.
