= Novyi Svit =

Novyi Svit Новий Світ Russian: Новый Свет
- Urban-type settlement
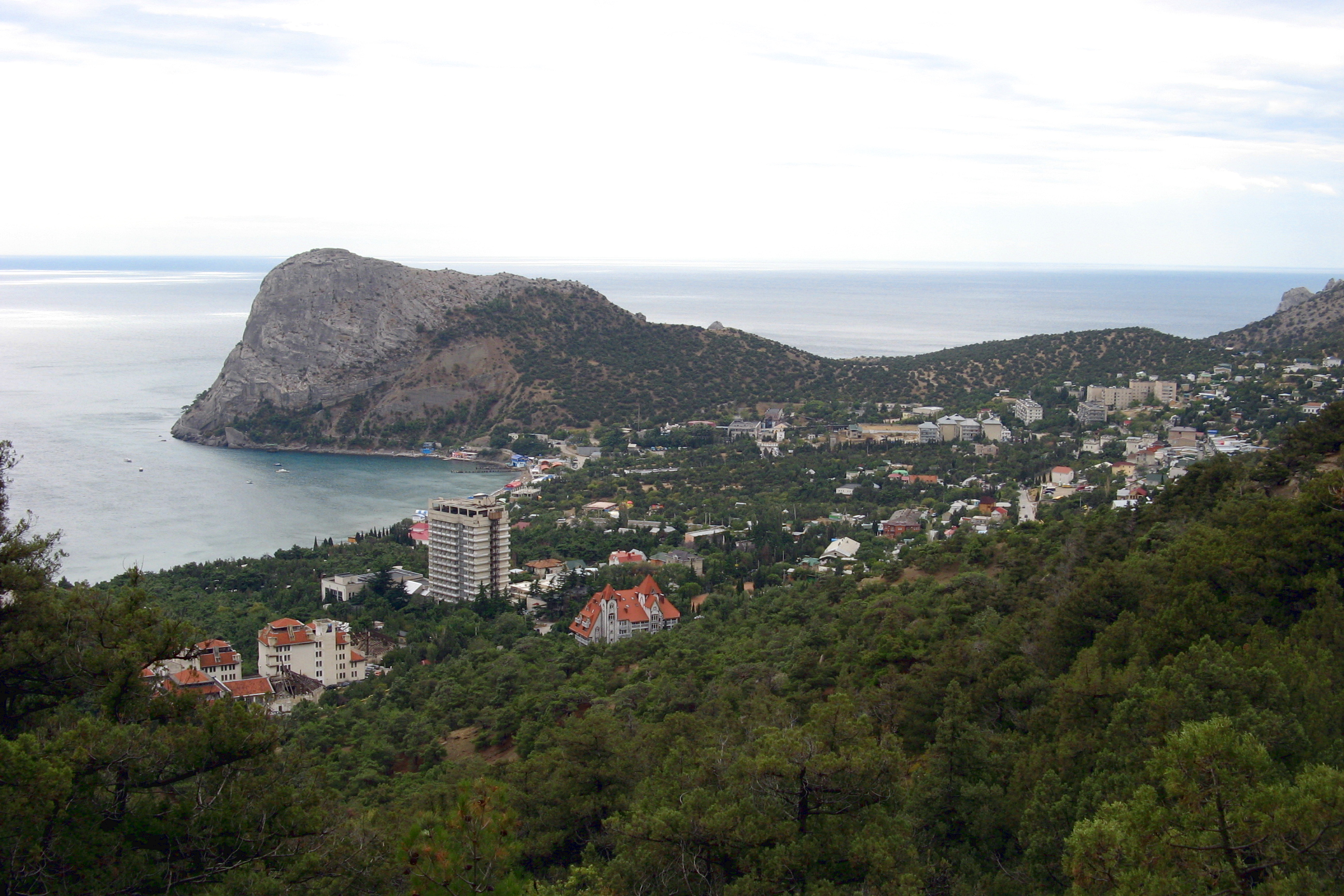
- Novyi Svit seen from the north-eastern part of town.

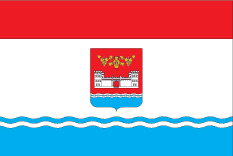
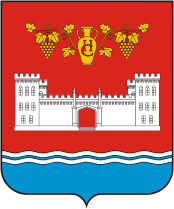
- Flag Coat of arms
- Interactive map of Novyi Svit
- Location of Novyi Svit on a map of Crimea.
- Coordinates: 44°49′45″N 34°54′46″E
- Republic: Crimea
- Municipality: Sudak Municipality
- Elevation: 50 m (160 ft)

Population (2014)
  - Total: 1,248
- Time zone: UTC+4 (MSK)
- Postal code: 98032
- Area code: +380 6566

Novyi Svit or Novy Svet (Ukrainian: Новий Світ [noˈwɪj ˈs⁽ʲ⁾wit]; Russian: Новый Свет; Crimean Tatar: Novıy Svet; lit. 'New World' or 'New Community') is a resort and urban-type settlement in Sudak Municipality in the Autonomous Republic of Crimea, a territory recognized by a majority of countries as part of Ukraine and incorporated by Russia as the Republic of Crimea. It is known for Novyi Svit sparkling wine produced there. Champagne production was introduced into Novyi Svit by a local landowner, Prince Lev Golitsyn, in the late 19th century. Population: 1,248 (2014 Census).

The town is situated in an area where numerous Soviet movies were filmed. It includes fine beaches, a couple of resort hotels (one of which was supposed to be for Soviet cosmonauts), a several km tunnel inside a mountain where a factory stores its products, and a large juniper forest.

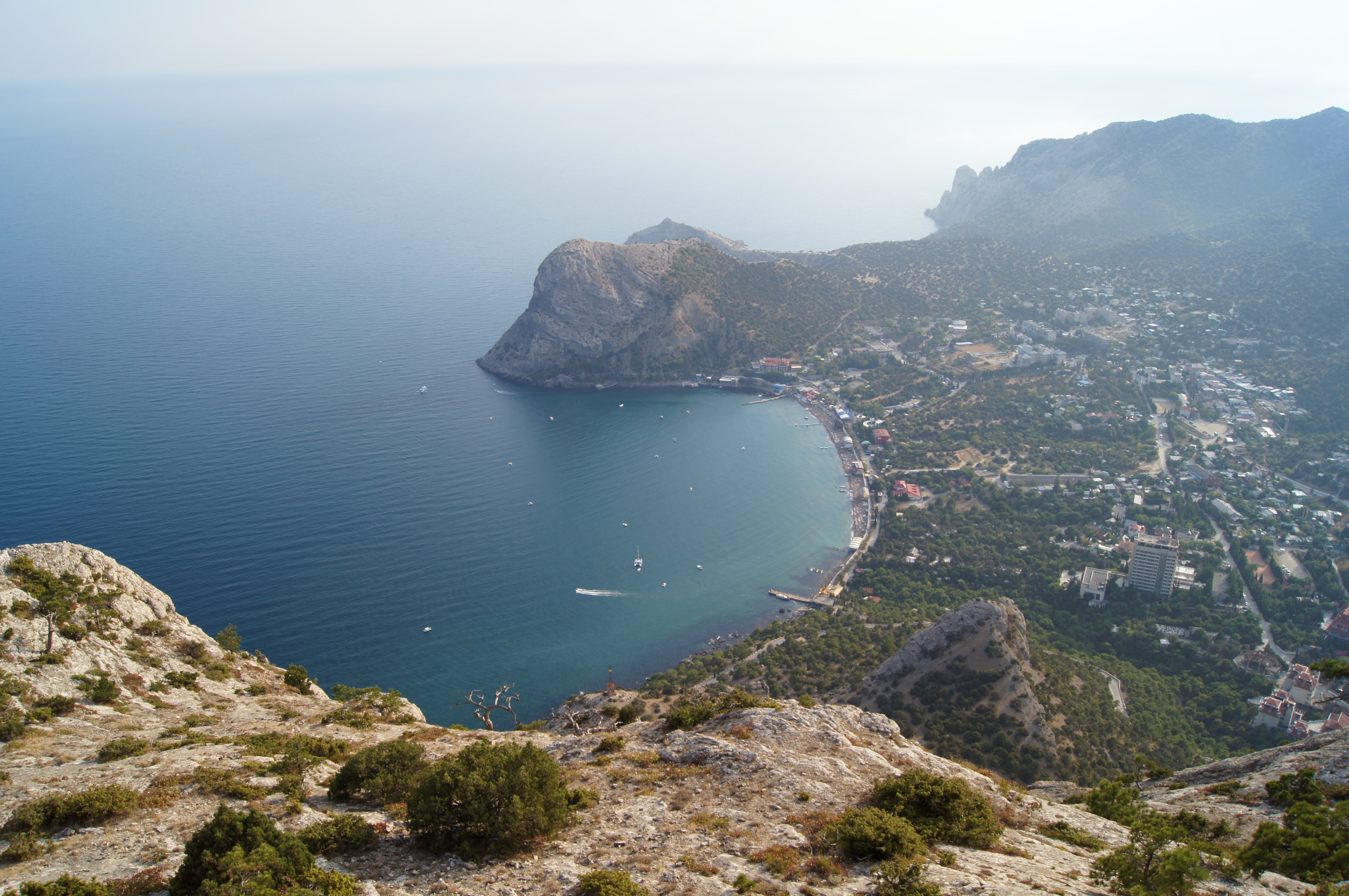
Bay of Novy Svet

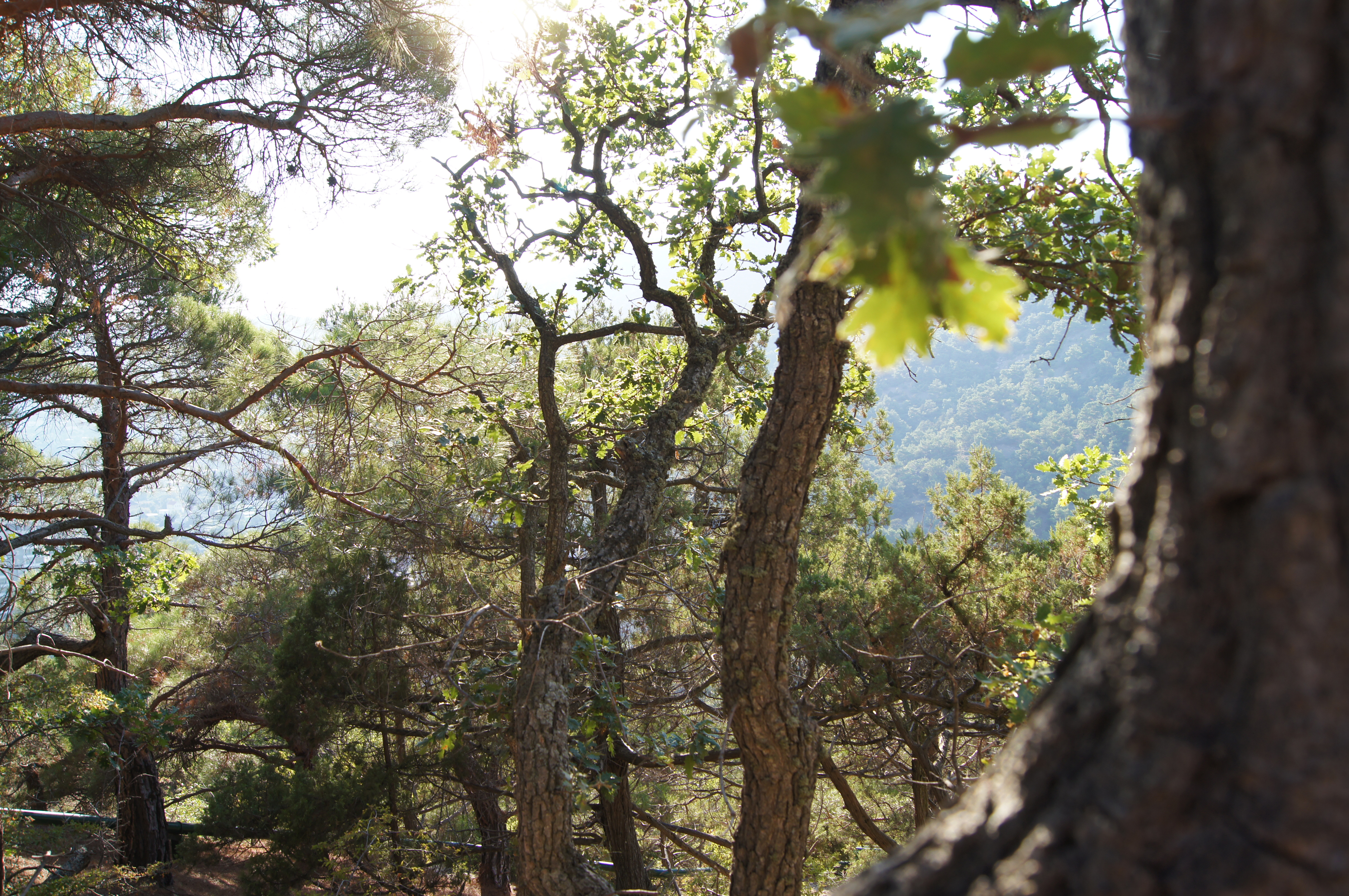
A Juniper forest in Novyi Svit

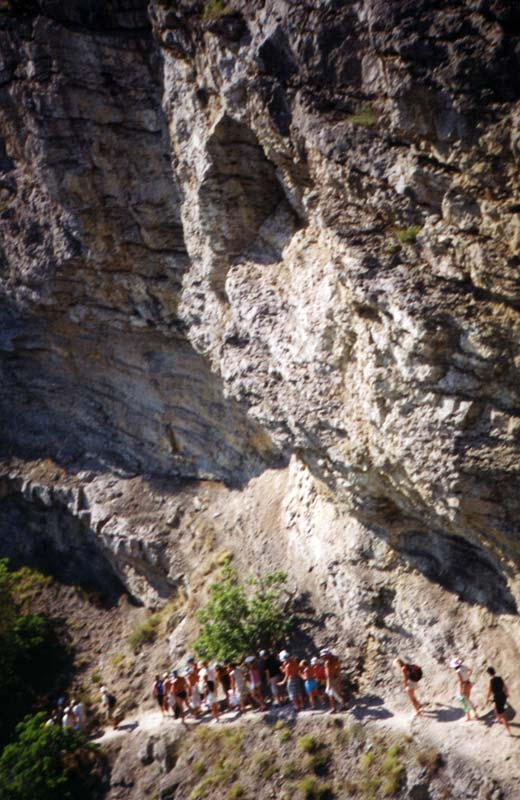
Holitsynska path

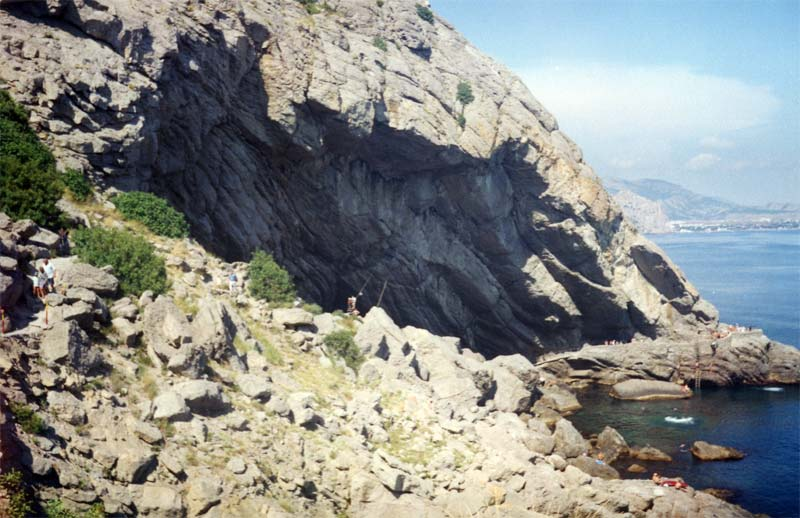
Muzikal'niy cave

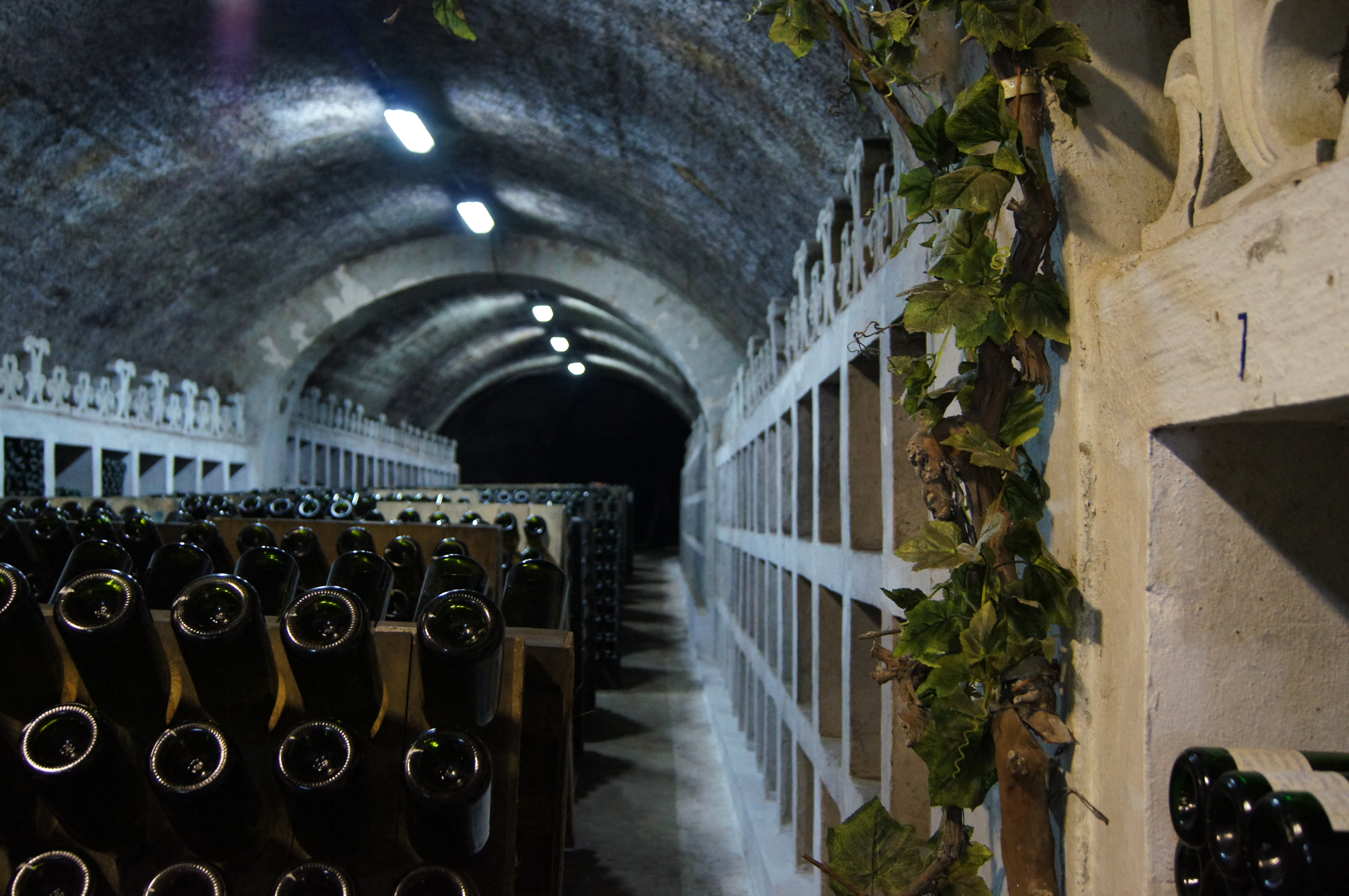
Wine storage, Winery

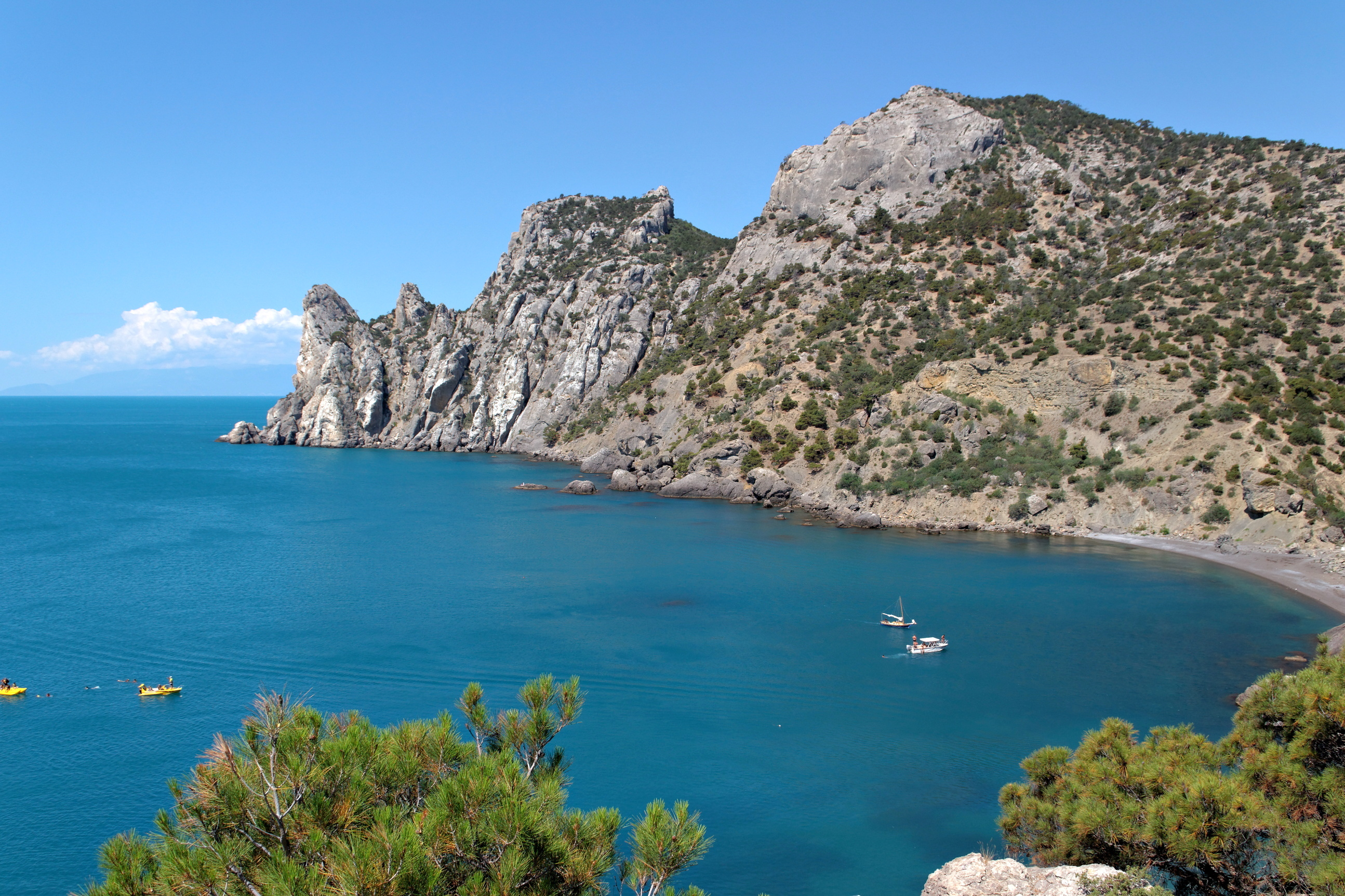
Delilimanskaya cove

== Notable people ==
- Danylo Matviienko (born 1990), Ukrainian baritone
