= Lev Golitsyn =

Russian winemaker (1845–1915)

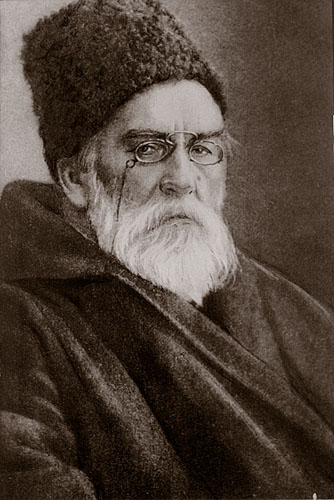
- Born: 24 August [O.S. 12 August] 1845; Lublin Governorate, Poland
- Died: 26 December [O.S. 13 December] 1915; Feodosia, Crimea, Russian Empire
- Education: University of Paris; Moscow State University
- Occupation: Winemaking
- Family: Grigory Golitsyn (brother)

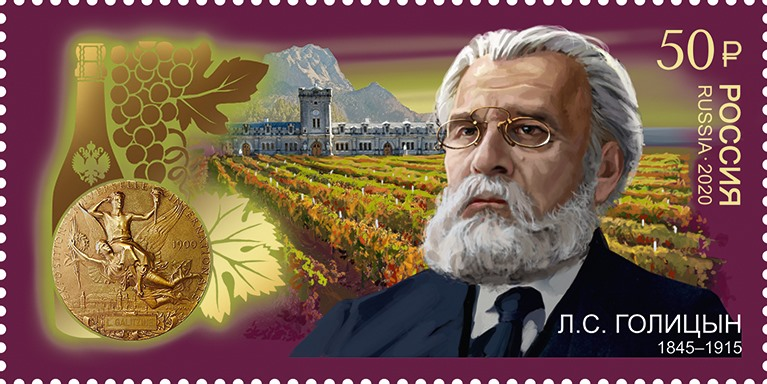
Golitsyn on a 2020 stamp of Russia

Prince Lev Sergeyevich Golitsyn (Russian: Лев Сергеевич Голицын; 24 August 1845 – 26 December 1915) was a Russian winemaker of the 1890s. He established the production of sparkling wines in Russia.

== Biography ==
Lev Sergeyevich was born into the aristocratic House of Golitsyn. After graduating from the University of Paris in 1862, between 1864 and 1867 he served as a clerical officer at the Ministry of Foreign Affairs. In 1872 he received a second degree, in law, from the Moscow State University, and from 1872 to 1874 studied in Germany. Later in the 1870s he participated in an archaeological expedition in Vladimir Directorate that discovered several Stone Age sites. In recognition for this work, in 1877 Golitsyn was elected as a corresponding member of the Moscow Archaeological Society.

In 1878 Golitsyn bought a manor house near Sudak in Crimea. There he started cultivating grapes, eventually growing up to 600 varieties. His vineyards gradually spread across Crimea into the Caucasus. In the 1880s he established the production of sparkling wines using the classical French technology of direct fermentation in bottles. He also set up the mass production of table, liqueur, and dessert wines, such as white and pink nutmeg and port wines. In Crimea, Golitsyn became an avid collector of 17th–20th century wines, eventually accumulating around 50,000 bottles.

Golitsyn's winemaking career peaked in the 1890s, when he was a leading Russian winemaker. By 1912 his fortune declined, and he donated a large part of his lands and vineyards to Nicholas II of Russia aiming to preserve them as part of the Imperial estates.
