= Hirne =

Hirne (Ukrainian: Гірне) is the name of several populated places in Ukraine.

- Hirne, Yalta Municipality, a settlement in Crimea, currently disputed between Russia and Ukraine
- Hirne, Horlivka Raion, Donetsk Oblast, a settlement in Donetsk Oblast, Ukraine
- Hirne, Khartsyzk Municipality, Donetsk Oblast, an urban-type settlement in Donetsk Oblast, Ukraine
- Hirne, Luhansk Oblast, an urban-type settlement in Luhansk Oblast, Ukraine
- Hirne, Lviv Oblast, a village in Lviv Oblast, Ukraine
- Hirne, Sumy Oblast, a village in Sumy Oblast, Ukraine

== See also ==
- Gorny (disambiguation)
