= OTMA =

Acronym used by the daughters of Nicholas II of Russia

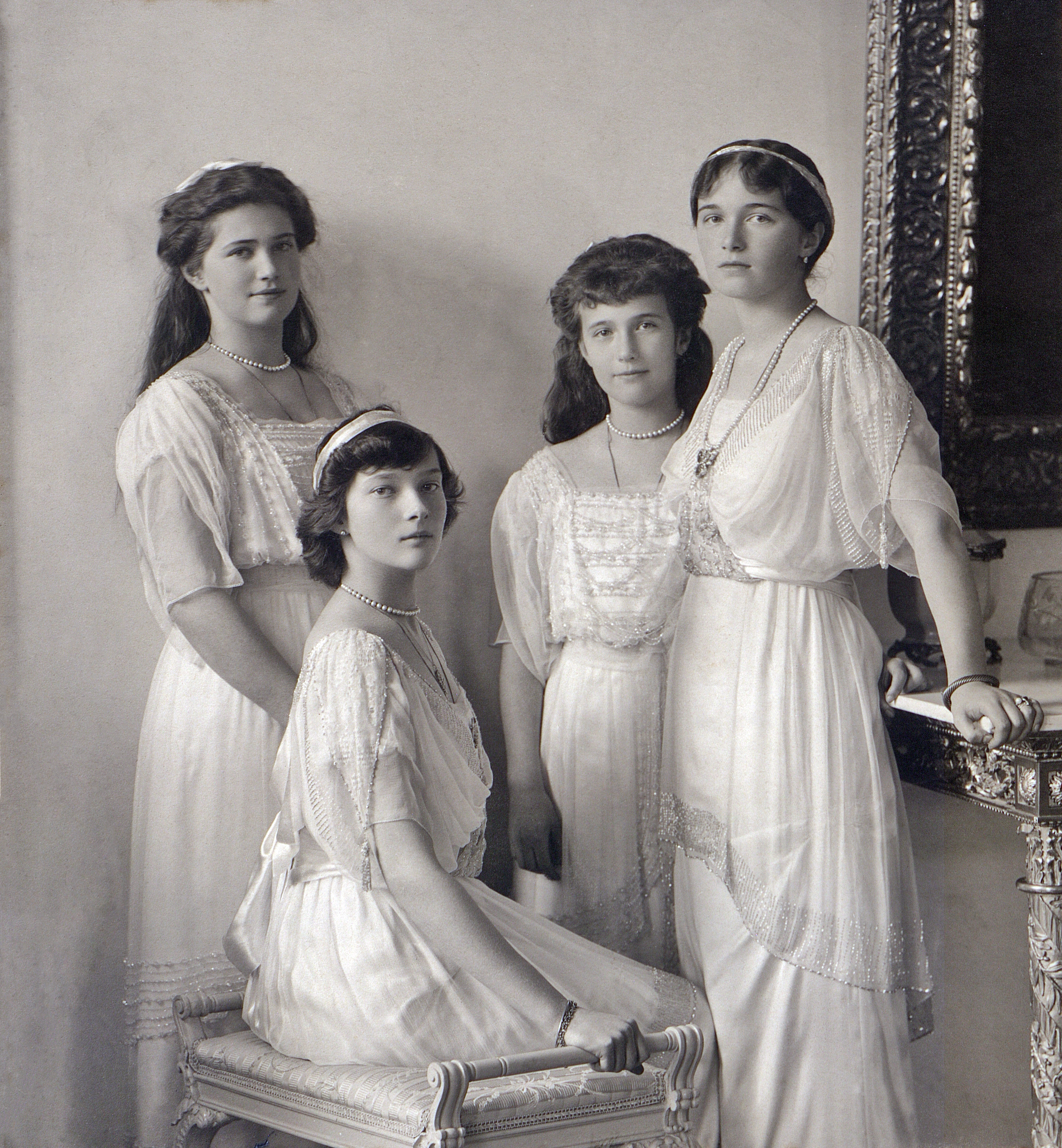
OTMA from left to right, Maria, Tatiana, Anastasia and Olga Nikolaevna in 1914.

OTMA was an acronym sometimes used by the four daughters of Emperor Nicholas II of Russia and his consort, Alexandra Feodorovna, as a group nickname for themselves, built from the first letter of each girl's name in the order of their births:

- Ольга – Olga Nikolaevna Romanova (15 November 1895 – 17 July 1918) was the eldest daughter.
- Татьяна – Tatiana Nikolaevna Romanova (10 June 1897 – 17 July 1918) was the second daughter.
- Мария – Maria Nikolaevna Romanova (26 June 1899 – 17 July 1918) was the third daughter.
- Анастасия – Anastasia Nikolaevna Romanova (18 June 1901 – 17 July 1918) was the youngest daughter.

Note that the Roman and Cyrillic forms of all four of the initial letters are identical in printed form.

== Description ==
In childhood the grand duchesses came up with ОТМА as a sign of sibling closeness and affection for one another, writing it in their diaries. Whilst the family was in captivity after the Russian Revolution of 1917 they were allowed to send few letters, and so the sisters often signed this nickname on cards they had written together for loved ones and friends.

The four girls used this acronym to further blend themselves in together: to become even more of a unit—a pack—than they already were. In addition, they were grouped into pairs: the Big Pair, composed of Grand Duchesses Olga and Tatiana and the Little Pair, composed of Grand Duchesses Maria and Anastasia. They were often dressed alike, sometimes in their individual pairs, sometimes in the whole group. It was noted that the Grand Duchesses were usually in some variation of their sisters' dress.

OTMA photographs

The OTMA sisters and Alexei doing the ring play on the Standart royal yacht, 1906.

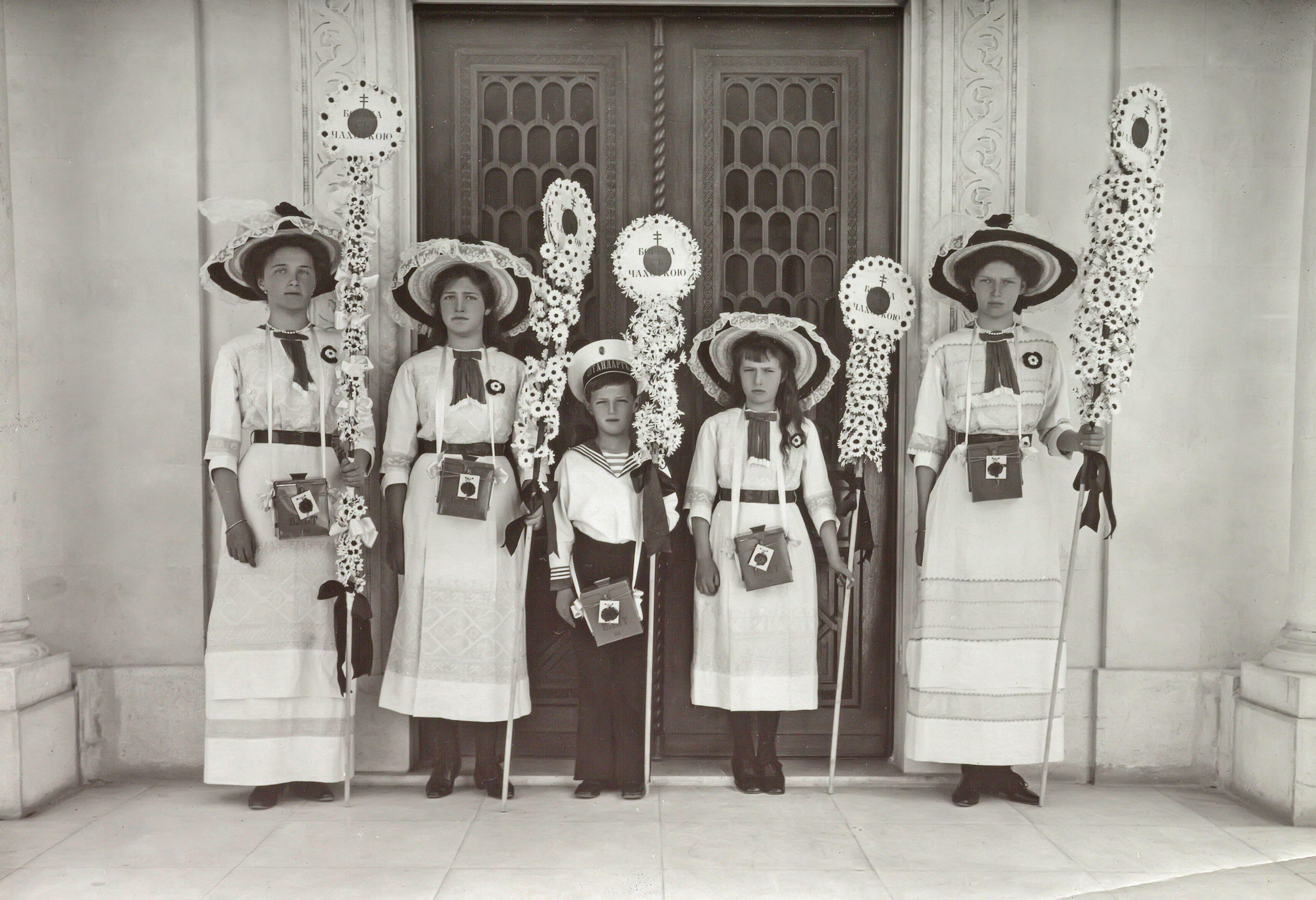
The OTMA sisters on the 1912 White Flower Day, ready to go around in Livadiya and Yalta (in Crimea) selling white flowers to people to get donations for people fighting tuberculosis.

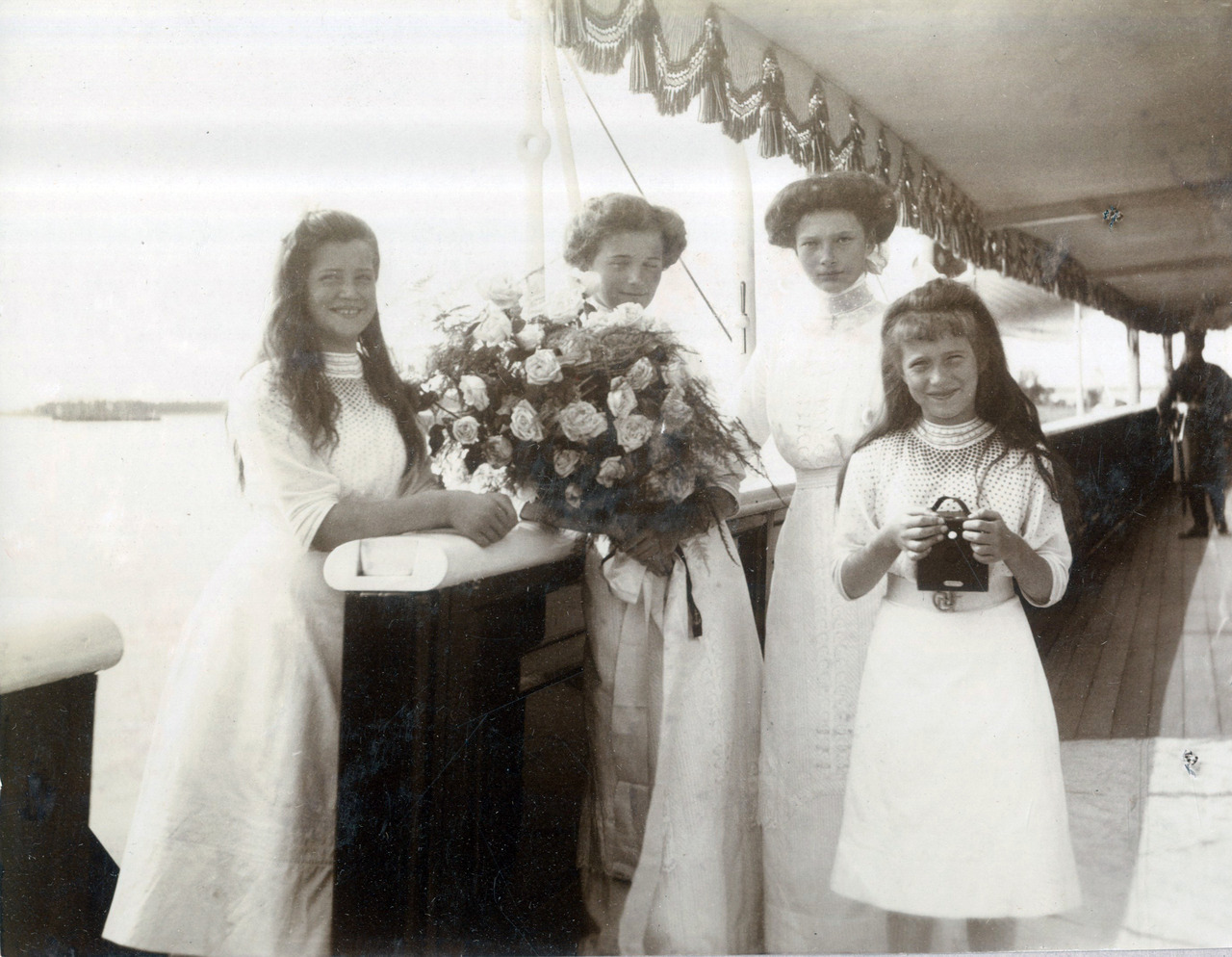
The OTMA sisters on Olga's name day (July 24, 1912) aboard the Standart. Anastasia is using a Kodak Brownie no. 2 and all the sisters were known to take thousands of photos every year (notice the swastika on Anastasia's buckle of her belt).

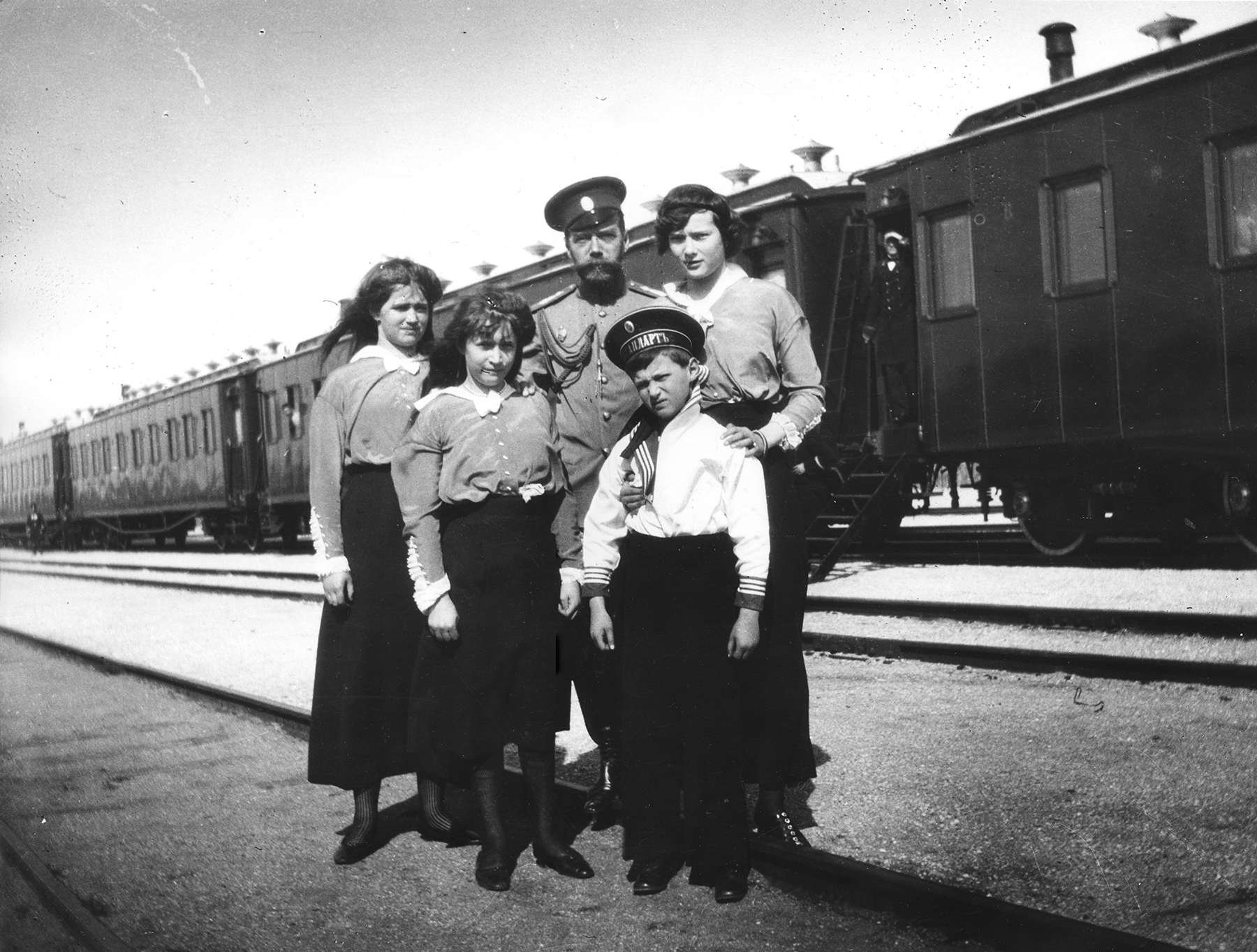
The OTMA sisters (Olga shooting) and the tsar in Pochtovoe train station, during a pause of the Russian imperial train, March 1914.

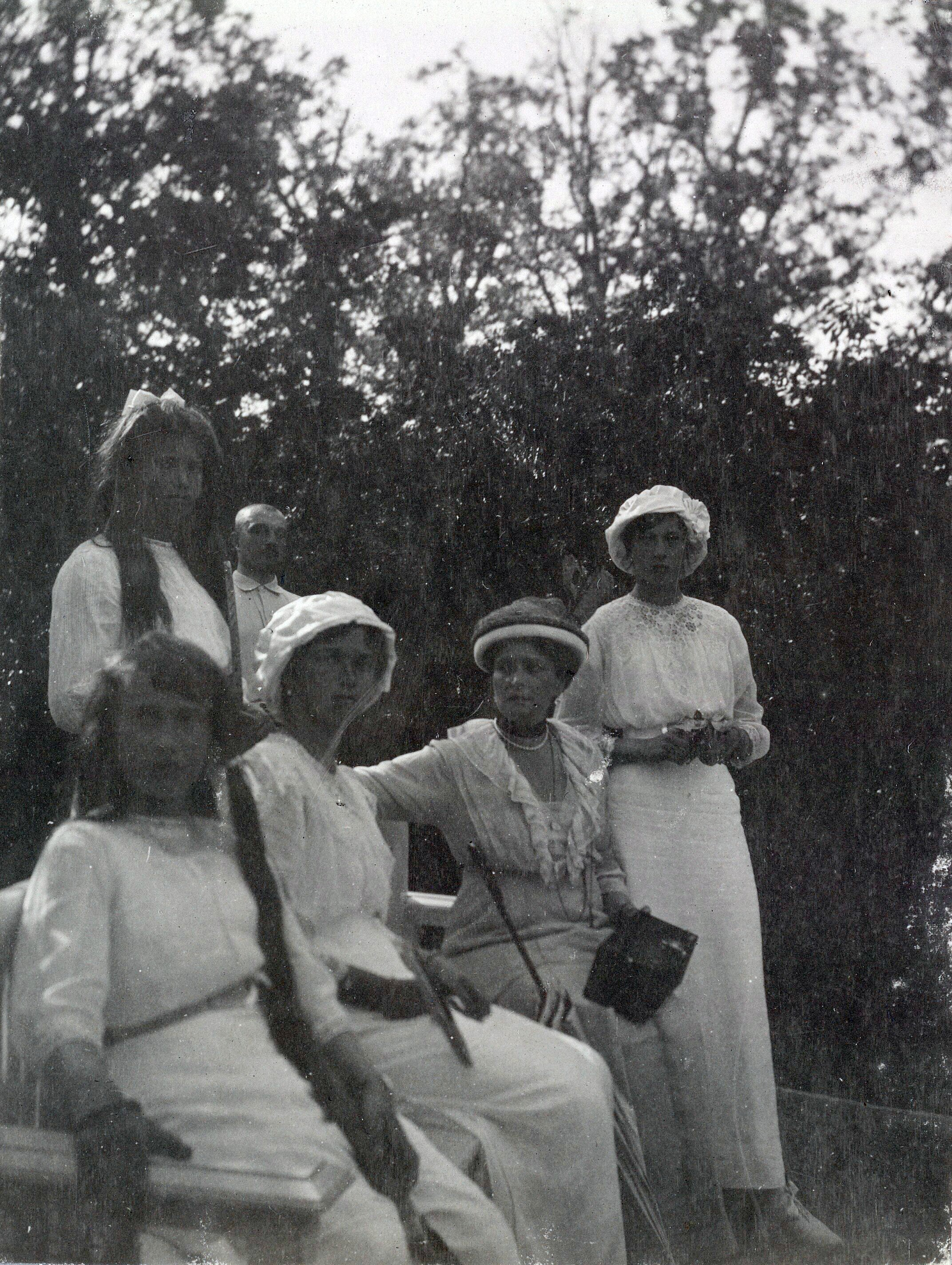
OTMA sisters with their mother, the empress Alexandra, 1914.

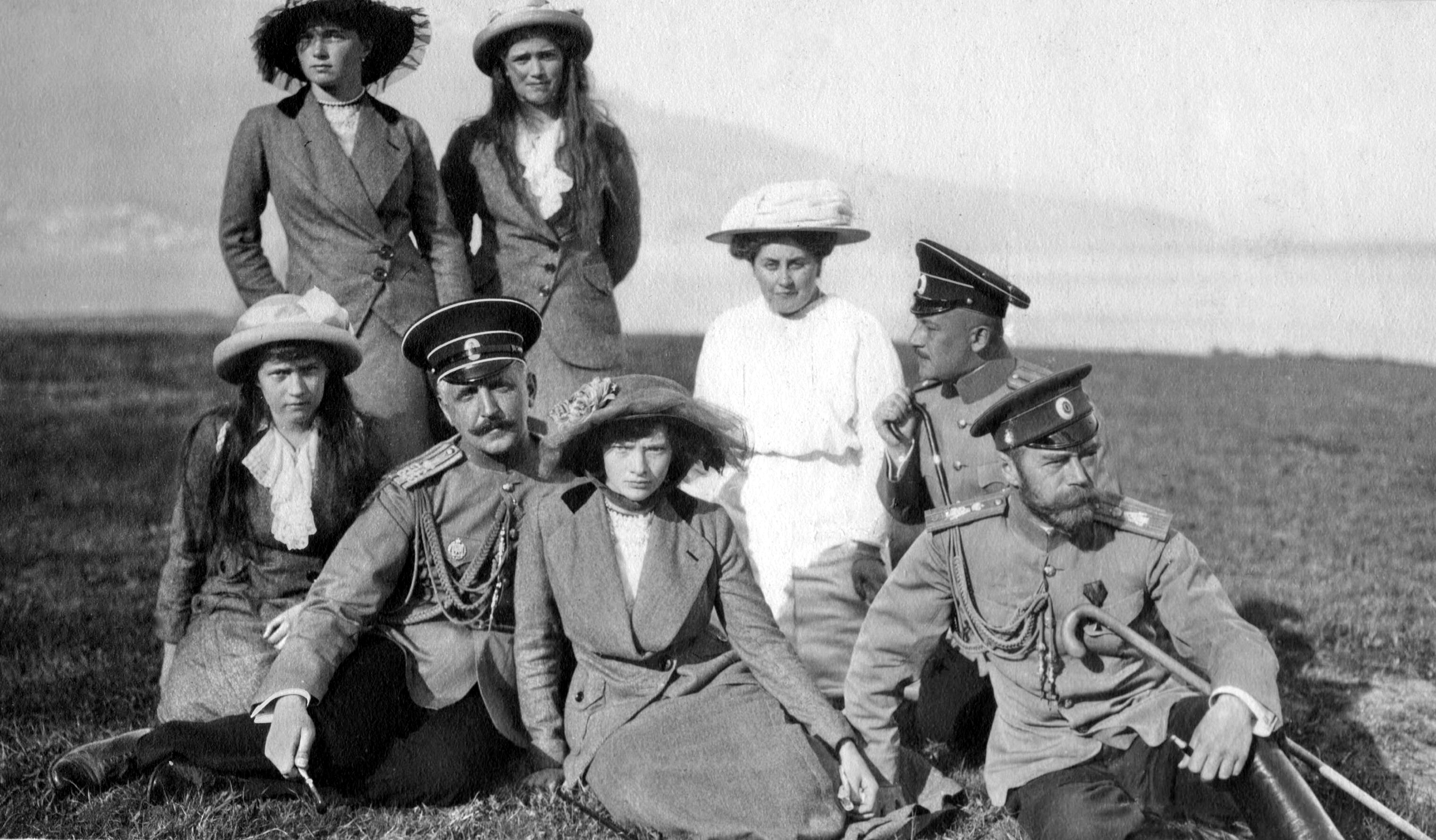
The OTMA sisters, together with their father Nicholas, Anna Vyrubova, Nikolai Sablin on a trip in Crimea, 1914

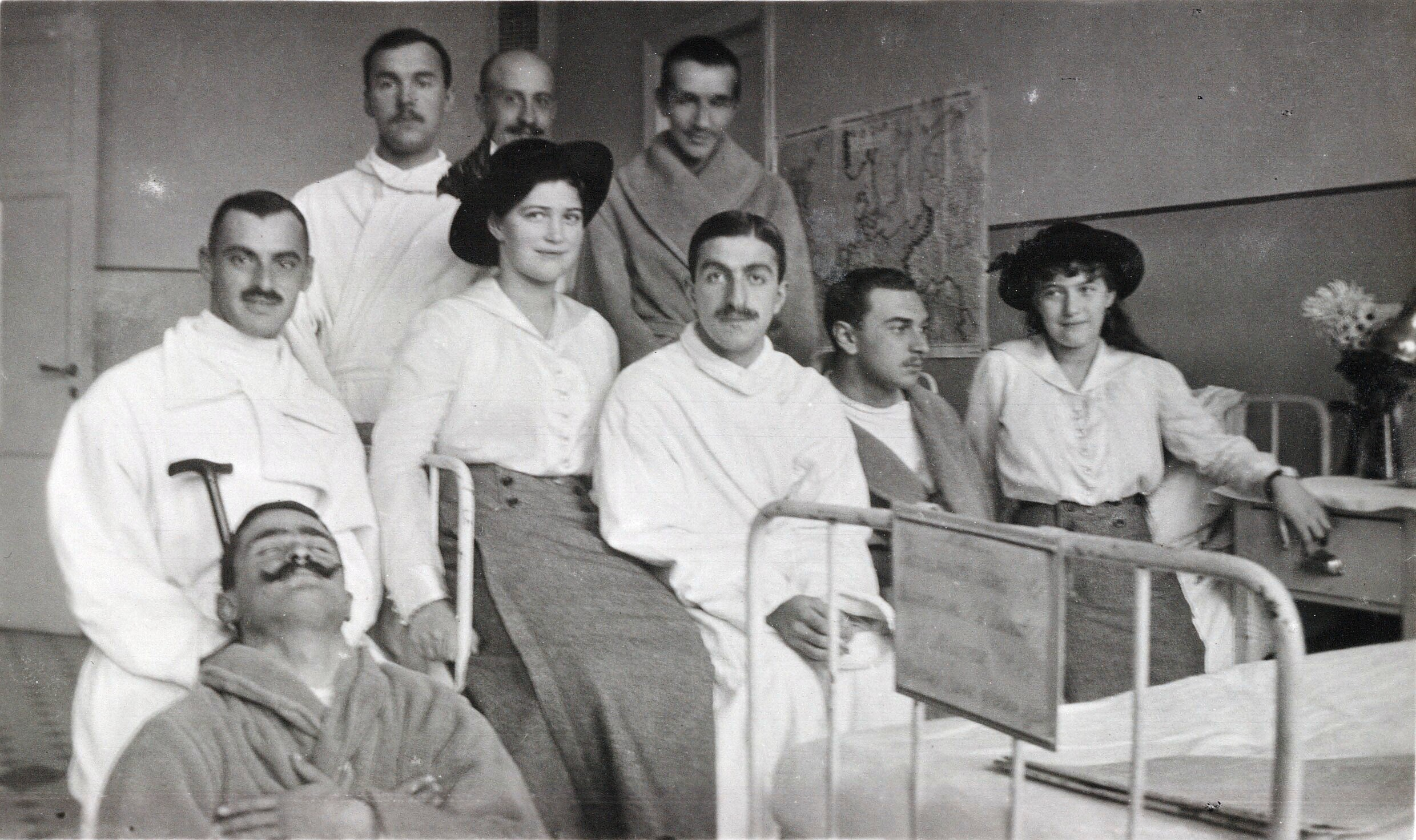
Anastasia and Maria Nikolaevna together with wounded soldiers at the hospital in Feodorovsky Gorodok, where they assisted them daily, 1915.

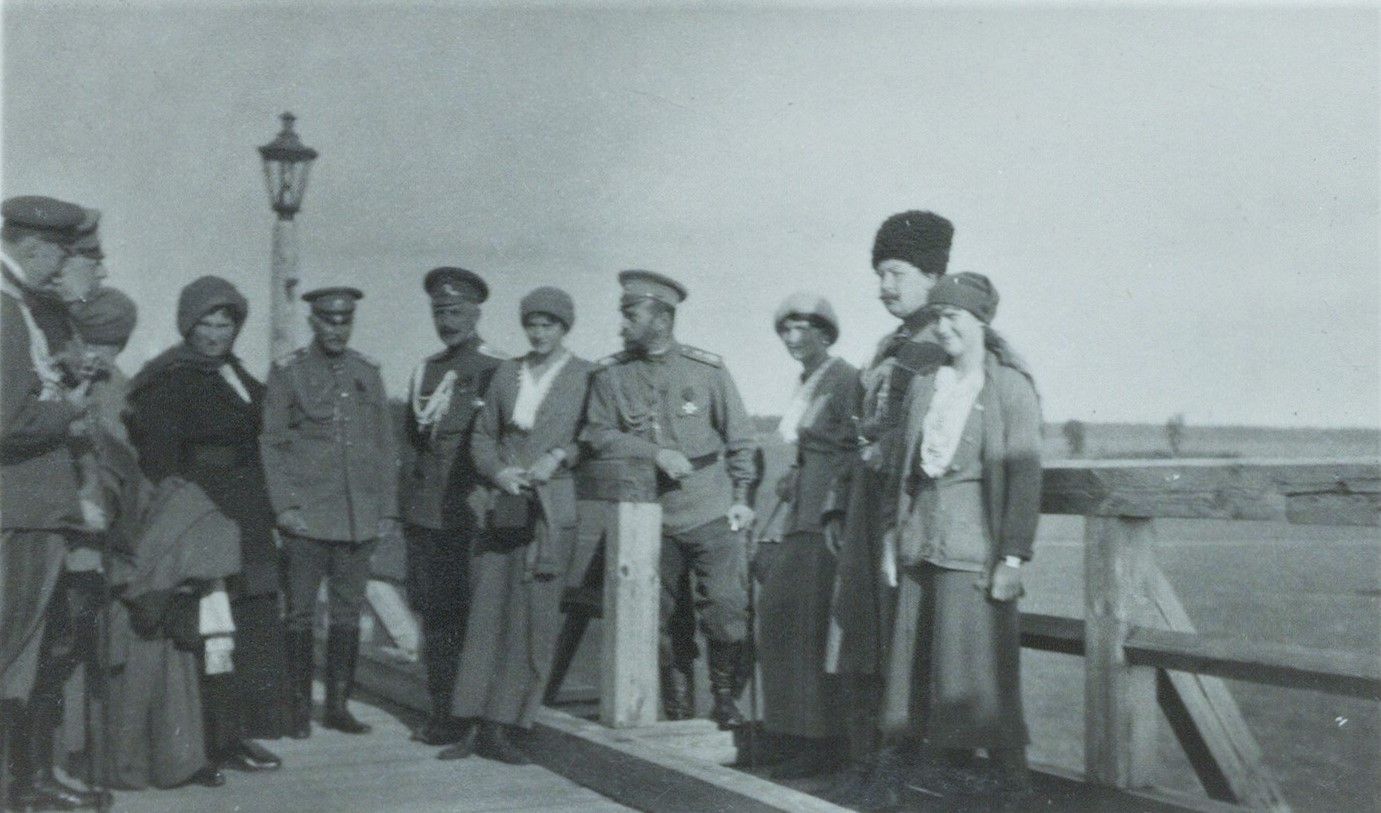
The OTMA sisters together with their parents (the tsar Nicholas II and the empress Alexandra) and some people on a bridge near Mogilev (nowadays in Belarus), where the headquarters of the Russian army were located, summer 1916.

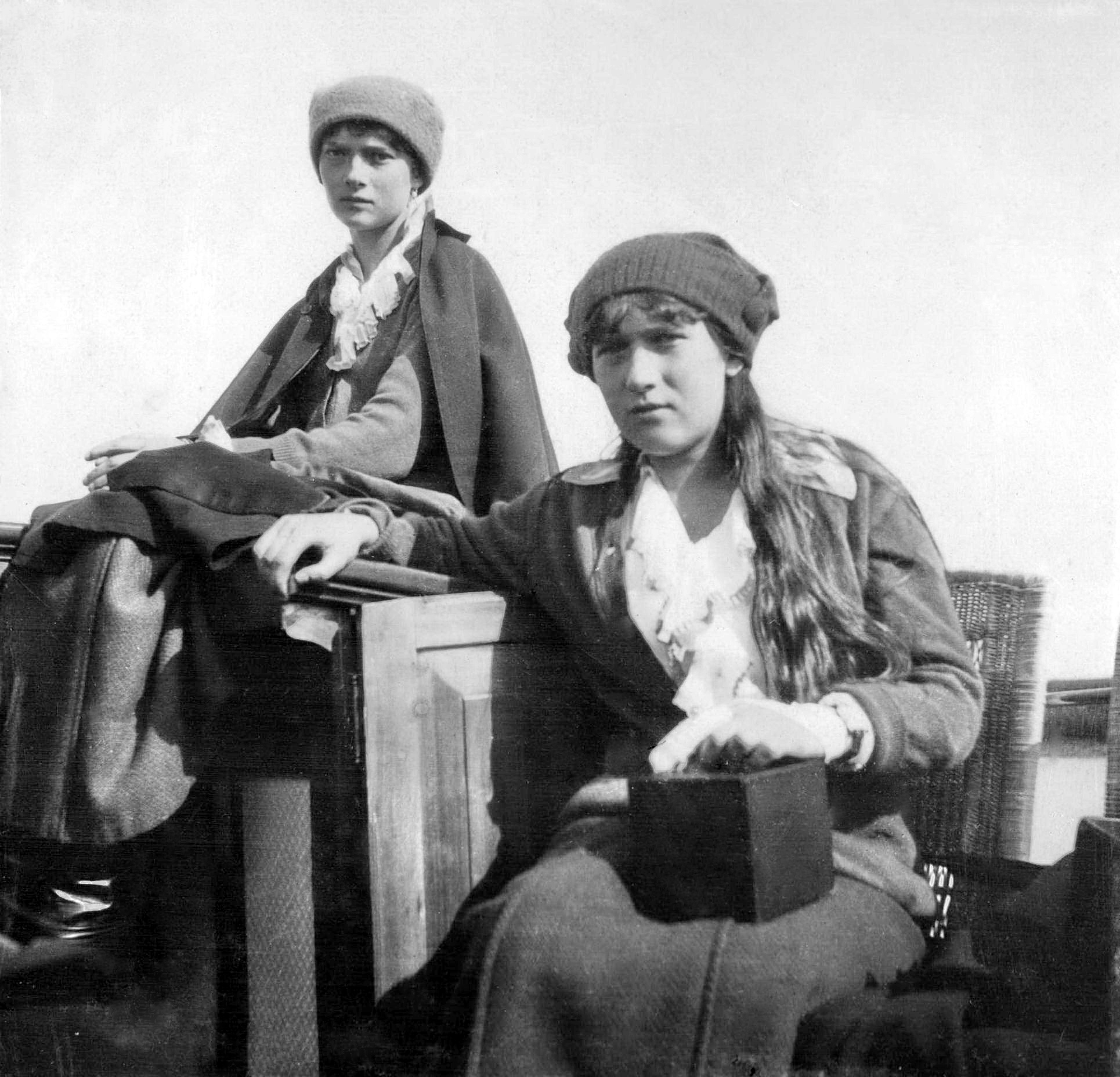
OTMA sisters on a boat on the Dnieper river near Mogilev (summer 1916): Anastasia, Tatiana...

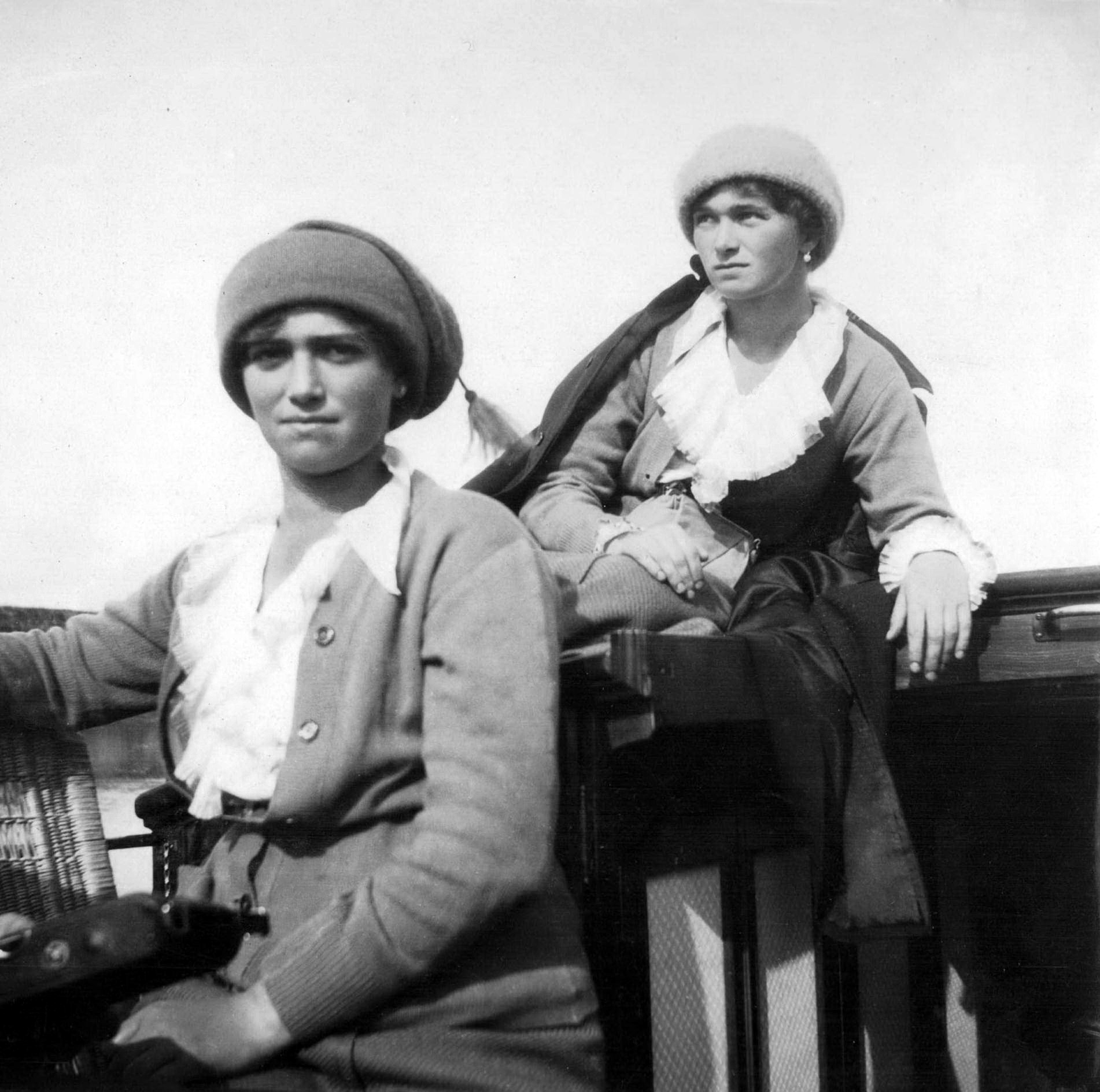
...and Maria and Olga.

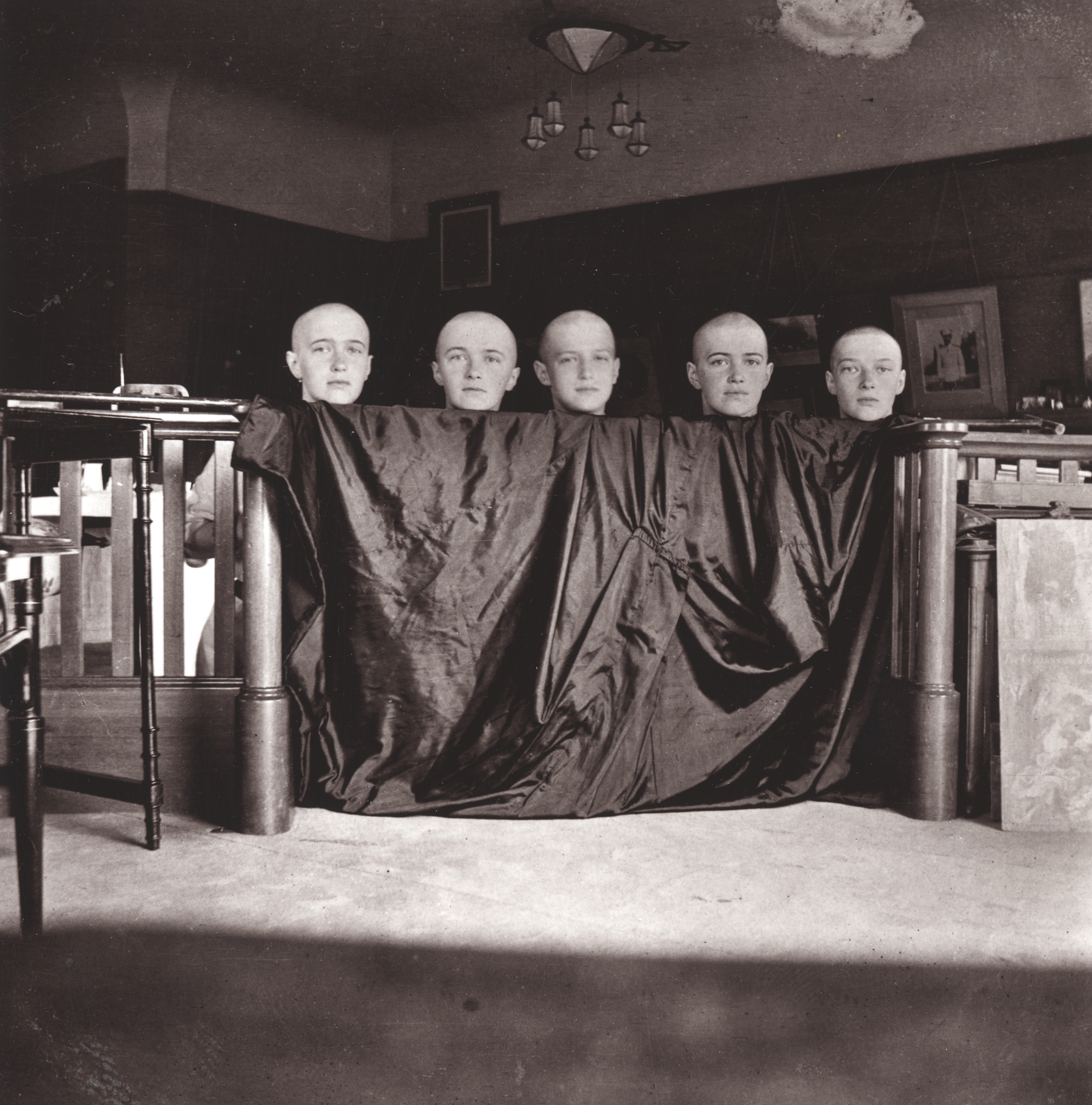
OTMA sisters and Alexei (center) in spring 1917, after having lost their hair due to measles.
