= Ponyzivka =

Ponyzivka Понизівка
- Urban-type settlement
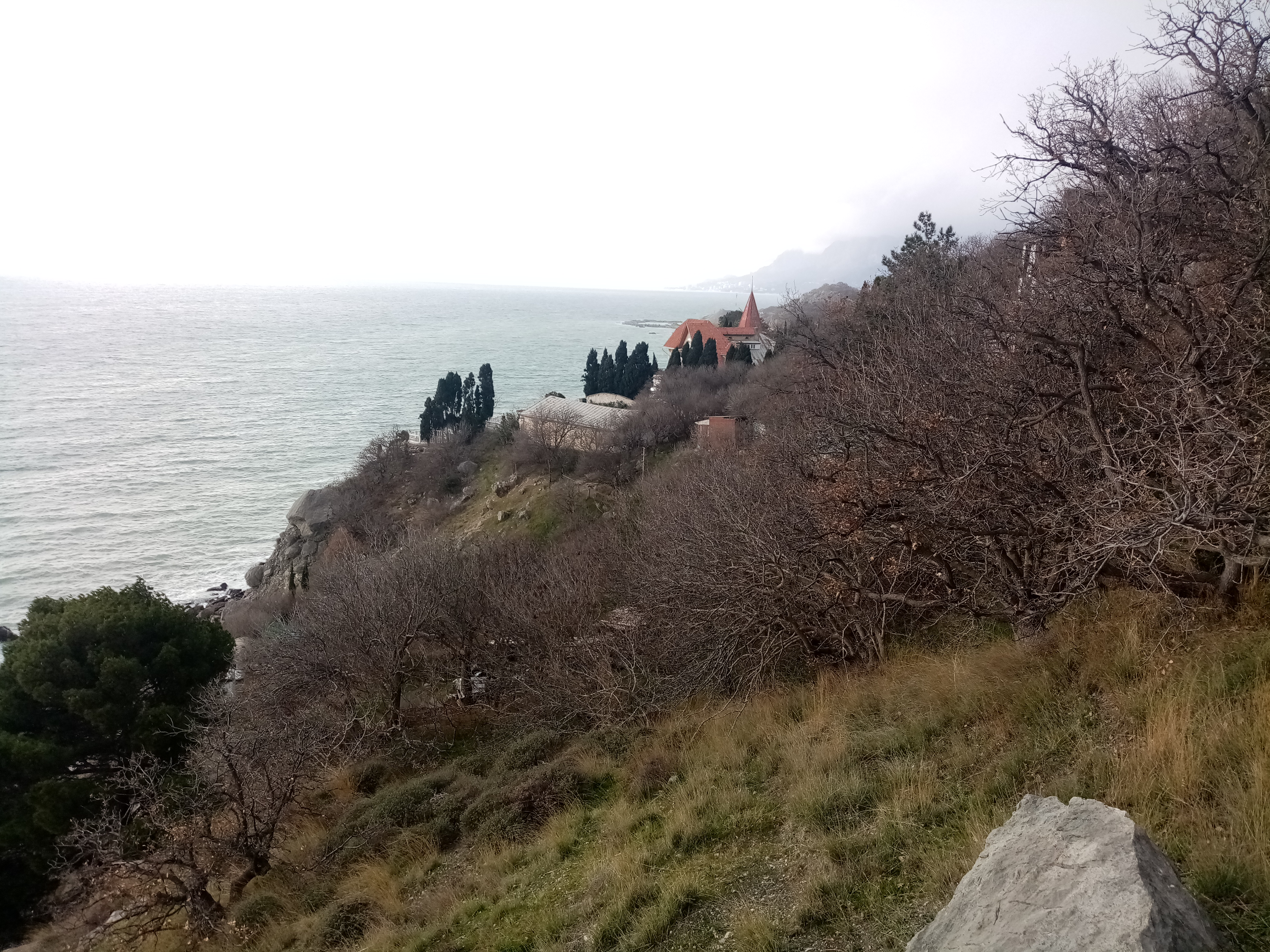

- Location of Ponyzivka in Crimea Ponyzivka (Crimea)
- Coordinates: 44°23′47″N 33°57′25″E
- Country: Ukraine
- Republic: Crimea
- Municipality: Yalta Municipality
- Town status: 1971

Area
  - Total: 1.2239 km^{2} (0.4726 sq mi)
- Elevation: 89 m (292 ft)

Population (2014)
  - Total: 213
  - Density: 174/km^{2} (451/sq mi)
- Time zone: UTC+4 (MSK)
- Postal code: 98689
- Area code: +380 654
- Climate: Cfa
- Website: http://rada.gov.ua/

Ponyzivka (Ukrainian: Понизівка; Russian: Понизовка; Crimean Tatar: Aşağı Kikineiz) is an urban-type settlement in the Yalta Municipality of the Autonomous Republic of Crimea, a territory recognized by a majority of countries as part of Ukraine and annexed by Russia as the Republic of Crimea.

Ponyzivka is located on Crimea's southern shore at an elevation of 89 metres (292 ft). The settlement is located 5 km (3.1 mi) from Simeiz, which it is administratively subordinate to. Its population was 361 in the 2001 Ukrainian census. Current population: 213 (2014 Census).

== History ==
On the site of the village, on Cape Trinity, in ancient times there was a Taurian settlement (late 1st century BC – early 1st century AD). This is evidenced by a whole complex of archaeological monuments – dolmens, burial grounds. Later the settlement was destroyed.

In the 8th–10th centuries, there was a fortified monastery on Cape Trinity, known as Kuchuk-Isar. A significant part of the lands west of Simeiz was owned by General F. Revelioti, commander of the Balaklava Border Battalion, whose headquarters were in the village of Kikeneiz (now the village of Opolzneve).

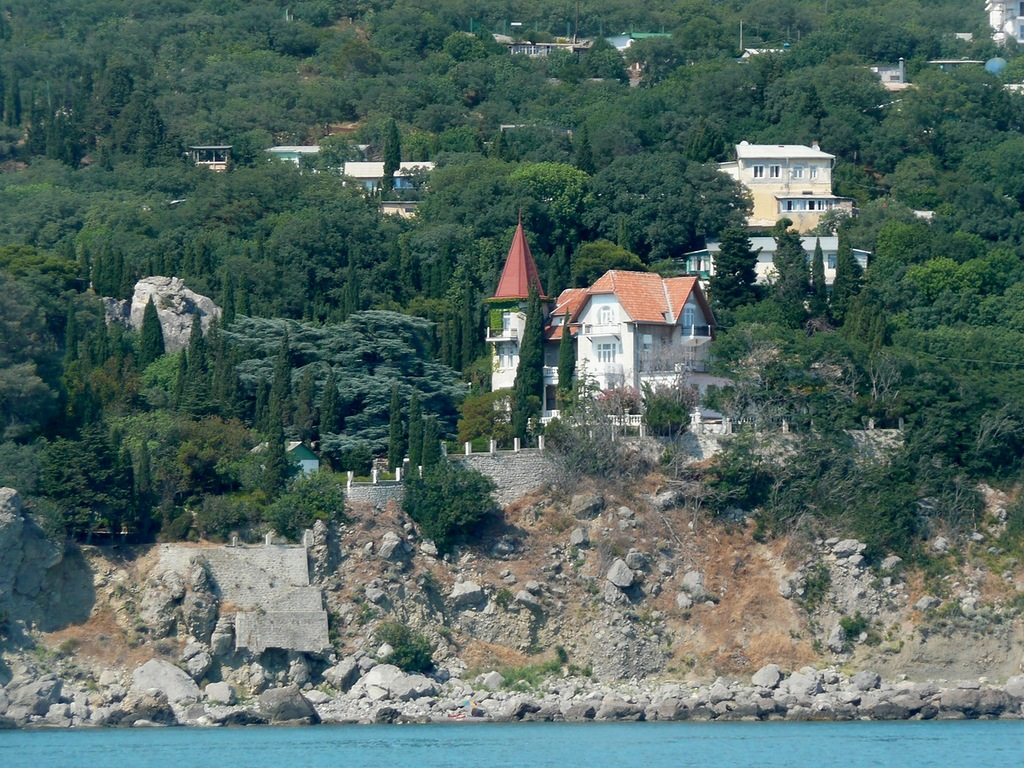
Former dacha of Ponizovkin, now building No. 7 of the Ponizovka sanatorium

In 1830, General Revelioti (Ревелиоти, Феодосий) built the "Holy Trinity" dacha here, which is located on the site of the modern village, approximately within the same territorial boundaries. In the middle of the 19th century. The "Holy Trinity" dacha was inherited by the general's son, A. Revelioti, who in 1886 sold the estate at auction. The central part was purchased by the Alekseevsky Mining Society, the eastern part by the artist Arkhip Kuindzhi, and the western part by E. Alchevska. Arkhip Kuindzhi's estate is located in the Tartyr ridge, between present-day Ponizivka and Katsiveli, and was called "Nanilkh-Chukhur" (Mint Ravine) with a famous beach and the Uzun-Tash stone, which the artist depicted in various sketches and paintings.

In 1903, the Alekseevsky Mining Society divided its part of the estate into 103 plots for sale to individual developers. The former Revelioti estate is now used by the Ponizivka sanatorium complex. Also located here are the sports and recreation complex of the Kherson Institute of Physical Culture, the sanatorium of the Ministry of Civil Aviation, and the sanatorium complex "Zir Ukrainy".
