= Kuibysheve, Yalta =

Kuibysheve Куйбишеве
- Rural settlement
- Interactive map of Kuibysheve
- Location of Kuibysheve in Crimea
- Coordinates: 44°29′50″N 34°06′35″E
- Republic: Crimea
- Municipality: Yalta Municipality
- Elevation: 232 m (761 ft)

Population (2014)
  - Total: 67
- Time zone: UTC+4 (MSK)
- Postal code: 98655
- Area code: +380 654
- Website: http://rada.gov.ua/

Kuibysheve (Ukrainian: Куйбишеве; Russian: Куйбышево) is a rural settlement in the Yalta Municipality of the Autonomous Republic of Crimea, a territory recognized by a majority of countries as part of Ukraine and annexed by Russia as the Republic of Crimea.

In 1928, the settlement was known as the Isar village (Crimean Tatar: İsar), belonging to the Ay Vasil Settlement Council of the Yalta Raion. Following the forced deportation of the Crimean Tatars in 1944, the Presidium of the Supreme Soviet of the Russian SFSR published a decree on May 18, 1948 renaming the settlement along with many others throughout Crimea from their native Crimean Tatar names to their current variants.

Kuibysheve is located on Crimea's southern shore at an elevation of 232 metres (761 ft). The settlement is located 5 km (3.1 mi) from Yalta. Its population was 62 in the 2001 Ukrainian census. Current population: 67 (2014 Census).
