= List of international presidential trips made by Petru Lucinschi =

This is a list of international trips made by Petru Lucinschi, the 2nd President of Moldova (15 January 1997 – 7 April 2001).

During his term in office he made:

- One visit to Netherlands, France, Azerbaijan, Georgia, Spain, Belgium, Bulgaria, Poland, Uzbekistan, Switzerland, Slovenia, United States, Kazakhstan and China.
- Two visits to Israel and Belarus.
- Three visits to Turkey, Russia and Romania.
- Four visits to Ukraine.

== 1997 ==
#	Country	Location	Date	Notes
1	Russia	Moscow	24 February	
2	Turkey	Ankara	28–29 April	
3	Russia	Moscow	8 May	Met with Igor Smirnov
4	Netherlands	The Hague	28 May	50th anniversary of the Marshall Plan
5	Israel	Tel Aviv	22–24 June	
6	Spain	Madrid	9 July	
7	France	Paris	7–9 September	
8	Azerbaijan	Baku	27 November	
8	Georgia	Tbilisi	28–29 November	

== 1998 ==
#	Country	Location	Date	Notes
9	Belgium	Brussels	26 January	
10	Romania	Galați	24 February	
11	Bulgaria	Sofia	15–16 September	
12	Romania	Bucharest	October	
13	Poland	Warsaw	27–28 October	
13	Turkey	Ankara	29 October	Republic Day celebrations
14	Uzbekistan	Tashkent	17–18 December	

== 1999 ==
#	Country	Location	Date	Notes
15	Switzerland	Bern	13–14 January	
16	Slovenia	Ljubljana	March	
17	United States	Washington, D.C.	23–25 April	1999 Washington summit
18	Ukraine	Kyiv	19 July	
19	Ukraine	Kyiv	18–19 August	
20	Kazakhstan	Astana	September	
21	Turkey	Instanbul	18–19 November	1999 Istanbul summit
22	Ukraine	Kyiv	30 November	Inauguration of Leonid Kuchma.

== 2000 ==
#	Country	Location	Date	Notes
23	Israel	Tel Aviv	5–7 January	
24	China	Beijing	7–12 June	
25	Belarus	Minsk	29–30 June	
26	Russia	Moscow	28 July	
27	Ukraine	Olyva	16 August	
28	Belarus	Minsk	30 November–1 December	

== 2001 ==
#	Country	Location	Date	Notes
29	Romania	Vaslui	9 February	
