= Liniine =

Liniine Лінійне
- Rural settlement
- Location of Liniine in Crimea
- Coordinates: 44°31′50″N 34°15′30″E
- Republic: Crimea
- Municipality: Yalta Municipality
- Elevation: 216 m (709 ft)

Population (2014)
  - Total: 30
- Time zone: UTC+4 (MSK)
- Postal code: 98640
- Area code: +380 654
- Website: http://rada.gov.ua/

Liniine (Ukrainian: Лінійне; Russian: Линейное; Crimean Tatar: Lineynoye) is a rural settlement in the Yalta Municipality of the Autonomous Republic of Crimea, a territory recognized by a majority of countries as part of Ukraine and annexed by Russia as the Republic of Crimea.

Liniine is located on Crimea's southern shore at an elevation of 216 metres (709 ft). The settlement is located 5 km (3.1 mi) southwest from Hurzuf, which it is administratively subordinate to. Its population was 31 in the 2001 Ukrainian census. Current population: 30 (2014 Census).
