= Gorny =

Gorny/Górny (masculine), Gornaya/Górna (feminine), or Gornoye/Górne (neuter) may refer to:

== Places ==
- Gorny District, a district of the Sakha Republic, Russia
- Gorny (inhabited locality) (Gornaya, Gornoye), name of several inhabited localities in Russia
- Gorny (air base)
- Gorny Camp Directorate of Gulag
- Gornoye (Krasnodar Krai), Russia

== Other ==
- Gorny (surname)
- Gorny Institute, common name of the National Mineral Resources University

== See also ==
- Gorny Institute, a stratovolcano named after the university
