= Vysokohirne =

Vysokohirne is a place name which can refer to:

- Vysokohirne, Yalta Municipality, Crimea
- Vysokohirne, Zaporizhzhia Raion, Zaporizhzhia Oblast, Ukraine
