= Gorny (air base) =

- IATA: none; ICAO: ZFB6

Summary
- Airport type: Military
- Operator: abandoned
- Location: Gorny, Krasnopartizansky District, Saratov Oblast
- Elevation AMSL: 476 ft / 145 m
- Coordinates: 51°45′0″N 048°38′0″E
- Interactive map of Gorny

Runways
Direction	Length		Surface
Direction	ft	m	Surface
	6,562	2,000

Gorny was an air base located 7 kilometers (4.3 mi) southeast of the work settlement of Gorny in Krasnopartizansky District of Saratov Oblast, Russia. It is a military base from the Cold War which has since been plowed under into farmland.
