= Sovietske =

Sovietske Совєтське
- Urban-type settlement
- Interactive map of Sovietske
- Location of Sovietske in Crimea
- Coordinates: 44°31′53″N 34°11′17″E
- Republic: Crimea
- Raion: Yalta Raion
- Founded: 1929
- Town status: 1971

Area
  - Total: 0.326 km^{2} (0.126 sq mi)
- Elevation: 458 m (1,503 ft)

Population (2014)
  - Total: 670
  - Density: 2,100/km^{2} (5,300/sq mi)
- Time zone: UTC+4 (MSK)
- Postal code: 98653
- Area code: +380 654
- Website: http://rada.gov.ua/

Sovietske (Ukrainian: Совєтське; Russian: Советское) or Dolossy (Ukrainian: Долосси; Crimean Tatar: Dolossı) is an urban-type settlement in the Yalta Municipality of the Autonomous Republic of Crimea, a territory recognized by a majority of countries as part of Ukraine and annexed by Russia as the Republic of Crimea.

The settlement was first founded in 1929 after the creation of the "Dolossi" resort hotel. Sovietske is located on Crimea's southern shore at an elevation of 458 metres (1,503 ft). It is administratively subordinate to the Massandra Settlement Council. Its population was 511 in the 2001 Ukrainian census. Current population: 670 (2014 Census).

== Demographics ==
Distribution of the population by native language according to the 2001 Ukrainian census

Language	Percentage
Russian	53.2%
Ukrainian	46.4%
other/undecided	0.4%
