= Chistopolsky =

Chistopolsky (masculine), Chistopolskaya (feminine), or Chistopolskoye (neuter) may refer to:

- Chistopolsky District, a district of the Republic of Tatarstan, Russia
- Chistopolsky (rural locality) (Chistopolskaya, Chistopolskoye), name of several rural localities in Russia
