= Danylivka =

Rural settlement in Crimea

Danylivka Данилівка
- Rural settlement
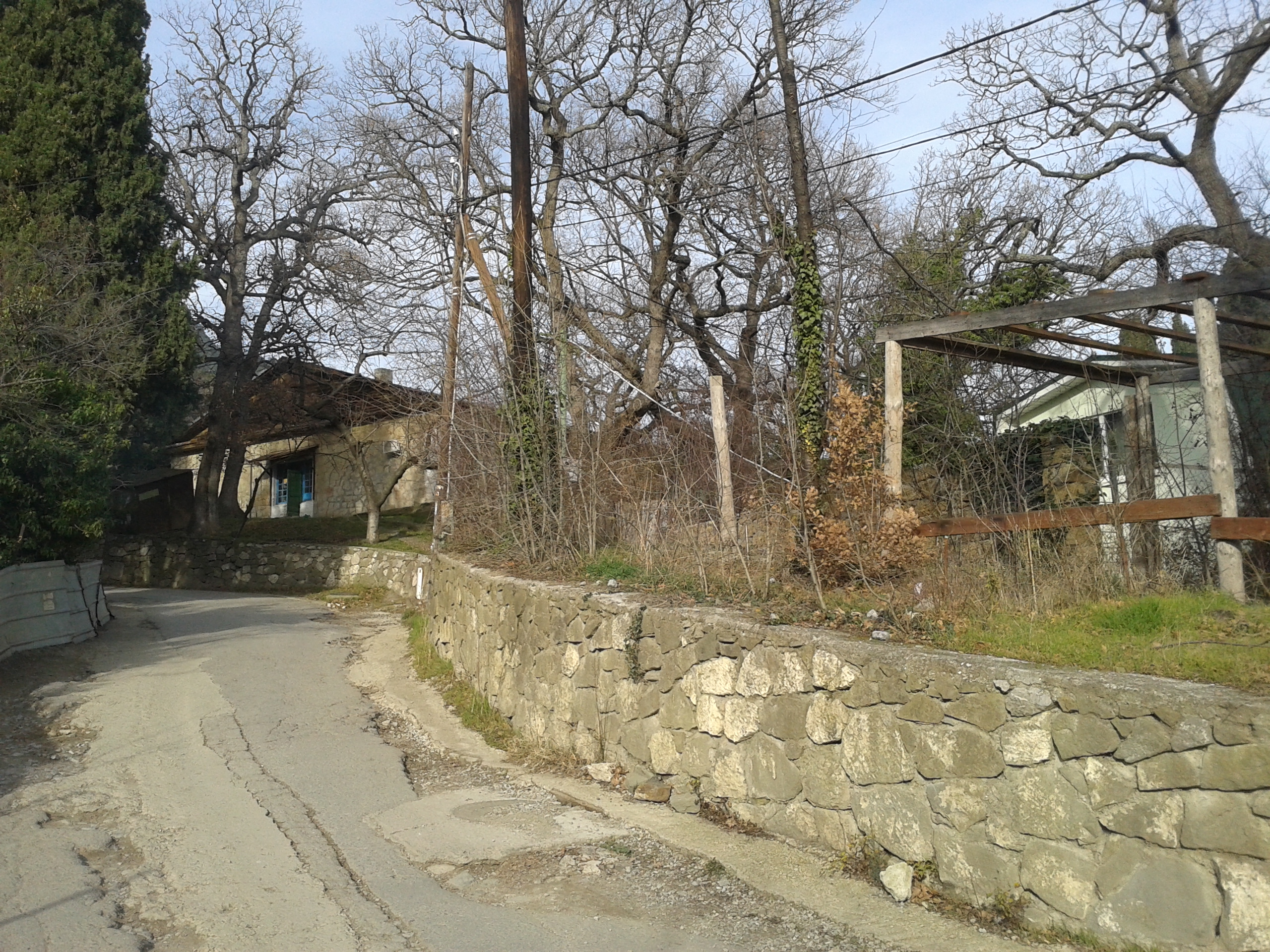

- Location of Danylivka in Crimea
- Coordinates: 44°31′21″N 34°15′29″E
- Republic: Crimea
- Municipality: Yalta Municipality
- Elevation: 134 m (440 ft)

Population (2014)
  - Total: 454
- Time zone: UTC+4 (MSK)
- Postal code: 98647
- Area code: +380 654
- Website: http://rada.gov.ua/

Danylivka (Ukrainian: Данилівка; Russian: Даниловка) is a rural settlement in the Yalta Municipality of the Autonomous Republic of Crimea, a territory recognized by a majority of countries as part of Ukraine and annexed by Russia as the Republic of Crimea.

In 1928, the settlement was known as the Ay Danil sovkhoz (Ukrainian: Ай-Даніль; Crimean Tatar: Ay Danil, probably from medieval Greek Άη Δανιήλ, Ai-Daniyl, Saint Daniel), belonging to the Hurzuf Settlement Council of the Yalta Raion. Following the forced deportation of the Crimean Tatars in 1944, the Presidium of the Supreme Soviet of the Russian SFSR published a decree on May 18, 1948 renaming the settlement along with many others throughout Crimea from their native Crimean Tatar names to their current variants.

Danylivka is located on Crimea's southern shore at an elevation of 134 metres (440 ft). The settlement is located 6 km (3.7 mi) southeast from Hurzuf, which it is administratively subordinate to. Its population was 474 in the 2001 Ukrainian census. The current population is 454 (2014 Census).
