= Partyzanske =

Partyzanske Партизанське
- Rural settlement
- Location of Partyzanske in Crimea
- Coordinates: 44°33′24″N 34°14′56″E
- Republic: Crimea
- Municipality: Yalta Municipality

Area
  - Total: 2.23 km^{2} (0.86 sq mi)
- Elevation: 362 m (1,188 ft)

Population (2014)
  - Total: 65
  - Density: 29/km^{2} (75/sq mi)
- Time zone: UTC+4 (MSK)
- Postal code: 98640
- Area code: +380 654
- Website: http://rada.gov.ua/

Partyzanske (Ukrainian: Партизанське; Russian: Партизанское; Crimean Tatar: Partizanskoye) is a rural settlement in the Yalta Municipality of the Autonomous Republic of Crimea, a territory recognized by a majority of countries as part of Ukraine and annexed by Russia as the Republic of Crimea.

Partyzanske is located on Crimea's southern shore at an elevation of 362 metres (1,188 ft). The settlement is located 5 km (3.1 mi) southwest from Hurzuf, which it is administratively subordinate to. Its population was 94 in the 2001 Ukrainian census. Current population: 65 (2014 Census).
