= Hirne, Yalta Municipality =

Hirne Гірне
- Rural settlement
- Location of Hirne in Crimea
- Coordinates: 44°28′32″N 34°07′52″E
- Republic: Crimea
- Municipality: Yalta Municipality
- Elevation: 308 m (1,010 ft)

Population (2014)
  - Total: 147
- Time zone: UTC+4 (MSK)
- Postal code: 98655
- Area code: +380 654
- Website: http://rada.gov.ua/

Hirne (Ukrainian: Гірне; Russian: Горное) is a rural settlement in the Yalta Municipality of the Autonomous Republic of Crimea, a territory recognized by a majority of countries as part of Ukraine and annexed by Russia as the Republic of Crimea.

Previously, the settlement was known as the Eriklik (Crimean Tatar: Eriklik) village Following the forced deportation of the Crimean Tatars in 1944, the Presidium of the Supreme Soviet of the Russian SFSR published a decree on May 18, 1948 renaming the settlement along with many others throughout Crimea from their native Crimean Tatar names to their current variants.

Hirne is located on Crimea's southern shore at an elevation of 308 metres (1,010 ft). The settlement is located 4.5 km (2.8 mi) from Livadiya, which it is administratively subordinate to. Its population was 85 in the 2001 Ukrainian census. Current population: 147 (2014 Census).
