= Olyva =

Olyva Олива
- Rural settlement
- Location of Olyva in Crimea Olyva (Ukraine)
- Coordinates: 44°24′52″N 33°52′03″E
- Country: Ukraine
- Autonomous republic: AR Crimea
- Municipality: Yalta Municipality

Area
  - Total: 2.23 km^{2} (0.86 sq mi)
- Elevation: 286 m (938 ft)

Population (2014)
  - Total: 379
  - Density: 170/km^{2} (440/sq mi)
- Time zone: UTC+4 (MSK)
- Postal code: 98691
- Area code: +380 654
- Website: http://rada.gov.ua/

Olyva (Ukrainian: Олива; Russian: Олива; Crimean Tatar: Oliva) is a rural settlement in the Yalta Municipality of the Autonomous Republic of Crimea, a territory recognized by a majority of countries as part of Ukraine and annexed by Russia as the Republic of Crimea.

Olyva is located on Crimea's southern shore at an elevation of 286 metres (938 ft). The settlement is located 8 km (5.0 mi) southwest from Foros, which it is administratively subordinate to. Its population was 98 in the 2001 Ukrainian census. Current population: 379 (2014 Census).

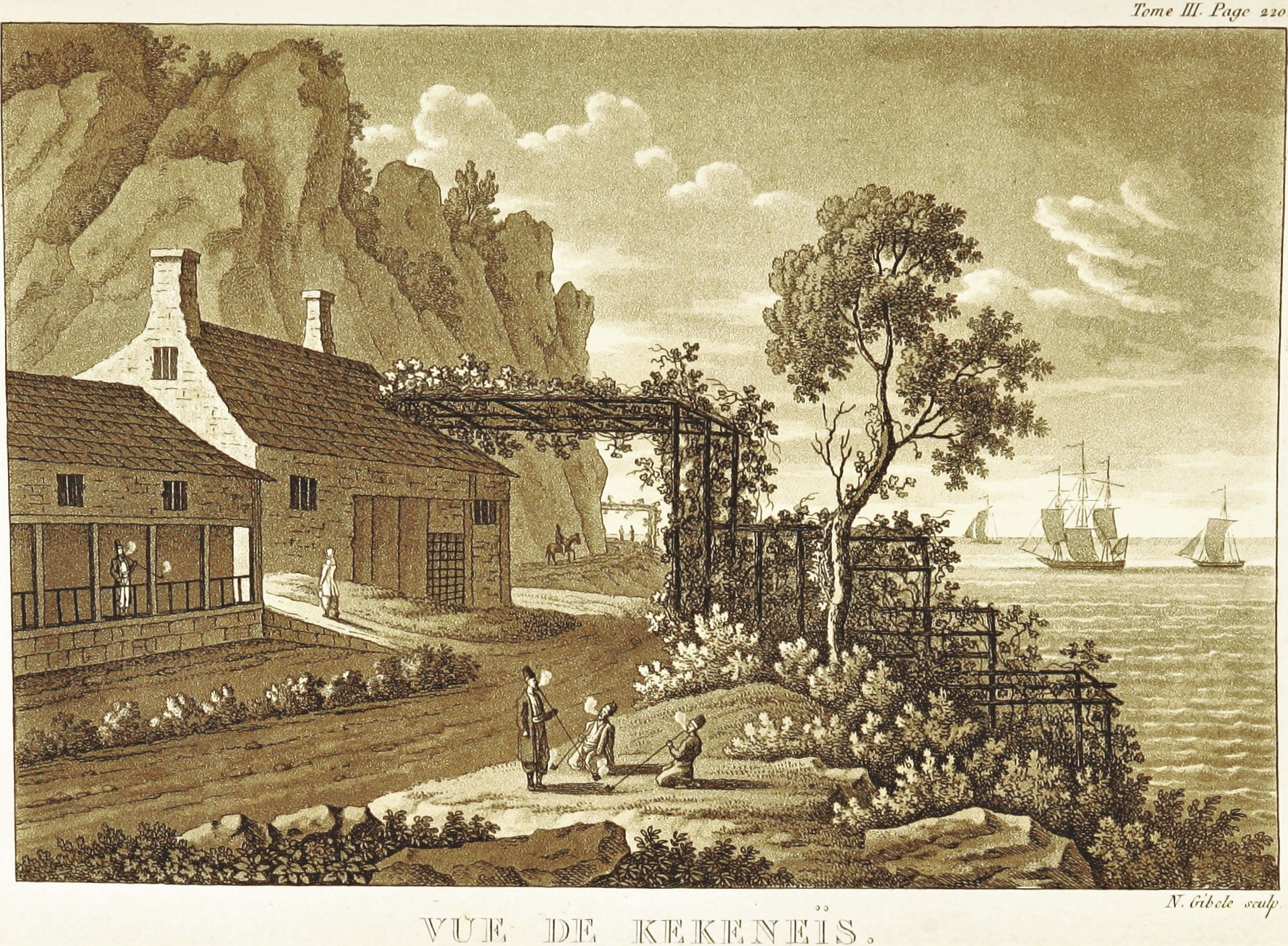
Olyva-Kekeneis in the 1820th.
