= Gorny (surname) =

Gorny is a surname. Notable people with the surname include:

- Frédéric Gorny (born 1973), French actor
- Jan Górny (1907–1945), Polish boxer
- Jan Górny (1933–2018), Polish field hockey player
- Józef Górny (1936–2013), Polish footballer
- Peter Gorny (born 1941), German rower
- Yosef Gorny (born 1933), Israeli professor
