= Chistopolsky (rural locality) =

Chistopolsky (Russian: Чистопольский; masculine), Chistopolskaya (Чистопольская; feminine), or Chistopolskoye (Чистопольское; neuter) is the name of several rural localities in Russia:

- Chistopolsky, Kemerovo Oblast, a settlement in Pervomayskaya Rural Territory of Mariinsky District of Kemerovo Oblast
- Chistopolsky, Saratov Oblast, a settlement in Krasnopartizansky District of Saratov Oblast
