= White Flower Day =

Charity event in the Russian Empire and in some other countries

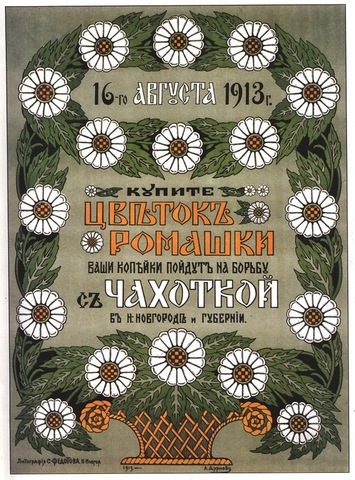
A 1913 poster for the White Flower Day.

The White Flower Day (Russian: День Белого цветка) or White Chamomile Day (Russian: День Белой ромашки) charity festival was a charity fundraising event that took place especially in the Russian Empire between 1911 and 1917 (but also in other northern European countries), usually in spring time.

== History ==
First introduced in Sweden at the beginning of the 20th century and immediately appreciated by the Tsar Nicholas II of Russia and especially by his wife, the empress Alexandra Feodorovna, it was held for the first time in the spring 1911. Mainly focused on helping people with the tuberculosis disease, it saw many people of all class in April and May of every year going around in towns and villages, selling white flowers (usually paper-reproductions of the Matricaria chamomilla or the Leucanthemum vulgare).

The inner family of Nicholas II also attended it in the years just before the outbreak of the Great War: all of them instated a great bazar in Livadiya (especially at the Livadia Palace, the local royal residence in spring time, in Crimea), selling hand-made things, while the daughters of the tsar, commonly known as OTMA, went through the streets of the towns of Livadiya and Yalta - especially near the harbor - in 1912 and 1914 to further gather money for the charity cause.

After the 1917 the charity event was not held anymore, until it was revived in the 21st century.

== Gallery ==
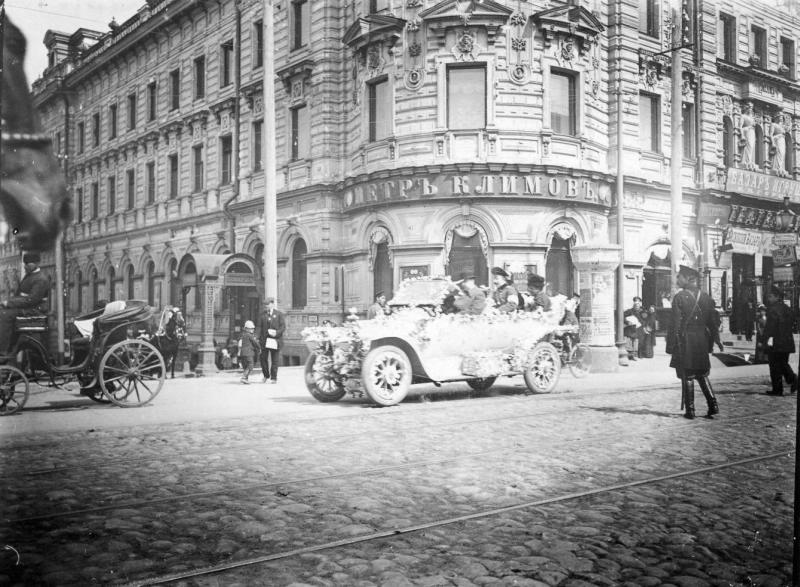
A car fully decorated with white flowers in Kazan, May 1913.

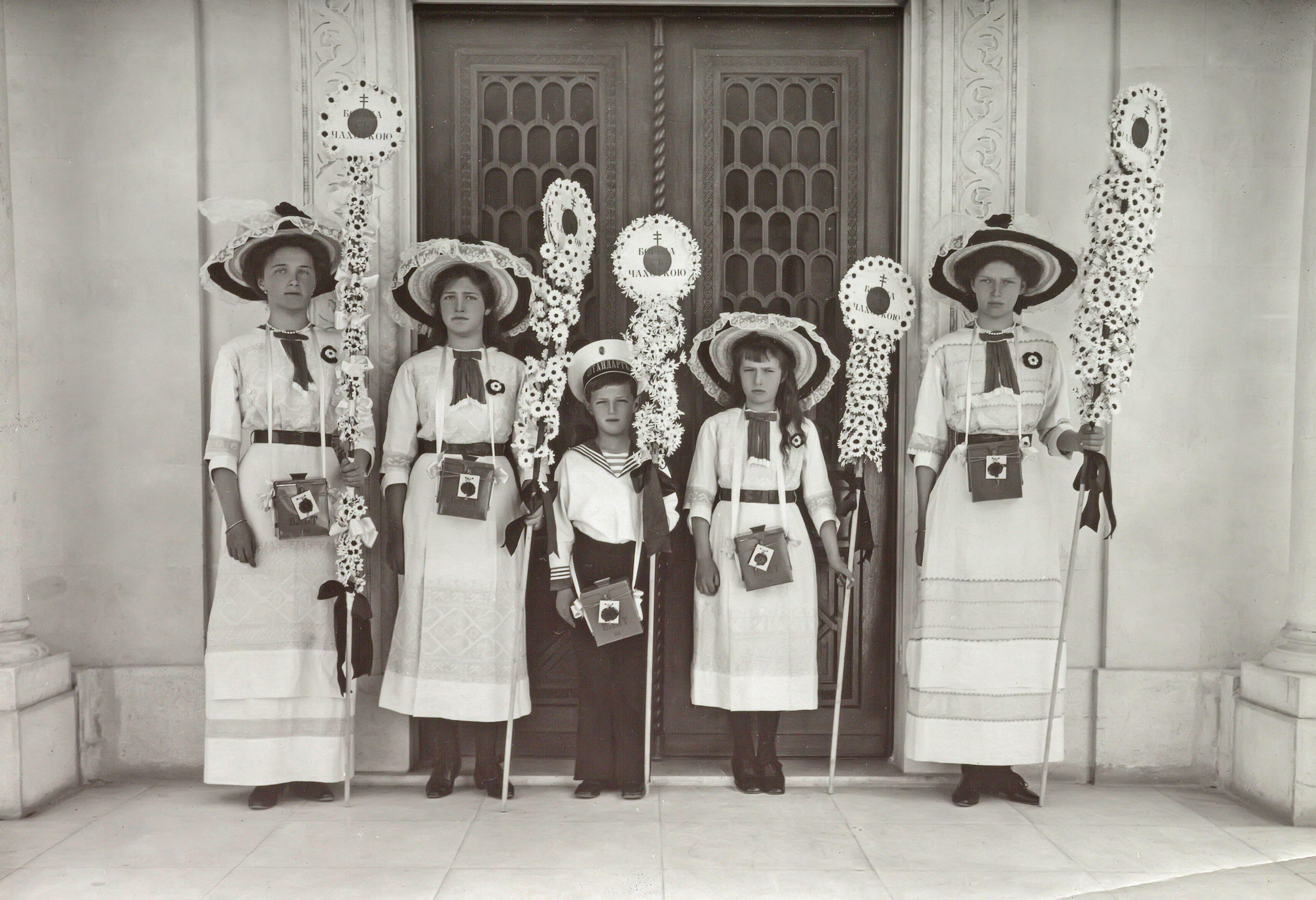
The tsar's children on White Flower Day 1912 (May 3, 1912, or April 20, 1912 in the O.S.) at the Livadiya Palace, preparing to go into the streets.

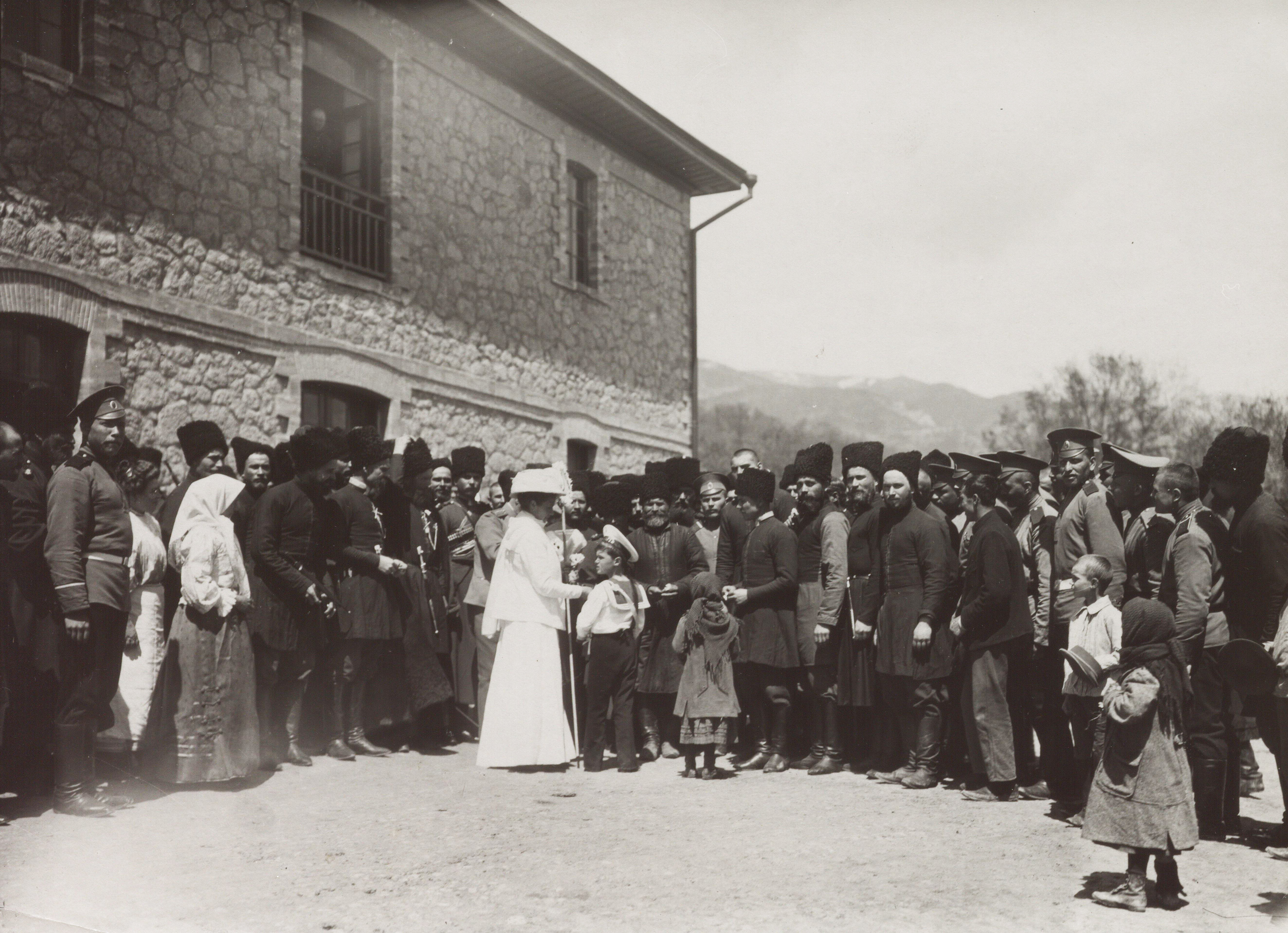
Alexei Nikolaevich selling flowers on the streets in Livadiya, May 3, 1912.

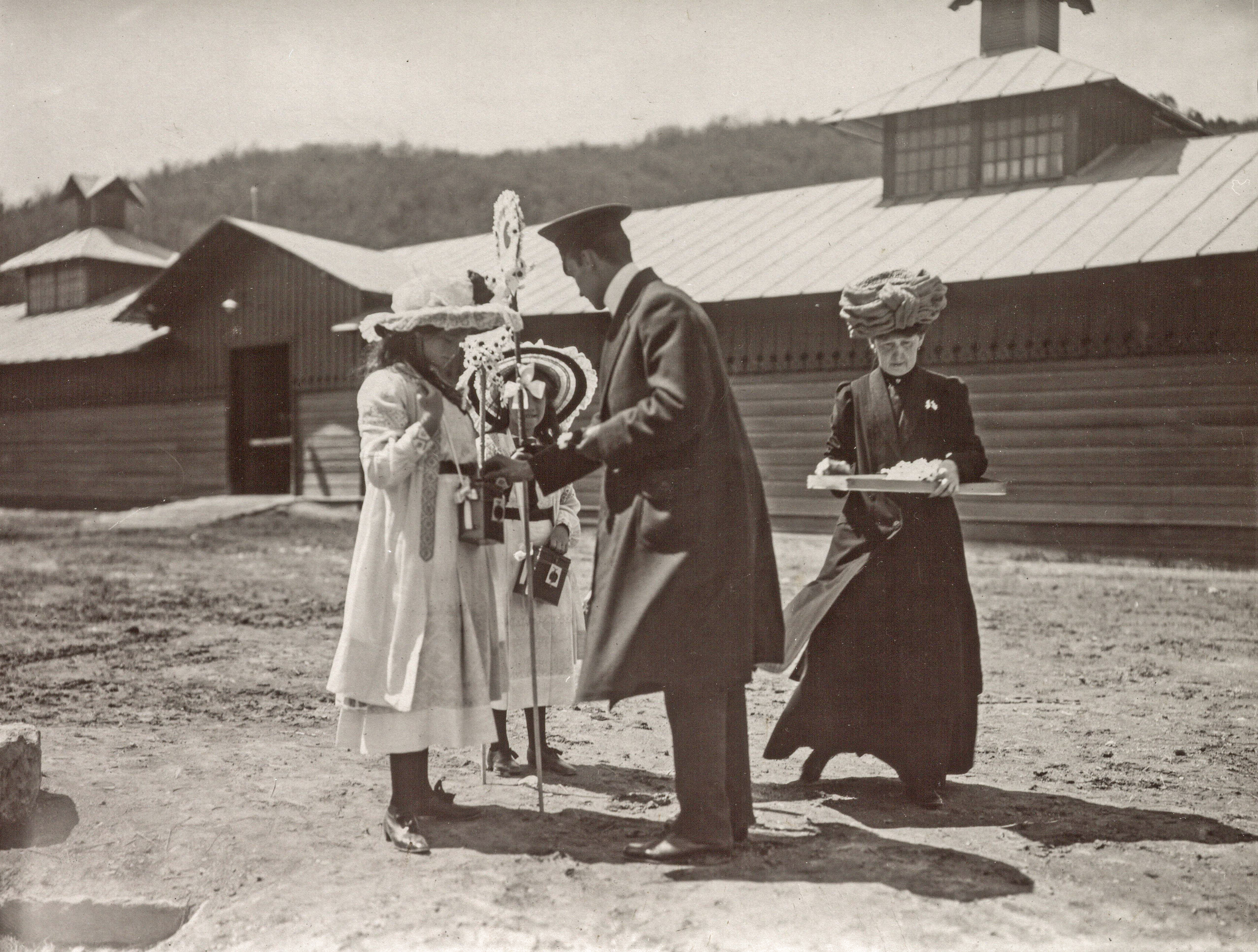
Anastasia Nikolaevna (partially hidden) and her sister Maria Nikolaevna selling flowers in Yalta, May 3, 1912.

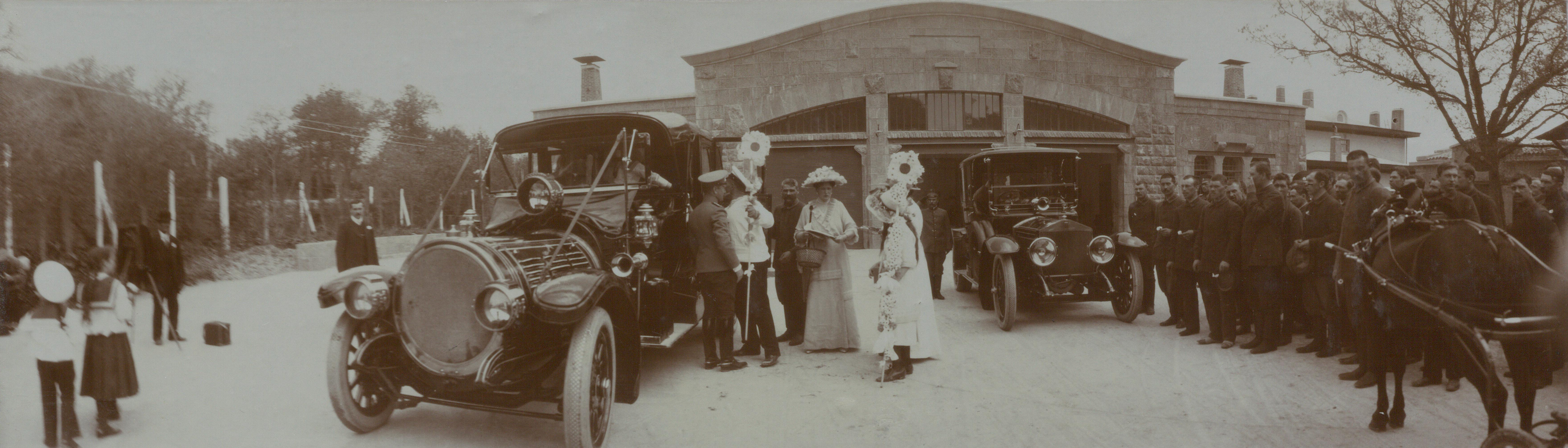
The empress Alexandra and her daughter Anastasia Nikolaevna arriving at the royal garage in Livadiya, May 2, 1914.

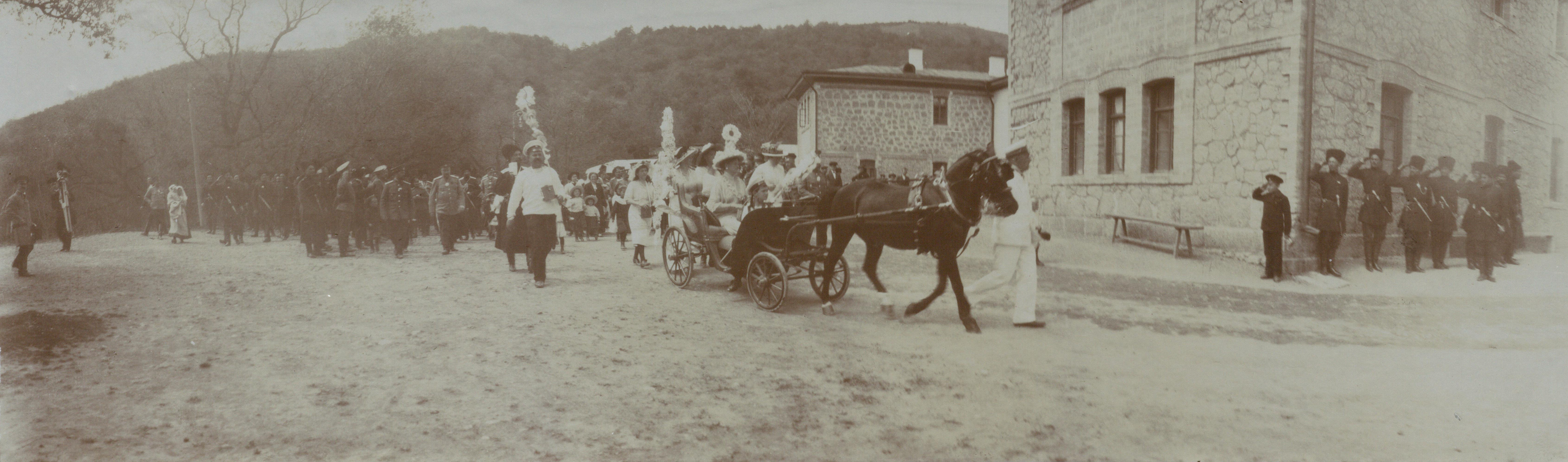
The empress Alexandra and her children departing on a carriage from the royal garage and going to Yalta in order to sell white flowers, May 3, 1914.
