= Opolzneve =

Opolzneve Оползневе
- Village
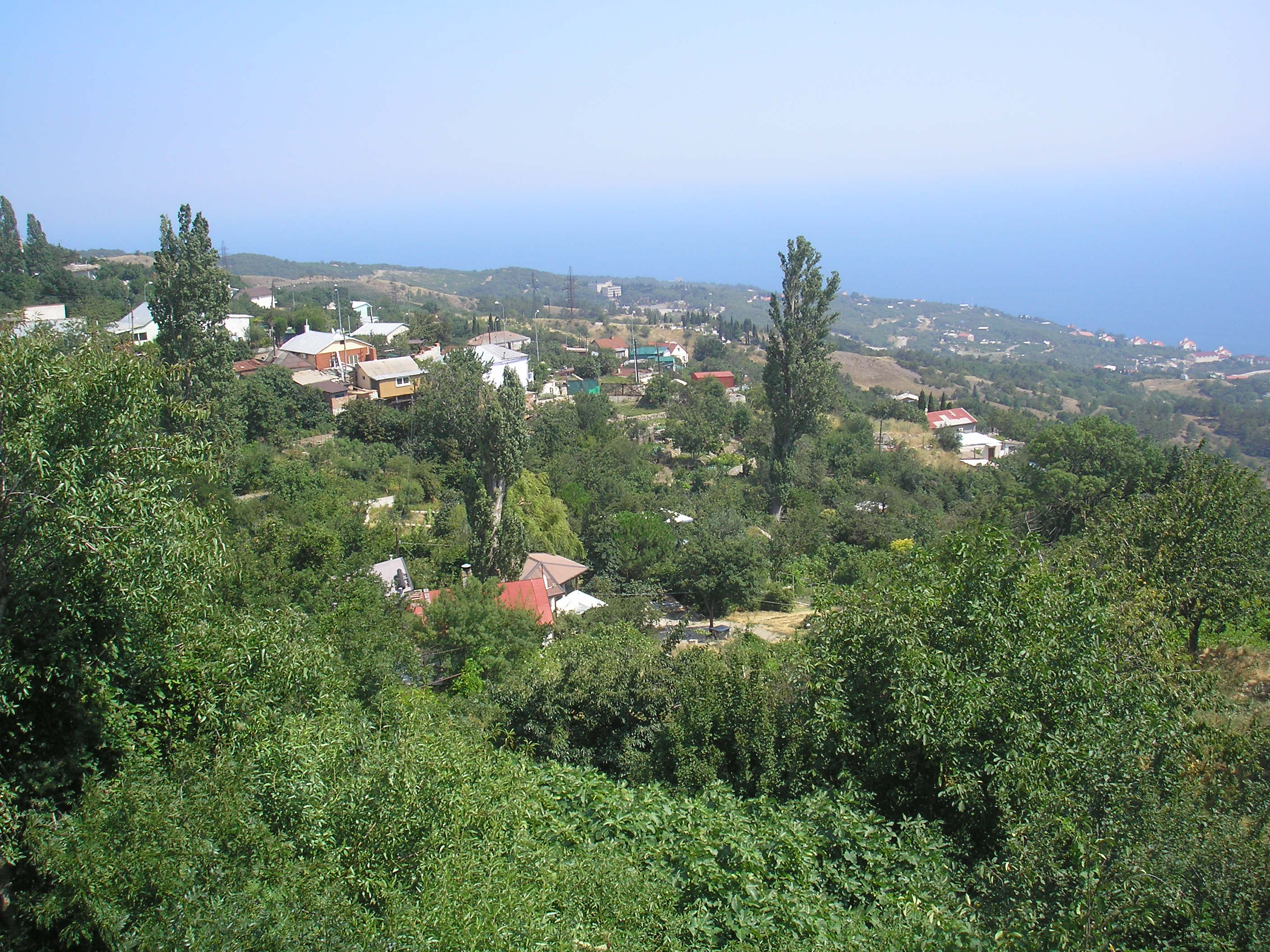

- Location of Opolzneve in Crimea Opolzneve (Crimea)
- Coordinates: 44°24′34″N 33°56′20″E
- Country: Ukraine
- Republic: Crimea
- Municipality: Yalta Municipality
- Elevation: 334 m (1,096 ft)

Population (2014)
  - Total: 390
- Time zone: UTC+4 (MSK)
- Postal code: 98685
- Area code: +380 654
- Climate: Cfb
- Website: http://rada.gov.ua/

Opolzneve (Ukrainian: Оползневе; Russian: Оползневое; Crimean Tatar: Kikineiz) is a village in the Yalta Municipality of the Autonomous Republic of Crimea, a territory recognized by a majority of countries as part of Ukraine and annexed by Russia as the Republic of Crimea. Its population was 417 in the 2001 Ukrainian census. Current population: 470 (2014 Census).

== History ==
Located near the historically significant passes of the Crimean Mountains—Miessis-Bogaz-Sokhakh, Kopek-Bogaz-Sokhakh, Pelakia, and Eski-Bogaz—as well as the nearby Shaitan-Merdven (a route to Kokkos that took approximately four hours), the village has existed since ancient times. Dolmen burials dating to the 6th–5th centuries BCE have been discovered in the cemetery near the village, along with fragments of amphorae and Greek tiles from later periods.
