= Gorny, Krasnopartizansky District, Saratov Oblast =

Gorny Горный
- Urban-type settlement
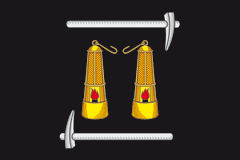
- Flag
- Interactive map of Gorny
- Location of Gorny Gorny (Saratov Oblast)
- Coordinates: 51.7572°N 48.5225°E
- Country: Russia
- Federal subject: Saratov Oblast
- Administrative district: Krasnopartizansky District
- Founded: 1931

Population (2010 Census)
  - Total: 5,084
  - Estimate (2021): 4,336 (−14.7%)
- Time zone: UTC+4 (MSK+1)
- Postal code: 413540
- OKTMO ID: 63624151051

Gorny (Russian: Горный) is an urban locality (an urban-type settlement) in Krasnopartizansky District of Saratov Oblast, Russia. Population: 5,084 (2010 census); 7,098 (2002 census); 6,578 (1989 Soviet census).
