= Hirne, Sumy Oblast =

Hirne Гірне
- Village
- Location within Sumy Oblast Location within Ukraine
- Coordinates: 50°50′20″N 34°46′05″E
- Country: Ukraine
- Oblast: Sumy
- Raion: Sumy Raion
- Elevation: 133 m (436 ft)

Population (2001)
  - Total: 94
- Time zone: UTC+2 (EET)
  - Summer (DST): UTC+3 (EEST)
- Postal code: 41133
- Area code: +380 542

Hirne (Ukrainian: Гірне) is a village in Sumy Raion, Sumy Oblast, Ukraine.

== Demographics ==
Native language as of the Ukrainian Census of 2001:

Language	Percentage
Ukrainian	95.74 %
Russian	4.26 %
