= Józef Górny =

Polish footballer (1936–2013)

Personal information
- Full name: Józef Górny
- Date of birth: 17 March 1936
- Place of birth: Toruń, Poland
- Date of death: 24 August 2013 (aged 77)
- Place of death: Gdańsk, Poland
- Height: 1.67 m (5 ft 5 1/2 in)
- Position: Forward

Youth career
- 1950–1955: Lechia Gdańsk

Senior career*
Years	Team	Apps	(Gls)
1956	Lechia Gdańsk	19	(0)
1957–1958	Zawisza Bydgoszcz		
1959–1960	Lechia Gdańsk	0	(0)
1964–1969	RKS Stocznia Północna		
- * Club domestic league appearances and goals

Józef Górny (17 March 1936 – 24 August 2013) was a Polish footballer who played as a forward. Starting his career with Lechia Gdańsk, he made his debut in the 1956 season, going on to make 19 appearances in the I liga. After his breakthrough season, he joined Zawisza Bydgoszcz as a result of his mandatory military service. He returned to Lechia Gdańsk in 1959, but failed to make another first team appearance for the club during the next two seasons, leaving Lechia after the 1960 season. It is unknown if Górny still played football for a club between 1961 and 1963 or whether he took a break from playing football altogether, but it is known he returned to playing football in 1964 and played for RKS Stocznia Północna over the next five seasons, retiring from playing football in 1969. After retiring he held coaching roles with the Lechia Gdańsk youth teams.
