= Livadiya, Crimea =

Livadiia Лівадія Ливадия
- Location of Livadiia within Crimea
- Coordinates: 44°28′15″N 34°8′38″E
- Country: Ukraine (occupied by Russia)
- Autonomous republic: Crimea (de jure)
- Raion: Yalta Raion (de jure)
- Federal subject: Crimea (de facto)
- Municipality: Yalta Municipality (de facto)
- Elevation: 30 m (98 ft)

Population (2014)
  - Total: 1,074
- Time zone: UTC+4 (MSK)
- Postal code: 98655, 98656
- Area code: +380-654
- Climate: Cfb

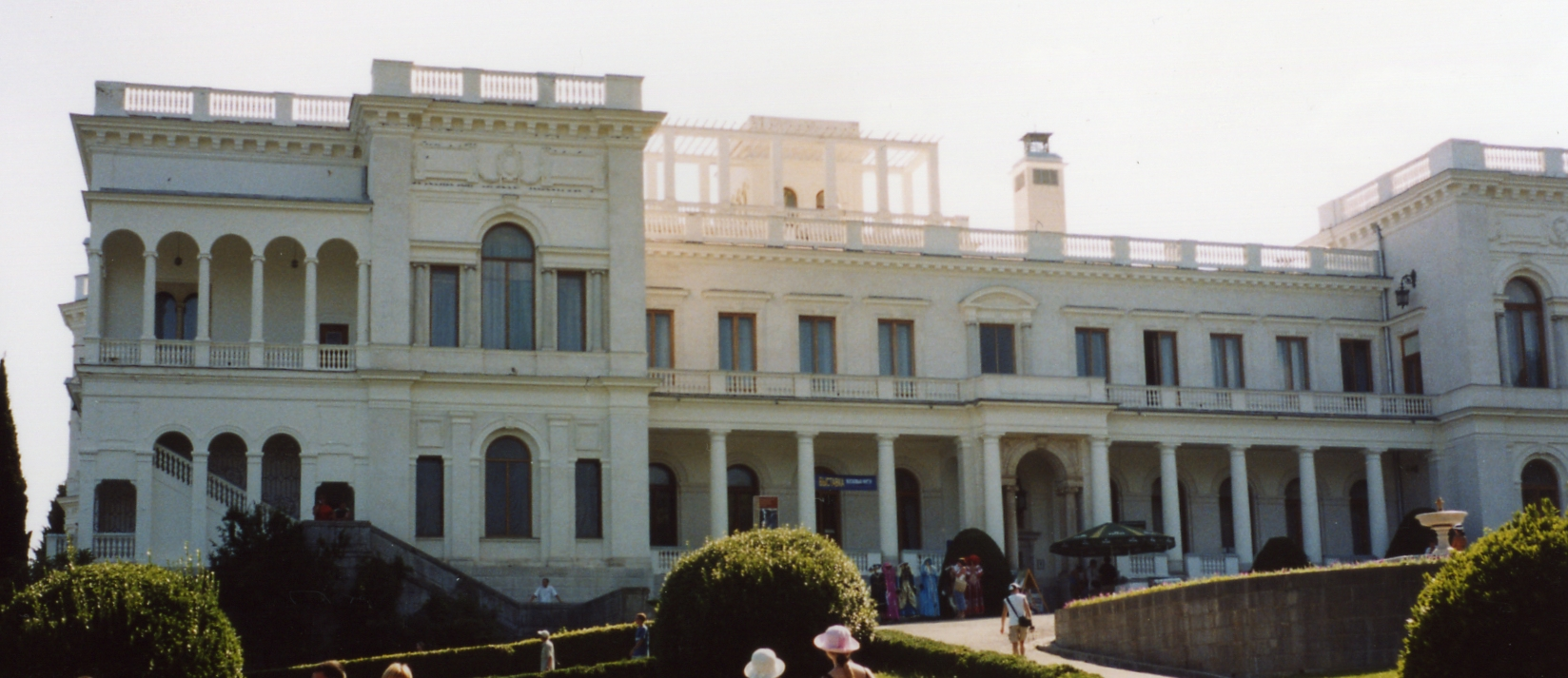
Livadia Palace used to rival the Vorontsov Palace in Alupka as the most luxurious residence in Crimea.

Livadiya (Ukrainian: Лівадія, romanized: Livadiia; Russian: Ливадия; Crimean Tatar: Livadiya, Ливадия; Greek: Λιβαδιά) is an urban-type settlement in Crimea. It is located 3 kilometres (1.9 mi) west of Yalta. Population: 1,074 (2014 Census).

== History ==
A minor Crimean Tatar settlement in the Middle Ages, Livadiya was named thus by Lambros Katsonis, a Greek revolutionary and Imperial Russian Army officer, after Livadeia, Greece, the town he was born in, then part of the Ottoman Empire. Katsonis had been granted an estate there by Empress Catherine II, which he named thus.

=== Summer residence of the Romanov (1861–1917) ===
The estate later passed to the possession of the Potocki family and then, in 1861, it became a summer residence of the Russian tsars. Emperor Alexander III of Russia died there in 1894.

The Livadia Palace, built in 1910–11, architect Nikolai Krasnov, is now a museum. It was formerly a summer palace of the last Russian Imperial family.

One of the most important events held in this town by the Romanov dynasty was the White Flower Day charity event that took place mainly in this little town from 1911 to 1917, that aimed at gathering donations to support people having tuberculosis. The event was particularly loved by the empress Alexandra Fyodorovna.

=== Later use ===
In 1945, it served as the meeting place of the Yalta Conference and residence of Franklin Delano Roosevelt during the Conference. Nowadays, Livadiia is known primarily for producing wine and is also a noted health resort.

== Namesakes ==
A minor planet 3006 Livadia discovered by Soviet astronomer Nikolai Stepanovich Chernykh in 1979 is named after the suburb.

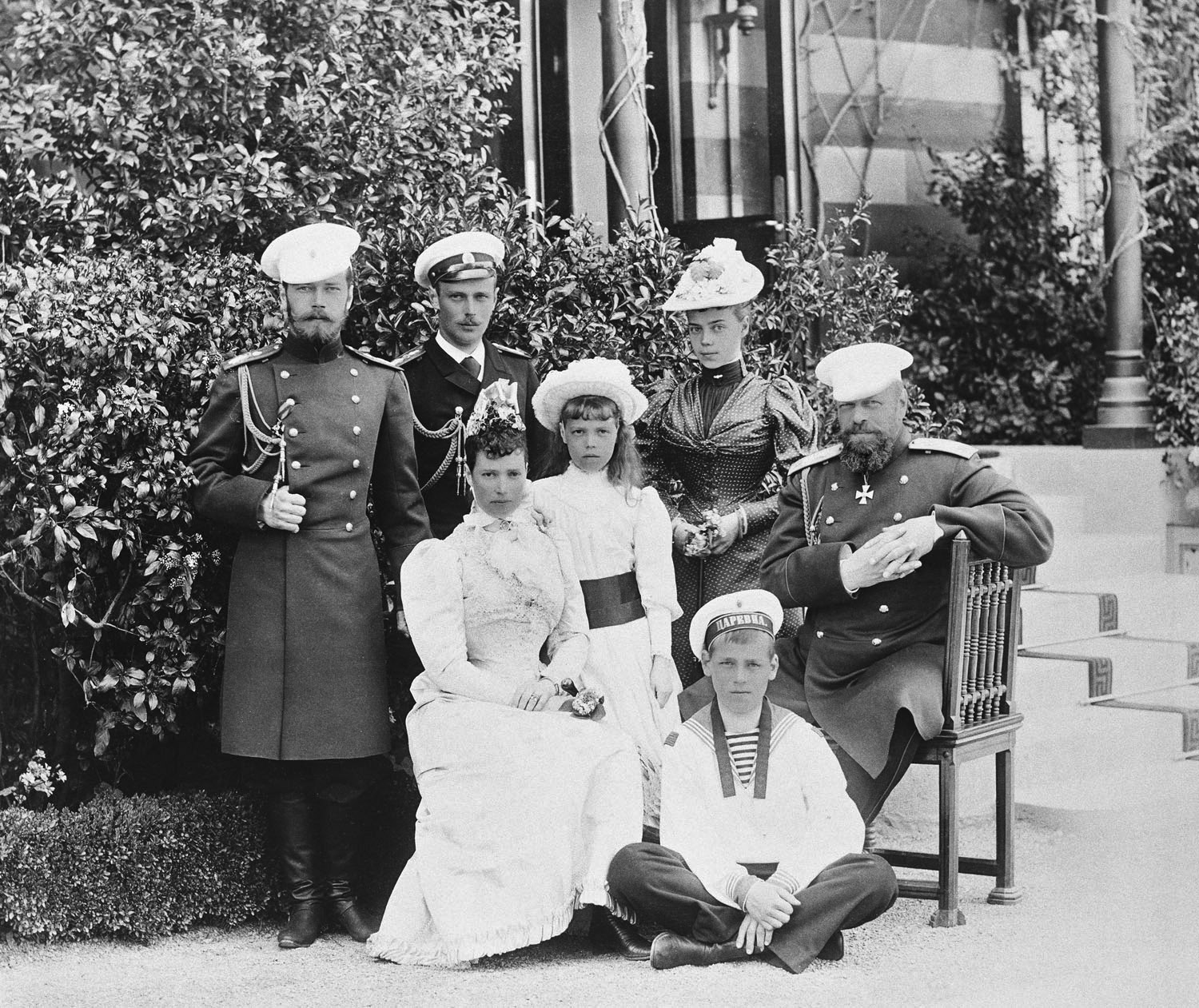
Tsar Alexander III with family in Livadia, by Fyodor Pavlovich Orlov 1893

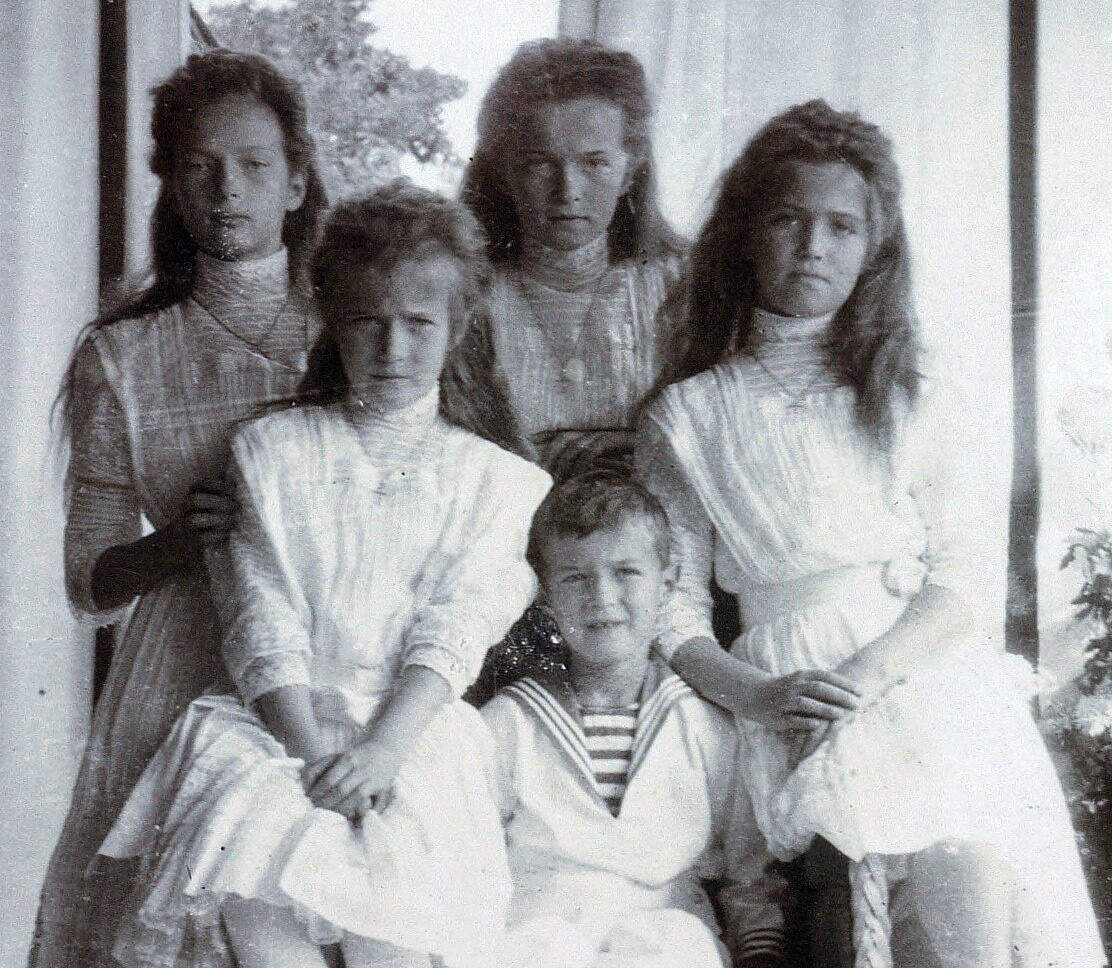
Photo of Tsar Nicholas II's children at the Livadia Palace, ca. 1909

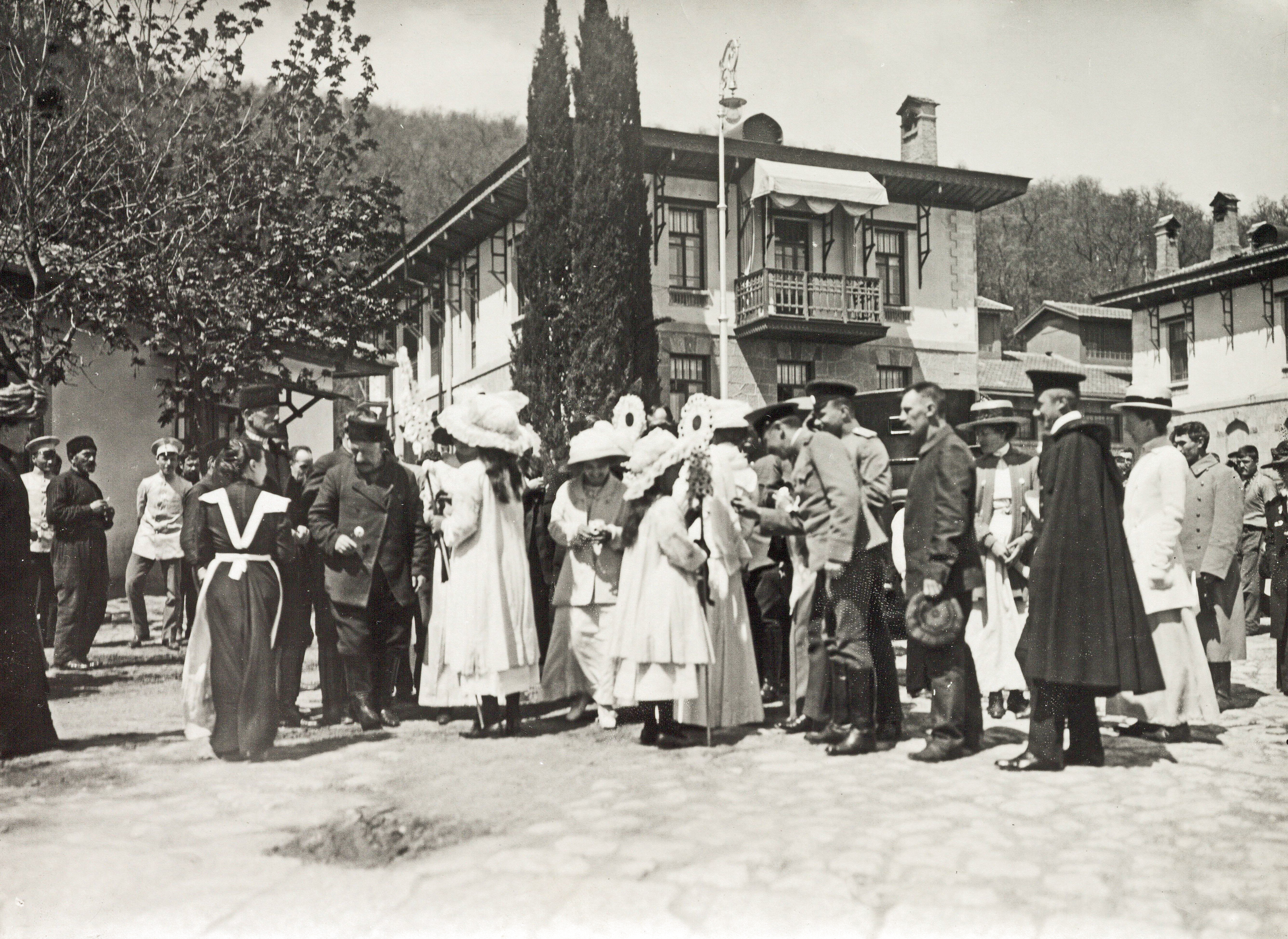
White Flower Day 1912 (May 3, 1912). The grand duchesses Anastasia and her sister Maria are selling white flowers to people.

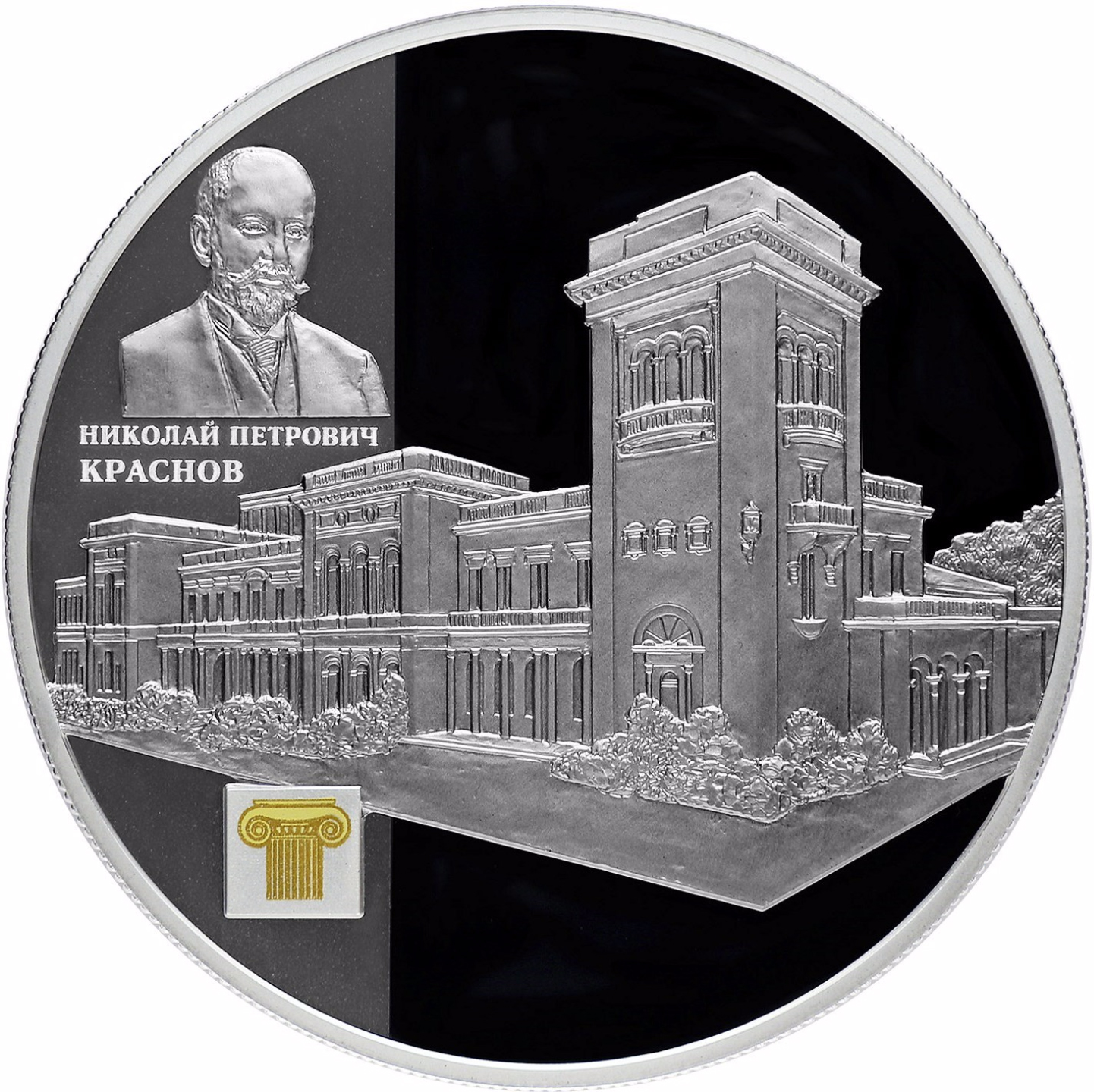
Architect Nikolai Krasnov, commemorative coin

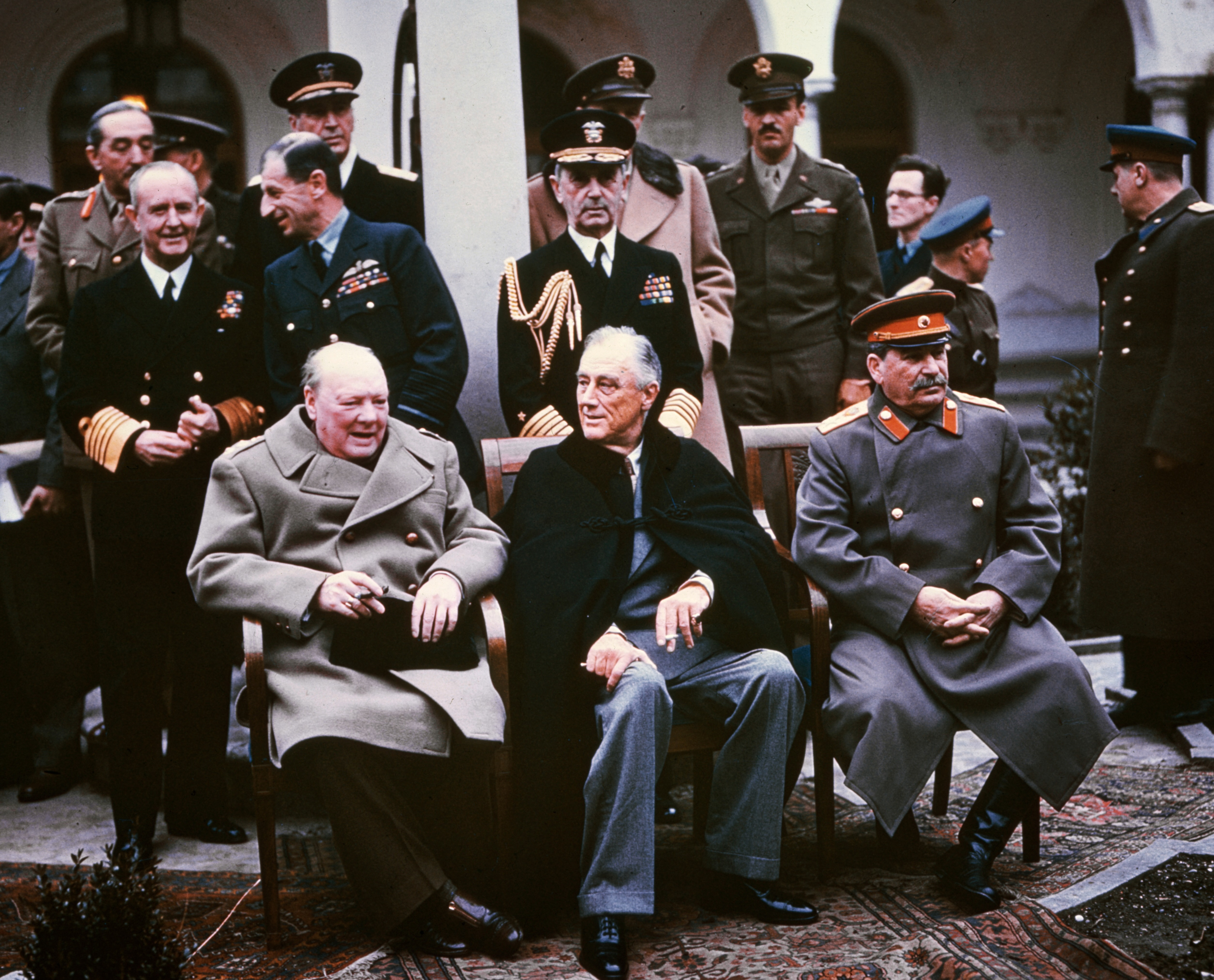
First Yalta summit, February 1945

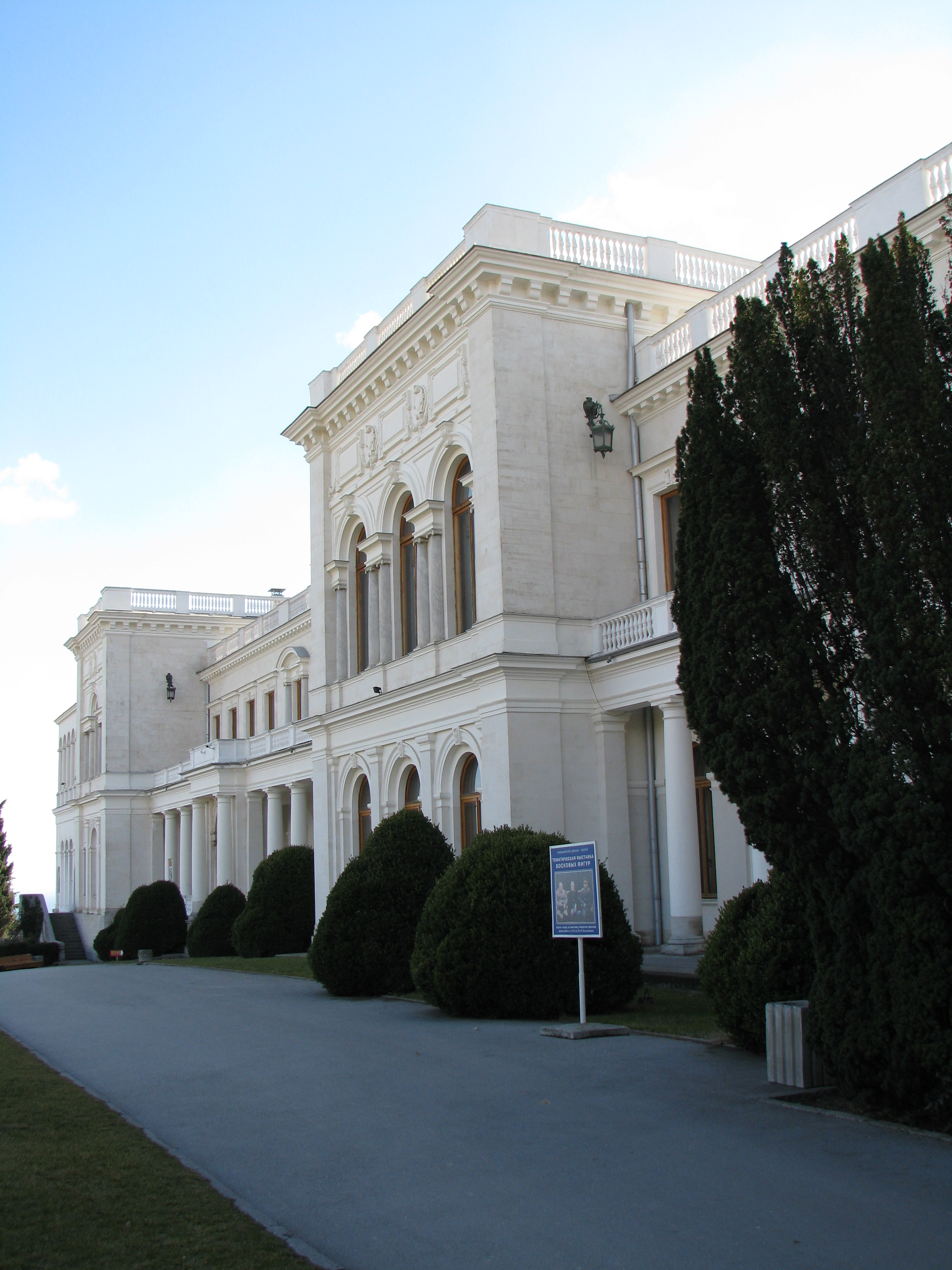
The main facade of the royal palace

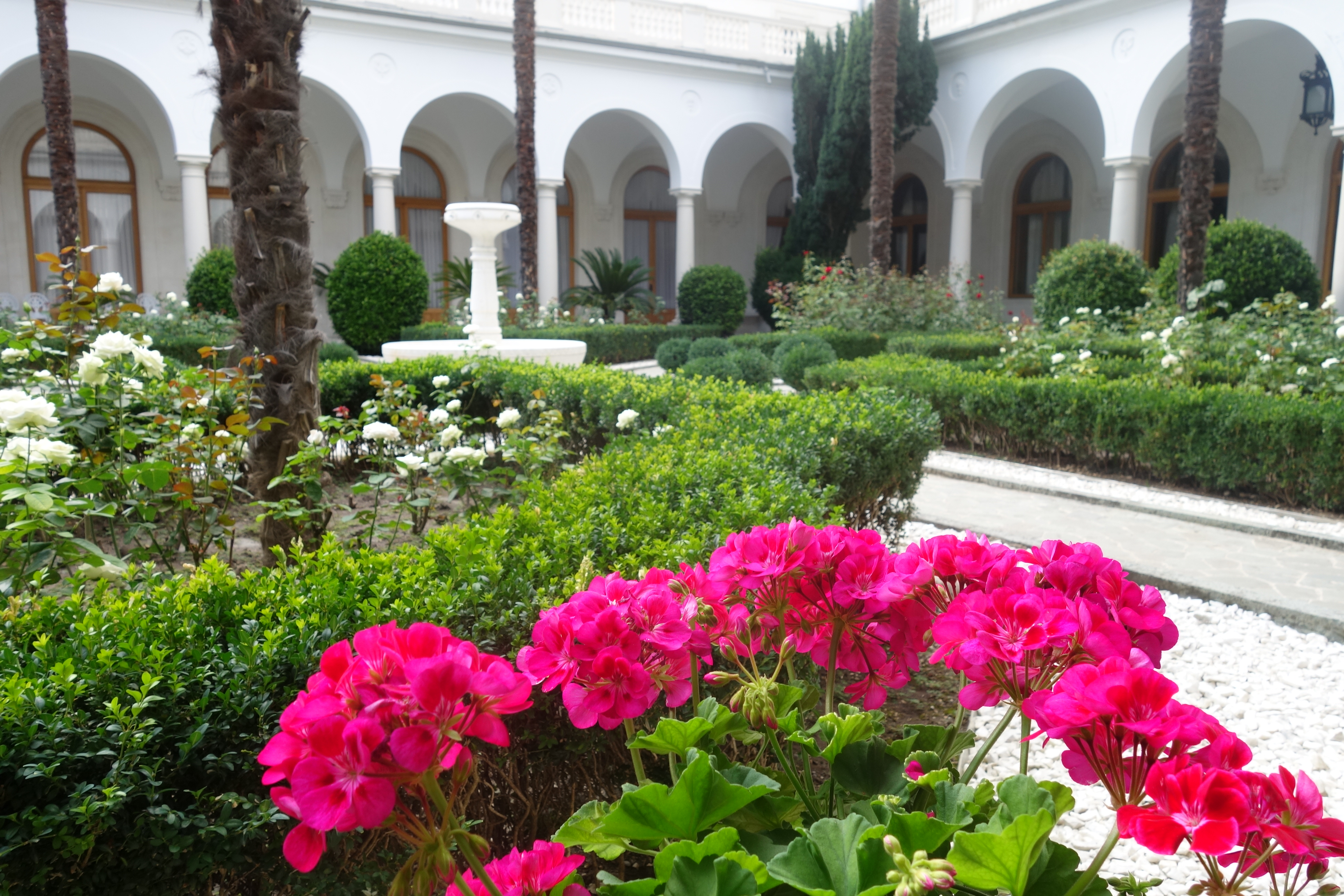
Italian courtyard

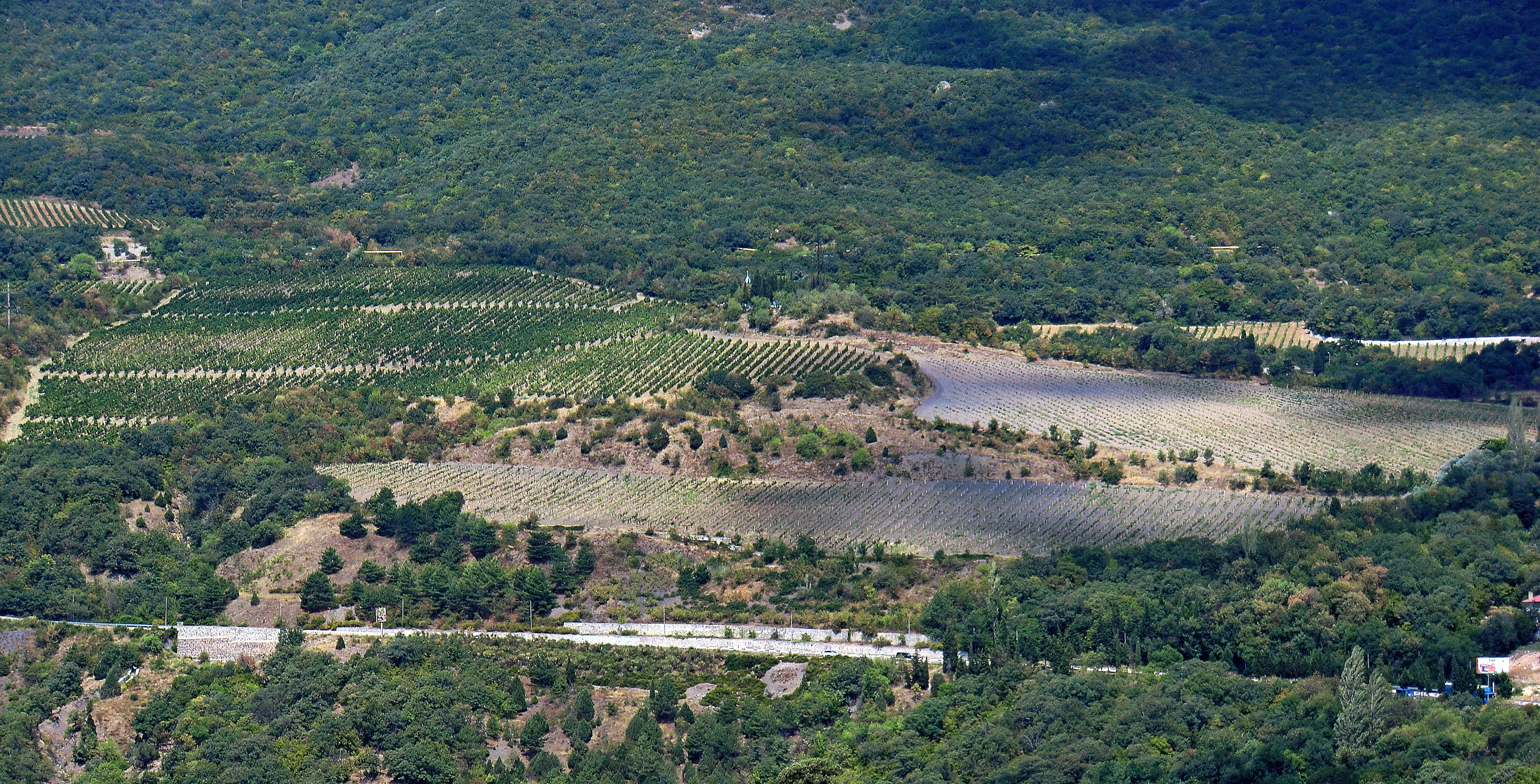
Vineyards in Livadia
