= Krasnopartizansky District =

Krasnopartizansky District Краснопартизанский район
- District
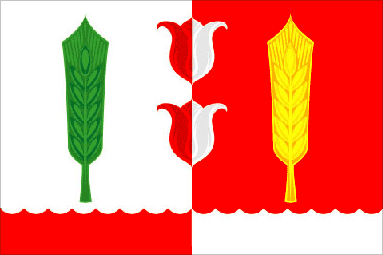
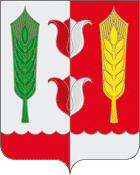
- Flag Coat of arms
- Location of Krasnopartizansky District in Saratov Oblast
- Coordinates: 51°45′N 48°51′E
- Country: Russia
- Federal subject: Saratov Oblast
- Administrative center: Gorny

Area
  - Total: 2,400 km^{2} (930 sq mi)

Population (2010 Census)
  - Total: 13,008
  - Density: 5.4/km^{2} (14/sq mi)
  - Urban: 39.1%
  - Rural: 60.9%

Administrative structure
  - Inhabited localities: 1 urban-type settlements, 29 rural localities

Municipal structure
  - Municipally incorporated as: Krasnopartizansky Municipal District
  - Municipal divisions: 1 urban settlements, 1 rural settlements
- Time zone: UTC+4 (MSK+1)
- OKTMO ID: 63624000
- Website: http://gornyi.sarmo.ru/

Krasnopartizansky District (Russian: Краснопартиза́нский райо́н) is an administrative and municipal district (raion), one of the thirty-eight in Saratov Oblast, Russia. It is located in the east of the oblast. The area of the district is 2,400 square kilometers (930 sq mi). Its administrative center is the urban locality (a work settlement) of Gorny. Population: 13,008 (2010 Census); 17,709 (2002 Census); 20,174 (1989 Soviet census). The population of Gorny accounts for 39.1% of the district's total population.
