= Yalta Municipality =

Yalta City Municipality Ялтинский городской совет Ялтинська міська рада Yalta şeer şurası, Ялта шеэр шурасы
- Municipality
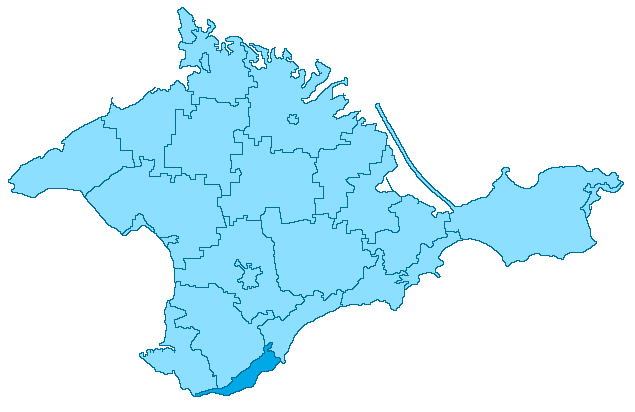
- Location within Crimea
- Coordinates: 44°29′58″N 34°10′12″E
- Country: Ukraine
- Republic: Crimea
- Capital: Yalta
- Subdivisions: List: 2 cities; 21 urban-type settlements; 1 village; 9 rural settlements

Area
  - Total: 283 km^{2} (109 sq mi)

Population (2014)
  - Total: 133,675
  - Density: 472/km^{2} (1,220/sq mi)
- Time zone: UTC+3 (MSK)
- Dialing code: +7 3654 ^{1}
- Website: yalta.rk.gov.ru
- (1) except for the town of Nikita - calling code +380-6560

Yalta City Municipality (Russian: Ялтинский городской совет; Ukrainian: Ялтинська міська рада; Crimean Tatar: Yalta şeer şurası, Ялта шеэр шурасы), officially "the territory governed by the Yalta city council", also known as Greater Yalta (Russian: Большая Ялта) is one of the 25 regions of the Autonomous Republic of Crimea, a territory recognized by a majority of countries as part of Ukraine but incorporated into Russia after Russia annexed Crimea in 2014.

It is a resort region, located at the southern shore of Crimea – one of the most famous recreational territories of the former Soviet Union. Population: 133,675 (2014 Census).

== Administrative and municipal status ==
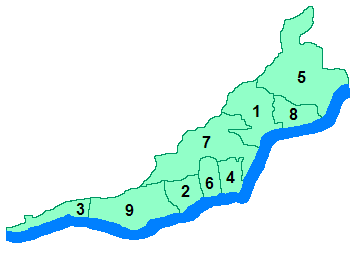
Administrative divisions of the Yalta municipality

Within the framework of administrative divisions of Russia, Yalta is, together with a number of urban and rural localities, incorporated separately as the town of republican significance of Yalta—an administrative unit with the status equal to that of the districts. As a municipal division, the town of republican significance of Yalta is incorporated as Yalta Urban Okrug.

Within the framework of administrative divisions of Ukraine, Yalta is incorporated as the town of republican significance of Yalta. Its governing body, Yalta miskrada (Yalta city council) was governing the territory what is described here as Yalta Urban Okrug.

Besides the cities of Yalta and Alupka, the region includes 21 towns and 9 villages which are organised into 7 town communities.

Former Crimean Tatar names which were officially changed in 1945-49 after the deportation of Crimean Tatars and are now used only by the Crimean Tatar community are mentioned in brackets.

- 1 - the city of Yalta
- 2 - Alupka town community
  - Alupka
- 3 - Foros town community
  - Foros
  - Melas or Sanatorne
  - Muhalatka
  - Mshatka
  - Oliva
- 4 - Gaspra town community
  - Gaspra
- 5 - Gurzuf town community
  - Gurzuf
  - Ay Danil or Danylivka (Ay Danil)
  - Krasnokamianka (Qızıltaş)
  - Lineyne
  - Partyzanske
- 6 - Koreiz town community
  - Koreiz
  - Mishor (officially part of Koreiz)
- 7 - Livadiya town community
  - Livadiya
  - Vynohradne
  - Vysokohirne (Tüzler)
  - Hirne (Eriklik)
  - Kuibysheve (İsar)
  - Kurpaty
  - Oreanda
  - Ohotniche
- 8 - Massandra town community
  - Massandra
  - Nikita
  - Vidradne (Mağaraç)
  - Voskhod (Cemiyet)
  - Sovietske (Dolossı)
- 9 - Simeiz town community
  - Simeiz
  - Kastropol or Berehove
  - Holuba Zatoka (Limena)
  - Katsiveli
  - Opolzneve (Kikineiz)
  - Parkove (Yañı Küçükköy)
  - Ponyzivka

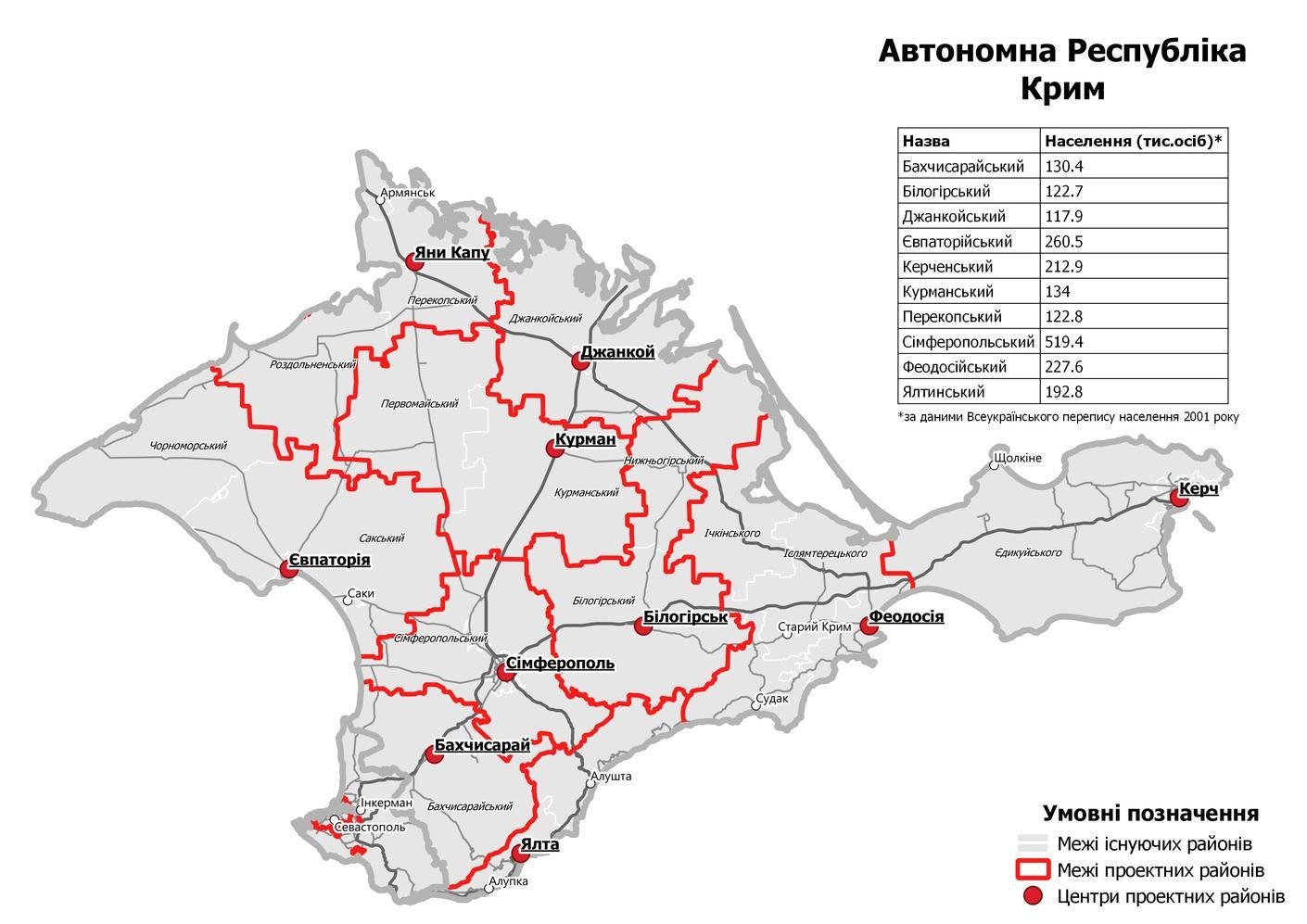
In July 2020, the Verkhovna Rada approved an administrative reform in Crimea

=== Demographics ===
Ethnic composition according to the 2001 Ukrainian census:

2001 Ukrainian census
	percent
Russians	65.5%
Ukrainians	27.6%
Belarusians	1.6%
Crimean Tatars	1.3%
Armenians	0.6%
Tatars	0.3%
Azerbaijanis	0.3%
Jews	0.3%
Poles	0.2%
Moldovans	0.2%
Georgians	0.2%
Greeks	0.1%
Germans	0.1%
Ossetians	0.1%

== 2020 Ukrainian Administrative Reform ==
In July 2020, Ukraine conducted an administrative reform throughout its de jure territory. This included Crimea, which was at the time occupied by Russia, and is still ongoing as of October 2023. Crimea was reorganized from 14 raions and 11 municipalities into 10 raions, with municipalities abolished altogether.

Yalta Municipality was abolished, and its territories to become a part of Yalta Raion, but this has not yet been implemented due to the ongoing Russian occupation.

== Places of interest ==
- Nikitsky Botanical Garden (Nikita)
- International children's centre of Artek (Gurzuf)
- Livadia Palace (Livadiya)
- Vorontsov Palace (Alupka)

== See also ==
- Yalta Raion
