= Yalta Raion =

Yalta Raion Ялтинський район
- Raion
- Interactive map of Yalta Raion
- Country: Ukraine
- Autonomous Republic: Autonomous Republic of Crimea
- Established: 1938 (first); 2023 (current)
- Admin. center: Yalta

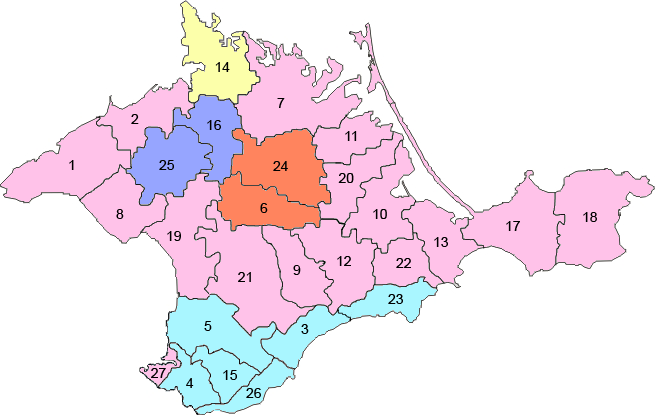
Map of the administrative divisions of the Crimean ASSR in 1938. The Yalta Raion is indicated by the number 26.

The Yalta Raion, also transliterated as Yaltynskyi Raion (Ukrainian: Ялтинський район; Russian: Ялтинский район) is a prospective raion (district) of the Autonomous Republic of Crimea, Ukraine. It was first created in 1920s inside the Crimean Autonomous Soviet Socialist Republic as part of the Russian Soviet Federative Socialist Republic and it was reorganized into the Yalta Municipality in 1948.

It was recreated again on September 7, 2023 from the territories of the Alushta and Yalta municipalities.

The administrative center is the city of Yalta.

== See also ==
- Administrative divisions of Crimea
- Southern Coast (Crimea)
