= List of cities in Crimea =

Location of cities on the Crimean peninsula, using de facto pre-2023 (Note: The initial administrative reform laws passed in 2020 were not de jure enacted for Crimea at the time due to a provision within the laws delaying the imposition of the new subdivisions until the Ukrainian government regained control of the peninsula in some indeterminate future date. On 7 September 2023, an amendment to the original law entered into force which removed the previous provision and enacted the new subdivisions from that date, thereby making them fully legally in effect since 2023.) administrative boundaries, with red dots indicating Russian-occupied cities and the blue dot marking Balaklava, the city status of which is generally not recognized. (Note: Due to the continued international recognition of Crimea as sovereign territory of Ukraine and the non-recognition of Russia's jurisdiction over it, the United Nations General Assembly and most of the international community do not recognize administrative changes made by Russian-appointed officials in Crimea, including the granting of city status to Balaklava.) The pre-2023 administrative area of Sevastopol, on the southwestern end of the peninsula, is shaded in light gray.

There are 18 populated places in the Crimean peninsula that are recognized as having city status. The territory of Crimea has been disputed between Russia and Ukraine since Russia's covert invasion and internationally unrecognized annexation of the peninsula on 18 March 2014. The region is recognized by most countries as Ukraine's Autonomous Republic of Crimea and Sevastopol as one of Ukraine's cities with special status while, since its annexation, the region has been de facto governed by Russia as the Republic of Crimea and Sevastopol as a city of federal importance. As of 2014, the largest city on the peninsula by population according to Russia's post-annexation census was Sevastopol, with a recorded population of 393,304 people, while the peninsula's second largest city was Simferopol, with 332,317 people. The least populous city on the peninsula was Alupka, which was recorded with a population of 7,771 people in the 2014 census.

In Ukraine, city status (Ukrainian: місто, romanized: misto) is granted by the country's parliament, the Verkhovna Rada, to settlements of 10,000 people or more or to settlements of historical or regional importance. Following its occupation and annexation of Crimea, Russia recognized and maintained the existing status of the peninsula's 18 cities. In 2019, Russian officials granted the settlement Balaklava, located in Sevastopol's Balaklava urban district, the status of a city, although still keeping it as part of Sevastopol. Due to the international support for UN General Assembly Resolution 68/262, which recognizes Ukrainian sovereignty over Crimea and endorses a policy of non-recognition of Russia's occupation of the peninsula, the new city status is largely not recognized.

Following the passing of decommunization laws, the city of Krasnoperekopsk was renamed in 2023 to Yany Kapu (a new Crimean Tatar name) for Krasnoperekopsk's connection to people, places, events, and organizations associated with the Soviet Union. Two cities on the peninsula (Kerch and Sevastopol) were awarded by Soviet officials with the honorary title Hero City of Ukraine in 1973 and 1965, respectively, for their resistance to the Axis invasion of the Soviet Union during World War II; the titles were renewed in 2022 by Ukrainian President Volodymyr Zelenskyy.

== Administrative divisions ==
From independence in 1991 to 2020, 11 cities in the autonomous republic were designated as cities of regional significance (municipalities), which had self-government under city councils, while the autonomous republic's remaining five cities were located in 14 raions (districts) as cities of district significance, which are subordinated to the governments of the raions. Sevastopol, as one of two (Note: The other city with special status is Kyiv, the national capital.) cities given special status by the constitution, was governed together with the city of Inkerman and other nearby settlements by the Sevastopol City Council, independently from the autonomous republic. Since the country's independence in 1991, the territory of the Sevastopol City Council has been divided between four urban districts: Gagarin, Lenin, Nakhimov, and Balaklava.

On 17 July 2020, the Ukrainian Verkhovna Rada passed a major administrative reform, abolishing the autonomous republic's 11 city municipalities and 14 raions and merging them into 10 reformed raions. The ten raions that make up the territory of the autonomous republic are Bakhchysarai, Bilohirsk, Dzhankoi, Yevpatoria, (Note: New raion created on 7 September 2023 from the merger of Saky and Chornomorske raions and Yevpatoria and Saky municipalities. Due to the Russian occupation of Crimea since 2014, the raion has only de jure status.) Kerch, (Note: New raion created on 7 September 2023 from the merger of Lenine Raion (renamed by Ukraine to Yedy-Kuiu Raion simultaneously with the merger) and Kerch municipality. Due to the Russian occupation of Crimea since 2014, the raion as well as the Ukrainian name have only de jure status.) Kurman, (Note: Previously known as Krasnohvardiiske Raion in Ukraine prior to its enlargement on 7 September 2023 to include additional territories according to an earlier administrative reform in 2020. Due to the Russian occupation of Crimea at the time of the renaming and reform, the new name and boundaries have only de jure status.) Perekop, (Note: Previously known as Krasnoperekopsk Raion in Ukraine prior to its enlargement on 7 September 2023 to include additional territories according to an earlier administrative reform in 2020. Due to the Russian occupation of Crimea at the time of the renaming and reform, the new name and boundaries have only de jure status.) Simferopol, Feodosia, (Note: New raion created on 7 September 2023 from the merger of Kirovske Raion (renamed by Ukraine to Isliam-Terek Raion simultaneously with the merger) and Sovietskyi Raion (renamed by Ukraine to Ichki Raion simultaneously with the merger). Due to the Russian occupation of Crimea since 2014, the raion as well as the Ukrainian names have only de jure status.) and Yalta raions. (Note: New raion created on 7 September 2023 from the merger of Alushta and Yalta municipalities. Due to the Russian occupation of Crimea since 2014, the raion has only de jure status.) For Sevastopol, the Verkhovna Rada merged Inkerman and other surrounding areas outside Sevastopol's city boundary (except Balaklava, which remained administratively part of Sevastopol) into the enlarged Bakhchysarai Raion. Due to the region's continued occupation since 2014, the new raions and boundaries have remained solely de jure and Russian officials continue to use the pre-reform administrative divisions in Crimea.

== List of cities ==
Cities in Crimea
Name	Name (in Crimean Tatar) (Note: Links to the Crimean Tatar Wikipedia articles for each city)	Name (in Russian) (Note: Links to the Russian Wikipedia articles for each city)	Name (in Ukrainian) (Note: Links to the Ukrainian Wikipedia articles for each city)	Ukrainian subdivision (de jure)	Russian subdivision (de facto)	Population (2014 census)	Population (2001 census)	Population change
Alupka	Alupka	Алупка	Алупка	Yalta Raion	Yalta Municipality	7,771	9,018	−13.83%
Alushta	Aluşta	Алушта	Алушта	Yalta Raion	Alushta Municipality	29,078	31,440	−7.51%
Armiansk	Ermeni Bazar	Армянск	Армянськ	Perekop Raion	Armiansk Municipality	21,987	23,869	−7.88%
Bakhchysarai	Bağçasaray	Бахчисарай	Бахчисарай	Bakhchysarai Raion	Bakhchysarai Raion	27,448	27,549	−0.37%
Bilohirsk	Qarasuvbazar	Белогорск	Білогірськ	Bilohirsk Raion	Bilohirsk Raion	16,354	18,790	−12.96%
Dzhankoi	Canköy	Джанкой	Джанкой	Dzhankoi Raion	Dzhankoi Municipality	38,622	43,343	−10.89%
Feodosia	Kefe	Феодосия	Феодосія	Feodosia Raion	Feodosia Municipality	69,038	74,669	−7.54%
Inkerman	İnkerman	Инкерман	Інкерман	Bakhchysarai Raion	N/A (administratively part of the federal city Sevastopol)	10,348	10,628	−2.63%
Kerch	Keriç	Керчь	Керч	Kerch Raion	Kerch Municipality	147,033	157,007	−6.35%
Krasnoperekopsk	Yañı Qapu	Красноперекопск	Яни Капу (Note: Transliteration of the Crimean Tatar name Yañı Qapu. Krasnoperekopsk in Ukrainian is Красноперекопськ.)	Perekop Raion	Krasnoperekopsk Municipality	26,268	31,023	−15.33%
Saky	Saq	Саки	Саки	Yevpatoria Raion	Saky Municipality	25,146	29,416	−14.52%
Sevastopol	Aqyar	Севастополь	Севастополь	N/A (city with special status)	N/A (federal city)	393,304 (Note: Includes population figures for Balaklava and excludes population of Inkerman city.)	342,451	+14.85%
Shcholkine	Şçolkino	Щёлкино (Note: Spelled as Щелкино (with the letter ё written without the double dot) in Russia's 2014 Crimean Federal District census.)	Щолкіне	Kerch Raion	Lenine Raion	10,620	11,699	−9.22%
Simferopol	Aqmescit	Симферополь	Сімферополь	Simferopol Raion	Simferopol Municipality	332,317	343,644	−3.30%
Staryi Krym	Eski Qırım	Старый Крым	Старий Крим	Feodosia Raion	Kirovske Raion	9,277	10,101	−8.16%
Sudak	Sudaq	Судак	Судак	Feodosia Raion	Sudak Municipality	16,492	14,495	+13.78%
Yalta	Yalta	Ялта	Ялта	Yalta Raion	Yalta Municipality	76,746	81,654	−6.01%
Yevpatoria	Kezlev	Евпатория	Євпаторія	Yevpatoria Raion	Yevpatoria Municipality	105,719	105,915	−0.19%

== Gallery ==
Largest cities in Crimea by population

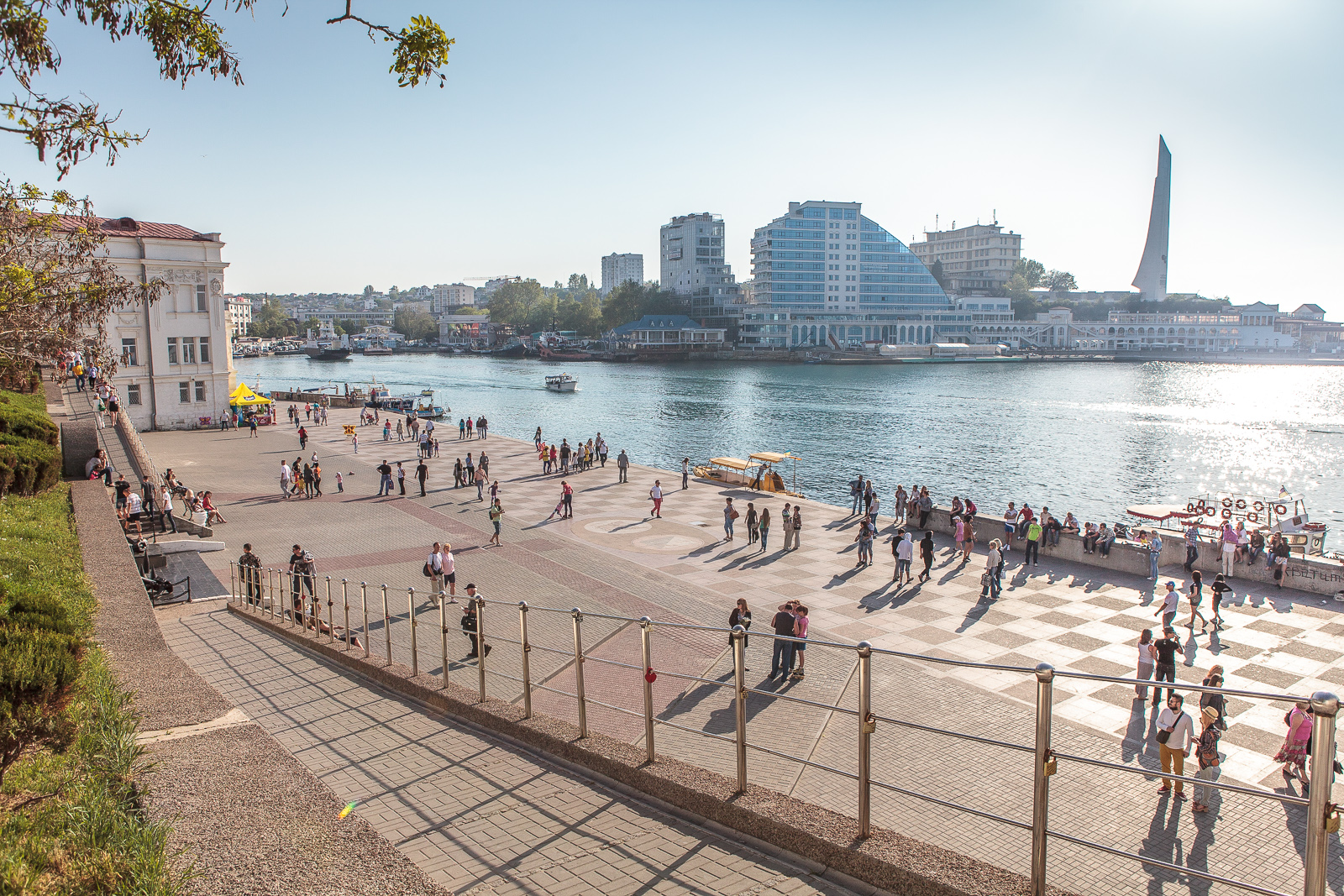
Sevastopol, Crimea's largest city by population (Note: As of 2014, according to Russia's post-annexation census.) and site of a major naval base

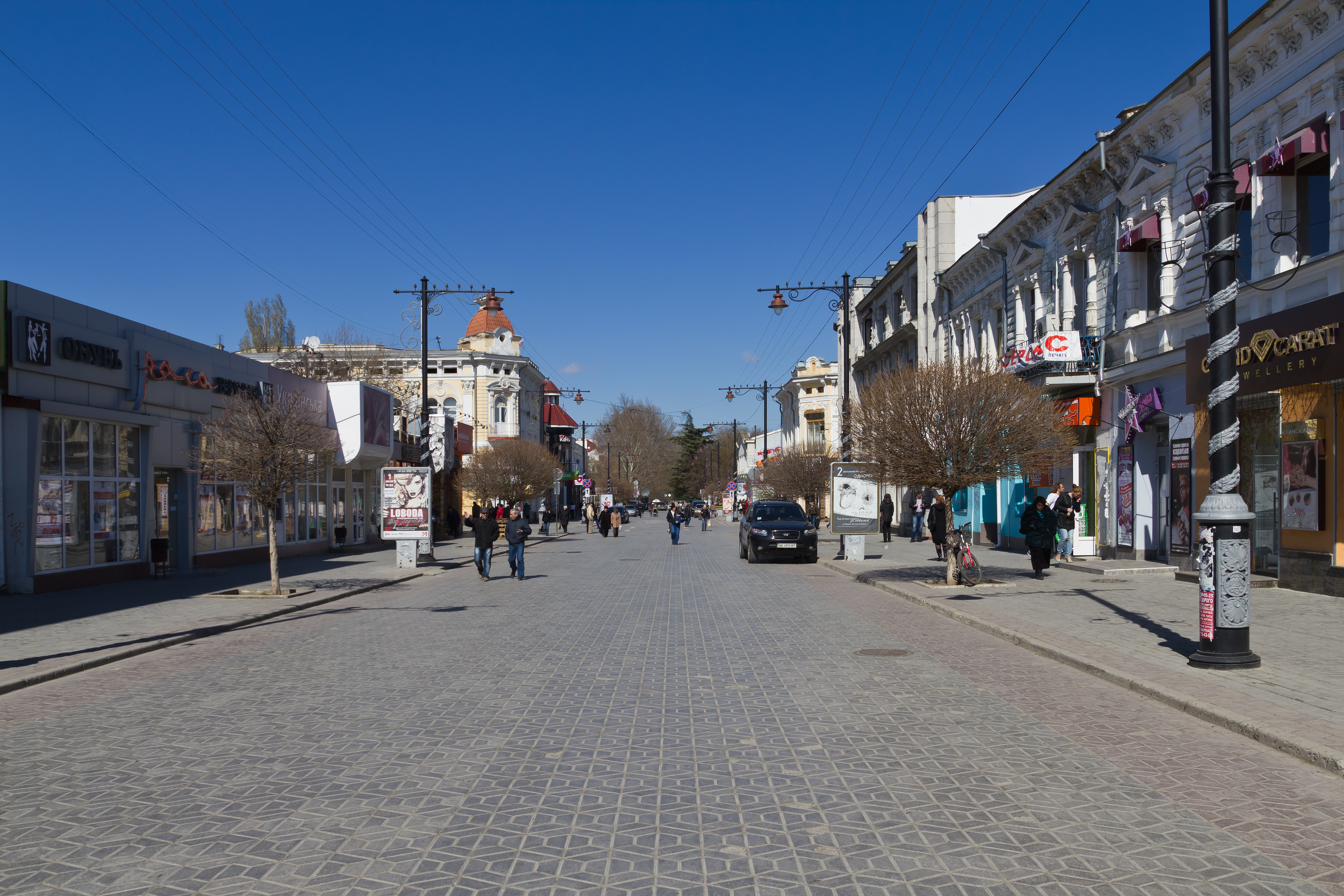
Simferopol, administrative center and second most populous city in Crimea

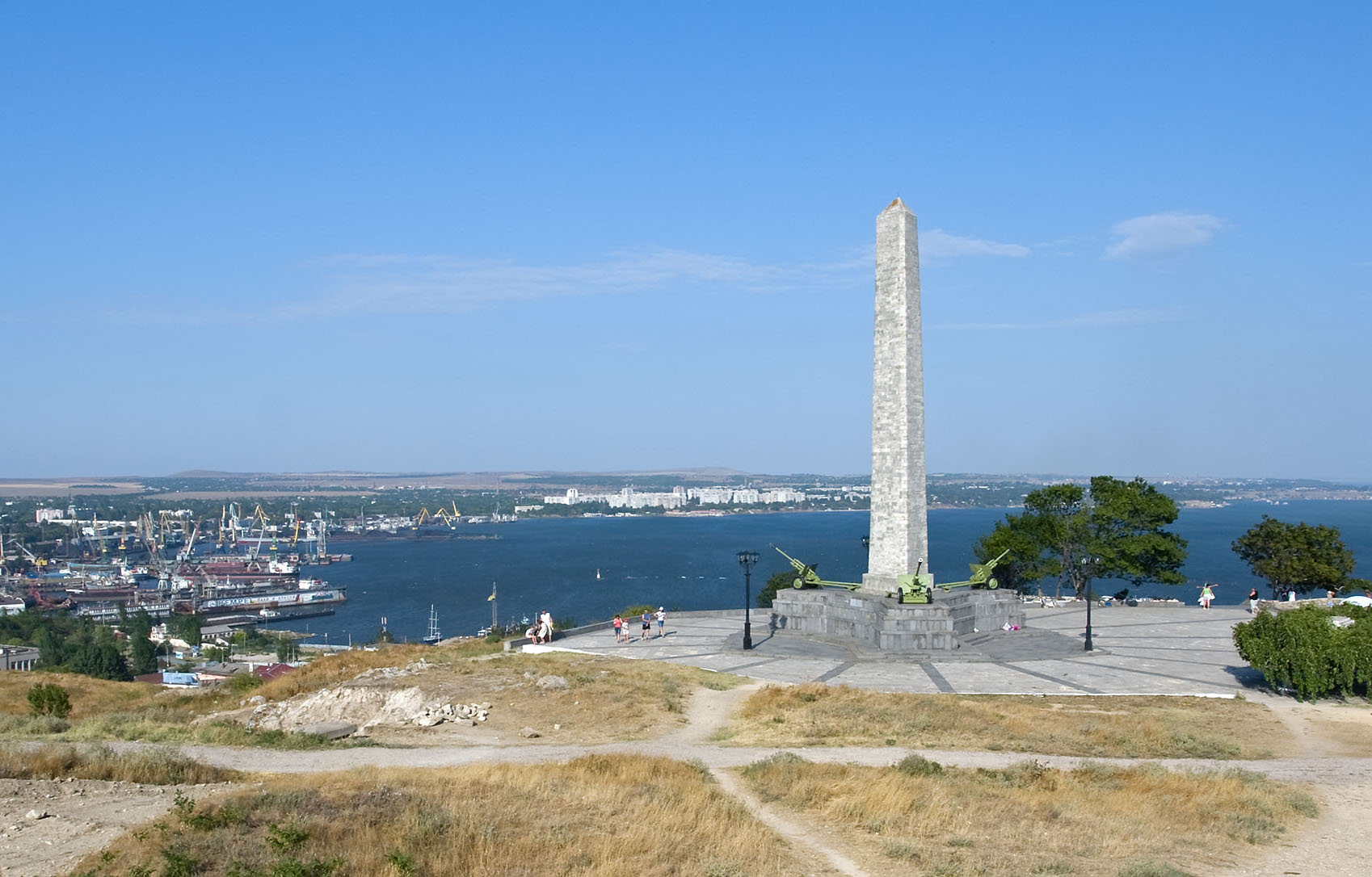
Kerch, important port city on the Kerch Strait and Crimea's third largest city by population

Yevpatoria, major city on Crimea's west coast and fourth most populous city on the peninsula

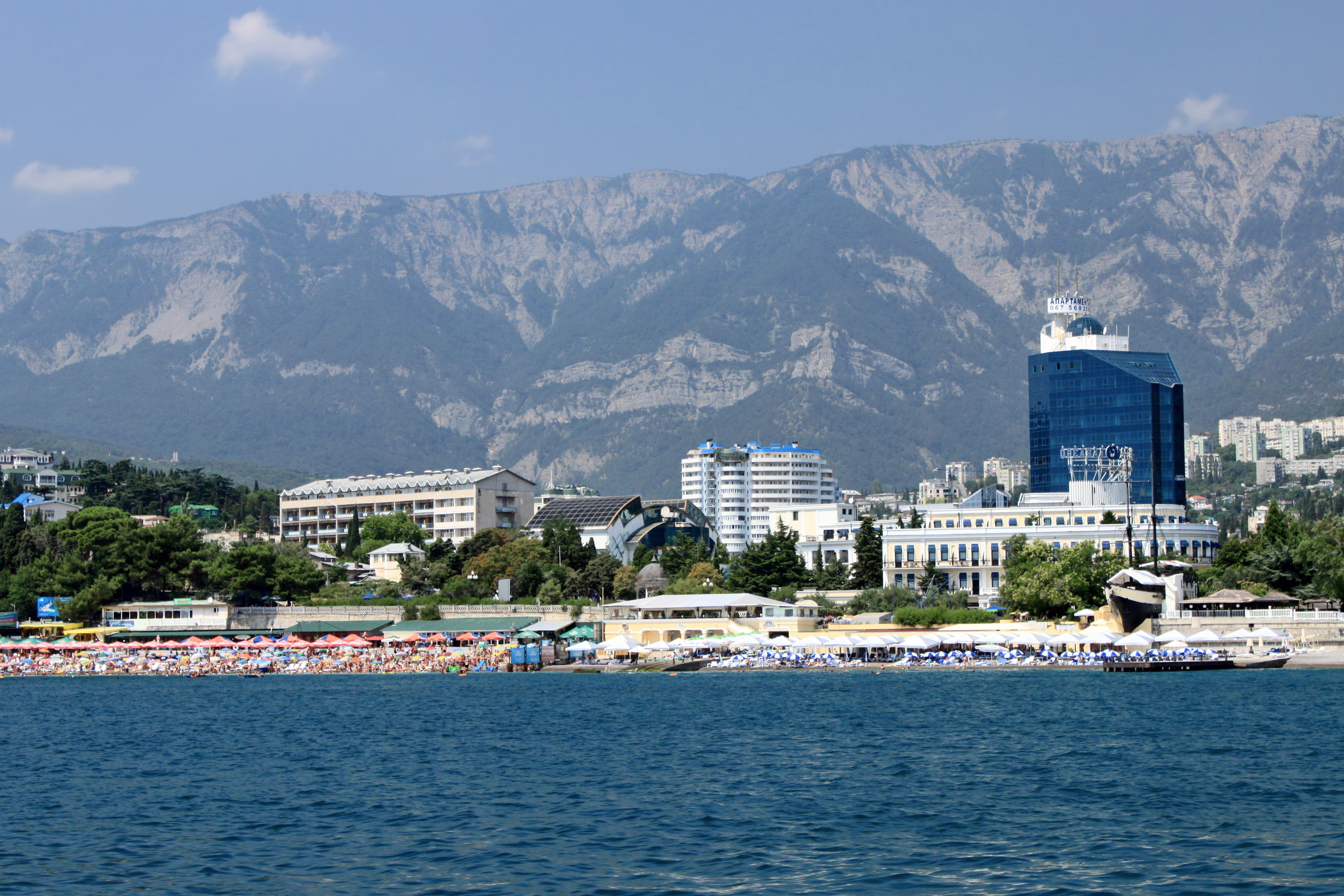
Yalta, meeting place of the Yalta Conference and fifth most populous city in Crimea

== See also ==
- List of cities in Ukraine
