= NUTS statistical regions of Ukraine =

Statistical regions of Ukraine

NUTS 1 regions of Ukraine
- Category: Statistical regions
- Location: Ukraine
- Created: 2024
- Number: 8 (as of 2024)
- Possible types: Group of oblasts of Ukraine (Macroregions)
- Populations: 3.3–6.1 million
- Areas: 49,870–115,862 km^{2} (19,255–44,735 sq mi)
- Subdivisions: NUTS 2 regions of Ukraine

The Nomenclature of Territorial Units for Statistics (NUTS) is a geocode standard for referencing the subdivisions of Ukraine for statistical purposes. The NUTS standard is instrumental in delivering the European Union's Structural Funds. The NUTS code for Ukraine is UA and a hierarchy of three levels is established by Eurostat. Below these is a further levels of geographic organisation - the local administrative unit (LAU). In Ukraine, the LAUs are Hromada. As a candidate country of the European Union, Ukraine (UA) is in the process of being included in the Nomenclature of Territorial Units for Statistics (NUTS).

The first version of NUTS-UA was approved by Order No. 189 of July 18, 2024 and entered into force on January 1, 2025. However, by Order No. 216 of December 1, 2025, NUTS-UA was updated. In particular, instead of 8 macroregions, 9 statistical macroregions were approved.

== Overall ==
=== NUTS Levels ===
Level	Subdivisions	#
NUTS 1	Statistical macroregions (Статистичні макрорегіони)	12
NUTS 2	Oblasts (Oбласті)	27
NUTS 3	Raions (Райони)	138

=== Local administrative units ===
Below the NUTS levels, the two LAU (Local Administrative Units) levels are:

Level	Subdivisions	#
LAU 1	Hromadas (Громади)	1774
LAU 2		

== NUTS codes ==
NUTS 1	Code	NUTS 2	Code	NUTS 3	Code
Macroregion 1	UA1	Poltava Oblast	UA11	Kremenchuk Raion	UA111
		Poltava Oblast	UA11	Lubny Raion	UA112
		Poltava Oblast	UA11	Myrhorod Raion	UA113
		Poltava Oblast	UA11	Poltava Raion	UA114
		Sumy Oblast	UA12	Konotop Raion	UA121
		Sumy Oblast	UA12	Okhtyrka Raion	UA122
		Sumy Oblast	UA12	Romny Raion	UA123
		Sumy Oblast	UA12	Sumy Raion	UA124
		Sumy Oblast	UA12	Shostka Raion	UA125
		Kharkiv Oblast	UA13	Bohodukhiv Raion	UA131
		Kharkiv Oblast	UA13	Izium Raion	UA132
		Kharkiv Oblast	UA13	Berestyn Raion	UA133
		Kharkiv Oblast	UA13	Kupiansk Raion	UA134
		Kharkiv Oblast	UA13	Lozova Raion	UA135
		Kharkiv Oblast	UA13	Kharkiv Raion	UA136
		Kharkiv Oblast	UA13	Chuhuiv Raion	UA137
		Chernihiv Oblast	UA14	Koriukivka Raion	UA141
		Chernihiv Oblast	UA14	Nizhyn Raion	UA142
		Chernihiv Oblast	UA14	Novhorod-Siverskyi Raion	UA143
		Chernihiv Oblast	UA14	Pryluky Raion	UA144
		Chernihiv Oblast	UA14	Chernihiv Raion	UA145
Macroregion 2	UA2	Donetsk Oblast	UA21	Bakhmut Raion	UA211
		Donetsk Oblast	UA21	Volnovakha Raion	UA212
		Donetsk Oblast	UA21	Horlivka Raion	UA213
		Donetsk Oblast	UA21	Donetsk Raion	UA214
		Donetsk Oblast	UA21	Kalmiuske Raion	UA215
		Donetsk Oblast	UA21	Kramatorsk Raion	UA216
		Donetsk Oblast	UA21	Mariupol Raion	UA217
		Donetsk Oblast	UA21	Pokrovsk Raion	UA218
		Luhansk Oblast	UA22	Alchevsk Raion	UA221
		Luhansk Oblast	UA22	Dovzhansk Raion	UA222
		Luhansk Oblast	UA22	Luhansk Raion	UA223
		Luhansk Oblast	UA22	Rovenky Raion	UA224
		Luhansk Oblast	UA22	Svatove Raion	UA225
		Luhansk Oblast	UA22	Sievierodonetsk Raion	UA226
		Luhansk Oblast	UA22	Starobilsk Raion	UA227
		Luhansk Oblast	UA22	Shchastia Raion	UA228
Macroregion 3	UA3	Dnipropetrovsk Oblast	UA31	Dnipro Raion	UA311
		Dnipropetrovsk Oblast	UA31	Kamianske Raion	UA312
		Dnipropetrovsk Oblast	UA31	Kryvyi Rih Raion	UA313
		Dnipropetrovsk Oblast	UA31	Nikopol Raion	UA314
		Dnipropetrovsk Oblast	UA31	Novomoskovskiy Raion	UA315
		Dnipropetrovsk Oblast	UA31	Pavlohrad Raion	UA316
		Dnipropetrovsk Oblast	UA31	Synelnykove Raion	UA317
		Zaporizhia Oblast	UA32	Berdyansk Raion	UA321
		Zaporizhia Oblast	UA32	Vasylivskyi Raion	UA322
		Zaporizhia Oblast	UA32	Zaporizhia Raion	UA323
		Zaporizhia Oblast	UA32	Melitopol Raion	UA324
		Zaporizhia Oblast	UA32	Polohy Raion	UA325
		Kirovohrad Oblast	UA33	Holovanivskyi Raion	UA331
		Kirovohrad Oblast	UA33	Kropyvnytskyi Raion	UA332
		Kirovohrad Oblast	UA33	Novoukrainskyi Raion	UA333
		Kirovohrad Oblast	UA33	Oleksandriia Raion	UA334
Macroregion 4	UA4	Mykolaiv Oblast	UA41	Bashtanka Raion	UA411
		Mykolaiv Oblast	UA41	Voznesensk Raion	UA412
		Mykolaiv Oblast	UA41	Mykolaiv Raion	UA413
		Mykolaiv Oblast	UA41	Pervomaisk Raion	UA414
		Odesa Oblast	UA42	Berezivka Raion	UA421
		Odesa Oblast	UA42	Bilhorod-Dnistrovskyi Raion	UA422
		Odesa Oblast	UA42	Bolhrad Raion	UA423
		Odesa Oblast	UA42	Izmail Raion	UA424
		Odesa Oblast	UA42	Odessa Raion	UA425
		Odesa Oblast	UA42	Podilskyi Raion	UA426
		Odesa Oblast	UA42	Rozdilna Raion	UA427
		Kherson Oblast	UA43	Beryslavskyi Raion	UA431
		Kherson Oblast	UA43	Henichesk Raion	UA432
		Kherson Oblast	UA43	Kakhovka Raion	UA433
		Kherson Oblast	UA43	Skadovsk Raion	UA434
		Kherson Oblast	UA43	Kherson Raion	UA435
		Autonomous Republic of Crimea	UA44	Bakhchysarai Raion	UA441
		Autonomous Republic of Crimea	UA44	Bilohirsk Raion	UA442
		Autonomous Republic of Crimea	UA44	Dzhankoi Raion	UA443
		Autonomous Republic of Crimea	UA44	Yevpatoria Raion	UA444
		Autonomous Republic of Crimea	UA44	Kerch Raion	UA445
		Autonomous Republic of Crimea	UA44	Krasnohvardiiske Raion	UA446
		Autonomous Republic of Crimea	UA44	Krasnoperekopsk Raion	UA447
		Autonomous Republic of Crimea	UA44	Simferopol Raion	UA448
		Autonomous Republic of Crimea	UA44	Feodosia Raion	UA449
		Autonomous Republic of Crimea	UA44	Yalta Raion	UA44A
		Sevastopol City	UA45	Sevastopol City	UA450
Macroregion 5	UA5	Vinnytsia Oblast	UA51	Vinnytsia Raion	UA511
		Vinnytsia Oblast	UA51	Haisyn Raion	UA512
		Vinnytsia Oblast	UA51	Zhmerynka Raion	UA513
		Vinnytsia Oblast	UA51	Mohyliv-Podilskyi Raion	UA514
		Vinnytsia Oblast	UA51	Tulchyn Raion	UA515
		Vinnytsia Oblast	UA51	Khmilnyk Raion	UA516
		Ternopil Oblast	UA52	Kremenets Raion	UA521
		Ternopil Oblast	UA52	Ternopil Raion	UA522
		Ternopil Oblast	UA52	Chortkiv Raion	UA523
		Khmelnytskyi Oblast	UA53	Kamianets-Podilskyi Raion	UA531
		Khmelnytskyi Oblast	UA53	Khmelnytskyi Raion	UA532
		Khmelnytskyi Oblast	UA53	Shepetivskyi Raion	UA533
Macroregion 6	UA6	Kyiv Oblast	UA61	Bilotserkivskyi Raion	UA611
		Kyiv Oblast	UA61	Boryspil Raion	UA612
		Kyiv Oblast	UA61	Brovarskyi Raion	UA613
		Kyiv Oblast	UA61	Bucha Raion	UA614
		Kyiv Oblast	UA61	Vyshhorod Raion	UA615
		Kyiv Oblast	UA61	Obukhiv Raion	UA616
		Kyiv Oblast	UA61	Fastiv Raion	UA617
		Cherkasy Oblast	UA62	Zvenyhorodka Raion	UA621
		Cherkasy Oblast	UA62	Zolotonosha Raion	UA622
		Cherkasy Oblast	UA62	Uman Raion	UA623
		Cherkasy Oblast	UA62	Cherkasy Raion	UA624
		Kyiv	UA63	Kyiv	UA630
Macroregion 7	UA7	Zakarpattia Oblast	UA71	Berehove Raion	UA711
		Zakarpattia Oblast	UA71	Mukachevo Raion	UA712
		Zakarpattia Oblast	UA71	Rakhiv Raion	UA713
		Zakarpattia Oblast	UA71	Tyachiv Raion	UA714
		Zakarpattia Oblast	UA71	Uzhhorod Raion	UA715
		Zakarpattia Oblast	UA71	Khust Raion	UA716
		Ivano-Frankivsk Oblast	UA72	Verkhovyna Raion	UA721
		Ivano-Frankivsk Oblast	UA72	Ivano-Frankivsk Raion	UA722
		Ivano-Frankivsk Oblast	UA72	Kalush Raion	UA723
		Ivano-Frankivsk Oblast	UA72	Kolomyia Raion	UA724
		Ivano-Frankivsk Oblast	UA72	Kosiv Raion	UA725
		Ivano-Frankivsk Oblast	UA72	Nadvirna Raion	UA726
		Lviv Oblast	UA73	Drohobych Raion	UA731
		Lviv Oblast	UA73	Zolochiv Raion	UA732
		Lviv Oblast	UA73	Lviv Raion	UA733
		Lviv Oblast	UA73	Sambirskyi Raion	UA734
		Lviv Oblast	UA73	Stryi Raion	UA735
		Lviv Oblast	UA73	Chervonohrad Raion	UA736
		Lviv Oblast	UA73	Yavoriv Raion	UA737
		Chernivtsi Oblast	UA74	Vyzhnytskyi Raion	UA741
		Chernivtsi Oblast	UA74	Dniester Raion	UA742
		Chernivtsi Oblast	UA74	Chernivtsi Raion	UA743
Macroregion 8	UA8	Volyn Oblast	UA81	Volodymyrskyi Raion	UA811
		Volyn Oblast	UA81	Kamin-Kashyrskyi Raion	UA812
		Volyn Oblast	UA81	Kovelskyi Raion	UA813
		Volyn Oblast	UA81	Lutsk Raion	UA814
		Zhytomyr Oblast	UA82	Berdychiv Raion	UA821
		Zhytomyr Oblast	UA82	Zhytomyr Raion	UA822
		Zhytomyr Oblast	UA82	Korosten Raion	UA823
		Zhytomyr Oblast	UA82	Zviahel Raion	UA824
		Rivne Oblast	UA83	Varash Raion	UA831
		Rivne Oblast	UA83	Dubno Raion	UA832
		Rivne Oblast	UA83	Rivne Raion	UA833
		Rivne Oblast	UA83	Sarny Raion	UA834

== Sources ==
NUTS 2 regions of Ukraine
- Category: Statistical regions
- Location: Ukraine
- Found in: NUTS 1 regions of Ukraine
- Created: 2024
- Number: 27 (as of 2024)
- Possible types: Oblasts (24); Cities with special status (2); Autonomous republic (1)
- Subdivisions: NUTS 3 regions of Ukraine

- STATISTICAL CLASSIFICATION OF TERRITORIAL UNITS OF UKRAINE (NUTS-UA)
- NUTS-3 of Ukraine
- NUTS Regions EUROSTAT

== External ==
- Territorial units in Russia, Ukraine, Belarus and Moldova and NUTS classification
