= Inkerman =

City in Crimea

Inkerman Инкерман Інкерман İnkerman
- City
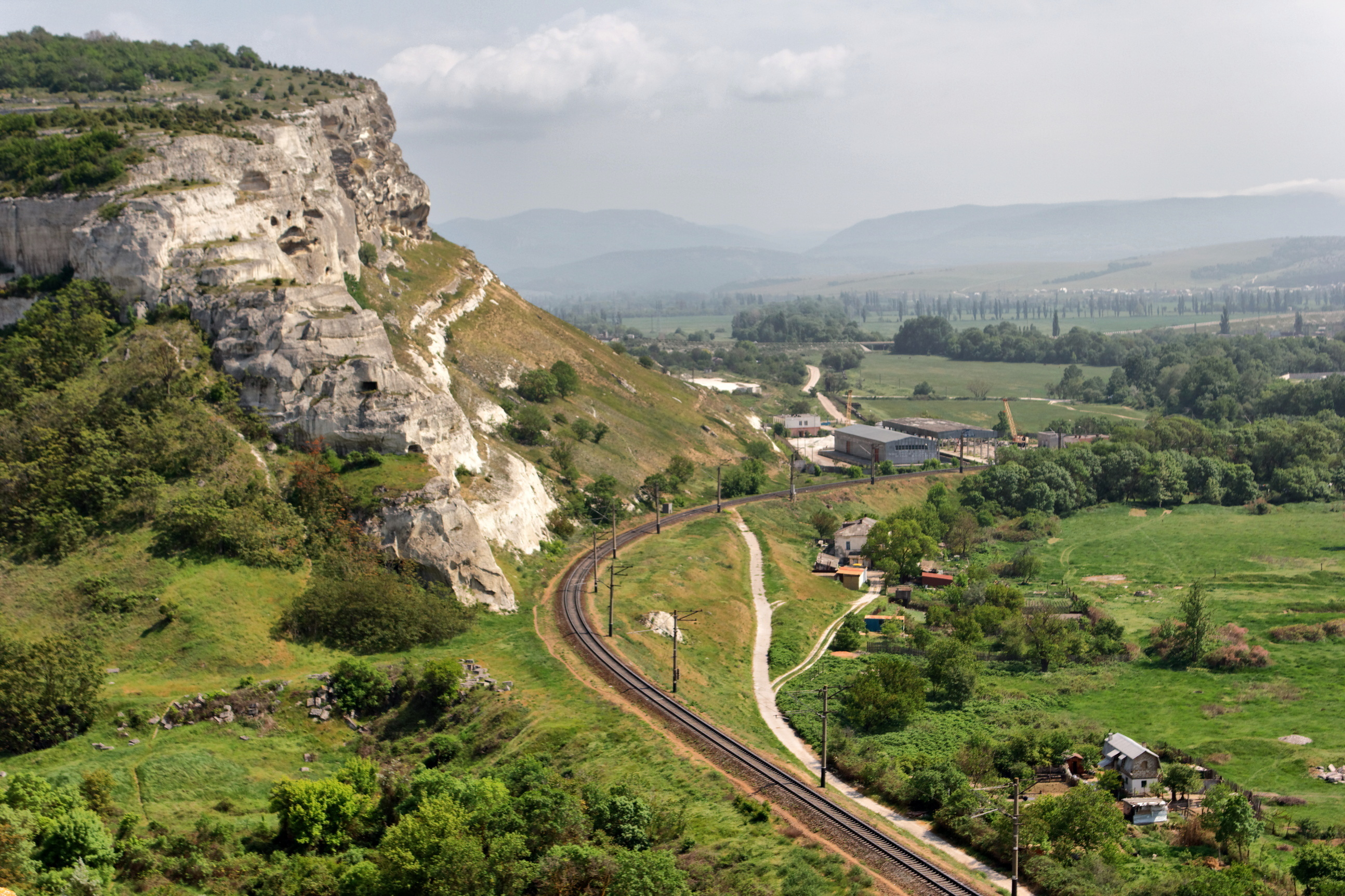
- The urban areas on the west bank of the Chorna River have been converted into rural settlements

- Flag Coat of arms
- Interactive map of Inkerman
- Location of Inkerman within Crimea
- Coordinates: 44°37′7″N 33°36′21″E
- Country: Disputed: Ukraine (de jure); Russia (de facto)
- Autonomous republic: Crimea (de jure)
- Raion: Bakhchysarai Raion (de jure)
- Federal subject: Sevastopol (de facto)
- Elevation: 50 m (160 ft)

Population (2014)
  - Total: 10,348
- Time zone: UTC+4 (MSK)
- Postal code: 299703 — 299709
- Area code: 8692
- Former names: Kalamita (until 1475), Belokamensk (1976 — 1991)

Inkerman (Russian: Инкерман; Ukrainian: Інкерман; Crimean Tatar: İnkerman) is a city in the Crimean peninsula. It is de jure located within the Autonomous Republic of Crimea of Ukraine, but de facto within the federal city of Sevastopol, which is administered as part of the Russian Federation. It lies 5 kilometres (3 miles) east of Sevastopol, at the mouth of the Chernaya River which flows into Sevastopol Inlet (also called the North Inlet). Administratively, Inkerman was subordinate to the municipality of Sevastopol, but since September 2023 it de jure became a part of Bakhchysarai Raion of AR Crimea. The city's population is 10,348 (2014 Census).

The name Inkerman is said to mean 'cave fortress' in Turkish. During the Soviet era, the area was known between 1976 and 1991 as Bilokamiansk (Ukrainian: Білокам'янськ) or Belokamensk (Russian: Белокаменск), which literally means 'white stone city', in reference to the soft white stone quarried in the area and commonly used for construction. In 1991 the Ukrainian authorities restored the pre-1976 name.

== History ==
The area has been inhabited since ancient times. The cave monastery of St. Clement was founded near Inkerman in the 8th century by Byzantine icon-venerators fleeing persecution in their homeland. The monastery was closed during the Soviet era and several of its churches destroyed but is now in restoration and brought back into use.

The city was called Kalamita (Greek: Καλαμίτα) and was a medieval fortress built in the 8th-9th century on a strategic cliff overlooking the estuary and later expanded in the 14th century. In 1475 Kalamita, along with the rest of the Principality of Theodoro, was taken by the Turks, and Kalamita would be renamed Inkerman. After the Treaty of Küçük Kaynarca in 1774 the fortress was abandoned and fell into ruin, but a small settlement at the base of the cliff remained.

Martin Bronevski who visited Inkerman in 1578 saw several Greek inscriptions.

The town became the centre of worldwide attention in 1854 during the Crimean War, when Inkerman was the scene of the Battle of Inkerman and the Battle of Chernaya River, both victorious for the French and the British troops.

During the Soviet times, a large underground ammunition warehouse of the Black Sea Fleet was situated under rocky cliffs in the Inkerman area. The storage was abandoned in the 1970s after an explosion that damaged the facility but did not detonate all its stockpiles. However, no efforts to secure the site were made until the 1990s when local residents began salvaging explosives which led to a number of deaths. Ukrainian Army engineer corps started extracting and decommissioning outdated ammunition in 2000 under a special government program.

Inkerman has since largely returned to its pre-war obscurity, serving as a suburb of Sevastopol linked to the downtown core by commuter ferries. One of the major Crimean wineries featuring the Inkerman label is located in the adjacent area. A popular hiking trail leading into Crimean Mountains begins just east of the town.

A horse in the Household Cavalry Blues and Royals has been named after the town and battle.

The left flank company of the 1st Battalion Grenadier Guards, which holds the traditions of the disbanded 3rd Battalion (which played a large part of the battle) is named after the town and battle. Now known as the Inkerman Company, or by its nickname "The Ribs".

== Demographics ==
As of the 2001 Ukrainian census, Inkerman had a population of 10,456 inhabitants. The majority of the population are ethnic Russians, followed by a large Ukrainian minority, as well as smaller Belarusian and Crimean Tatar communities. Linguistically, the population is overwhelmingly Russophone, while a share of native Ukrainian speakers just exceeds 5%. The exact ethnic and linguistic composition was as follows:

Ethnic groups in Inkerman
	percent
Russians	73.00%
Ukrainians	20.71%
Belarusians	1.29%
Tatars	0.41%
Moldovans	0.30%
Crimean Tatars	0.27%
Armenians	0.16%
Azerbaijanis	0.14%
Poles	0.12%
others	3.60%

First languages in Inkerman
	percent
Russian	91.2%
Ukrainian	5.2%
Crimean Tatar	0.2%
Belarusian	0.1%
Armenian	0.1%
Romanian	0.1%
others	0.6%

== Gallery ==
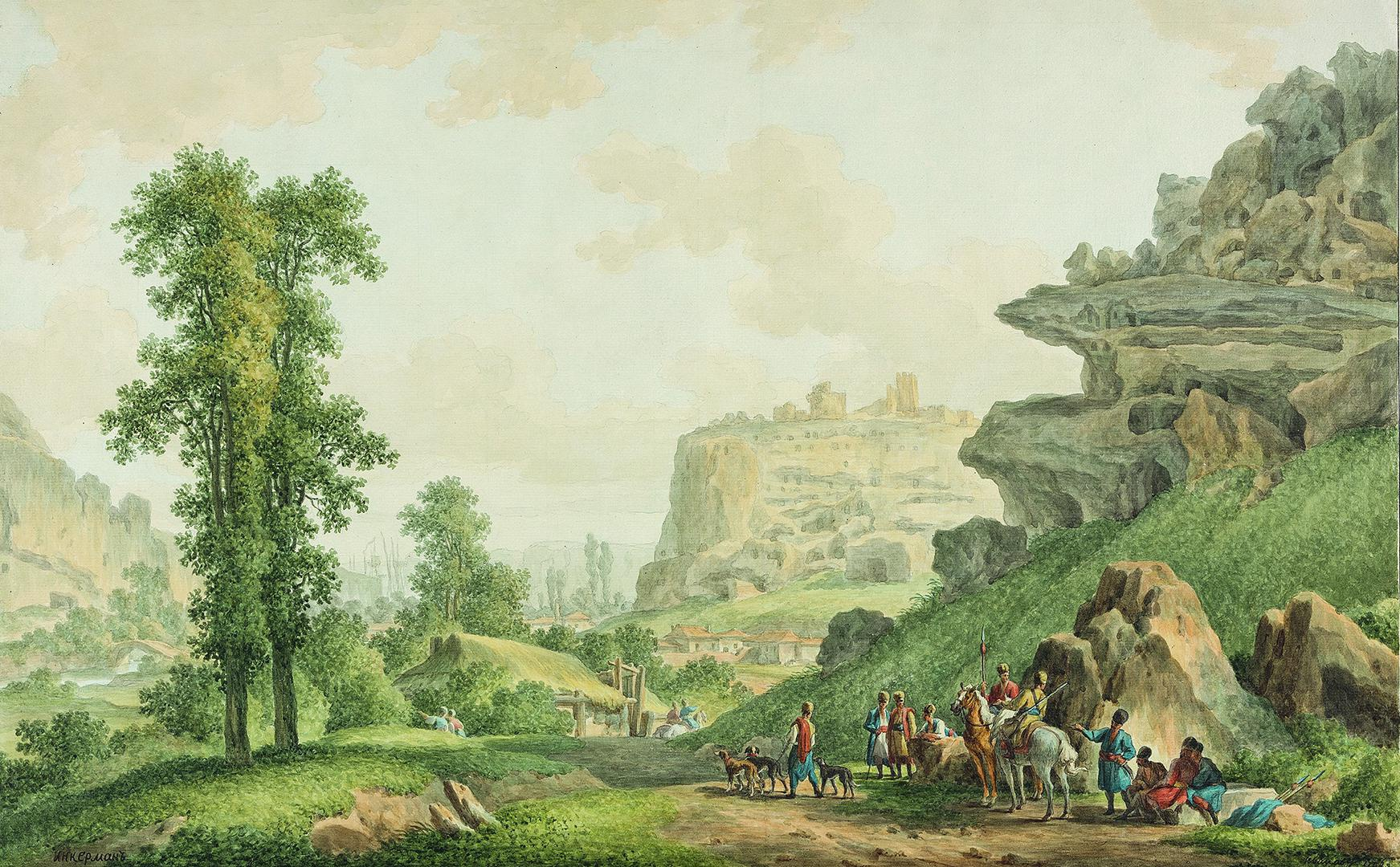
View of Inkerman Fortress in 1796, M. M. Ivanov

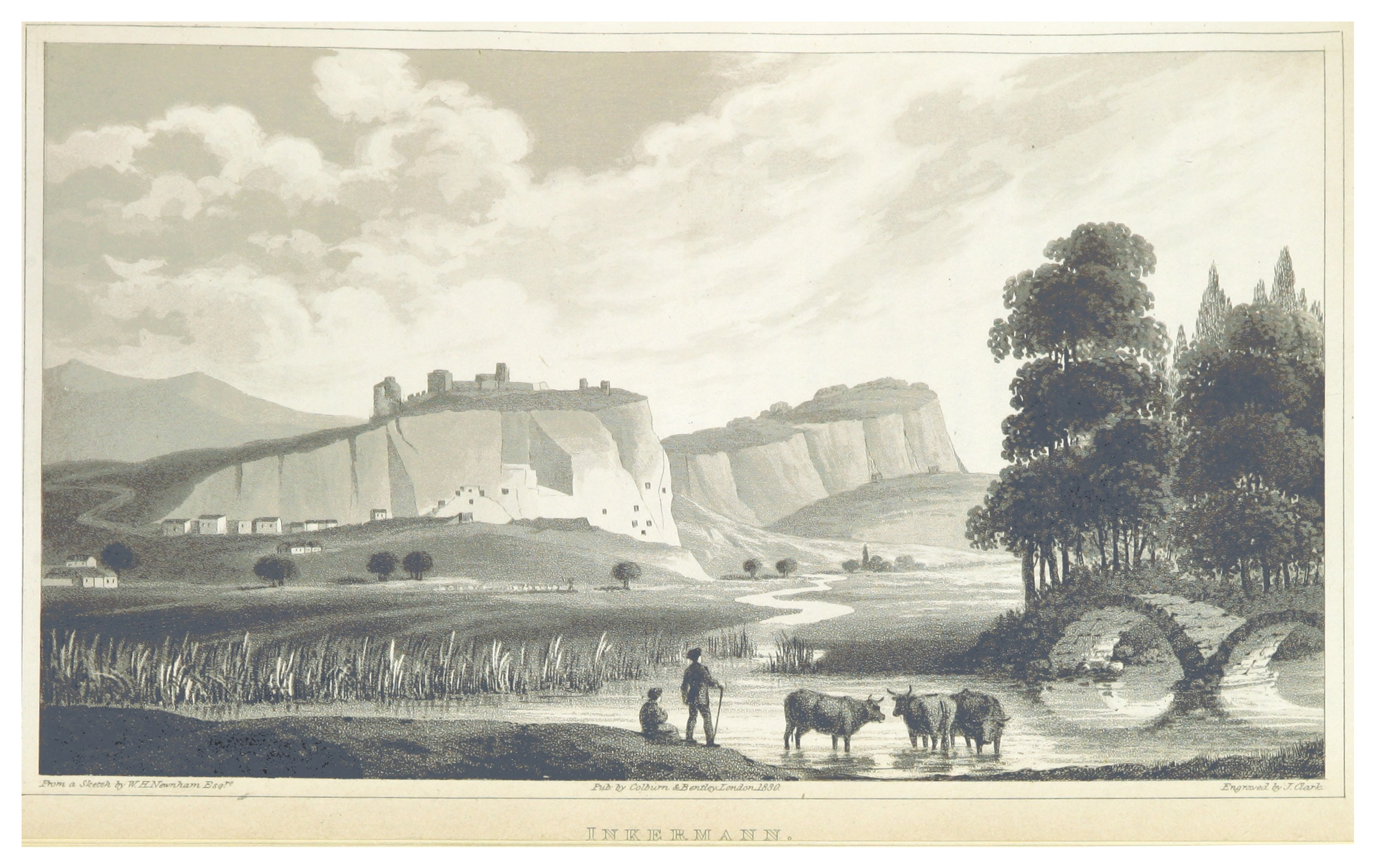
Inkerman around 1830

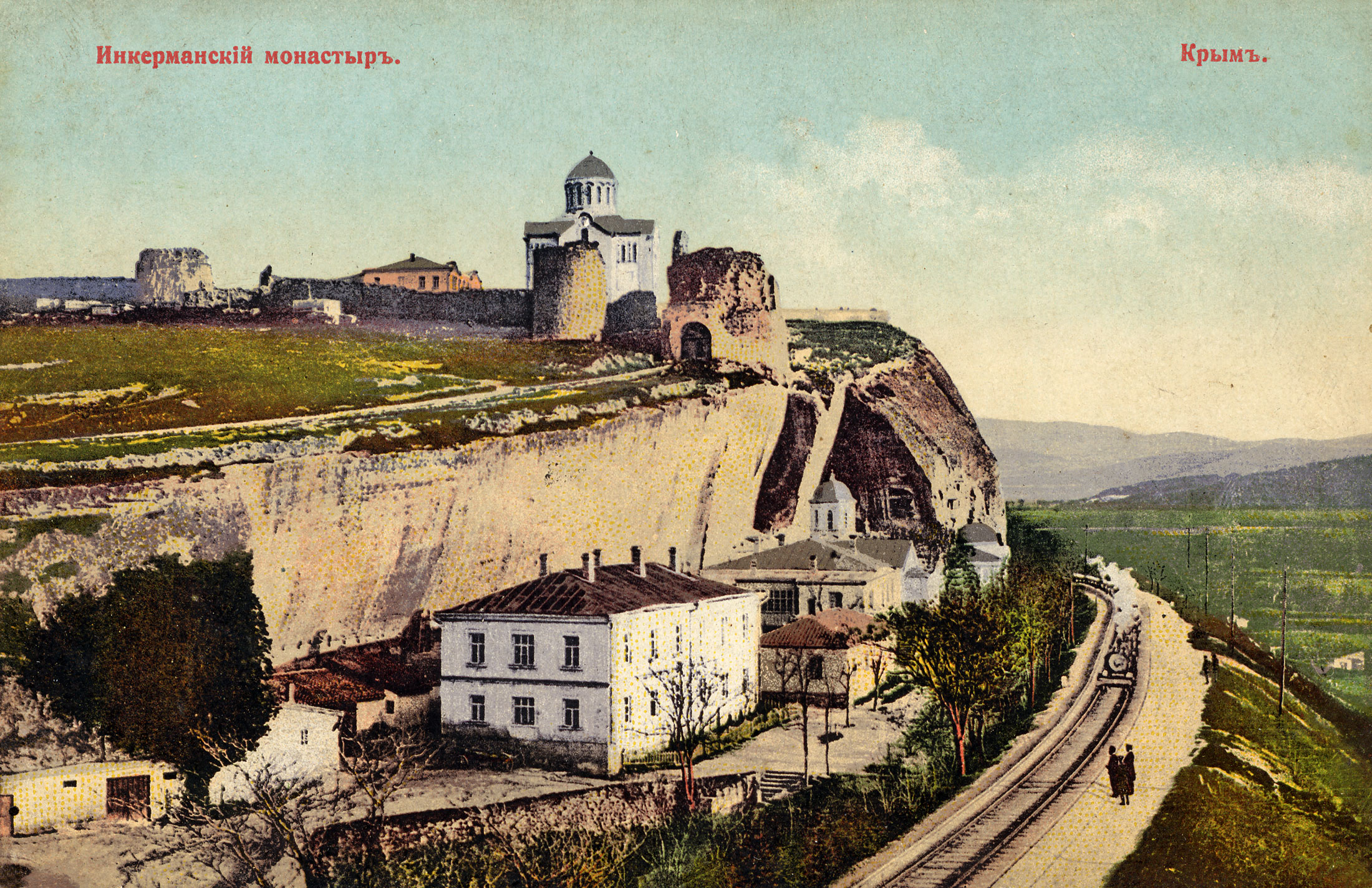
Inkerman Cave Monastery around 1910

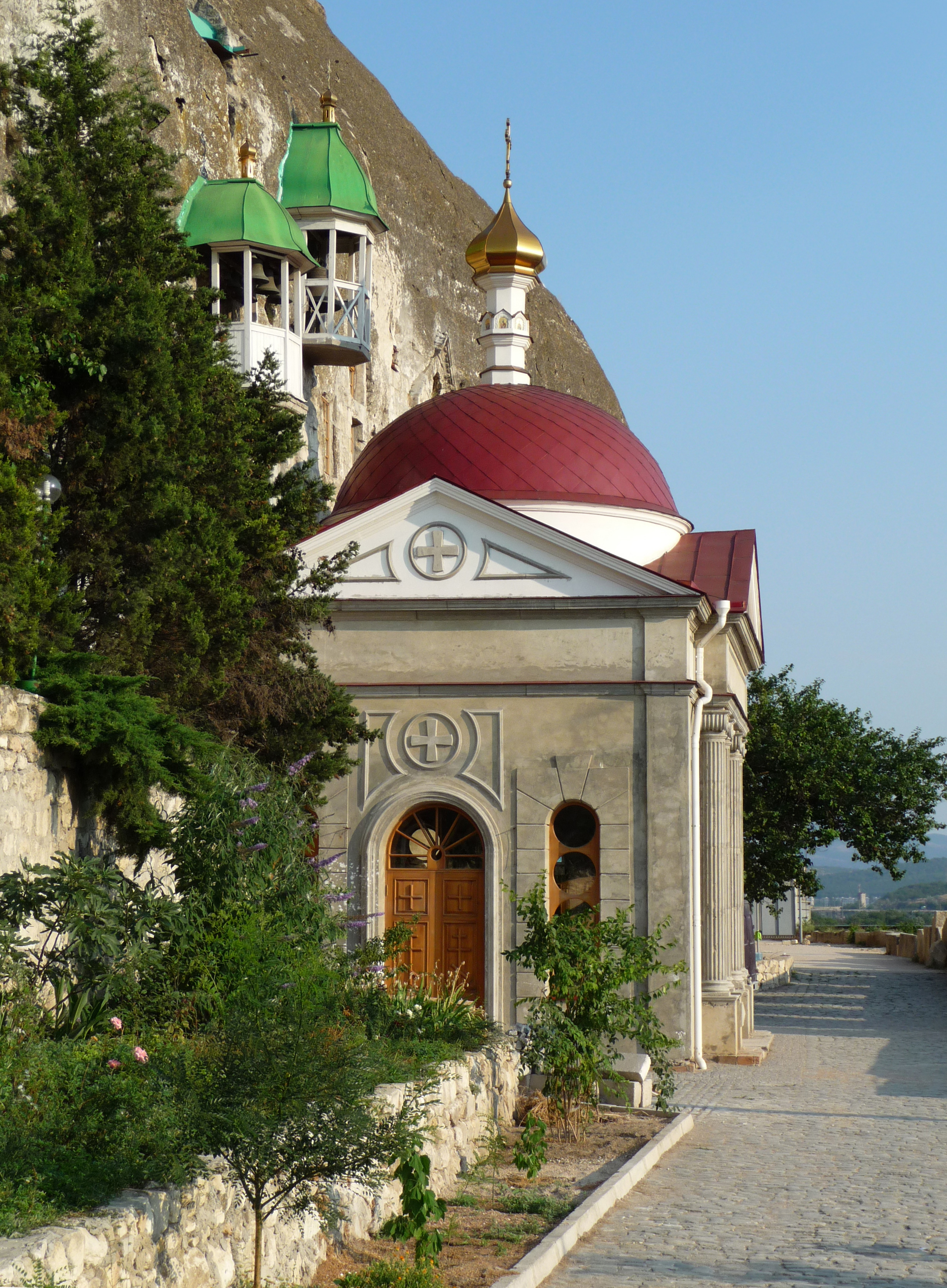
Inkerman orthodox men's cave monastery of St. Clement in 2009

== See also ==
- Gulf of Kalamita
- Hicks Withers-Lancashire
