= Sovietskyi =

Sovietskyi / Ichki Советский / Ічкі / İçki
- Rural settlement (de jure); Urban-type settlement (de facto)
- Interactive map of Sovietskyi / Ichki
- Location of Sovietskyi in Crimea
- Coordinates: 45°20′49″N 34°56′00″E
- Country: Ukraine (de jure); Russia (de facto)
- Republic: AR Crimea (de jure); Republic of Crimea (de facto)
- District: Feodosia Raion (de jure); Sovietskyi Raion (de facto)

Government
  - Town Head: Andriy Prytulenko
- Elevation: 19 m (62 ft)

Population (2014)
  - Total: 10,324
- Time zone: UTC+4 (MSK)
- Postal code: 97200
- Area code: +380 6551
- Website: http://rada.gov.ua/

Sovietskyi (Ukrainian: Совєтський; Russian: Советский) or Ichki (Ukrainian: Ічкі; Russian: Ички; Crimean Tatar: İçki) is an urban-type settlement in the Autonomous Republic of Crimea, a territory recognized by a majority of countries as part of Ukraine and incorporated by Russia as the Republic of Crimea. The town also serves as the administrative center of the Sovietskyi Raion (district), housing the district's local administration buildings.

Since the Annexation of Crimea by the Russian Federation in 2014, the town has been under de facto Russian control. In 2016, the Verkhovna Rada passed decommunization legislation that renamed this town to Ichki (Ukrainian: Ічкі), though it hasn't yet been implemented since Ukraine doesn't control the town as of 2024.

== History ==
The area around today's settlement likely began between 3,000 and 1,000 BC. The first mention of the modern town in 1784 in a historian's report.

Following the 1783 annexation of Crimea by the Russian Empire, the town became under Russian control. Since then, the town has administratively fallen under different districts, mainly in the Taurida Governorate.

At the beginning of 1941, up to 5,400 people lived in the village of Ichki, and it was classified as an urban-type settlement.

On December 14, 1944, as part of the Soviet Union's de-tatarization efforts, the government renamed the village from Ichki to Sovietskyi.

Following the dissolution of the Soviet Union, Crimea participated and voted in favor of independence during the Ukrainian independence referendum, and Sovietskyi became part of the Autonomous Republic of Crimea in Ukraine in 1991.

In 2014, the town came under Russian control following the beginning of Russian occupation of Crimea and the subsequent Russian annexation.

In 2015, the Verkhovna Rada included Sovietskyi in a list of settlements that required renaming as part of the Ukrainian government's decommunization efforts.

On May 12, 2016, the Verkhovna Rada approved legislation that legally changed the town's name back to Ichki, and also the Sovietskyi Raion to Ichki Raion.

In 2023, the Ukrainian parliament passed a legislation redefining types of settlements, and most urban-type settlements, including Sovietskyi / Ichki, have been changed to be a rural settlement.

== Demographics ==
As of the 2001 Ukrainian Census, its population is 10,963.

As of 2014, the population is 10,324 (2014 Census).

== Education ==
- College of Hydraulic Land Reclamation and Agricultural Mechanization (Branch), Crimean Federal University
