= Hicks Withers-Lancashire =

British veterinary surgeon

Hicks Withers-Lancashire (1829 – 31 January 1909), also known as Hicks Withers, was a British veterinary surgeon.

He was born in Ham Green in Somerset to Samuel Withers, a veterinary surgeon, and Martha Lancashire.

He graduated in London on 30 April 1851. Hicks joined the army as Veterinary Surgeon with the Royal Horse Artillery on 6 March 1854. He was involved in the Crimean War and was present at the Charge of the Light Brigade, the Alma, Sebastapol, Balaklava and Inkerman. Later, in the Indian Rebellion of 1857, he was at the relief of the Siege of Lucknow. He was promoted to 1st Class Veterinary Surgeon on 21 November 1861. In 1864 he was appointed to the 10th Hussars where he remained until 2 January 1869.

After he left the army Withers adopted the surname Lancashire as a racing name; he owned a number of steeple-chasers including Brunswick which finished fourth in the 1890 Grand National.

In the 1890s, he became the Lord of the manor of Stockbridge in Hampshire until 1902 when it was sold to Mr. R. P. Attenborough.
