= Alupka =

City in the Crimean peninsula

Alupka Алупка
- City
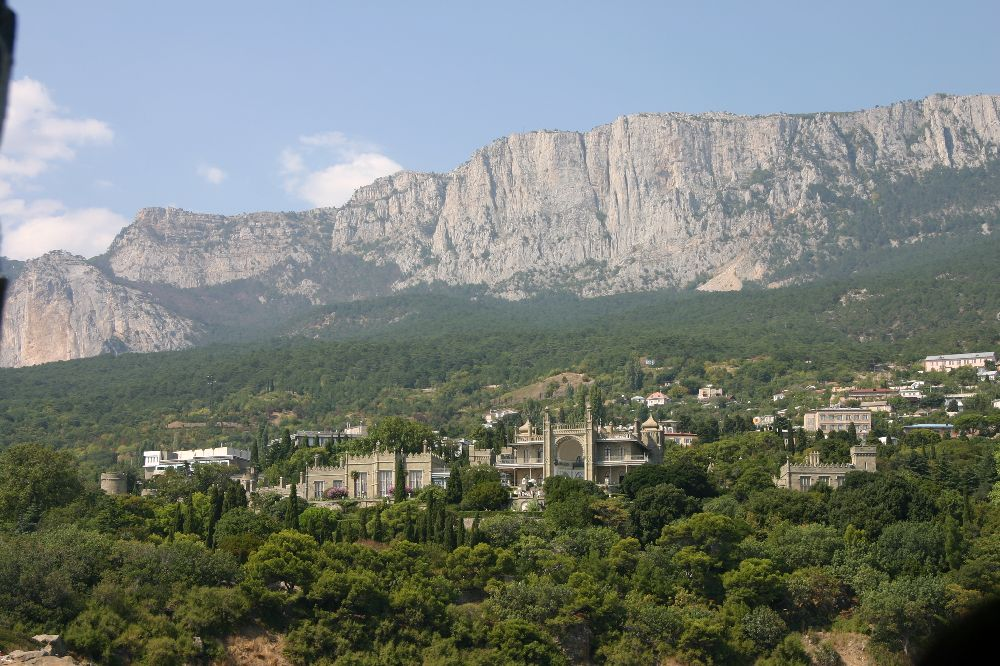
- The Vorontsov Palace with the dominant Crimean Mountains in the background.

- Flag Coat of arms
- Interactive map of Alupka
- Location within Crimea Location within Ukraine Location within European Russia
- Coordinates: 44°25′11″N 34°2′35″E
- Municipality: Yalta Municipality
- Location in Ukraine: Autonomous Republic of Crimea
- Location in Russia: Republic of Crimea
- City status: 1938

Government
  - City Head: Viktor Tolstonoh

Area
  - Total: 4.2246 km^{2} (1.6311 sq mi)
- Elevation: 67 m (220 ft)

Population (2021)
  - Total: 8,087
  - Density: 1,914/km^{2} (4,958/sq mi)
- Time zone: UTC+4 (MSK)
- Postal code: (2)98676
- Area code: +7-3654
- Climate: Cfa
- Website: alupkarada.org, (Ukrainian) alupka24.ru (Russian)

Alupka (Ukrainian and Russian: Алупка; Crimean Tatar: Alupka; Greek: Ἀλώπηξ, Alòpex) is a resort city located in the Crimean peninsula, a de jure territory of Ukraine that is de facto controlled by the Russian Federation since 2014 (see 2014 Crimean crisis). It is located 17 km (11 mi) to the west of Yalta. It is famous for the Vorontsov Palace, designed by English architect Edward Blore in an extravagant mixture of Scottish baronial and Neo-Moorish styles and built in 1828–1846 for prince Mikhail Semyonovich Vorontsov.

Alupka and its surrounding area is full of resort hotels on the shore of the Black Sea, where thousands of travelers (particularly from the former Soviet Union) travel every year. Public transport to Alupka includes the bus system (bus routes #26 and #27 from Yalta) and other road vehicles.

== Geography ==
=== Location ===
The city is located in the Crimean peninsula, a territory of Ukraine, currently annexed by Russian Federation (see 2014 Crimean crisis). It is located 17 km (11 mi) to the west of Yalta.

=== Climate ===
Located in the subtropical climate of southern Crimea, Alupka has an average temperature of +3–4 °C (37–39 °F) in January–February and an average temperature of +24.6 °C (76.3 °F) in August. The average rainfall in the city is 400 mm per year, the average humidity is about 69%, and the average number of sunlight per year is 2,150 hours. The swimming season stretches from March until October, with an average water temperature of 22–28 °C (72–82 °F).

== History ==
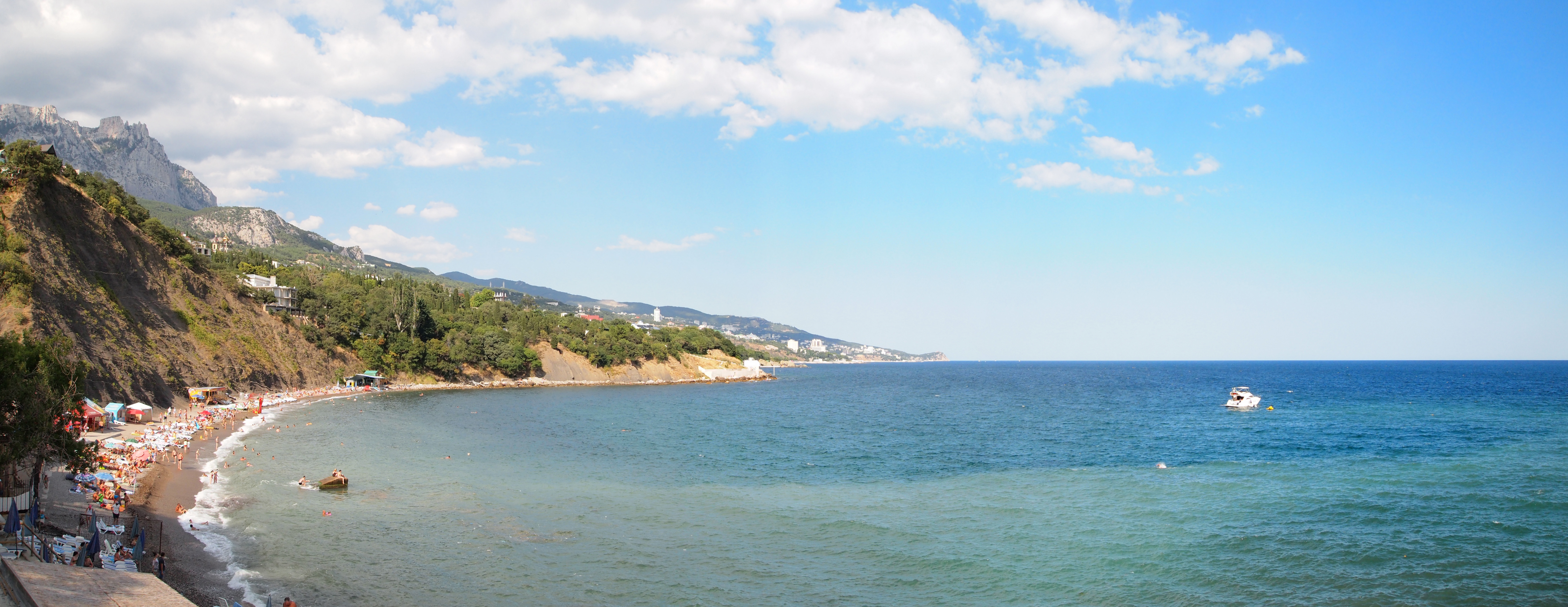
The Black Sea coast at Alupka

Alupka was first founded as a Greek settlement. The name originates from the Greek word for fox (Alopex) . After the Greeks, Alupka came under control of the Byzantine Empire. The first written mention of Alupka dates to 960 in a document about the Byzantine Emperor Romanos II. Later on, Alupka was controlled by the Crimean Tatars. After 1783 the city came into possession of Grigori Alexandrovich Potemkin, governor-general of the Novorossiya Krai. In 1798, the city had a population of 211, consisting mainly of farmers.

At the end of 19th and beginning of the 20th centuries, Alupka was a famous resort. In the middle of 19th century it was more popular than Yalta, mostly because of the work of the Governor of Novorossia at the time, Mikhail Vorontsov, who built a Palace there (some call it a Castle).

Alupka is described by a French traveler in 1811 in his letters to a friend (starting at page127) "Voyage de Moscou à Vienne, par Kiow, Odessa, Constantinople, Bucharest et Hermanstadt; ou, Lettres adressées à Jules Griffith Auguste de Lagarde" Jan 1824 · Treuttel et Würtz: Voyage de Moscou à Vienne, par Kiow, Odessa, Constantinople, Bucharest et Hermanstadt, ou, Lettres adressées à Jules Griffith

It was occupied by forces of Nazi Germany during Operation Barbarossa on November 8th 1941, administered in Reichskommissariat Ukraine as Generalbezirk Krym-Taurien, and recaptured by forces of the Soviet Union on April 16th 1944.

A protest happened in Alupka on August 3rd, 2008.

During the Russian annexation of Crimea in 2014, it was captured by unmarked Russian forces on February 24th, although fully solidified control on February 27th after the capture of the Crimean parliament in Simferopol. Later, after a referendum in March 16th, Crimea as well as Alupka became an official part of Russia, continued to be unrecognized as Russian by many countries.

== Attractions ==
Alupka is not only a resort town, but also an important tourist attraction. Major attractions in the city include:

- Vorontsov Palace
- Vorontsov's Park, located on the grounds of the Vorontsov Palace
- Ai-Petri Mountain

=== Vorontsovsky Palace and Park ===
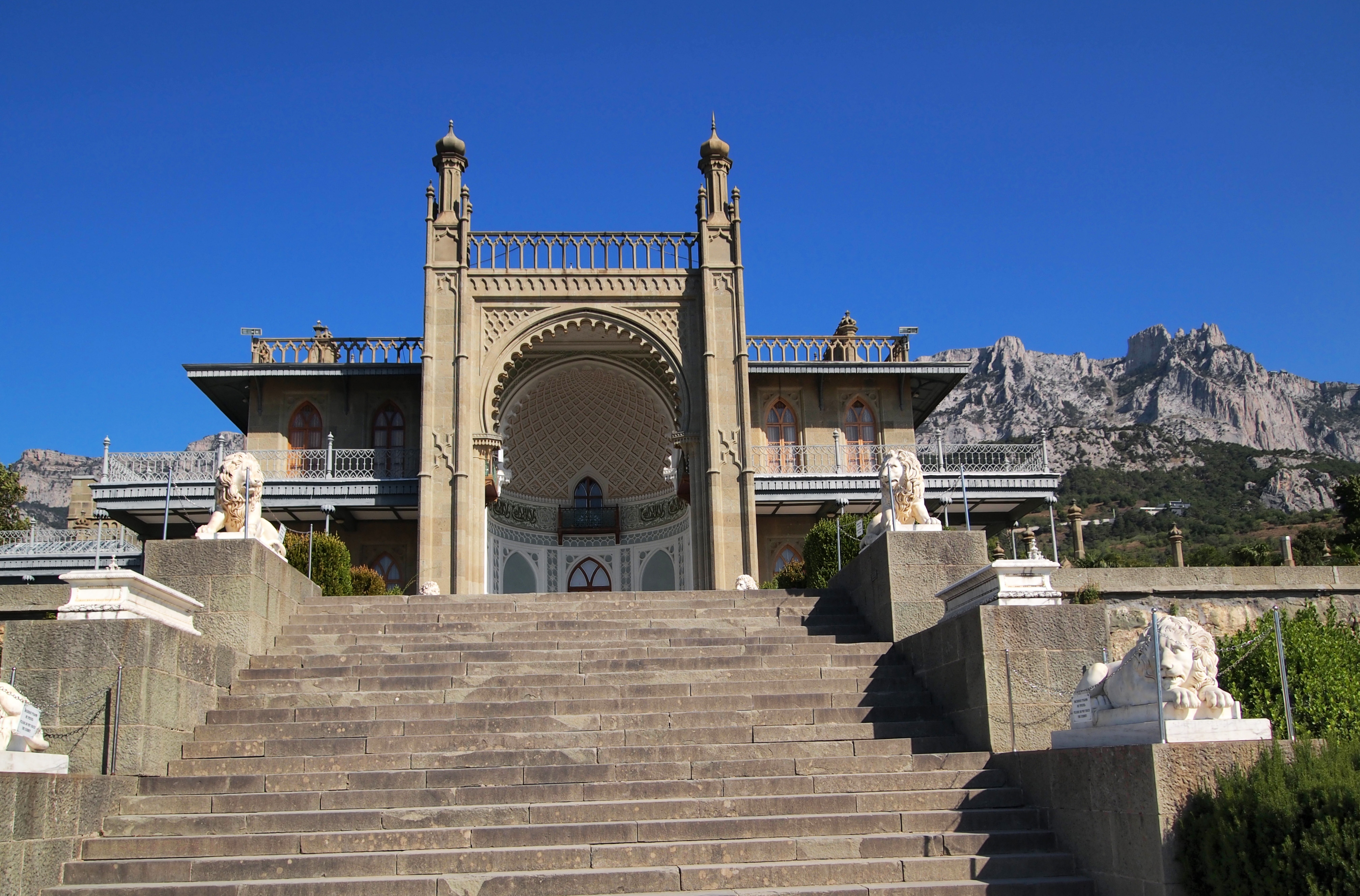
The southern façade of the Vorontsov Palace.

The main attraction of Alupka is the Scottish baronial and Neo-Moorish style Vorontsov's Palace, which was designed by the English architect Edward Blore built in 1828-1846 for prince Mikhail Semyonovich Vorontsov. During the Yalta Conference, the palace—spared by the Germans during World War II — served as the residence of Sir Winston Churchill and his English delegation.

A large English-style park was designed and built for prince Vorontsov on the territory of the Vorontsov's Palace. The park was constructed from December 1824 to April 1851, and was envisioned, designed, created, and maintained by Chief Botanist of the Southern Shore of the Crimea, Carolus Antonius Keebach. Plant material for the garden was supplied from the Nikita Botanic Garden by its director, Nicolai Anders von Hartwiss.

There is also a selection of various Hotels and restaurants. There are many things to do in central Alupka such as look at Ai Petri mountain and even take a cable car there.

=== Ai-Petri Mountain ===
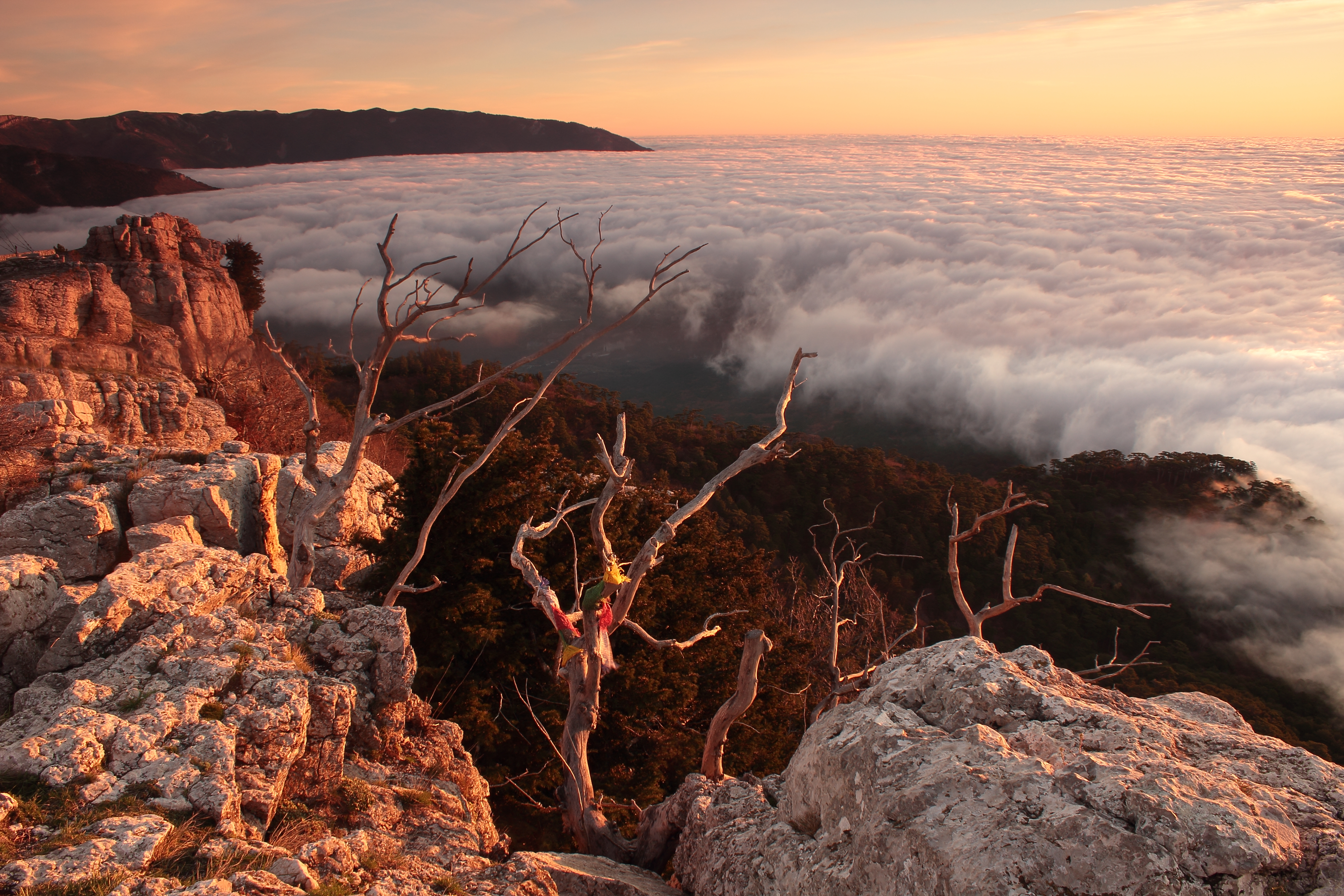
Dawn in the Ai-Petri Yaila nature reserve

Alupka is located at the foot of the 1234 meter Ai-Petri (St Peter) Mount of the Crimean Mountains chain. Since 1987, a three kilometer Gondola lift, one of the longest in Europe and split into two stages, carries passengers to and from the mountain, providing visitors with excellent views of the surrounding area and the Black Sea.

== Demographics ==
Ethnic composition according to the 2001 Ukrainian census:

Ethnic groups in Alupka
	percent
Russians	64.79%
Ukrainians	27.19%
Belarusians	1.82%
Crimean Tatars	1.65%
Tatars	0.86%
Armenians	0.53%
Azerbaijanis	0.51%

== Notable people ==
- Amet-khan Sultan – Crimean Tatar flying ace and test pilot
- Alexander Khmelik – Russian film producer, screenwriter
- Evgeni Aldonin – Russian footballer
- Oleksandr Makarenko (1920-2003), Ukrainian historian
- Ihor Knyaz (born 1953), Ukrainian Admiral and commander of the Ukrainian Navy

== Gallery ==
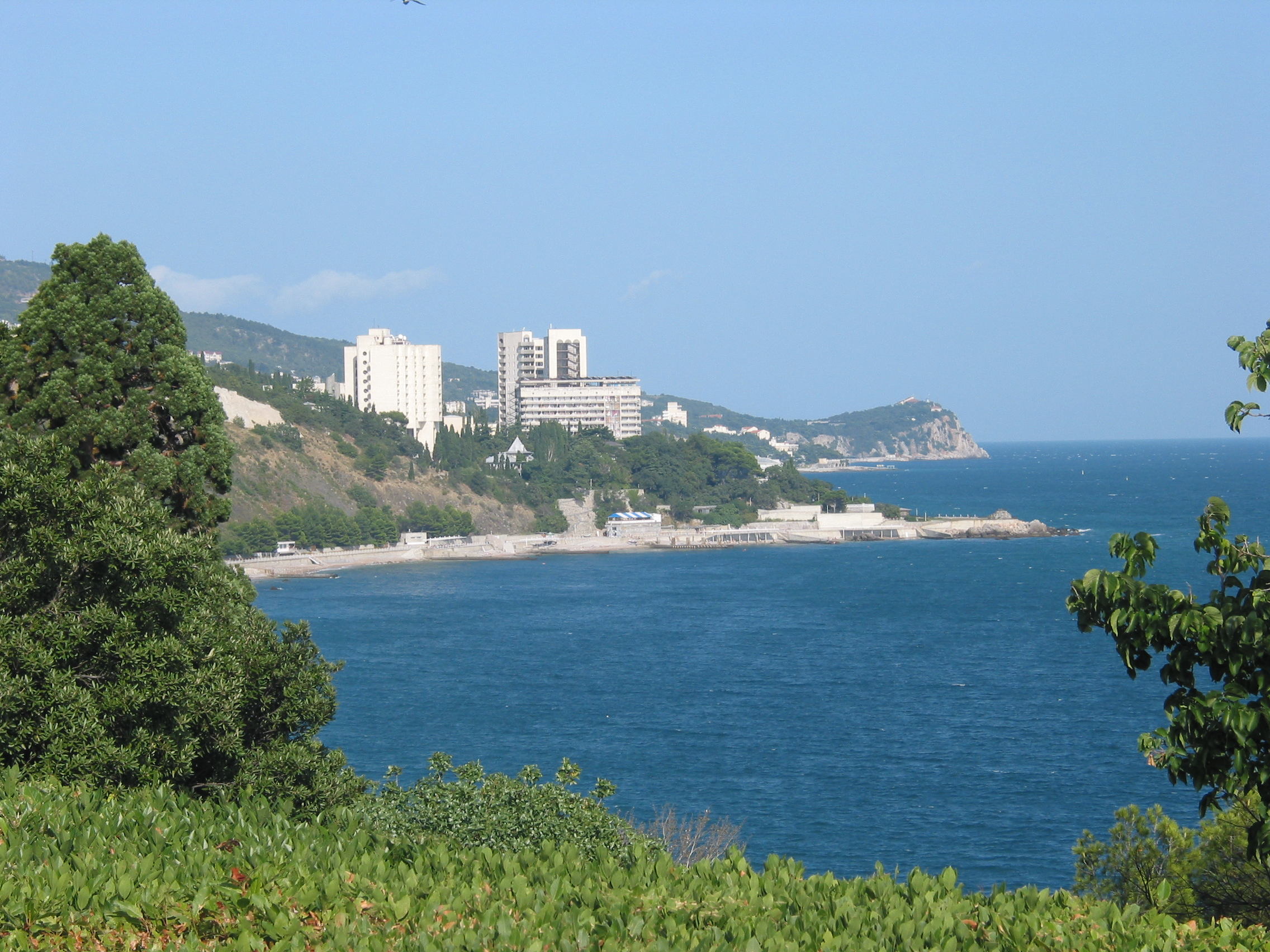
Alupka: coast

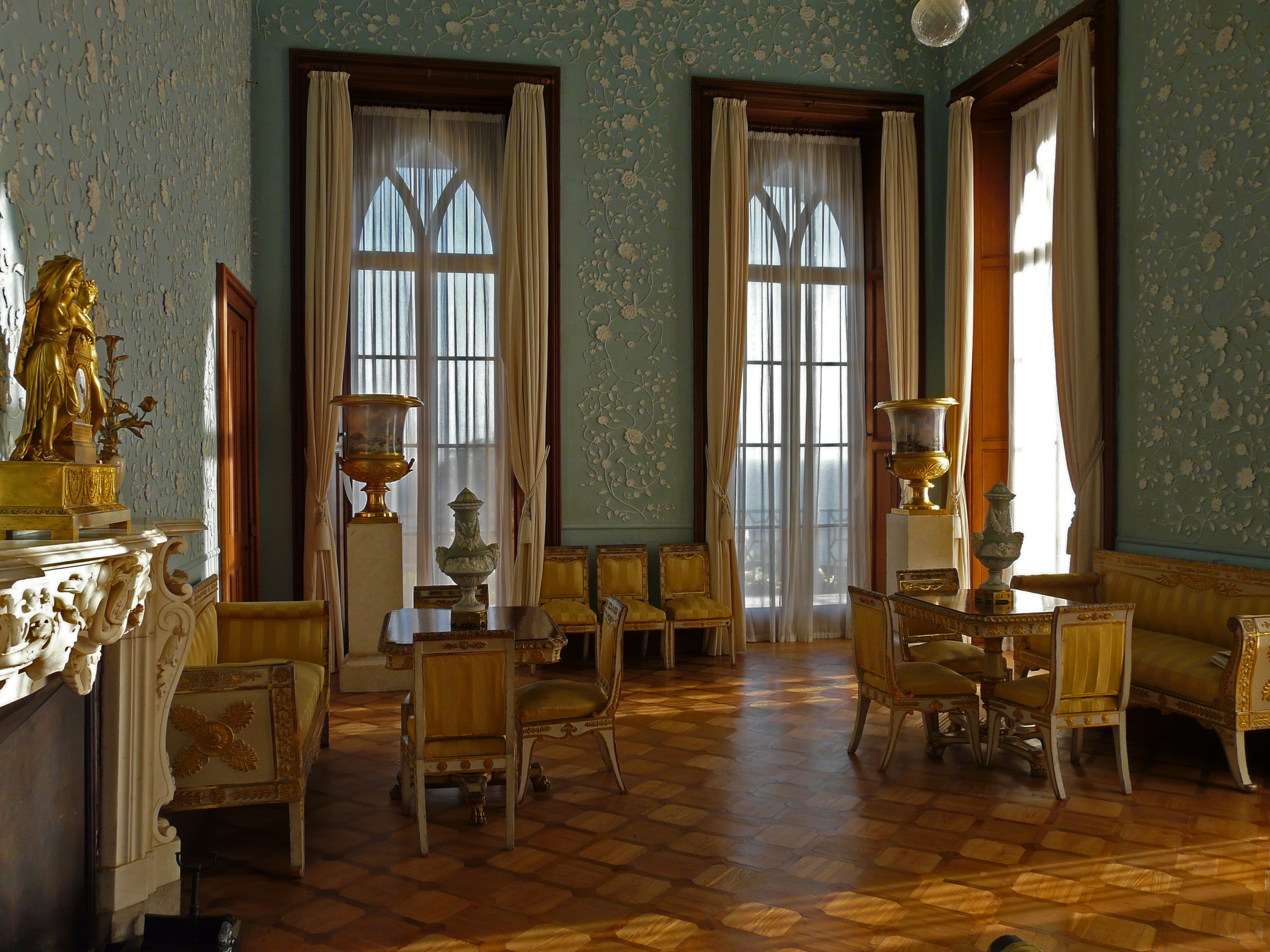
Alupka: A room of the Vorontsov Castle

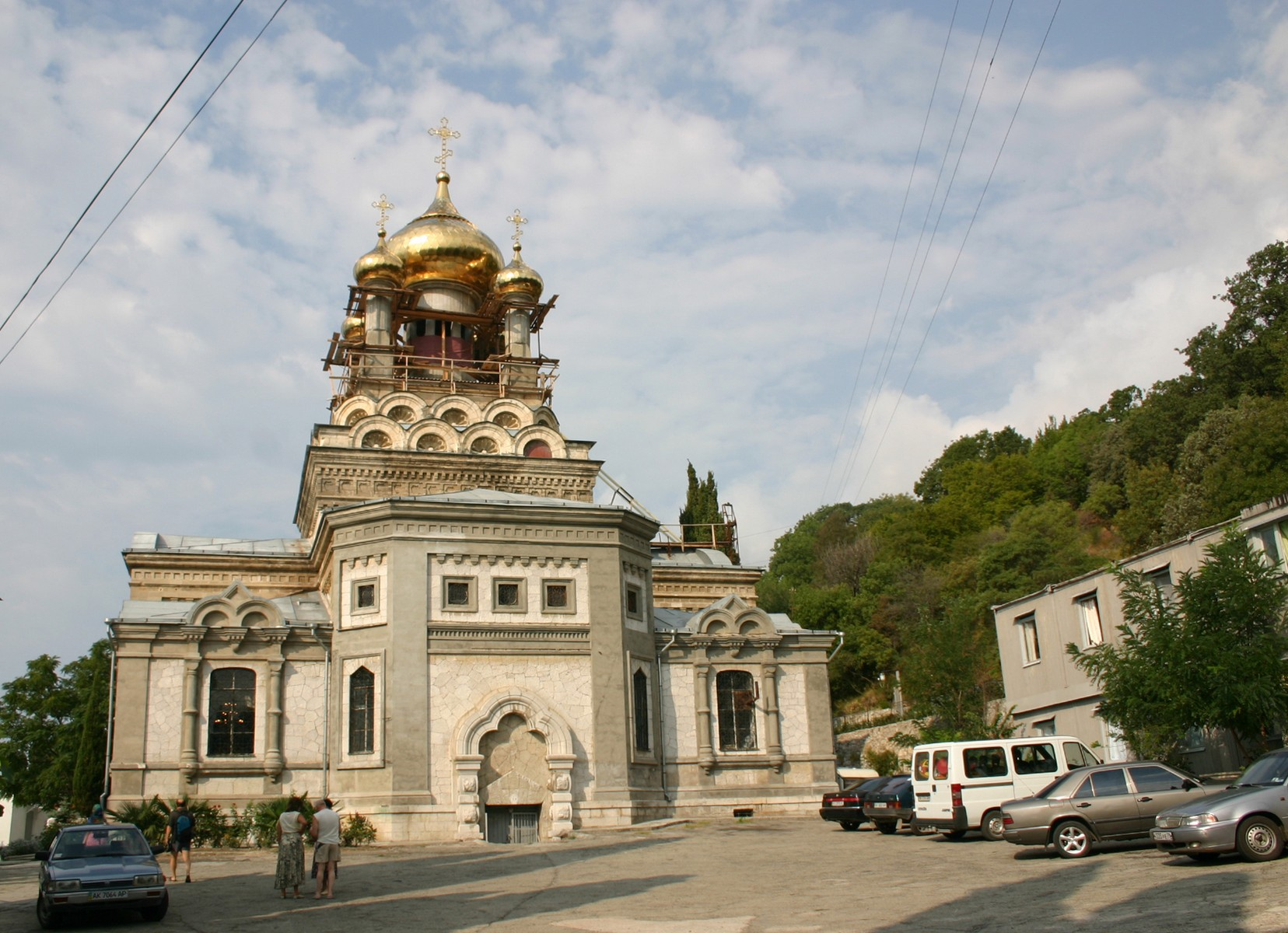
Saint Michael church in Alupka

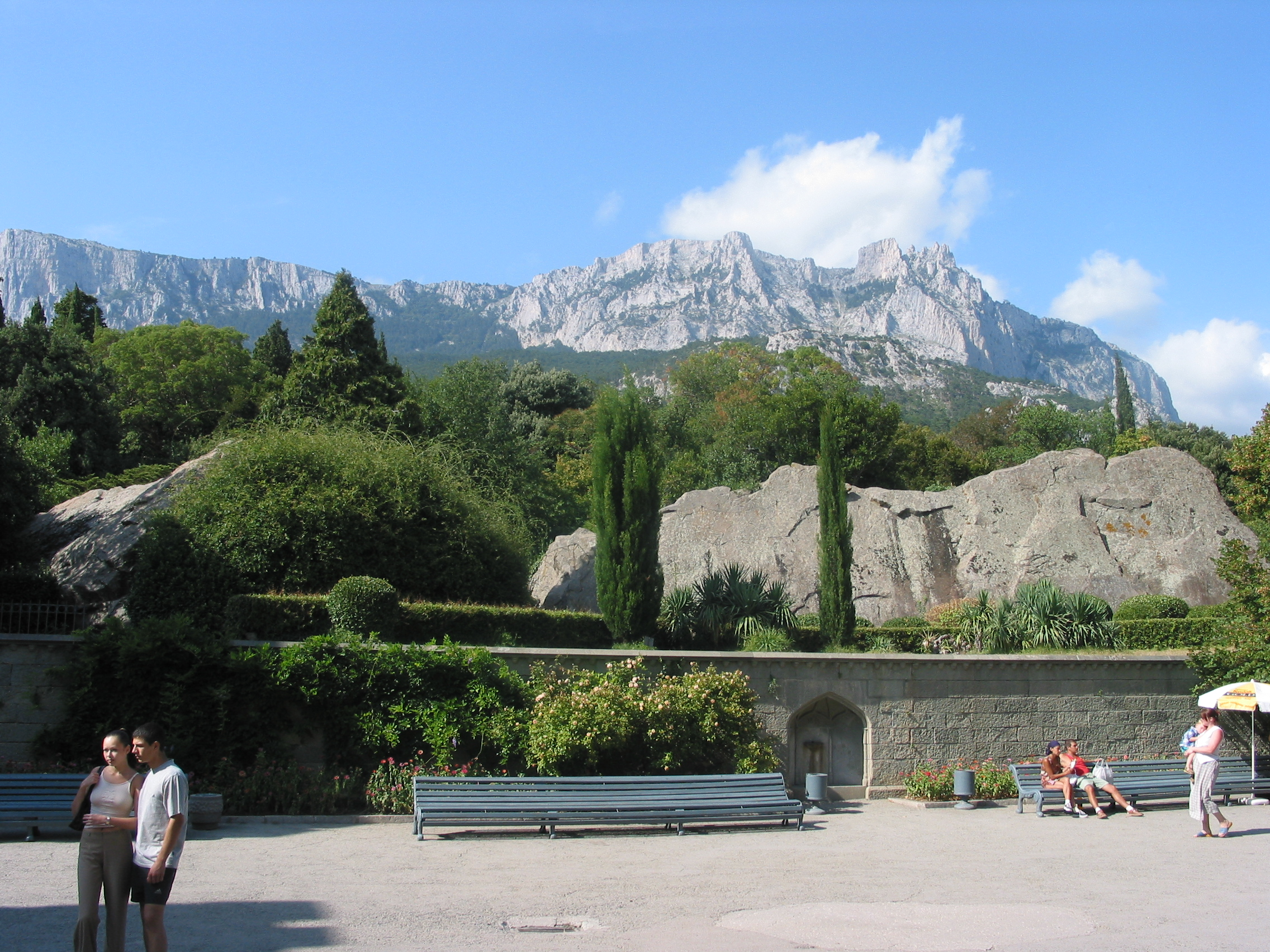
Alupkin Park

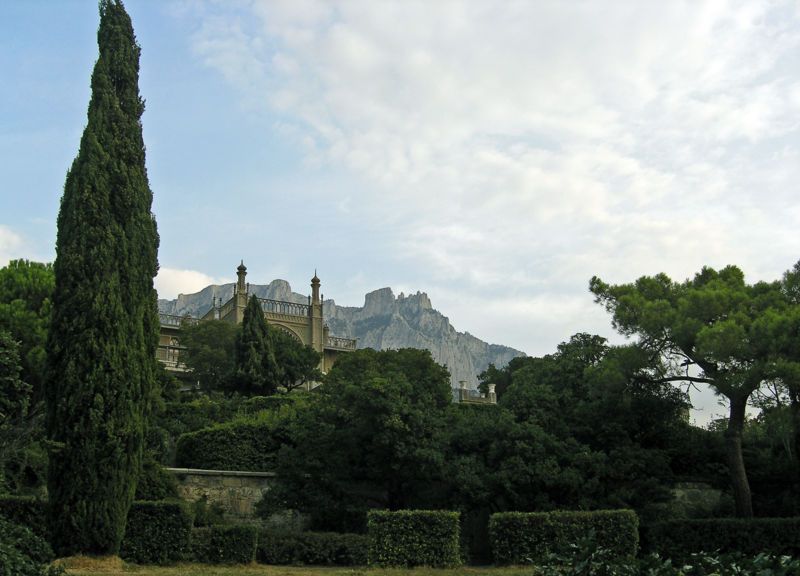
Vorontsov Palace (Alupka)

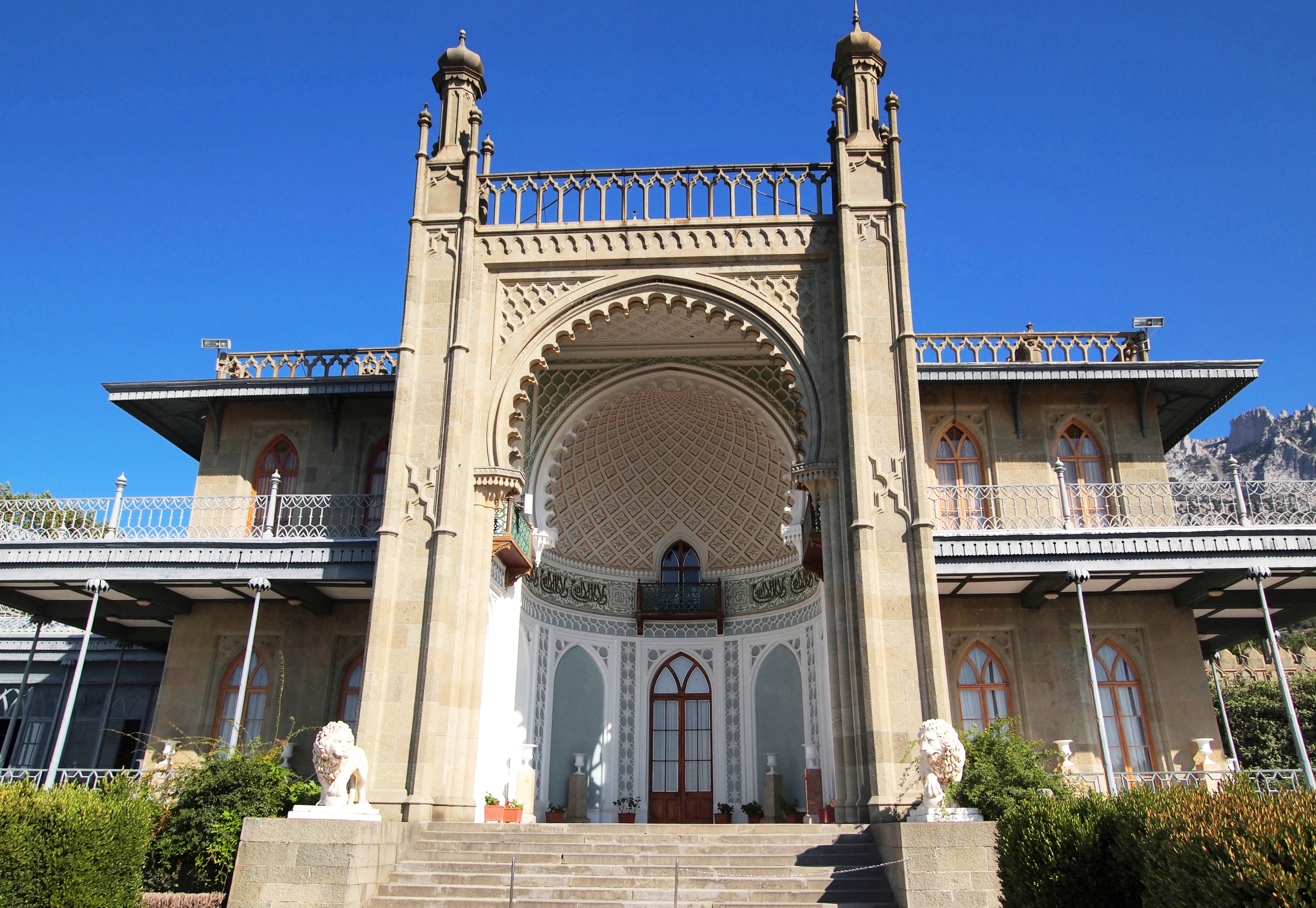
Alupka castle

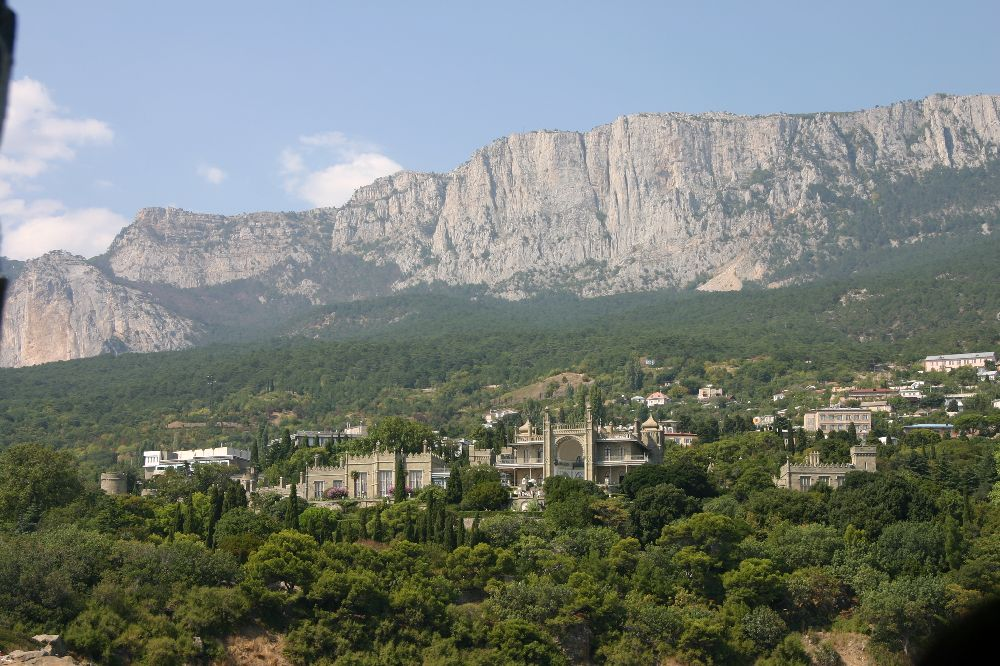
Vorontsovski castle

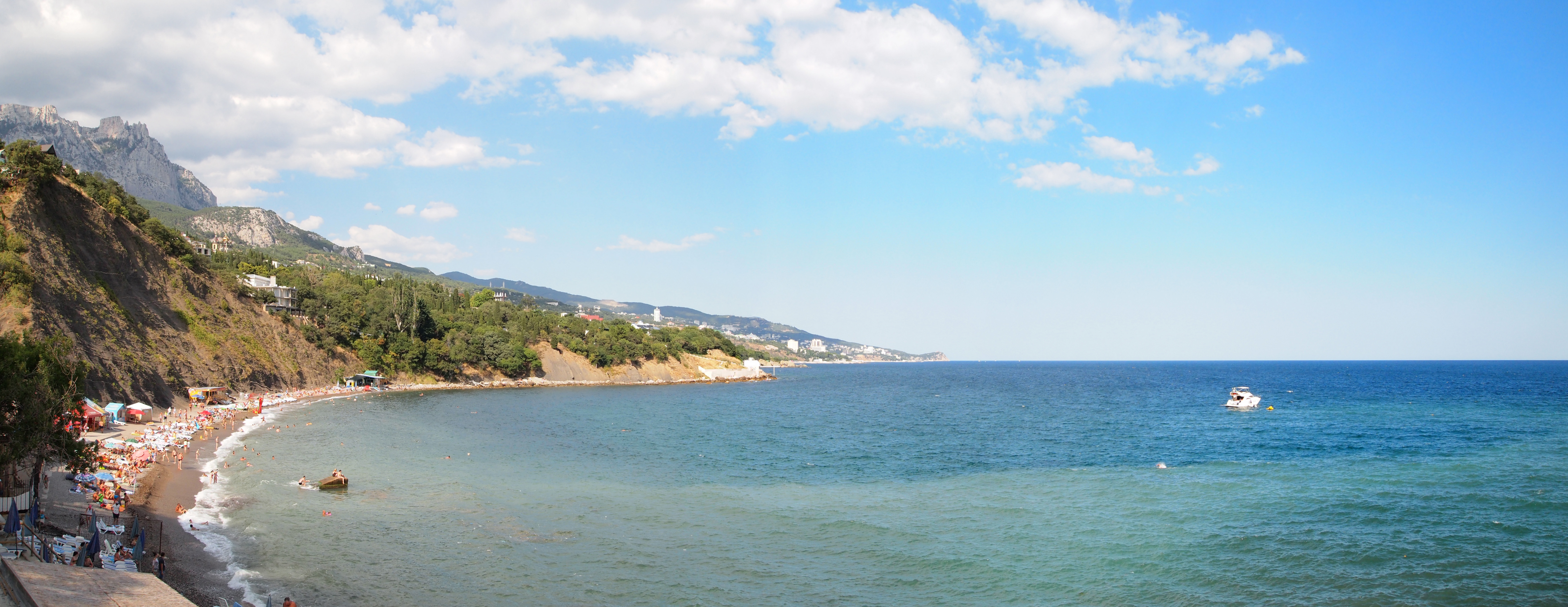
The Black Sea coast at Alupka
