= Sovietskyi Raion =

Coordinates: 45°20′49″N 34°56′00″E

Sovietskyi Raion Ichki Raion
- Raion
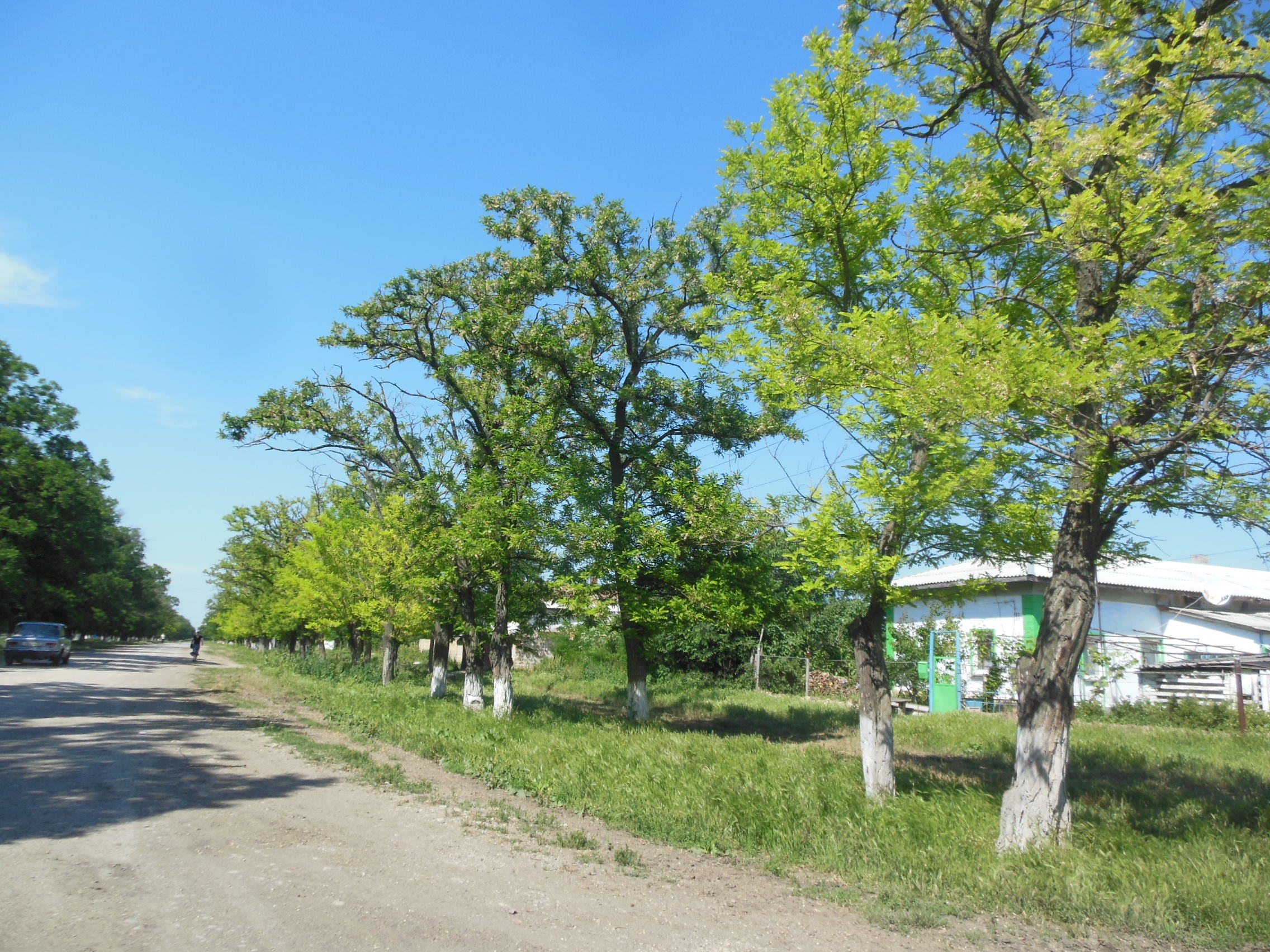
- Village (selo) Prudy, Sovetsky District

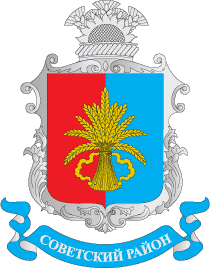
- Flag Seal
- Raion location within Crimea
- Country: Disputed: Ukraine (de jure); Russia (de facto)
- Republic: Crimea
- Capital: Sovietskyi
- Subdivisions: List: 0 cities; 1 towns; 36 villages

Area
  - Total: 1,080 km^{2} (420 sq mi)

Population (2014)
  - Total: 31,898
  - Density: 29.5/km^{2} (76.5/sq mi)
- Time zone: UTC+3 (MSK)
- Dialing code: +380-6551
- Website: sovmo.rk.gov.ru

Sovietskyi Raion (Russian: Советский район, Ukrainian: Совєтський район) or Ichki Raion (Ukrainian: Ічкінський район, Crimean Tatar: İçki rayonı) was one of the 25 regions of the Autonomous Republic of Crimea until its abolition in 2020. It continues to be used as an administration of Russia's Republic of Crimea, as it occupies the peninsula. The administrative center of the raion is the urban-type settlement of Sovietskyi, which is also known as Ichki. Population: 31,898 (2014 Census).

== History ==
=== 2020 Ukrainian administrative reform ===
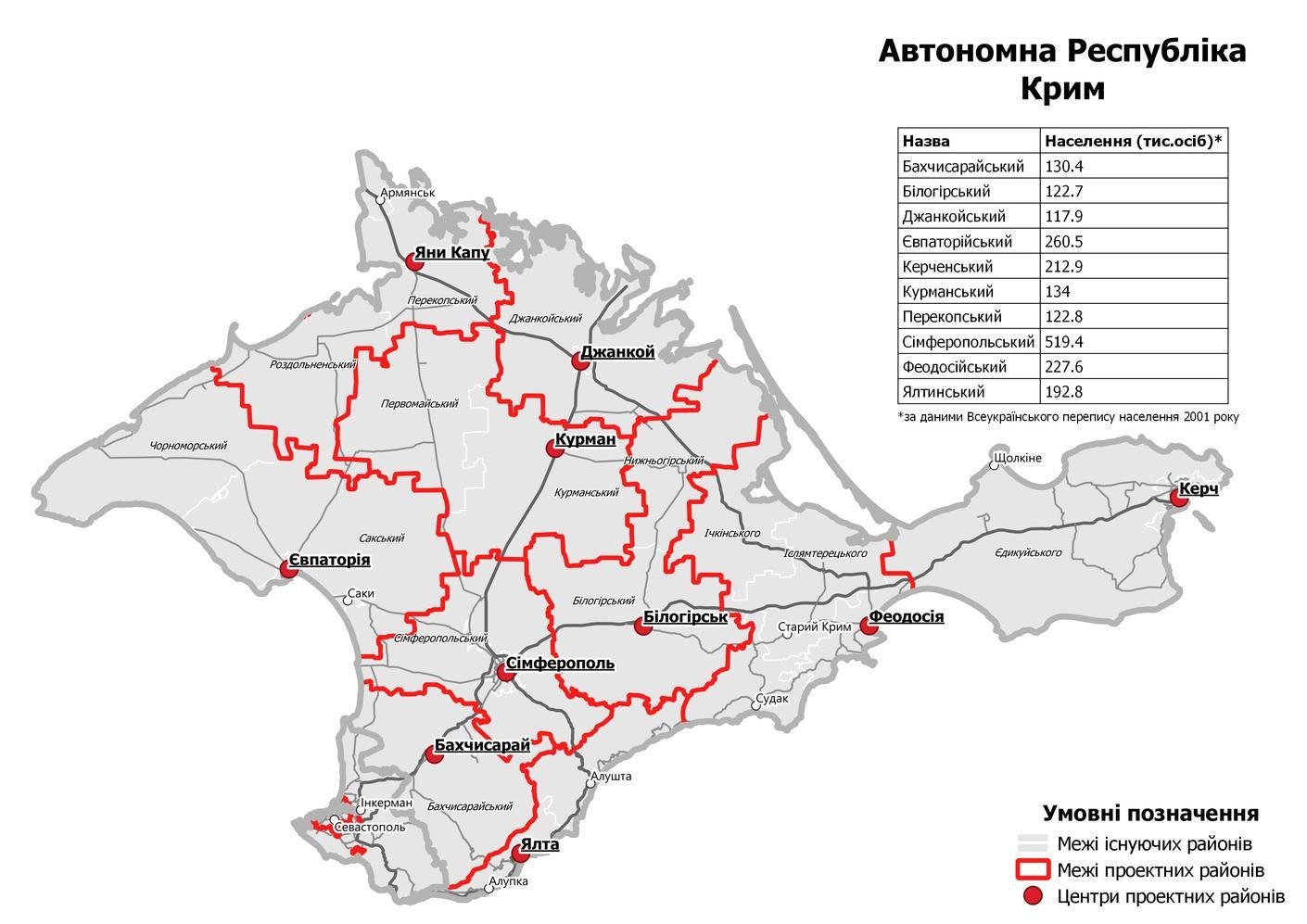
In July 2020, the Verkhovna Rada approved an administrative reform in Crimea

In July 2020, Ukraine conducted an administrative reform throughout its de jure territory. This included Crimea; among other changes, Ichki Raion was abolished, and its territories to become a part of Feodosia Raion. However, this has not yet been implemented due to the ongoing Russian occupation of Crimea.

== Demographics ==
As of the Ukrainian national census in 2001, the district had a population of 37,576 inhabitants. The ethnic makeup is diverse, with Russians constituting a solid plurality, while Ukrainians and Crimean Tatars make up large minorities. The ethnic composition was as follows:

Sovietskyi Raion
	percent
Russians	48.5%
Ukrainians	22.2%
Crimean Tatars	22.1%
Tatars	2.0%
Belarusians	1.3%
Mordvins	0.5%
Gypsies	0.4%
