= Kerch Raion =

District of Autonomous Republic of Crimea

Coordinates: 45.3619°N 36.4711°E

Kerch Raion Керченський район
- Raion
- Interactive map of Kerch Raion
- Country: Ukraine
- Autonomous Republic: Autonomous Republic of Crimea
- Established: 2023
- Admin. center: Kerch

The Kerch Raion, also transliterated as Kerchenskyi Raion, (Ukrainian: Керченський район) is a prospective raion (district) of the Autonomous Republic of Crimea in Ukraine. It was created on September 7, 2023, from the territories of Yedi Quyu Raion along with the Kerch Municipality. The administrative center is the city of Kerch.

Due to the ongoing Russian occupation of Crimea, the Ukrainian government only has de jure control over the peninsula, and this raion has not yet been implemented on the ground.

== See also ==
- Administrative divisions of Crimea
