= Yevpatoria Raion =

Administrative district in Yevpatoria, Crimea, Ukraine

Yevpatoria Raion Євпаторійський район
- Raion
- Interactive map of Yevpatoria Raion
- Country: Ukraine
- Autonomous Republic: Autonomous Republic of Crimea
- Established: 2023
- Admin. center: Yevpatoria

The Yevpatoria Raion, also transliterated as Yevpatoriiskyi Raion (Ukrainian: Євпаторійський район) is a prospective raion (district) of the Autonomous Republic of Crimea in Ukraine. It was created on September 7, 2023, from the territories of Saky Raion and Chornomorske Raion, along with the Yevpatoria and Saky municipalities. The administrative center is the city of Yevpatoria. Due to the ongoing Russian occupation of Crimea, the Ukrainian government has only de jure authority over the peninsula, and the raion has not yet been implemented in practice.

A previous Yevpatoria Raion existed from 1918 until 1963, when it was abolished, with part becoming the Yevpatoria Municipality and the rest going into Saky Raion.

== See also ==
- Administrative divisions of Crimea
