= Feodosia Raion =

Feodosia Raion Феодосійський район
- Raion
- Interactive map of Feodosia Raion
- Country: Ukraine
- Autonomous Republic: Autonomous Republic of Crimea
- Established: 2023
- Admin. center: Feodosia

The Feodosia Raion or Feodosiiskyi Raion (Ukrainian: Феодосійський район) is a prospective raion (district) of the Autonomous Republic of Crimea in Ukraine. It was created on September 7, 2023 from the territories of Isliam-Terek Raion and Ichki Raion. The administrative center is the city of Feodosia.

Due to the ongoing Russian occupation of Crimea, the Ukrainian government only has de jure control over the peninsula, and this raion has not yet been implemented on the ground.

== See also ==
- Administrative divisions of Crimea
