= Raions of Ukraine =

Second-level administrative divisions of Ukraine

- Category: Second-level subdivision
- Location: Ukraine
- Found in: Oblasts
- Created: 17 July 2020
- Number: 136 (as of 2023)
- Government: Raion council
- Subdivisions: 1469 hromadas

A raion (Ukrainian: район, romanized: raion; pl. райони, raiony), often translated as a district, is the second-level administrative division in Ukraine. The modern raion system originated from the 1923–1929 administrative reform in the Soviet Union, including the Ukrainian Soviet Socialist Republic, and has remained part of Ukraine's administrative structure since the country's independence in 1991. Raions replaced the previous system of volosts in 1923 and powiats in 1940.

On 17 July 2020, the Verkhovna Rada (Ukraine's parliament) approved an administrative reform that reduced the number of raions from 490 to 136 and incorporated the former "cities of regional significance" into the newly formed raions. Most tasks previously performed at the raion level, including education, healthcare, sports facilities, culture, and social welfare, were transferred to hromadas, the subdivisions of raions.

The 136 new districts include ten in Crimea, which has been under Russian control since 2014, although it remains internationally recognized as part of Ukraine.

== Terminology ==
Ukrainian	Ukrainian translit.	English
Район	Raion	District
Район у місті	Raion u misti	Urban district, district in a city

== Districts in a cities ==
Two cities of national significance (Kyiv and Sevastopol (Note: Sevastopol, a city with special status under Ukrainian law, was annexed by Russia in 2014.)) are divided into urban districts, also called districts in a city. Urban districts have their own local administration and are subordinated directly to city authorities.

== List ==
=== Number of raions by region ===
Region	Number of raions
Autonomous Republic of Crimea	10
Vinnytsia Oblast	6
Volyn Oblast	4
Dnipropetrovsk Oblast	7
Donetsk Oblast	8
Zhytomyr Oblast	4
Zakarpattia Oblast	6
Zaporizhzhia Oblast	5
Ivano-Frankivsk Oblast	6
Kyiv Oblast	7
Kirovohrad Oblast	4
Luhansk Oblast	8
Lviv Oblast	7
Mykolaiv Oblast	4
Odesa Oblast	7
Poltava Oblast	4
Rivne Oblast	4
Sumy Oblast	5
Ternopil Oblast	3
Kharkiv Oblast	7
Kherson Oblast	5
Khmelnytskyi Oblast	3
Cherkasy Oblast	4
Chernivtsi Oblast	3
Chernihiv Oblast	5
Ukraine	136

=== Oblasts ===
Raions located in the Russian-occupied territories of Ukraine.

Oblast	Name	Center	Center population	Area (km^{2})	Population (2021 estimate)	No. of Hromadas
Cherkasy Oblast	Cherkasy Raion	Cherkasy	274,8	6,882.1	591,313	26
Cherkasy Oblast	Uman Raion	Uman	83,1	4,527.2	251,408	12
Cherkasy Oblast	Zolotonosha Raion	Zolotonosha	28,3	4,249.1	138,036	11
Cherkasy Oblast	Zvenyhorodka Raion	Zvenyhorodka	17,1	5,279.9	197,509	17
Chernihiv Oblast	Chernihiv Raion	Chernihiv	288,3	10,249.0	451,430	20
Chernihiv Oblast	Nizhyn Raion	Nizhyn	71,1	7,226.6	220,640	17
Chernihiv Oblast	Pryluky Raion	Pryluky	56,3	5,214.2	152,632	11
Chernihiv Oblast	Novhorod-Siverskyi Raion	Novhorod-Siverskyi	13	4,630.5	63,670	4
Chernihiv Oblast	Koriukivka Raion	Koriukivka	12,9	4,578.7	88,329	5
Chernivtsi Oblast	Chernivtsi Raion	Chernivtsi	266,5	4,101.5	651,772	33
Chernivtsi Oblast	Dniester Raion	Kelmentsi	7,3	2,122.5	154,440	10
Chernivtsi Oblast	Vyzhnytsia Raion	Vyzhnytsia	4	1,882.0	90,354	9
Dnipropetrovsk Oblast	Dnipro Raion	Dnipro	987,2	5,605.7	1,159,302	17
Dnipropetrovsk Oblast	Kryvyi Rih Raion	Kryvyi Rih	624,6	5,717.4	755,667	15
Dnipropetrovsk Oblast	Kamianske Raion	Kamianske	240,5	4,821.2	430,066	12
Dnipropetrovsk Oblast	Nikopol Raion	Nikopol	110,7	3,240.4	255,505	8
Dnipropetrovsk Oblast	Pavlohrad Raion	Pavlohrad	105,2	2,420.9	169,509	7
Dnipropetrovsk Oblast	Samar Raion	Samar	71,4	3,482.9	169,275	8
Dnipropetrovsk Oblast	Synelnykove Raion	Synelnykove	31,4	6,616.6	202,711	19
Donetsk Oblast	Donetsk Raion	Donetsk	924,2	2,895.1	1,490,301	6
Donetsk Oblast	Mariupol Raion	Mariupol	440,4	2,623.8	510,425	5
Donetsk Oblast	Horlivka Raion	Horlivka	244	2,468.4	664,949	9
Donetsk Oblast	Kramatorsk Raion	Kramatorsk	153,9	5,186.3	553,559	12
Donetsk Oblast	Bakhmut Raion	Bakhmut	74,1	1,747.6	224,528	7
Donetsk Oblast	Pokrovsk Raion	Pokrovsk	63,0	4,020.0	393,487	14
Donetsk Oblast	Volnovakha Raion	Volnovakha	21,9	4,449.1	141,797	8
Donetsk Oblast	Kalmiuske Raion	Kalmiuske	11,5	3,132.6	121,234	5
Ivano-Frankivsk Oblast	Ivano-Frankivsk Raion	Ivano-Frankivsk	236,6	3,913.1	558,130	20
Ivano-Frankivsk Oblast	Kalush Raion	Kalush	66,5	3,555.0	282,692	13
Ivano-Frankivsk Oblast	Kolomyia Raion	Kolomyia	61,3	2,484.5	275,512	13
Ivano-Frankivsk Oblast	Nadvirna Raion	Nadvirna	22,1	1,872.0	129,939	8
Ivano-Frankivsk Oblast	Kosiv Raion	Kosiv	8,6	853.7	84,437	5
Ivano-Frankivsk Oblast	Verkhovyna Raion	Verkhovyna	5,8	1,271.7	30,399	3
Kharkiv Oblast	Kharkiv Raion	Kharkiv	1443,2	2,644.3	1,745,734	15
Kharkiv Oblast	Lozova Raion	Lozova	64,7	4,025.9	150,400	5
Kharkiv Oblast	Izium Raion	Izium	48,2	5,910.2	175,986	8
Kharkiv Oblast	Chuhuiv Raion	Chuhuiv	32,5	4,807.0	197,695	9
Kharkiv Oblast	Kupiansk Raion	Kupiansk	28,7	4,618.1	133,135	8
Kharkiv Oblast	Berestyn Raion	Berestyn	20,9	4,912.8	105,948	6
Kharkiv Oblast	Bohodukhiv Raion	Bohodukhiv	15,2	4,510.3	124,936	5
Kherson Oblast
Kherson Oblast	Kherson Raion	Kherson	289,1	3,649.9	456,548	10
Kherson Oblast	Kakhovka Raion	Nova Kakhovka	45,4	6,289.7	219,783	15
Kherson Oblast	Henichesk Raion	Henichesk	19,5	6,521.7	119,901	4
Kherson Oblast	Skadovsk Raion	Skadovsk	17,6	5,248.5	124,508	9
Kherson Oblast	Beryslav Raion	Beryslav	12,4	4,764.0	95,967	11
Khmelnytskyi Oblast	Khmelnytskyi Raion	Khmelnytskyi	273,9	10,755.8	679,374	27
Khmelnytskyi Oblast	Kamianets-Podilskyi Raion	Kamianets-Podilskyi	99	4,521.2	284,010	15
Khmelnytskyi Oblast	Shepetivka Raion	Shepetivka	41,2	5,346.7	280,403	18
Kirovohrad Oblast	Kropyvnytskyi Raion	Kropyvnytskyi	227,4	9,716.9	437,018	17
Kirovohrad Oblast	Oleksandriia Raion	Oleksandriia	79,3	5,409.7	223,451	9
Kirovohrad Oblast	Novoukrainka Raion	Novoukrainka	16,7	5,198.9	138,509	13
Kirovohrad Oblast	Holovanivsk Raion	Holovanivsk	6	4,244.3	121,150	10
Kyiv Oblast	Bila Tserkva Raion	Bila Tserkva	208,9	6,513.1	436,115	13
Kyiv Oblast	Brovary Raion	Brovary	108,7	2,883.1	242,180	8
Kyiv Oblast	Boryspil Raion	Boryspil	62,3	3,874.9	203,273	11
Kyiv Oblast	Fastiv Raion	Fastiv	45,9	2,886.7	183,794	9
Kyiv Oblast	Bucha Raion	Bucha	35,6	1,544.3	362,382	12
Kyiv Oblast	Obukhiv Raion	Obukhiv	33,6	3,526.3	228,829	9
Kyiv Oblast	Vyshhorod Raion	Vyshhorod	29,9	6,913.4	131,957	7
Luhansk Oblast	Luhansk Raion	Luhansk	403,9	2,147.4	529,716	3
Luhansk Oblast	Alchevsk Raion	Alchevsk	107,4	2,006.1	437,513	3
Luhansk Oblast	Siverskodonetsk Raion	Siverskodonetsk	102,4	2,685.7	369,421	6
Luhansk Oblast	Dovzhansk Raion	Dovzhansk	64,2	2,139.0	206,360	2
Luhansk Oblast	Rovenky Raion	Rovenky	46,7	2,087.6	295,057	3
Luhansk Oblast	Svatove Raion	Svatove	17,1	5,329.1	78,278	7
Luhansk Oblast	Starobilsk Raion	Starobilsk	16,9	6,930.6	126,010	8
Luhansk Oblast	Shchastia Raion	Novoaidar	8,6	3,380.4	78,967	5
Lviv Oblast	Lviv Raion	Lviv	724,3	4,968.5	1,146,538	23
Lviv Oblast	Drohobych Raion	Drohobych	76	1,496.9	235,405	5
Lviv Oblast	Sheptytskyi Raion	Sheptytskyi	67,2	2,971.6	228,945	7
Lviv Oblast	Stryi Raion	Stryi	59,3	3,840.5	322,853	14
Lviv Oblast	Sambir Raion	Sambir	34,8	3,250.4	224,126	11
Lviv Oblast	Zolochiv Raion	Zolochiv	24,3	2,913.4	160,664	7
Lviv Oblast	Yavoriv Raion	Yavoriv	15	2,378.4	179,219	6
Mykolaiv Oblast	Mykolaiv Raion	Mykolaiv	483,2	7,433.7	645,562	19
Mykolaiv Oblast	Pervomaisk Raion	Pervomaisk	66,1	3,797.2	147,757	8
Mykolaiv Oblast	Voznesensk Raion	Voznesensk	34,4	6,081.0	178,336	13
Mykolaiv Oblast	Bashtanka Raion	Bashtanka	12,7	6,714.9	136,739	12
Odesa Oblast	Odesa Raion	Odesa	1017,7	3,922.8	1,382,541	22
Odesa Oblast	Izmail Raion	Izmail	71,8	3,434.4	207,333	6
Odesa Oblast	Bilhorod-Dnistrovskyi Raion	Bilhorod-Dnistrovskyi	49	5,220.6	198,572	16
Odesa Oblast	Podilsk Raion	Podilsk	40,4	7,063.6	224,163	12
Odesa Oblast	Rozdilna Raion	Rozdilna	17,8	3,564.4	102,584	9
Odesa Oblast	Bolhrad Raion	Bolhrad	15	4,559.4	146,424	10
Odesa Oblast	Berezivka Raion	Berezivka	9,6	5,551.6	106,490	16
Poltava Oblast	Poltava Raion	Poltava	286,7	10,849.6	589,922	24
Poltava Oblast	Kremenchuk Raion	Kremenchuk	220,1	6,105.8	392,341	12
Poltava Oblast	Lubny Raion	Lubny	46,2	5,476.9	187,538	7
Poltava Oblast	Myrhorod Raion	Myrhorod	39,1	6,287.4	201,728	17
Rivne Oblast	Rivne Raion	Rivne	245,6	7,218.0	629,531	26
Rivne Oblast	Varash Raion	Varash	42,4	3,327.2	138,599	8
Rivne Oblast	Dubno Raion	Dubno	38	3,294.6	167,728	19
Rivne Oblast	Sarny Raion	Sarny	29,2	6,219.0	212,598	11
Sumy Oblast	Sumy Raion	Sumy	263,5	6,499.4	440,618	16
Sumy Oblast	Konotop Raion	Konotop	86,3	5,190.6	198,238	8
Sumy Oblast	Shostka Raion	Shostka	75	5,072.3	182,792	10
Sumy Oblast	Okhtyrka Raion	Okhtyrka	48,5	3,196.6	122,146	9
Sumy Oblast	Romny Raion	Romny	40,5	3,882.7	109,658	8
Ternopil Oblast	Ternopil Raion	Ternopil	221,8	6,162.3	562,142	25
Ternopil Oblast	Chortkiv Raion	Chortkiv	29	5,022.0	326,745	22
Ternopil Oblast	Kremenets Raion	Kremenets	21,2	2,635.7	141,675	8
Vinnytsia Oblast	Vinnytsia Raion	Vinnytsia	370,7	6,888.9	652,126	16
Vinnytsia Oblast	Zhmerynka Raion	Zhmerynka	34,3	3,150.6	161,544	8
Vinnytsia Oblast	Mohyliv-Podilskyi Raion	Mohyliv-Podilskyi	31,2	3,220.5	142,456	7
Vinnytsia Oblast	Khmilnyk Raion	Khmilnyk	27,4	3,701.1	183,913	9
Vinnytsia Oblast	Haisyn Raion	Haisyn	25,8	5,674.8	236,803	14
Vinnytsia Oblast	Tulchyn Raion	Tulchyn	14,9	3,858.4	152,281	9
Volyn Oblast	Lutsk Raion	Lutsk	221,1	5,247.8	456,928	15
Volyn Oblast	Kovel Raion	Kovel	68,2	7,647.9	268,082	23
Volyn Oblast	Volodymyr Raion	Volodymyr	38,9	2,558.2	171,264	11
Volyn Oblast	Kamin-Kashyrskyi Raion	Kamin-Kashyrskyi	12,5	4,693.4	131,123	5
Zakarpattia Oblast	Uzhhorod Raion	Uzhhorod	114,9	2,359.5	255,532	14
Zakarpattia Oblast	Mukachevo Raion	Mukachevo	85,9	2,054.0	252,616	13
Zakarpattia Oblast	Khust Raion	Khust	28,5	3,174.4	267,333	13
Zakarpattia Oblast	Berehove Raion	Berehove	23,7	1,458.7	207,719	10
Zakarpattia Oblast	Rakhiv Raion	Rakhiv	15,5	1,845.2	82,397	4
Zakarpattia Oblast	Tiachiv Raion	Tiachiv	9	1,869.5	184,532	10
Zaporizhzhia Oblast
Zaporizhzhia Oblast	Zaporizhzhia Raion	Zaporizhzhia	731,9	4,674.6	855,297	17
Zaporizhzhia Oblast	Melitopol Raion	Melitopol	153,1	7,081.0	280,816	16
Zaporizhzhia Oblast	Berdiansk Raion	Berdiansk	109,2	4,461.6	179,118	8
Zaporizhzhia Oblast	Polohy Raion	Polohy	19,3	6,762.5	167,060	15
Zaporizhzhia Oblast	Vasylivka Raion	Vasylivka	13,7	4,287.3	184,224	11
Zhytomyr Oblast	Zhytomyr Raion	Zhytomyr	264,5	10,505.8	613,311	31
Zhytomyr Oblast	Berdychiv Raion	Berdychiv	75,4	3,014.1	159,164	10
Zhytomyr Oblast	Korosten Raion	Korosten	63,3	11,066.8	255,480	13
Zhytomyr Oblast	Zviahel Raion	Zviahel	56,3	5,242.6	167,540	12

Changes

As a result of decommunization and derussification efforts, many toponyms have been renamed, including some raions.

- Novomoskovsk Raion → Samar Raion
- Krasnohrad Raion → Berestyn Raion
- Severodonetsk Raion → Siverskodonetsk Raion
- Chervonohrad Raion → Sheptytskyi Raion
- Novohrad-Volynskyi Raion → Zviahel Raion

=== Autonomous Republic of Crimea ===
In 2014, the Autonomous Republic of Crimea was annexed by Russia as the Republic of Crimea.

The populations in the table are from the census of 2001.

#	Name	Center	Year	Area (km^{2})	Population	Density	Councils (municipalities)		
#	Name	Center	Year	Area (km^{2})	Population	Density	City	Town	Village
1	Bakhchysarai Raion	Bakhchysarai	2023	1,589	92,617	58	1	2	15
2	Bilohirsk Raion	Bilohirsk	2023	3,106	122,259	39	1	2	35
3	Dzhankoi Raion	Dzhankoi	2023	2,693	125,333	47	1	2	26
4	Feodosia Raion	Feodosia	2023	3,177	231,666	73	3	8	47
5	Kerch Raion	Kerch	2023	3,027	226,660	75	2	2	24
6	Perekop Raion	Yany Kapu	2023	2,646	126,110	48	2	2	25
7	Kurman Raion	Kurman	2023	3,240	134,035	41	0	3	34
8	Simferopol Raion	Simferopol	2023	1,860	512,527	276	1	8	19
9	Yalta Raion	Yalta	2023	883	198,161	224	3	22	33
10	Yevpatoria Raion	Yevpatoria	2023	3,860	264,368	68	3	5	33

== See also ==
- Administrative divisions of Ukraine
- Oblasts of Ukraine
- Hromada
- Povit
