= Autonomous republic of Ukraine =

Administrative division of Ukraine

- Category: First-level subdivision of a unitary state
- Location: Ukraine
- Created: 24 April 1992
- Number: 1
- Government: Verkhovna Rada of Crimea

Ukraine is administratively divided into 24 oblasts and the Autonomous Republic of Crimea, which has a special autonomous status under the Constitution of Ukraine. Chapter X of the Constitution defines the legal status of the Autonomous Republic of Crimea, and its governance is regulated by laws adopted by Ukraine's parliament, the Verkhovna Rada.

In 2014, Russia occupied and subsequently annexed Crimea, incorporating it as the Republic of Crimea. However, Ukraine continues to regard Crimea as an integral part of its territory, and the annexation has not been recognized by the vast majority of the international community.

In 2016, the United Nations General Assembly reaffirmed its non-recognition of the annexation and adopted a resolution condemning "the temporary occupation of part of the territory of Ukraine—the Autonomous Republic of Crimea and the city of Sevastopol", while reaffirming Ukraine's sovereignty and territorial integrity.

== List of republics ==
ISO code	Name	Flag	Coat of arms	Status	Capital	Area (sq mi)	Population
UA-43	Autonomous Republic of Crimea	(Autonomous Republic of Crimea)	Coat of arms of Crimea	Autonomous republic	Simferopol	10,038	1,911,818
