= Monuments of national significance in the Autonomous Republic of Crimea =

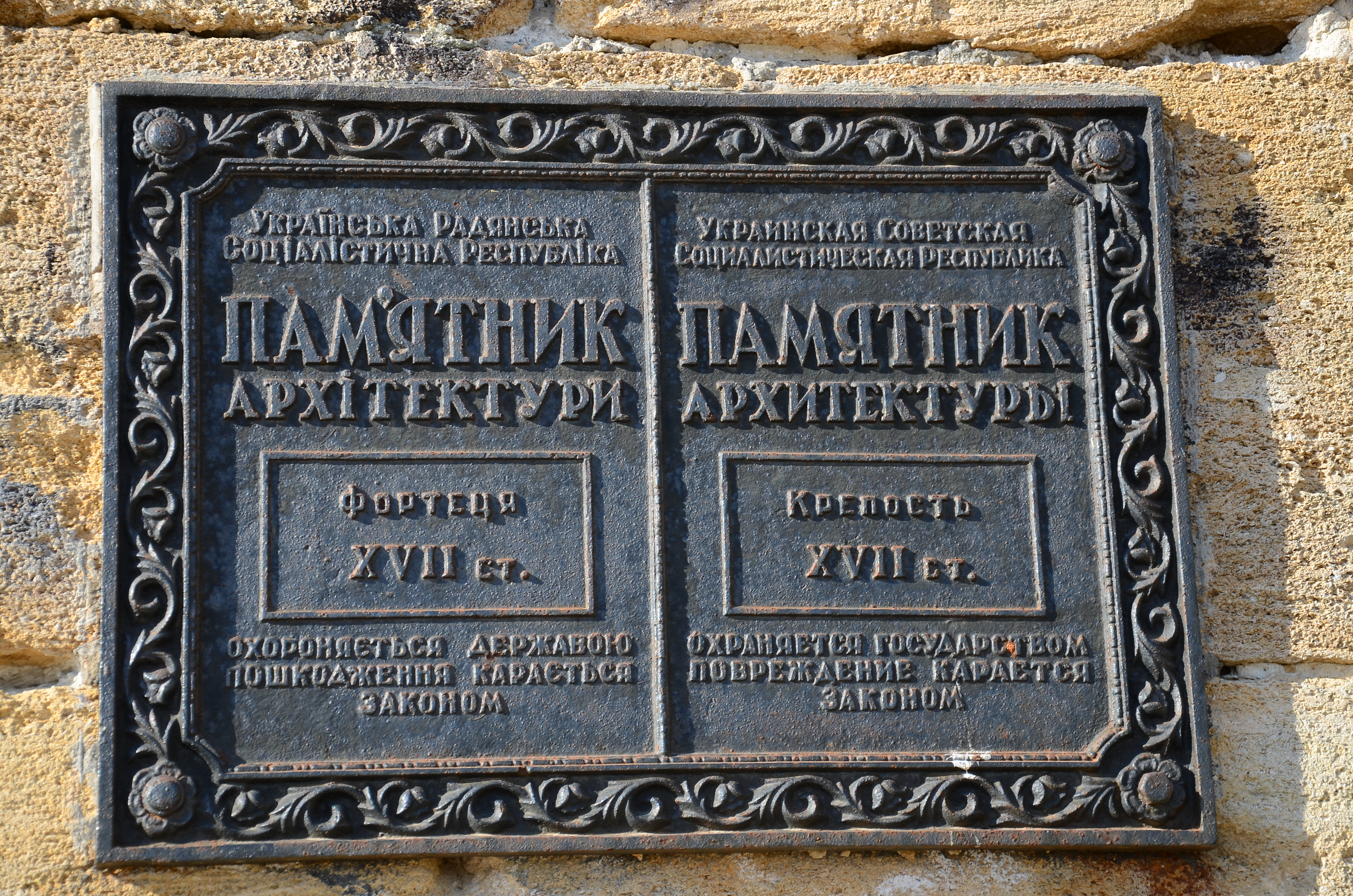
Bilingual Soviet-era cultural heritage plaque of the Yeni-Kale Fortress in Kerch

The State Register of Immovable Monuments of Ukraine classifies cultural heritage monuments as either of local or national significance. (Note: 'Monuments of national significance' may also be translated as 'monuments of national importance'; Ukrainian: пам'ятки національного значення) To be classified as nationally significant, a monument must have had a substantial impact on the country's culture, been associated with major historical events or individuals who shaped national culture, represented a masterpiece of creative genius, or embodied a disappeared civilisation or disappeared artistic style. Monuments of national significance are inscribed on the register by the Cabinet of Ministers, and are protected and maintained by the Ministry of Culture. All listed monuments belong to at least one of the following categories: archaeology, history, monumental art, architecture, urban planning, garden and park art, landscape, or science and technology. (Note: The categories are defined as such: Archaeological monuments are underground or underwater remains of human activity that bear testimony to the origin or development of civilisation.; Historic monuments are buildings, structures, burials, and other sites associated with important historical events or the lives and activities of prominent individuals.; Monuments of monumental art are works of fine art.; Architectural monuments are buildings and structures that retain full or partial authenticity and express characteristics of a particular culture, era, style, construction technique, or represent works of renowned architects.; Urban planning monuments are historic neighbourhoods, streets, squares, or ensembles with preserved spatial layouts and architectural integrity.; Monuments of garden and park art combine park construction with natural or anthropogenic landscapes.; Landscape monuments are natural areas possessing historical value.; Monuments of science and technology are industrial, engineering, or scientific sites that reflect the scientific and technological development of an era or discipline.)

The first attempts to establish registers of protected buildings were undertaken in 1917 and 1918 by the Ukrainian People's Republic. These efforts continued in the 1920s in Soviet Ukraine, culminating in the listing of thousands of monuments, but were halted in the 1930s with the dissolution of relevant institutions and the active destruction of cultural—particularly religious—heritage. The listing of cultural heritage monuments in the region was renewed in 1956. A list of architectural monuments was approved in 1963, followed by a separate list of artistic, historic, and archaeological monuments in 1965. Both lists remained in use after Ukraine declared independence in 1991. On 8 June 2000, the State Register of Immovable Monuments was established with the adoption of the law On the Protection of Cultural Heritage. All entries from the Soviet-era list of artistic, historic, and archaeological monuments were transferred to the new register on 14 September 2009. The transfer of monuments from the Soviet architectural register, however, has proceeded more slowly and remains incomplete as of 2026, although the process has accelerated in recent years. At the same time, a number of sites have been deprived of their protected status to comply with decommunisation and derussification laws in effect since 2015 and 2023, respectively.

Since Russia's occupation and internationally unrecognised annexation of the peninsula in 2014, the Autonomous Republic of Crimea and the city with special status of Sevastopol have been disputed, with most countries recognising the territory as de jure part of Ukraine while de facto it remains under Russian control. On 21 May 2014, the Russian-governed Republic of Crimea declared all Crimean monuments listed on Ukrainian registers to be protected under Russian law. They were subsequently reclassified according to the Russian system, which divides monuments into those of federal, regional, and local (municipal) significance.

The Autonomous Republic of Crimea contains 224 monuments of national significance. (Note: No monuments of national significance in the autonomous republic remain on the Soviet-era register.) It is divided into ten raions (districts), (Note: This division has been de jure in place since an administrative reform in 2023, but is not de facto used as it is unrecognised by the Russian authorities. As part of the reform, parts of Sevastopol—a city with special status—have been incorporated into Bakhchysarai Raion. However, this change is not reflected in Ukraine's State Register of Immovable Monuments as of April 2026 (with the exception of three monuments: Baidar Gate, Shuldan Monastery, and Chylter-Marmara Monastery). The sites located within pre-2023 Sevastopol areas are included in the list of monuments in Sevastopol instead.) seven of which—Bakhchysarai, Bilohirsk, Feodosia, Kerch, Simferopol, Yalta, and Yevpatoria—contain 52, 6, 65, 22, 11, 58, and 10 monuments of national significance, respectively. Dzhankoi, Kurman, and Perekop raions have no national monuments. Of the total, 187 are classified as architectural monuments, 27 as historic, 22 as archaeological, 12 as urban planning, 11 as monumental art, and 1 as science and technology, with 24 monuments belonging to multiple categories. The architectural monuments date from the 4th century BCE to the early 20th century CE. The latest additions date to May 2020. One monument—Livadiia Palace—is listed twice.

== Bakhchysarai Raion ==
Monuments of national significance in Bakhchysarai Raion
Name (Note: The names listed are unofficial translations as the register is only available in Ukrainian. The official Ukrainian names are shown below each translation, with links to the corresponding Ukrainian Wikipedia articles if applicable.)	Location	Date constructed (Note: Datings of the monuments as indicated on the register)	Date designated (Note: For monuments previously listed on a Soviet-era register, the date of transfer to the modern register is indicated.)	Type	Protection number (Note: Every monument is assigned a unique protection number, and those of national significance located in the Autonomous Republic of Crimea start with the digits 01.)	Photo	Ref.
Complex of the Dormition Cave Monastery Комплекс Успенського печерного монастиря	Bakhchysarai	5th–9th centuries, 9th–13th centuries, 14th–17th centuries	14 September 2009	Archaeological	010006-Н		
Complex of the Khan's Palace Комплекс Ханського палацу	Bakhchysarai	16th–19th centuries	2 July 2020	Architectural	010077	More images	
Main building Головний корпус	Bakhchysarai	Early 16th–18th centuries	2 July 2020	Architectural	010077/1	More images	
Harem Гарем	Bakhchysarai	18th century	2 July 2020	Architectural	010077/2	More images	
Count's (suite) building Графський (світський) корпус	Bakhchysarai	Early 16th–18th centuries	2 July 2020	Architectural	010077/3	More images	
Khan's kitchen Ханська кухня	Bakhchysarai	— (Note: Not dated on the register)	2 July 2020	Architectural	010077/4	More images	
Stable building Стайневий корпус	Bakhchysarai	16th–18th centuries	2 July 2020	Architectural	010077/5	More images	
Library building Бібліотечний корпус	Bakhchysarai	19th century	2 July 2020	Architectural	010077/6	More images	
Falcon tower Соколина башта	Bakhchysarai	18th century	2 July 2020	Architectural	010077/7	More images	
Khan's Mosque Ханська мечеть	Bakhchysarai	1740–1743	2 July 2020	Architectural	010077/8	More images	
Tomb "Dürbe of Dilâra Bikeç" Гробниця "Дюрбе Диляра-Бикеч"	Bakhchysarai	1764	2 July 2020	Architectural	010077/9	More images	
Bathhouse "Sarı Güzel" Баня "Сари-Гюзель"	Bakhchysarai	1533	2 July 2020	Architectural	010077/10	More images	
Tomb "Northern Dürbe" Гробниця "Північне Дюрбе"	Bakhchysarai	16th century	2 July 2020	Architectural	010077/11	More images	
Tomb "Southern Dürbe" Гробниця "Південне Дюрбе"	Bakhchysarai	17th century	2 July 2020	Architectural	010077/12	More images	
Tomb rotunda Надгробна ротонда	Bakhchysarai	18th century	2 July 2020	Architectural	010077/13	More images	
Embankment with three bridges Набережна з трьома мостами	Bakhchysarai	16th century	2 July 2020	Architectural	010077/14	More images	
Gardens and park structures Сади і паркові споруди	Bakhchysarai	16th–18th centuries	2 July 2020	Architectural	010077/15	More images	
Catherine's mile Катерининська миля	Bakhchysarai	1787	2 July 2020	Architectural	010077/16	More images	
Tomb "Eski Dürbe" Гробниця "Ескі Дюрбе"	Bakhchysarai	14th century	2 July 2020	Architectural	010078	More images	
Tomb "Dürbe of Hacı Geray" Гробниця "Дюрбе Хаджи Гірея"	Bakhchysarai	1501	2 July 2020	Architectural	010079	More images	
School "Zıncırlı medrese" Школа "Зинджирли медресе"	Bakhchysarai	1500	2 July 2020	Architectural	010080	More images	
Cave Dormition Monastery Печерний Успенський монастир	Bakhchysarai	5th–18th centuries	2 July 2020	Architectural	010081	More images	
Dormition Church Успенська церква	Bakhchysarai	15th century	2 July 2020	Architectural	010081/1	More images	
Bell tower Дзвіниця	Bakhchysarai	18th century	2 July 2020	Architectural	010081/2	More images	
Hegumen's house Настоятельський будинок	Bakhchysarai	18th century	2 July 2020	Architectural	010081/3	More images	
Fortress and cave town "Chufut-Kale" Фортеця і печерне місто "Чуфут-Кале"	Bakhchysarai	5th–18th centuries	2 July 2020	Architectural	010082	More images	
Fortress walls with a gate and a tower Мури фортеці з брамою та баштою	Bakhchysarai	5th–6th centuries	2 July 2020	Architectural	010082/1	More images	
Eastern fortress wall with the great gate Східний мур фортеці з великою брамою	Bakhchysarai	13th–14th centuries	2 July 2020	Architectural	010082/2	More images	
Fortress wall with the small gate Мур фортеці з малою брамою	Bakhchysarai	13th–14th centuries	2 July 2020	Architectural	010082/3	More images	
Tomb "Dürbe of Canike Hanım" Гробниця "Дюрбе Джаніке Ханим"	Bakhchysarai	1437	2 July 2020	Architectural	010082/4	More images	
Karaite kenasa (big) Караїмська кенаса (велика)	Bakhchysarai	14th century	2 July 2020	Architectural	010082/5	More images	
Karaite kenasa (small) Караїмська кенаса (мала)	Bakhchysarai	18th century	2 July 2020	Architectural	010082/6	More images	
Residential building Жилий будинок	Bakhchysarai	18th century	2 July 2020	Architectural	010082/7	More images	
Tahtalı Cami Mosque Мечеть Тахтали Джамі	Bakhchysarai	1707	2 July 2020	Architectural	010083	More images	
Tomb "Big Octahedral Dürbe" (Note: The location is identified on the register as the village of Pidhorodnie, which was merged into Bakhchysarai in the late 1950s.) Гробниця "Дюрбе великий восьмигранник"	Bakhchysarai	16th century	2 July 2020	Architectural	010098	More images	
Tomb "Small Octahedral Dürbe" Гробниця "Дюрбе малий восьмигранник"	Bakhchysarai	15th–16th centuries	2 July 2020	Architectural	010099	More images	
Tomb "Cuboid Dürbe" and "Minbar" Гробниця "Дюрбе кубовидне" і "Мембер"	Bakhchysarai	16th century	2 July 2020	Architectural	010100	More images More images	
Tomb "Ancient Dürbe" Гробниця "Старовинне Дюрбе"	Bakhchysarai	—	2 July 2020	Architectural	010101	More images	
Cave Monastery of Qaçı Kalyon Печерний монастир Качи-Кальон	Bashtanivka	8th – late 19th centuries	2 July 2020	Architectural	010084	More images	
Tower of "Kyz-Kule" Башта "Киз-Куле"	Kripke	After the 10th century	2 July 2020	Architectural	010088	More images	
Ruins of the cave town of "Eski-Kermen" Руїни печерного міста "Ескі-Кермен"	Kripke	6th century	2 July 2020	Architectural	010089	More images	
Cave church "Tepe Kermen" Печерна церква "Тепе Кермен"	Kudryne	5th–6th centuries	2 July 2020	Architectural	010090	More images	
Archangels Church (ruins) Архангельська церква (руїни)	Kudryne	1328	2 July 2020	Architectural	010091	More images	
Cave town of "Kyz-Kermen" Печерне місто "Киз-Кермен"	Kudryne	9th century	2 July 2020	Architectural	010092	More images	
Cave Church of the Donators Печерна церква Донаторів	Krasnyi Mak	10th–15th centuries	2 July 2020	Architectural	010093	More images	
Cave Monastery "Chylter Koba" Печерний монастир "Чилтер Коба"	Male Sadove	8th–15th centuries	2 July 2020	Architectural	010094	More images	
"Ust-Alma" archaeological complex: hillfort and grave field Археологічний комплекс "Усть-Альмінський": городище і некрополь	Pishchane	9th–4th centuries BCE	14 September 2009	Archaeological	010008-Н	More images	
Cave town of "Bakla" (ruins) Печерне місто "Бакла" (руїни)	Skalyste	4th–13th centuries	2 July 2020	Architectural	010095	More images	
"Süyren Fortress" archaeological complex (Note: The location is erroneously identified as the village of Male Sadove on the register.) Археологічний комплекс "Сюренська фортеця"	Velyke Sadove	9th–13th centuries	14 September 2009	Archaeological	010007-Н		
Defensive walls and Süyren Tower Кріпосні мури та Сюренська башта	Velyke Sadove	5th–6th centuries	2 July 2020	Architectural	010086	More images	
"Mangup-Kale" fortress and cave town complex Комплекс фортеці і печерного міста "Мангуп-Кале"	Velyke Sadove	5th–6th centuries, 14th–15th centuries	2 July 2020	Architectural	010087	More images	
Church of John the Baptist (ruins) Церква Івана Предтечі (руїни)	Verkhorichchia	14th–15th centuries	2 July 2020	Architectural	010085	More images	

== Bilohirsk Raion ==
Monuments of national significance in Bilohirsk Raion
Name	Location	Date constructed	Date designated	Type	Protection number	Photo	Ref.
St Elijah's Church Іллінська церква	Bahate	14th–15th centuries	2 July 2020	Architectural	010106	More images	
Archaeological complex on the Aq Qaya Plateau Археологічний комплекс на плато Ак-Кая	Bila Skelia, Vasylivka, Vyshenne	1.5 million – 10,000 BCE, 2nd millennium – 10th century BCE, 9th–4th centuries BCE, 5th–17th centuries	14 September 2009	Archaeological	010009-Н	More images	
Caravanserai Караван-Сарай	Bilohirsk	13th–16th centuries	2 July 2020	Architectural	010103	More images	
St Paraskeva's Church Парасківська церква	Topolivka	Before 8th century	2 July 2020	Architectural	010104	More images	
Church (ruins) Церква (руїни)	Topolivka	14th–15th centuries	2 July 2020	Architectural	010105	More images	
Catherine's mile Катерининська миля	Tsvitochne (Note: The location is identified as the "30th kilometre on the Simferopol–Feodosia highway" on the register. Tsvitochne is the nearest populated place.)	1786	2 July 2020	Architectural	010062	More images	

== Feodosia Raion ==
Monuments of national significance in Feodosia Raion
Name	Location	Date constructed	Date designated	Type	Protection number	Photo	Ref.
House where the artist I. K. Aivazovsky lived Будинок, у якому жив художник І. К. Айвазовський	Feodosia	1845–1892	14 September 2009	Historic	010030-Н	More images	
Grave of artist I. K. Aivazovsky Могила художника І. К. Айвазовського	Feodosia	1900	14 September 2009	Historic	010031-Н	More images	
Genoese fortress Генуезька фортеця	Feodosia	13th–16th centuries	2 July 2020	Architectural	010055	More images	
Clement Tower Башта Климента	Feodosia	1348	2 July 2020	Architectural	010055/1	More images	
Christ Tower Башта Криско	Feodosia	14th century	2 July 2020	Architectural	010055/2	More images	
St John the Baptist Church Церква Івана Предтечі	Feodosia	1348	2 July 2020	Architectural	010055/3	More images	
St John the Evangelist Church Церква Івана Богослова	Feodosia	14th century	2 July 2020	Architectural	010055/4	More images	
St George's Church Церква Георгія	Feodosia	14th century	2 July 2020	Architectural	010055/5	More images	
St Stephan's Church Церква Стефана	Feodosia	13th–14th centuries	2 July 2020	Architectural	010055/6	More images	
Fortress walls Стіни фортеці	Feodosia	14th century	2 July 2020	Architectural	010055/7	More images	
Dock Tower Докова башта	Feodosia	14th century	2 July 2020	Architectural	010055/8	More images	
Turkish bathhouse Турецька баня	Feodosia	15th–16th centuries	2 July 2020	Architectural	010055/9	More images	
City fortress Міська фортеця	Feodosia	14th–15th centuries	2 July 2020	Architectural	010056		
Fortress walls Стіни фортеці	Feodosia	14th century	2 July 2020	Architectural	010056/1	More images	
Constantine Tower Башта Костянтина	Feodosia	1382–1448	2 July 2020	Architectural	010056/2	More images	
Thomas Tower Башта Фоми	Feodosia	1373	2 July 2020	Architectural	010056/3	More images	
Giovanni di Scafa Tower Башта Джіовані ді Скаффа	Feodosia	1342	2 July 2020	Architectural	010056/4	More images	
Genoese bridge Генуезький міст	Feodosia	14th century	2 July 2020	Architectural	010057		
St Sergius Church Церква Сергія	Feodosia	14th century	2 July 2020	Architectural	010058	More images	
Sts Michael and Gabriel Church Церква Гаврила та Михайла	Feodosia	1408	2 July 2020	Architectural	010059	More images	
St George's Church Церква Георгія	Feodosia	1385	2 July 2020	Architectural	010060	More images	
Mosque Мечеть	Feodosia	1623	2 July 2020	Architectural	010061	More images	
Fountain Фонтан	Feodosia	16th century	2 July 2020	Architectural	010063	More images	
Fountain Фонтан	Feodosia	Late 19th century	2 July 2020	Architectural	010064	More images	
Dacha Stamboli building Будинок дачі Стамболі	Feodosia	Late 19th century	2 July 2020	Architectural	010065	More images	
Dacha Milos building Будинок дачі Мілос	Feodosia	Late 19th century	2 July 2020	Architectural	010066	More images	
Presentation Church Введенська церква	Feodosia	8th–9th centuries, 19th century	2 July 2020	Architectural	010067	More images	
Grave of poet and artist M. A. Voloshin Могила поета і художника М. О. Волошина	Koktebel	1932	14 September 2009	Historic	010032-Н	More images	
House where the poet and artist M. A. Voloshin lived Будинок, у якому жив поет і художник М. О. Волошин	Koktebel	Early 20th century	14 September 2009	Historic	010033-Н	More images	
Tower of Çoban Qule Башта Чабан-Куле	Morske	14th–15th centuries	2 July 2020	Architectural	010075	More images	
Archaeological complex "Karaul-Oba" Археологічний комплекс "Караул-Оба"	Novyi Svit, Vesele	2nd millennium BCE – 10th century BCE, 9th–4th centuries BCE	14 September 2009	Archaeological	010028-Н	More images	
Fortress of "Kutlak" Фортеця "Кутлак"	Novyi Svit, Vesele	2nd half of 1st century BCE	14 September 2009	Archaeological	010029-Н	More images	
St Elijah's Church Іллінська церква	Soniachna Dolyna (Note: Mentioned on the register under its pre-1960s name Laherne)	10th–11th centuries	2 July 2020	Architectural	010074	More images	
Mosque and medrese Мечеть і медресе	Staryi Krym	1314	2 July 2020	Architectural	010068	More images	
Ancient church Старовинна церква	Staryi Krym	10th–12th centuries	2 July 2020	Architectural	010069	More images	
Complex of the Surp Khach Monastery Комплекс монастиря Сурп-Хач	Staryi Krym	14th century	2 July 2020	Architectural	010070	More images	
Church Церква	Staryi Krym	1338	2 July 2020	Architectural	010070/1	More images	
Cells Келії	Staryi Krym	14th century	2 July 2020	Architectural	010070/2	More images	
Refectory Трапезна	Staryi Krym	14th century	2 July 2020	Architectural	010070/3	More images	
Fountains Фонтани	Staryi Krym	14th century	2 July 2020	Architectural	010070/4	More images	
Genoese fortess Генуезька фортеця	Sudak	14th–15th centuries	2 July 2020	Architectural	010071	More images	
Watch Tower Дозорна башта	Sudak	14th–15th centuries	2 July 2020	Architectural	010071/1	More images	
Jacobo Torsello Tower Башта Якобо Торсело	Sudak	1385	2 July 2020	Architectural	010071/2	More images	
Barbican Передмостове укріплення	Sudak	1385–1414	2 July 2020	Architectural	010071/3	More images	
Bernabo di Franchi di Pagano Tower Башта Бернардо Франко Пагана	Sudak	1414	2 July 2020	Architectural	010071/4	More images	
Pasquali Giudice Tower Башта Пасквале Джудиче	Sudak	1392	2 July 2020	Architectural	010071/5	More images	
Round Tower Кругла башта	Sudak	1385–1414	2 July 2020	Architectural	010071/6	More images	
Corrado Cicalo Tower Башта Корадо Чикало	Sudak	1404	2 July 2020	Architectural	010071/7	More images	
Luchini di Fiesco di Lavagna Tower Башта Лукині Флеско Лавані	Sudak	1409	2 July 2020	Architectural	010071/8	More images	
Unnamed Tower Безіменна башта	Sudak	14th–15th centuries	2 July 2020	Architectural	010071/9	More images	
Giovanni Marioni Tower Башта Джіовані Маріоні	Sudak	1387	2 July 2020	Architectural	010071/10	More images	
Baldo Guarco Tower Башта Гварко Румбальдо	Sudak	1394	2 July 2020	Architectural	010071/11	More images	
Tower Башта	Sudak	1385–1414	2 July 2020	Architectural	010071/12	More images	
Federico Astaguerra Tower Башта Фредеріко Астагвера	Sudak	1386	2 July 2020	Architectural	010071/13	More images	
Church of the Twelve Apostles Церква дванадцяти апостолів	Sudak	14th century	2 July 2020	Architectural	010071/14	More images	
Corner Tower Кутова башта	Sudak	14th–15th centuries	2 July 2020	Architectural	010071/15	More images	
Consul Tower Консульська башта	Sudak	14th–15th centuries	2 July 2020	Architectural	010071/16	More images	
George Tower Георгіївська башта	Sudak	14th–15th centuries	2 July 2020	Architectural	010071/17	More images	
Tower Башта	Sudak	1375–1414	2 July 2020	Architectural	010071/18	More images	
Ancient temple Старовинний храм	Sudak	15th century	2 July 2020	Architectural	010071/19	More images	
Church with an arcade Церква з аркадою	Sudak	Before 1322	2 July 2020	Architectural	010071/20	More images	
Underground structure Підземна споруда	Sudak	14th century	2 July 2020	Architectural	010071/21	More images	
Warehouse building no. 1 Складська споруда № 1	Sudak	1385–1414	2 July 2020	Architectural	010071/22	More images	
Warehouse building no. 2 Складська споруда № 2	Sudak	1385–1414	2 July 2020	Architectural	010071/23	More images	
Church of St Paraskeva (Note: The location is identified as the village of Uiutne, which was merged into Sudak in the 1970s.) Церква Параскеви	Sudak	10th century	2 July 2020	Architectural	010076	More images	

== Kerch Raion ==
Monuments of national significance in Kerch Raion
Name	Location	Date constructed	Date designated	Type	Protection number	Photo	Ref.
Archaeological complex of "Ilurat" Археологічний комплекс "Ілурат"	Ivanivka	9th–4th centuries BCE	14 September 2009	Historic	010025-Н	More images	
Fortress ruins Руїни фортеці	Kamianske (Note: Spelt Kamenske (Каменське) on the register)	17th–18th centuries (Note: Erroneously dated to the 13th century on the register)	2 July 2020	Architectural	010107	More images	
Building complex of the Kerch Fortress Комплекс споруд Керченської фортеці	Kerch	19th century	14 September 2009	Historic, science and technology	010013-Н	More images	
Archaeological complex of the "Ancient city of Tyritake" Археологічний комплекс "Стародавнє місто Тірітака"	Kerch	9th–4th centuries BCE, 5th–17th centuries	14 September 2009	Archaeological	010014-Н	More images	
Archaeological complex of the "Ancient city of Myrmekion" Археологічний комплекс "Стародавнє місто Мірмекій"	Kerch	9th–4th centuries BCE	14 September 2009	Archaeological	010015-Н	More images	
Old Rus' hillfort of the legendary city of Korchiv Давньоруське городище літописного міста Корчів	Kerch	9th–13th centuries	14 September 2009	Archaeological	010016-Н		
Architectural and archaeological complex of the "Ancient city of Pantikapaion" Архітектурно-археологічний комплекс "Стародавнє місто Пантікапей"	Kerch	9th–4th centuries BCE	14 September 2009	Archaeological	010017-Н	More images	
Obelisk of Glory Обеліск Слави	Kerch	1944	14 September 2009	Historic	010018-Н	More images	
Antique earthen crypt Античний земляний склеп	Kerch	9th–4th centuries BCE	14 September 2009	Archaeological	010019-Н		
Antique stone crypt – "Crypt of Demeter" Античний кам'яний склеп - "Склеп Деметри"	Kerch	—	14 September 2009	Archaeological	010020-Н	More images	
Settlement "Kamianka" Поселення "Кам'янка"	Kerch	2nd millennium BCE – 10th century	14 September 2009	Archaeological	010021-Н	More images	
Archaeological complex of the "Ancient city of Nymphaion" Археологічний комплекс "Стародавнє місто Німфей"	Kerch	9th–4th centuries BCE	14 September 2009	Archaeological	010022-Н	More images	
Antique hillfort of "Parthenion" Античне городище "Парфеній"	Kerch	9th–4th centuries BCE	14 September 2009	Archaeological	010023-Н	More images	
"Adjimushkay" memorial complex Меморіальний комплекс "Аджимушкай"	Kerch	1903–1907, 1919, 1941–1944, 1982	14 September 2009	Historic	010024-Н	More images	
Mesaksudi House Будинок Месаксуді	Kerch	Late 19th – early 20th centuries	19 October 2012	Architectural	010040-Н	More images	
Church of St John the Baptist Церква Івана Предтечі	Kerch	8th century	2 July 2020	Architectural	010048	More images	
Melek-Chesme Kurgan Мелек-Чесменський курган	Kerch	4th century BCE	2 July 2020	Architectural	010049	More images	
Royal Kurgan Царський курган	Kerch	4th century BCE	2 July 2020	Architectural	010050	More images	
Yeni-Kale Fortress Фортеця Ені-Кале	Kerch	1703	2 July 2020	Architectural	010051	More images	
Greek Church Грецька церква	Kerch	Mid-19th century	2 July 2020	Architectural	010053	More images	
Great and Small Stairs Сходи Великі та Малі	Kerch	Mid-19th century	2 July 2020	Architectural	010054	More images	
Archaeological complex of "Kimmerikon" Археологічний комплекс "Кіммерик"	Marivka	9th–4th centuries BCE	14 September 2009	Archaeological	010026-Н		

== Simferopol Raion ==
Monuments of national significance in Simferopol Raion
Name	Location	Date constructed	Date designated	Type	Protection number	Photo	Ref.
Mosque (ruins) Мечеть (руїни)	Dzholman (Note: Mentioned under its pre-2023 name Pionerske on the register, a name that is still de facto used by the Russian authorities)	14th–15th centuries	2 July 2020	Architectural	010102	More images	
Scythian hillfort of "Kermen-Kyr" Скіфське городище "Кермен-Кир"	Myrne	9th–4th centuries BCE	14 September 2009	Archaeological	010027-Н	More images	
Archaeological complex of "Scythian Neapolis": hillfort and necropoleis Археологічний комплекс "Неаполь Скіфський": городище і некрополі	Simferopol	9th century BCE – 4th century CE	14 September 2009	Archaeological	010001-Н	More images	
Grave of painter of battle scenes N. S. Samokish Могила живописця баталіста М. С. Самокиша	Simferopol	1958	14 September 2009	Historic	010002-Н	More images	
Palace in Salhirka Палац в Салгірці	Simferopol	Early 19th century	2 July 2020	Architectural	010039	More images	
Residential building Жилий будинок	Simferopol	1826	2 July 2020	Architectural	010040	More images	
Residential building Жилий будинок	Simferopol	Late 18th – early 19th centuries	2 July 2020	Architectural	010041	More images	
Hospital Госпіталь	Simferopol	1855	2 July 2020	Architectural	010042	More images	
Pallas Manor Садиба Палласа	Simferopol	Late 18th century	2 July 2020	Architectural	010043	More images	
Residential building (of Pallas) Жилий будинок (Палласа)	Simferopol	Late 18th century	2 July 2020	Architectural	010043/1	More images	
Farmhouse and two outbuildings Господарський будинок та два флігелі	Simferopol	Late 18th century	2 July 2020	Architectural	010043/2	More images	

== Yalta Raion ==
Monuments of national significance in Yalta Raion
Name	Location	Date constructed	Date designated	Type	Protection number	Photo	Ref.
Building complex of the Vorontsov Palace Комплекс споруд Воронцовського палацу	Alupka	1830–1846	2 July 2020	Architectural	010109	More images	
Main building Головний корпус	Alupka	1830–1837	2 July 2020	Architectural	010109/1	More images	
Library wing Бібліотечний корпус	Alupka	1830–1837	2 July 2020	Architectural	010109/2	More images	
Shuvalov wing Шуваловський корпус	Alupka	1830–1837	2 July 2020	Architectural	010109/3	More images	
Service wing Господарський корпус	Alupka	1830–1837	2 July 2020	Architectural	010109/4	More images	
Teahouse and park structures Чайний будинок і паркові споруди	Alupka	1824–1860	2 July 2020	Architectural	010109/5	More images	
Grave of writer S. N. Sergeyev-Tsensky Могила письменника С. М. Сергєєва-Ценського	Alushta	1958	14 September 2009	Historic	010003-Н	More images	
Archaeological complex of "Aluston" Археологічний комплекс "Алустон"	Alushta	5th–9th centuries, 9th–13th centuries, 14th–17th centuries	14 September 2009	Archaeological	010104-Н	More images	
Villa "Anna" Вілла "Анна"	Alushta	1908–1910	19 October 2012	Architectural	010038-Н	More images	
Villa "Maryna" Вілла "Марина"	Alushta	1914–1915	19 October 2012	Architectural	010039-Н	More images	
Square Tower Квадратна башта	Alushta	6th century	2 July 2020	Architectural	010072	More images	
Round Tower Кругла башта	Alushta	6th century	2 July 2020	Architectural	010073	More images	
Church of Resurrection Церква Воскресіння	Foros	19th century	2 July 2020	Architectural	010119	More images	
Palace Палац	Foros	Late 19th century	2 July 2020	Architectural	010121	More images	
Archaeological complex of "Charax Fortress" Археологічний комплекс "Фортеця Харакс"	Haspra	1st–3rd centuries (Note: Erroneously dated to the 9th–4th centuries BCE on the register)	14 September 2009	Archaeological	010035-Н	More images	
Dacha Kichkine Дача Кічкіне	Haspra	Early 19th century	2 July 2020	Architectural	010110	More images	
Palace building complex Комплекс споруд палацу	Haspra	1831–1836	2 July 2020	Architectural	010111	More images	
Palace "Swallow's Nest" Палац "Ластівчине гніздо"	Haspra	1912	2 July 2020	Architectural	010112	More images	
Building where poet A. S. Pushkin lived Будинок, у якому жив поет О. С. Пушкін	Hurzuf	Late 18th – early 19th centuries	14 September 2009	Historic	010036-Н	More images	
Complex of dacha-hotels of P. I. Gubonin Комплекс дач-готелів П. І. Губоніна	Hurzuf	1885–1890	19 October 2012	Architectural, historic, urban planning	010041-Н	More images	
Building 1 Корпус 1	Hurzuf	1885	19 October 2012	Architectural, historic, urban planning	010041/1-Н	More images	
Building 2 Корпус 2	Hurzuf	1889	19 October 2012	Architectural, historic, urban planning	010041/2-Н	More images	
Building 3 Корпус 3	Hurzuf	1890	19 October 2012	Architectural, historic, urban planning	010041/3-Н	More images	
Building 4 Корпус 4	Hurzuf	1890	19 October 2012	Architectural, historic, urban planning	010041/4-Н	More images	
Building 5 Корпус 5	Hurzuf	1880	19 October 2012	Architectural, historic, urban planning	010041/5-Н	More images	
Building 6 Корпус 6	Hurzuf	1890	19 October 2012	Architectural, historic, urban planning	010041/6-Н	More images	
Building 7 Корпус 7	Hurzuf	1888	19 October 2012	Architectural, historic, urban planning	010041/7-Н	More images	
Building 8 Корпус 8	Hurzuf	1886	19 October 2012	Architectural, historic, urban planning	010041/8-Н	More images	
Building 9 Корпус 9	Hurzuf	1890	19 October 2012	Architectural, historic, urban planning	010041/9-Н	More images	
Library Бібліотека	Hurzuf	1897	19 October 2012	Architectural, historic, urban planning	010041/10-Н	More images	
Restaurant and dining hall Ресторан-їдальня	Hurzuf	1885	19 October 2012	Architectural, historic, urban planning	010041/11-Н	More images	
Gorzubita Fortress (ruins) Фортеця Горзувіти (руїни)	Hurzuf	6th–15th centuries	2 July 2020	Architectural	010113	More images	
Dulber Palace Палац "Дюльбер"	Koreiz	1897–1911	2 July 2020	Architectural	010114	More images	
Livadiia Palace complex Лівадійський палацовий комплекс	Livadiia	19th – early 20th centuries	14 September 2009	Historic	010037-Н	More images	
Complex of palace buildings Комплекс споруд палацу	Livadiia	1910–1911	2 July 2020	Architectural	010115	More images	
Great Palace Великий палац	Livadiia	1910–1911	2 July 2020	Architectural	010115/1	More images	
Church of Exaltation Церква Здвиження	Livadiia	1864	2 July 2020	Architectural	010115/2	More images	
Freedericksz Palace Палац Фредерікса	Livadiia	1916	2 July 2020	Architectural	010115/3	More images	
Courtiers' building Світський корпус	Livadiia	Late 19th century	2 July 2020	Architectural	010115/4	More images	
Park structures Паркові споруди	Livadiia	19th century	2 July 2020	Architectural	010115/5	More images	
Archaeological complex of "Watchtower fortification of Funa" Археологічний комплекс "Сторожеве укріплення Фуна"	Luchyste	9th–13th centuries	14 September 2009	Archaeological	010005-Н	More images	
Building complex of the palace of Alexander III Комплекс споруд палацу Олександра III	Masandra	1880–1902	19 October 2012	Architectural, monumental art	010042-Н	More images	
Palace of Alexander III Палац Олександра III	Masandra	1880–1902	19 October 2012	Architectural, monumental art	010042/1-Н	More images	
Semicircular retaining wall with arches, vases, lantern columns, and wall fountains Напівкругла підпірна стіна з арками, вазами, ліхтарними колонами і пристінними фонтанами	Masandra	1880–1902	19 October 2012	Architectural, monumental art	010042/2-Н	More images	
Retaining wall with a four-step staircase, Sphinx sculptures, vases, and pillars Підпірна стіна із чотирищаблевими сходами, скульптурами «Сфінкс», вазами і стовпами	Masandra	1880–1902	19 October 2012	Architectural, monumental art	010042/3-Н	More images	
Retaining wall with vases and a pedestal Підпірна стіна з вазами і тумбою	Masandra	1880–1902	19 October 2012	Architectural, monumental art	010042/4-Н	More images	
Sculpture group on the palace's western façade (two "Satyr" sculptures, two "Dragon" sculptures, three fountain cups) Скульптурна група на західному фасаді палацу (дві скульптури "Сатир", дві скульптури "Дракон", три чаші фонтанів)	Masandra	1880–1902	19 October 2012	Architectural, monumental art	010042/5-Н	More images	
Decorative pool Басейн декоративний	Masandra	1880–1902	19 October 2012	Architectural, monumental art	010042/6-Н	More images	
Vases on the main entrance porch (6) Вази на ґанку головного входу (6 штук)	Masandra	1880–1902	19 October 2012	Architectural, monumental art	010042/7-Н	Vases next to stairs leading to an entrance of a Châteauesque villa	
Balustrade with vases on the western façade's terrace Балюстрада з вазами на терасі західного фасаду	Masandra	1880–1902	19 October 2012	Architectural, monumental art	010042/8-Н	A terrace of a Châteauesque villa	
Paired columns Спарені колони	Masandra	1880–1902	19 October 2012	Architectural, monumental art	010042/9-Н	Paired columns on the second storey of a Châteauesque villa	
Stairs Сходи	Masandra	1880–1902	19 October 2012	Architectural, monumental art	010042/10-Н	More images	
Semi-rotunda gazebo Альтанка-напівротонда	Oreanda	1843	2 July 2020	Architectural	010117	More images	
Church Церква	Oreanda	Late 19th century	2 July 2020	Architectural	010118	More images	
Palace Палац	Sanatorne	1830s	2 July 2020	Architectural	010116	More images	
Palace Палац	Utos	1900	2 July 2020	Architectural	010038	More images	
Building where poet A. P. Chekhov lived Будинок, у якому жив письменник А. П. Чехов	Yalta	1899–1904	14 September 2009	Historic	010034-Н	More images	
Dacha of Vadarska Дача Вадарської	Yalta	1902–1910	2 July 2020	Architectural	010108	More images	

== Yevpatoria Raion ==
Monuments of national significance in Yevpatoria Raion
Name	Location	Date constructed	Date designated	Type	Protection number	Photo	Ref.
Mass grave of victims of fascist terror Братська могила жертв фашистського терору	Yevpatoria	1941–1942	14 September 2009	Historic	010010-Н	More images	
Building of A. S. Pushkin Yevpatoria Theatre Будівля театру імені О. С. Пушкіна	Yevpatoria	1908–1910	14 September 2009	Historic	010011-Н	More images	
Juma-Jami Mosque Мечеть Джума-Джамі	Yevpatoria	1552	2 July 2020	Architectural	010044	More images	
Tekke of Dervishes (monastery) Теккіє дервішів (монастир)	Yevpatoria	14th–15th centuries	2 July 2020	Architectural	010045	More images	
Turkish bathhouse Турецька баня	Yevpatoria	16th century	2 July 2020	Architectural	010046	More images	
Complex of kenasas Комплекс кенас	Yevpatoria	18th century	2 July 2020	Architectural	010047	More images	
Big kenasa Велика кенаса	Yevpatoria	18th century	2 July 2020	Architectural	010047/1	More images	
Small kenasa Мала кенаса	Yevpatoria	18th century	2 July 2020	Architectural	010047/2	More images	
Courtyards with arcades Двори з аркадами	Yevpatoria	18th century	2 July 2020	Architectural	010047/3	More images	
Multilayered hillfort "Chaika" Багатошарове городище "Чайка"	Zaozerne	9th–4th centuries BCE	14 September 2009	Archaeological	010012-Н	More images	
