= Otlu Qaya =

Cliff in Crimea

Otlu Qaya (Crimean Tatar: Otlu Qaya; Ukrainian: Отлу-Кая, romanized: Otlu-Kaia; Russian: Дырковатая, romanized: Dyrkovataya) is a cliff situated in the southeast of Crimea in a valley between Koktebel and Otuzy, north of Kara Dag Mountain. The height of the cliff is 263 meters above sea level. The name comes from Crimean Tatar and can be translated as "grassy" or "fire rock". The rock has a through hole.

Stones once scattered across the mountain slope—which from a distance resembled a grazing flock of sheep—were used in the construction of the highway; however, local residents still refer to the area as the "petrified flock."

Many folk legends are associated with this rock. According to one of them, a young shepherd, tending his sheep nearby, noticed a half-naked girl and, forgetting his duty of hospitality, rushed toward her with ill intent, whereupon he—and his entire flock—instantly turned to stone.

== See also ==
- Aq Qaya
- Topraq Qaya
- Otuz Qaya

== Sources ==
- Sevostyanov, Alexander (2014). Крымские легенды и сказания [Crimean Legends and Tales] (in Russian). Vol. 1. Simferopol: Osteon-Press.
- Köppen, Pyotr (1836), Указатель к картѣ Южнаго Крыма: принадлежащей к Крымскому сборнику [Index to the Map of Southern Crimea: Accompanying Pyotr Köppen’s Crimean Miscellany] (in Russian), vol. 1, St. Petersburg: Imperial Academy of Sciences
- Ученые записки [Scientific Notes] (in Russian). St. Petersburg: Leningrad State University. 1938.
