= Monuments of national significance in Sevastopol =

Russian-language Soviet-era cultural heritage plaque of the Kalamita Fortress in Inkerman

The State Register of Immovable Monuments of Ukraine classifies cultural heritage monuments as either of local or national significance. (Note: 'Monuments of national significance' may also be translated as 'monuments of national importance'; Ukrainian: пам'ятки національного значення) To be classified as nationally significant, a monument must have had a substantial impact on Ukraine's culture, been associated with major historical events or individuals who shaped national culture, represented a masterpiece of creative genius, or embodied a disappeared civilisation or disappeared artistic style. Monuments of national significance are inscribed on the register by the Cabinet of Ministers, and are protected and maintained by the Ministry of Culture. All listed monuments belong to at least one of the following categories: archaeology, history, monumental art, architecture, urban planning, garden and park art, landscape, or science and technology. (Note: The categories are defined as such: Archaeological monuments are underground or underwater remains of human activity that bear testimony to the origin or development of civilisation.; Historic monuments are buildings, structures, burials, and other sites associated with important historical events or the lives and activities of prominent individuals.; Monuments of monumental art are works of fine art.; Architectural monuments are buildings and structures that retain full or partial authenticity and express characteristics of a particular culture, era, style, construction technique, or represent works of renowned architects.; Urban planning monuments are historic neighbourhoods, streets, squares, or ensembles with preserved spatial layouts and architectural integrity.; Monuments of garden and park art combine park construction with natural or anthropogenic landscapes.; Landscape monuments are natural areas possessing historical value.; Monuments of science and technology are industrial, engineering, or scientific sites that reflect the scientific and technological development of an era or discipline.)

The first attempts to establish registers of protected buildings were undertaken in 1917 and 1918 by the Ukrainian People's Republic. These efforts continued in the 1920s in Soviet Ukraine, culminating in the listing of thousands of monuments, but were halted in the 1930s with the dissolution of relevant institutions and the active destruction of cultural—particularly religious—heritage. The listing of cultural heritage monuments in the region was renewed in 1956. A list of architectural monuments was approved in 1963, followed by a separate list of artistic, historic, and archaeological monuments in 1965. Both lists remained in use after Ukraine declared independence in 1991. On 8 June 2000, the State Register of Immovable Monuments was established with the adoption of the law On the Protection of Cultural Heritage. All entries from the Soviet-era list of artistic, historic, and archaeological monuments were transferred to the new register on 14 September 2009. The transfer of monuments from the Soviet architectural register, however, has proceeded more slowly and remains incomplete as of 2026, although the process has accelerated in recent years. At the same time, a number of sites have been deprived of their protected status to comply with decommunisation and derussification laws in effect since 2015 and 2023, respectively.

Since Russia's occupation and internationally unrecognised annexation of the Crimean peninsula in 2014, the Autonomous Republic of Crimea and the city with special status of Sevastopol have been disputed, with most countries recognising the territory as de jure part of Ukraine while de facto it remains under Russian control. Since 2014, the Russian-governed federal city of Sevastopol has been reclassifying all its monuments on Ukrainian registers according to the Russian system, which divides monuments into those of federal, regional, and local (municipal) significance; in particular, many federal monuments were listed on 12 February 2016.

Sevastopol contains 37 monuments of national significance. (Note: No monuments of national significance in the city remain on the Soviet-era register.) It is divided into four urban districts, (Note: As part of a 2023 reform, parts of Sevastopol have de jure been incorporated into Bakhchysarai Raion of the Autonomous Republic of Crimea. This division is not de facto used as it is unrecognised by the Russian authorities. In addition, this change is largely not reflected in Ukraine's State Register of Immovable Monuments as of 2026 (with the exception of three monuments: Baidar Gate, Shuldan Monastery, and Chylter-Marmara Monastery). This list covers the sites located within pre-2023 Sevastopol.) – Balaklavskyi, Haharinskyi, Leninskyi, and Nakhimovskyi – which include 16, 6, 9, and 6 monuments of national significance, respectively. Of the total, 15 are classified as archaeological monuments, 14 as architectural, 5 as monumental art, and 3 as historic. The latest inscriptions date to June 2020. One monument—Inkerman Cave Monastery—is listed twice, though the second listing also includes the adjacent Kalamita Fortress. Another monument—Tauric Chersonesus—is also designated as a World Heritage Site.

== List ==
Monuments of national significance in Sevastopol
Name (Note: The names listed are unofficial translations as the register is only available in Ukrainian. The official Ukrainian names are shown below each translation, with links to the corresponding Ukrainian Wikipedia articles if applicable.)	Location	Date constructed (Note: Datings of the monuments as indicated on the register)	Date designated (Note: For monuments previously listed on a Soviet-era register, the date of transfer to the modern register is indicated.)	Type	Protection number (Note: Every monument is assigned a unique protection number, and those of national significance located in Sevastopol start with the digits 27. The three monuments erroneously indicated on the register as located outside of pre-2023 Sevastopol start with the digits 01.)	Photo	Ref.
Fortress ruins Руїни фортеці	Balaklava	15th century	2 July 2020	Architectural	270029	More images	
Murzak-Koba cave dwelling Стоянка печерна Мурзак-Коба	Chornorichchia (Note: Spelt Chornorichenske (Чорноріченське) on the register)	1.5 million – 10,000 BCE, 9th–7th millennia BCE	14 September 2009	Archaeological	270017-Н	More images	
Chorhun Tower Чоргунська башта	Chornorichchia	15th century	2 July 2020	Architectural	270030	More images	
St George's Monastery Георгіївський монастир	Fiolent	11th–13th centuries	14 September 2009	Archaeological	270019-Н	More images	
Baidar Gate Байдарські ворота	Foros (Note: Although the monument is located within the pre-2023 boundaries of Sevastopol, the settlement of Foros in the Autonomous Republic of Crimea is the closest populated place.)	1848	2 July 2020	Architectural	0100120	More images	
Uch-Bash settlement Поселення Уч-Баш	Inkerman	9th–4th centuries BCE	14 September 2009	Archaeological	270011-Н	More images	
Cave monastery Печерний монастир	Inkerman	9th–13th centuries	14 September 2009	Archaeological	270012-Н	More images	
Zahaitanske fortified settlement Загайтанське укріплене поселення	Inkerman	9th–4th centuries BCE, 11th–13th centuries	14 September 2009	Archaeological	270014-Н	More images	
Kalamita Fortress and Cave Monastery in Inkerman Фортеця Каламіта та Печерний монастир в Інкермані	Inkerman	5th–15th centuries	2 July 2020	Architectural	270022	More images More images	
Grave field no. 15 Могильник №15	Khmelnytske	9th–4th centuries BCE	14 September 2009	Archaeological	270018-Н		
Church of St Elijah Храм Св. Іллі	Laspi Tract	11th–13th centuries	14 September 2009	Archaeological	270013-Н	More images	
Shan-Koba cave dwelling Стоянка печерна Шан-Коба	Peredove	1.5 million – 10,000 BCE, 9th–7th millennia BCE	14 September 2009	Archaeological	270015-Н		
Fatma-Koba cave dwelling Стоянка печерна Фатьма-Коба	Peredove	1.5 million – 10,000 BCE	14 September 2009	Archaeological	270016-Н		
Complex "Ancient city of Chersonesus Taurica" Комплекс "Стародавнє місто Херсонес-Таврійський"	Sevastopol proper	9th–4th centuries BCE, 4th–5th centuries	14 September 2009	Archaeological	270001-Н	More images	
Brotherhood Cemetery of the defenders of Sevastopol, Church of St Nicholas Братське кладовище захисників м. Севастополя, Храм св. Миколи	Sevastopol proper	1854–1855, 1857–1870	14 September 2009	Archaeological	270002-Н	More images	
Memorial complex of monuments of the city defence in 1854–1855 "Historical Boulevard" Меморіальний комплекс пам'яток оборони міста в 1854–1855 роках "Історичний бульвар"	Sevastopol proper	1905–1959	14 September 2009	Historic	270003-Н	More images	
Monument to E. I. Totleben and Russian sappers Пам'ятник Е. І. Тотлебену і російським саперам	Sevastopol proper	1909	14 September 2009	Monumental art	270004-Н	More images	
Memorial complex of monuments of the city defence in 1854–1855 "Malakhov Kurgan" Меморіальний комплекс пам'яток оборони міста в 1854–1855 роках, 1941–1944 роках "Малахів курган"	Sevastopol proper	1905–1959	14 September 2009	Historic	270005-Н	More images	
Monument to the Russian naval officer and vice admiral V. A. Kornilov Пам'ятник російському флотоводцю віце-адміралу В. О. Корнілову	Sevastopol proper	1905, 1983	14 September 2009	Monumental art	270006-Н	More images	
Monument to the Hero of the Russo-Turkish War of 1828–1829 A. I. Kazarsky Пам'ятник Герою російсько турецької війни 1828–1829 років О. І. Казарському	Sevastopol proper	1834	14 September 2009	Monumental art	270007-Н	More images	
Monument to the Russian naval officer and admiral P. S. Nakhimov Пам'ятник російському флотоводцю адміралу П. С. Нахімову	Sevastopol proper	1959	14 September 2009	Monumental art	270008-Н	More images	
Memorial complex "Mount Sapun" Меморіальний комплекс "Сапун-гора"	Sevastopol proper	1944–1979	14 September 2009	Historic	270009-Н	More images	
Monument to the Sunken Ships Пам'ятник затопленим кораблям	Sevastopol proper	1905	14 September 2009	Monumental art	270010-Н	More images	
Complex of the Chersonesus Taurica necropolis and the Monastery of the Theotokos of Blachernae Комплекс некрополя Херсонесу Таврійського і монастиря Богоматері Влахернської	Sevastopol proper	4th century BC – 13th century	19 October 2012	Archaeological	270020-Н		
Necropolis Некрополь	Sevastopol proper	4th century BC – 13th century	19 October 2012	Archaeological	270020/1-Н	More images	
Monastery of the Theotokos of Blachernae Монастир Богоматері Влахернської	Sevastopol proper	4th century BC – 13th century	19 October 2012	Archaeological	270020/2-Н	More images	
Ancient road to Chersonesus with the remains of production workshops Давня дорога до Херсонесу із залишками виробничих майстерень	Sevastopol proper	4th century BC – 13th century	19 October 2012	Archaeological	270020/3-Н	More images	
Sts Peter and Paul Cathedral Петропавлівський собор	Sevastopol proper	1848	2 July 2020	Architectural	270020	More images	
Count's Wharf Графська пристань	Sevastopol proper	1846	2 July 2020	Architectural	270021	More images	
St Michael's Cathedral Михайлівський собор	Sevastopol proper	1848	2 July 2020	Architectural	270023	More images	
Tower of the Winds Башта вітрів	Sevastopol proper	1844	2 July 2020	Architectural	270024	More images	
Aqueduct Акведук	Sevastopol proper	Early 19th century	2 July 2020	Architectural	270025	More images	
Catherine's mile Катерининська миля	Sevastopol proper	1787	2 July 2020	Architectural	270026	More images	
St Volodymyr's Cathedral in Chersonesus Володимирський собор в Херсонесі	Sevastopol proper	1861	2 July 2020	Architectural	270027	More images	
St Nicholas Church Pyramid at the Brotherhood Cemetery Миколаївська церква-піраміда на братському кладовищі	Sevastopol proper	1861	2 July 2020	Architectural	270028	More images	
Cave monastery "Shuldan" Печерний монастир "Шулдан"	Ternivka	8th–15th centuries	2 July 2020	Architectural	010096	More images	
Cave monastery "Chylter-Marmara" Печерний монастир "Чилтер Мармара"	Ternivka	8th–15th centuries	2 July 2020	Architectural	010097	More images	
