= St. Vladimir's Cathedral, Sevastopol =

Russian Orthodox church

Coordinates: 44°36′37″N 33°31′25″E

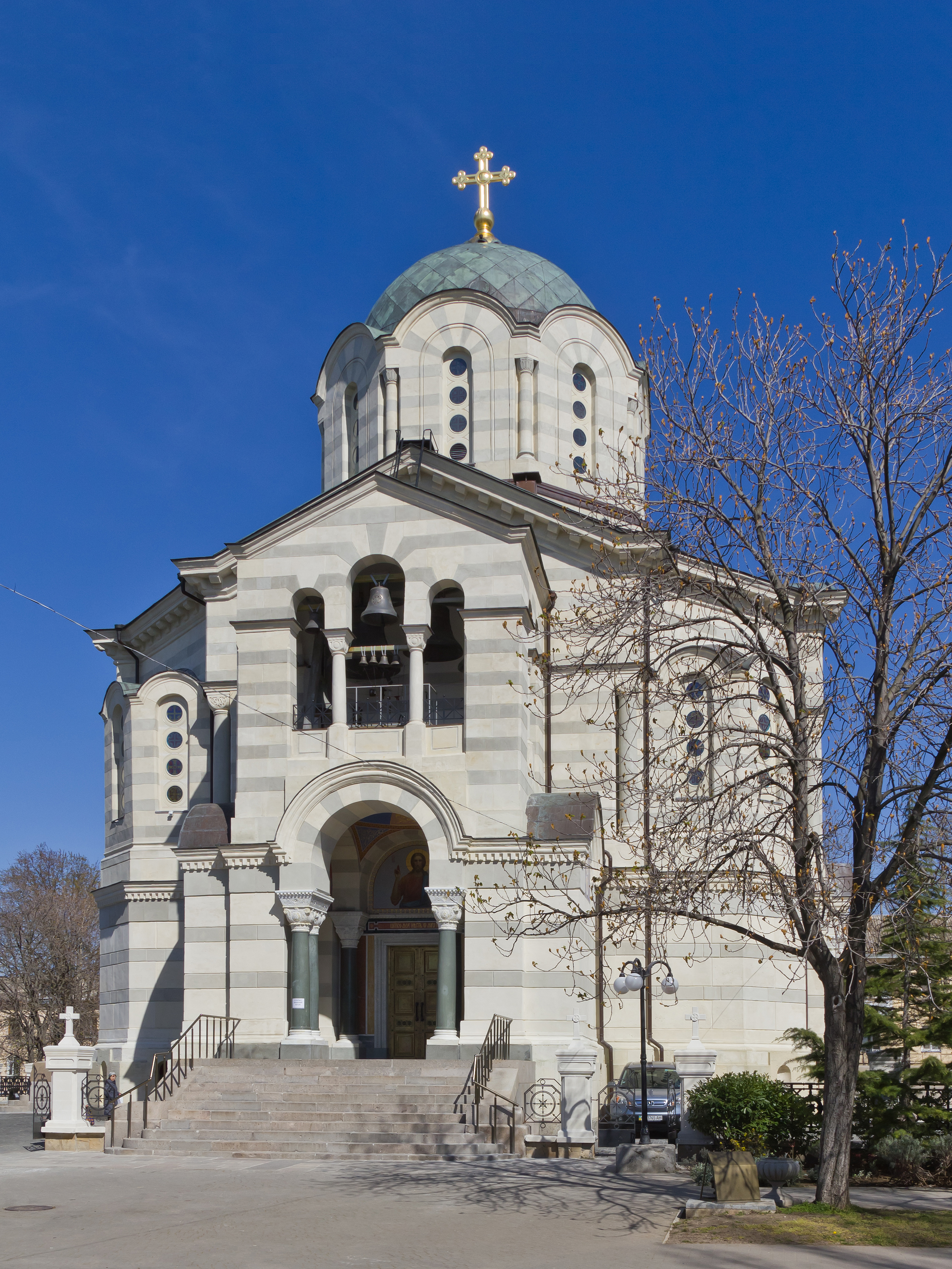
The Admirals' Burial Vault in Sevastopol

St. Vladimir's Cathedral (Russian: Владимирский собор) is an Orthodox church in Sevastopol which was built in the aftermath of the Crimean War as a memorial to the heroes of the Siege of Sevastopol (1854–1855).

== History ==
It was the admiral Mikhail Lazarev who came up with the idea to build a cathedral consecrated to Vladimir the Great in Sevastopol rather than in Chersonesos Taurica as was initially intended. The church contains the tombs of Lazarev and three of his disciples – Vladimir Kornilov, Vladimir Istomin and Pavel Nakhimov – who died during the siege.

The architecture of the church is Neo-Byzantine. The original design was submitted by Konstantin Thon for the Chersonesus Cathedral. It was reworked by a local architect, Aleksey Avdeyev. The lower church was consecrated in 1881, and the upper church was finished seven years later.

The building rises to a height of 32.5 meters. A team of Swiss and Italian artists decorated the marble-clad interior. The names of the heroes of the 1850s siege are inscribed on the walls. The tombs of the admirals were destroyed by the Soviets in 1931. The church sustained further damage in the Second World War.

Archbishop Joachim (Levitsky) was supposedly martyred by Bolsheviks inside St Vladimir's Cathedral in April 1920 (or perhaps as late as 1921) by being crucified upside-down on the royal doors of the iconostasis. The cathedral's archpriest, Aleksei Nazarevsky, was also allegedly murdered along with him, although the details of when either man died, yet alone how, are not clear. Sevastopol was under the occupation of the White Army of Pyotr Wrangel until November 1920, and the last definite information about Levitsky is his departure for the city in 1918.

== Gallery ==
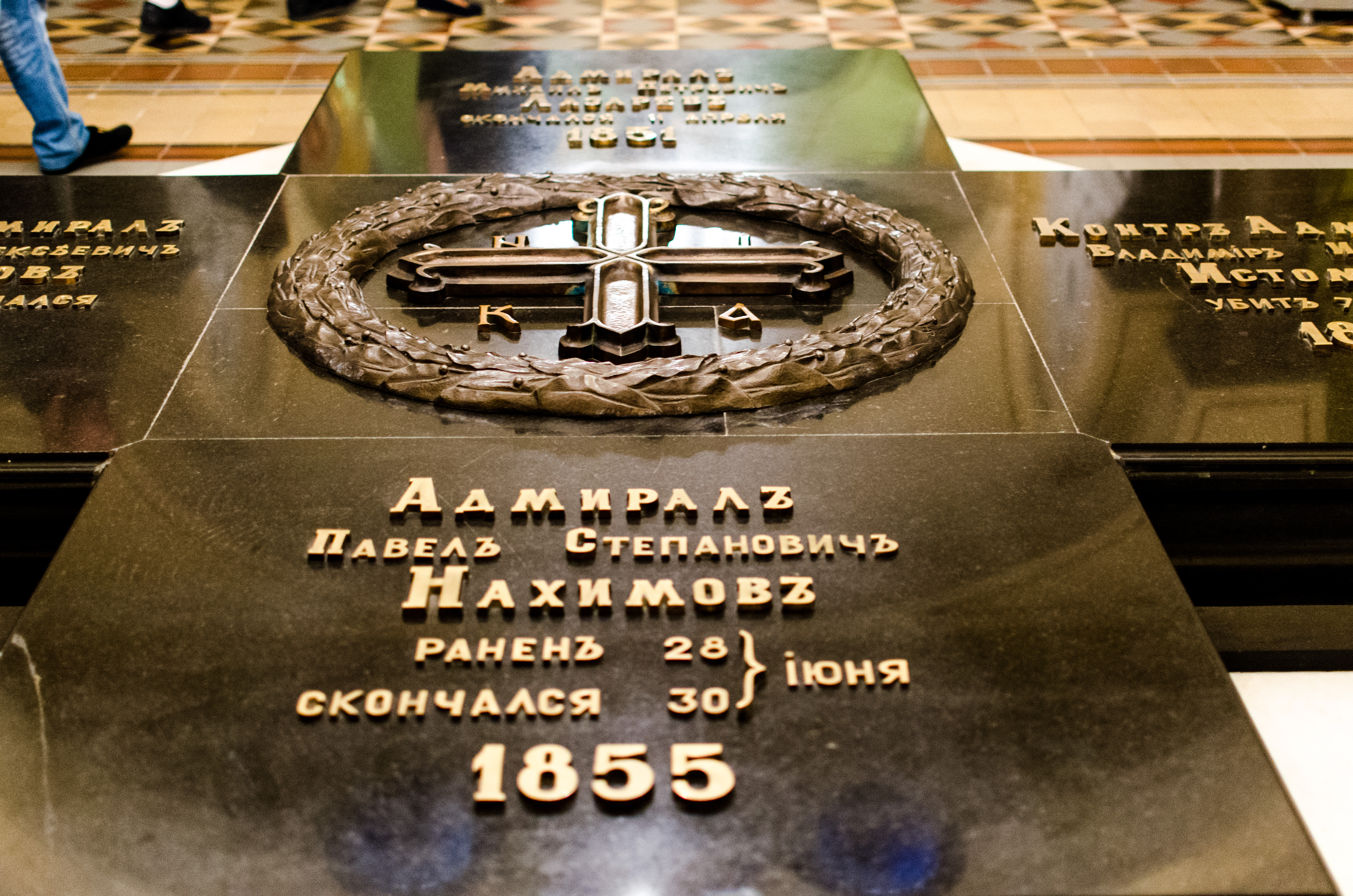
Nakhimov's tomb

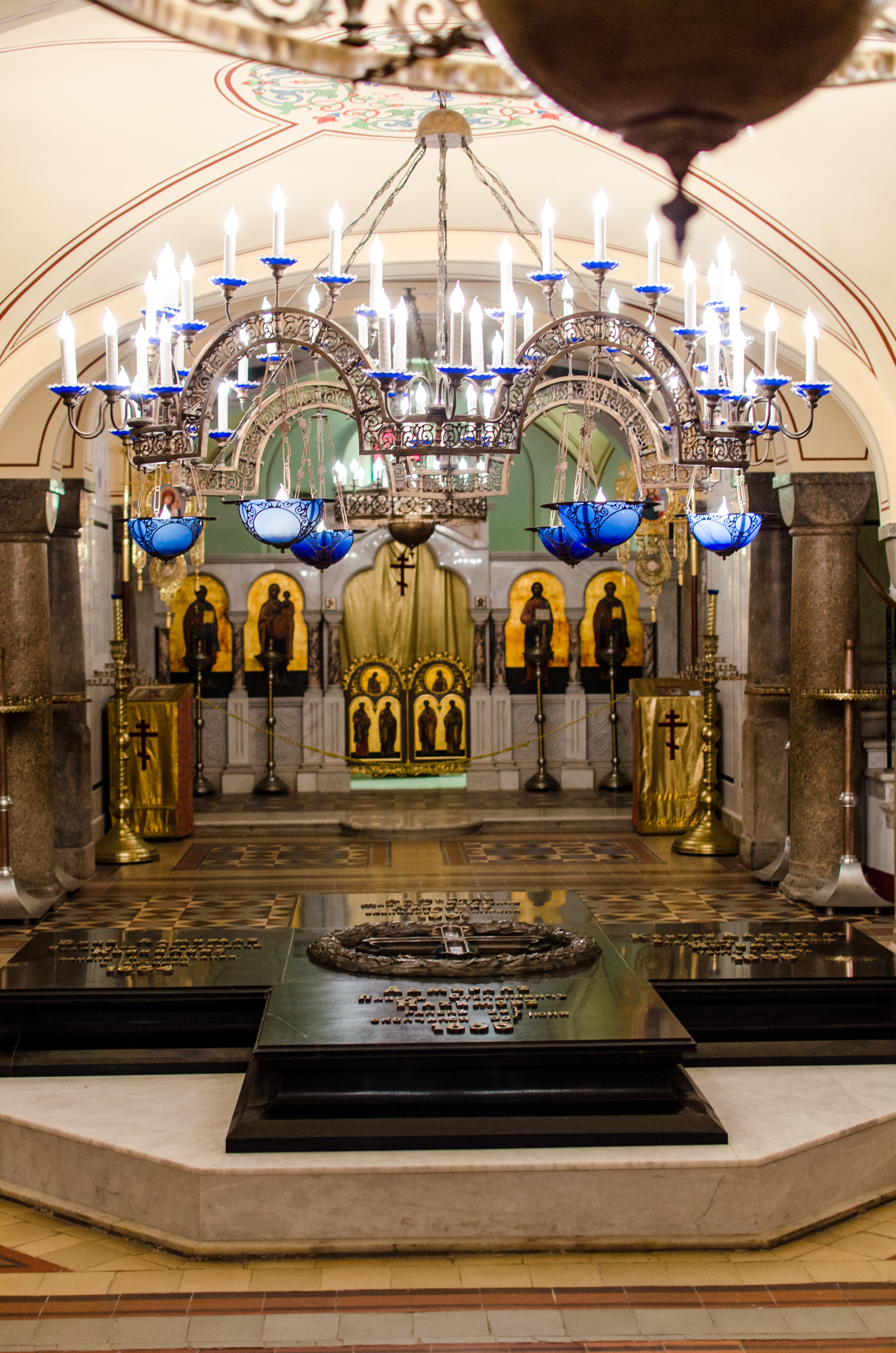

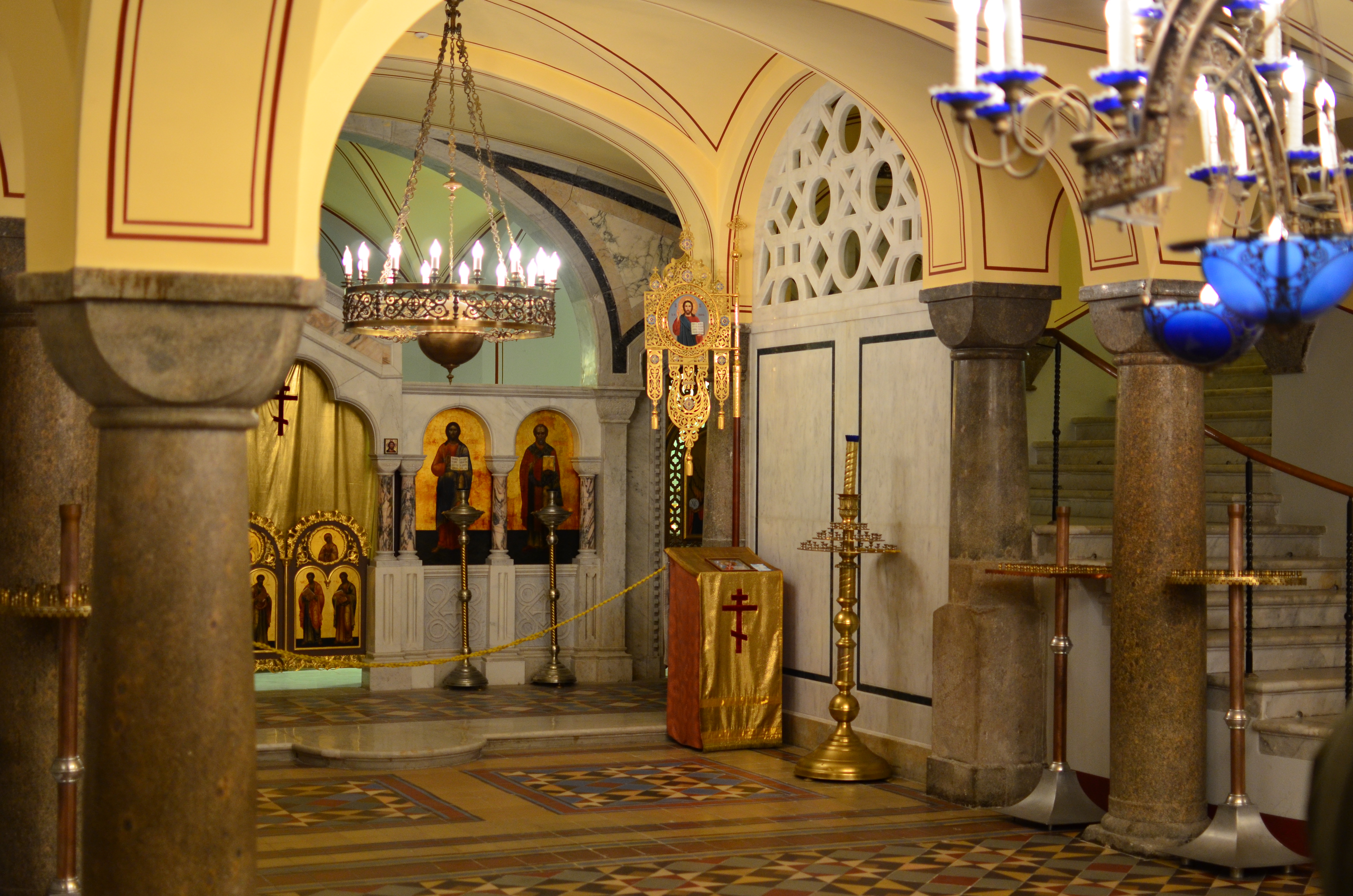

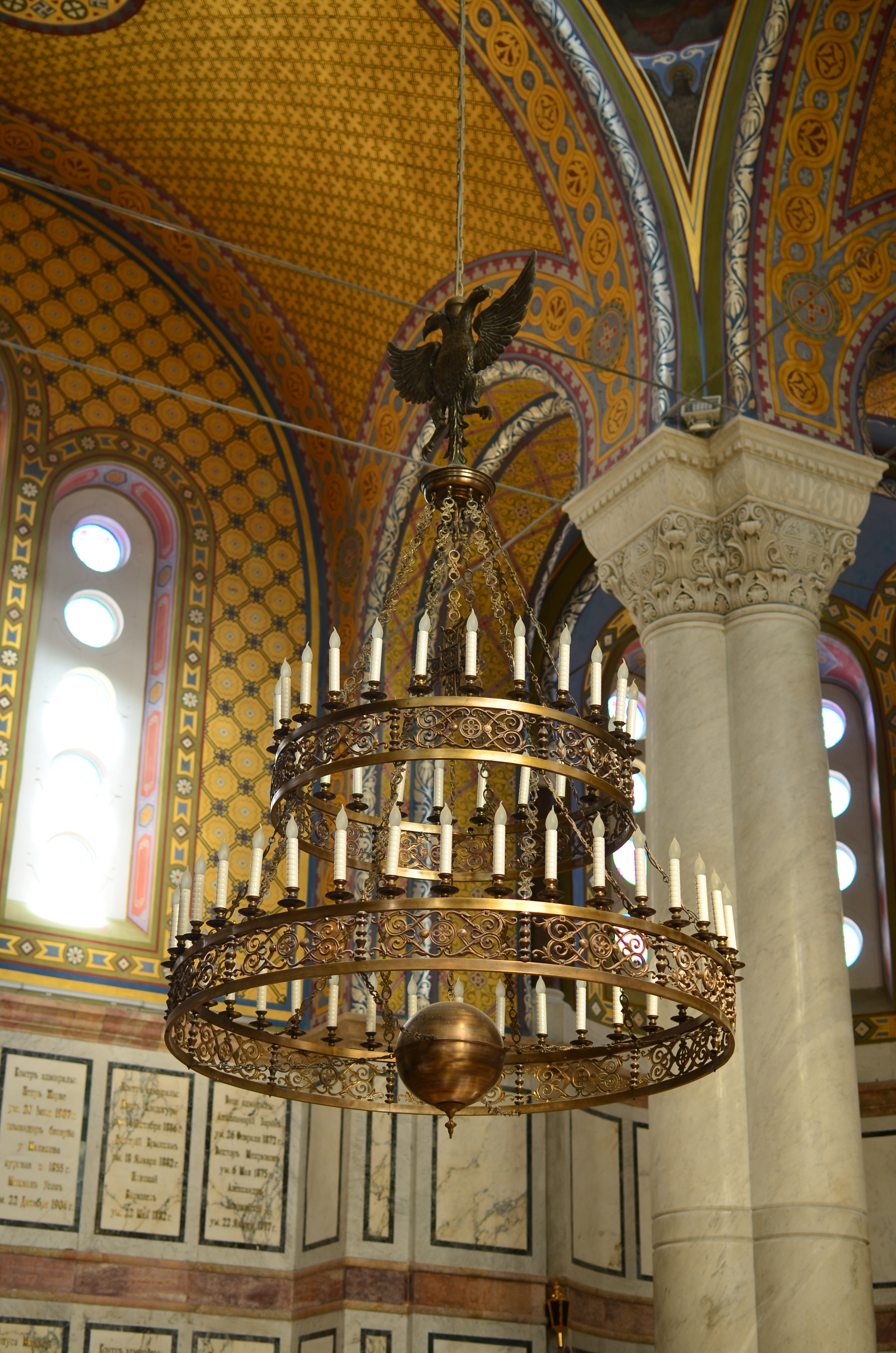

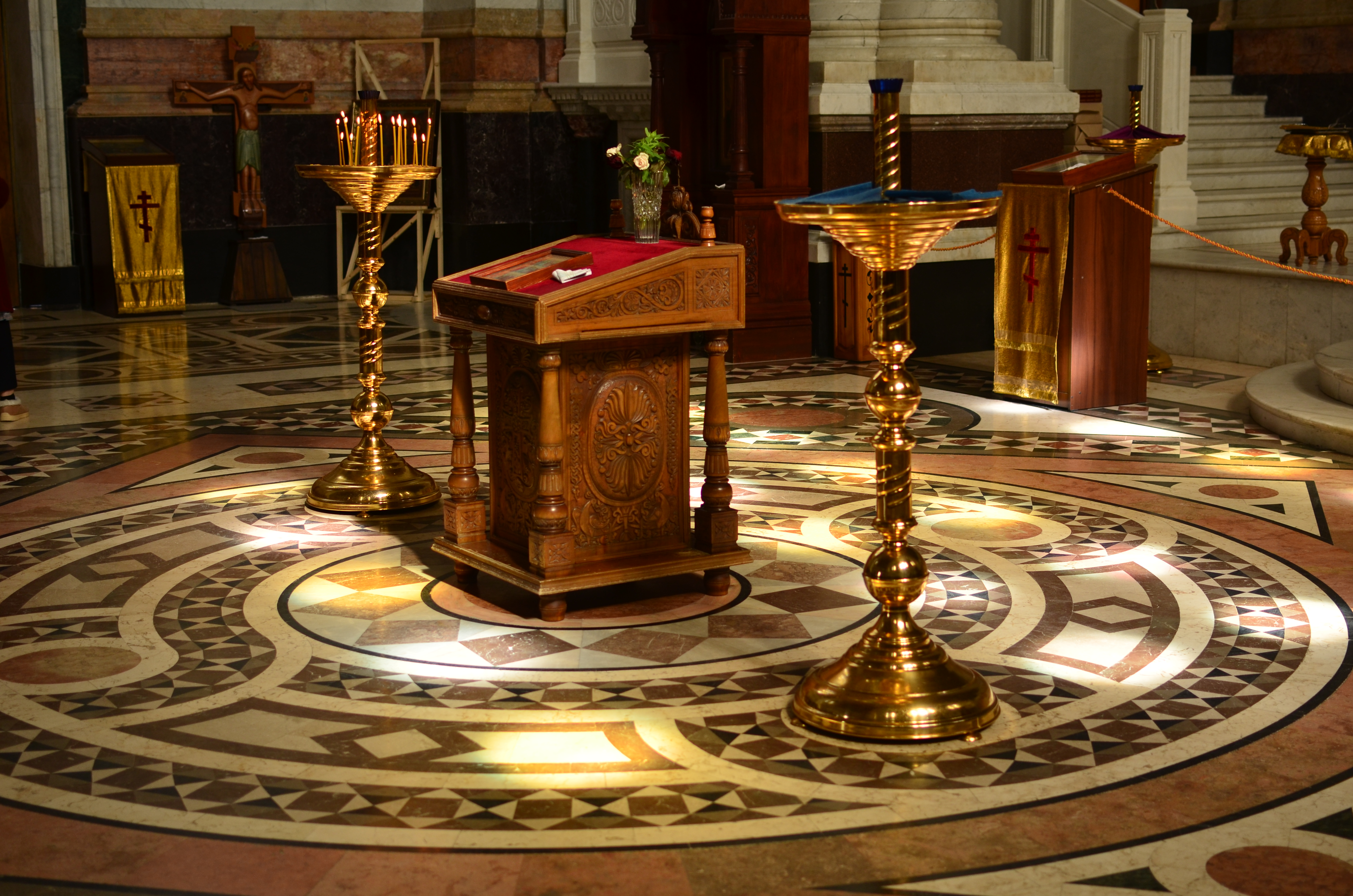

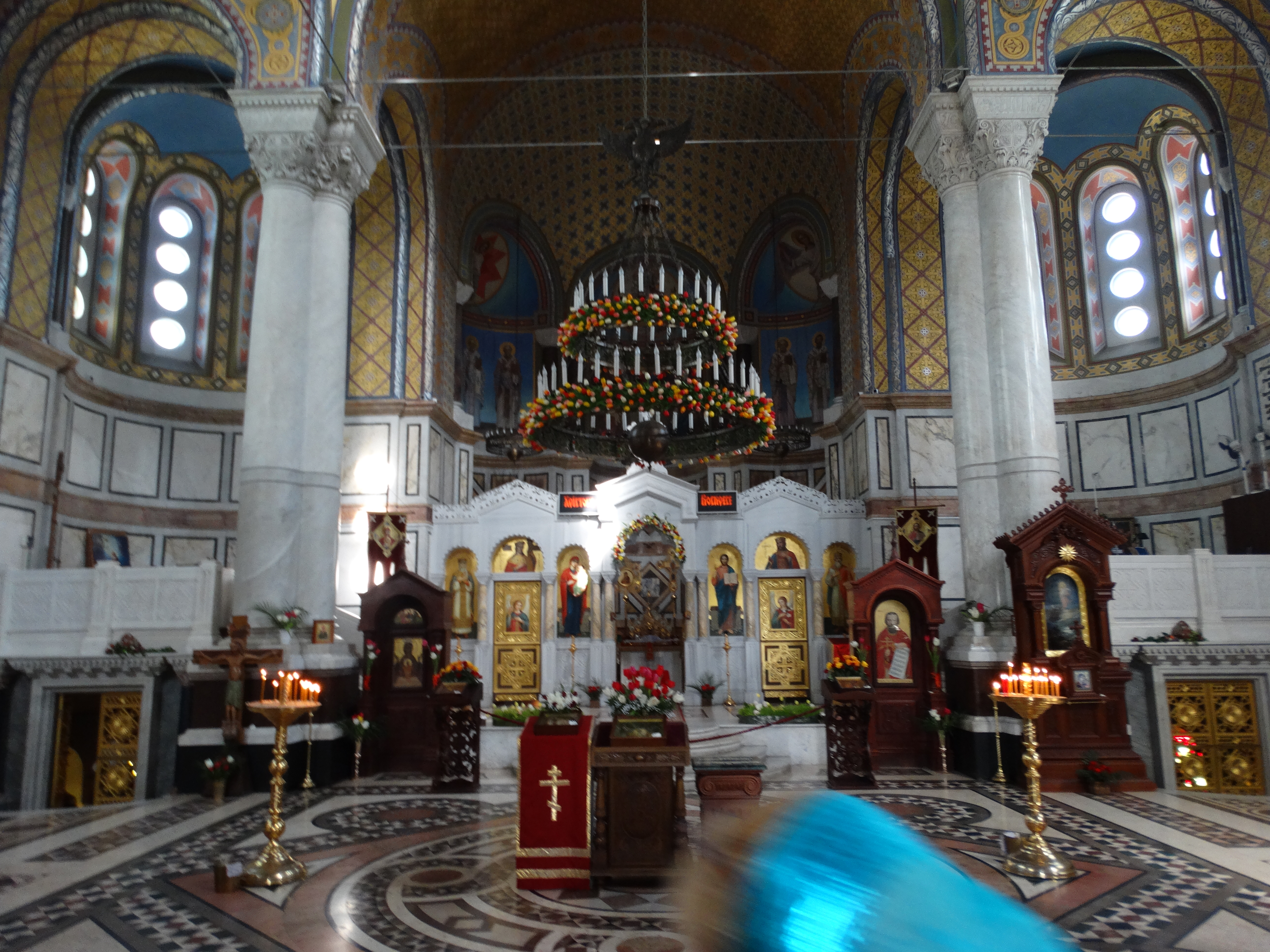

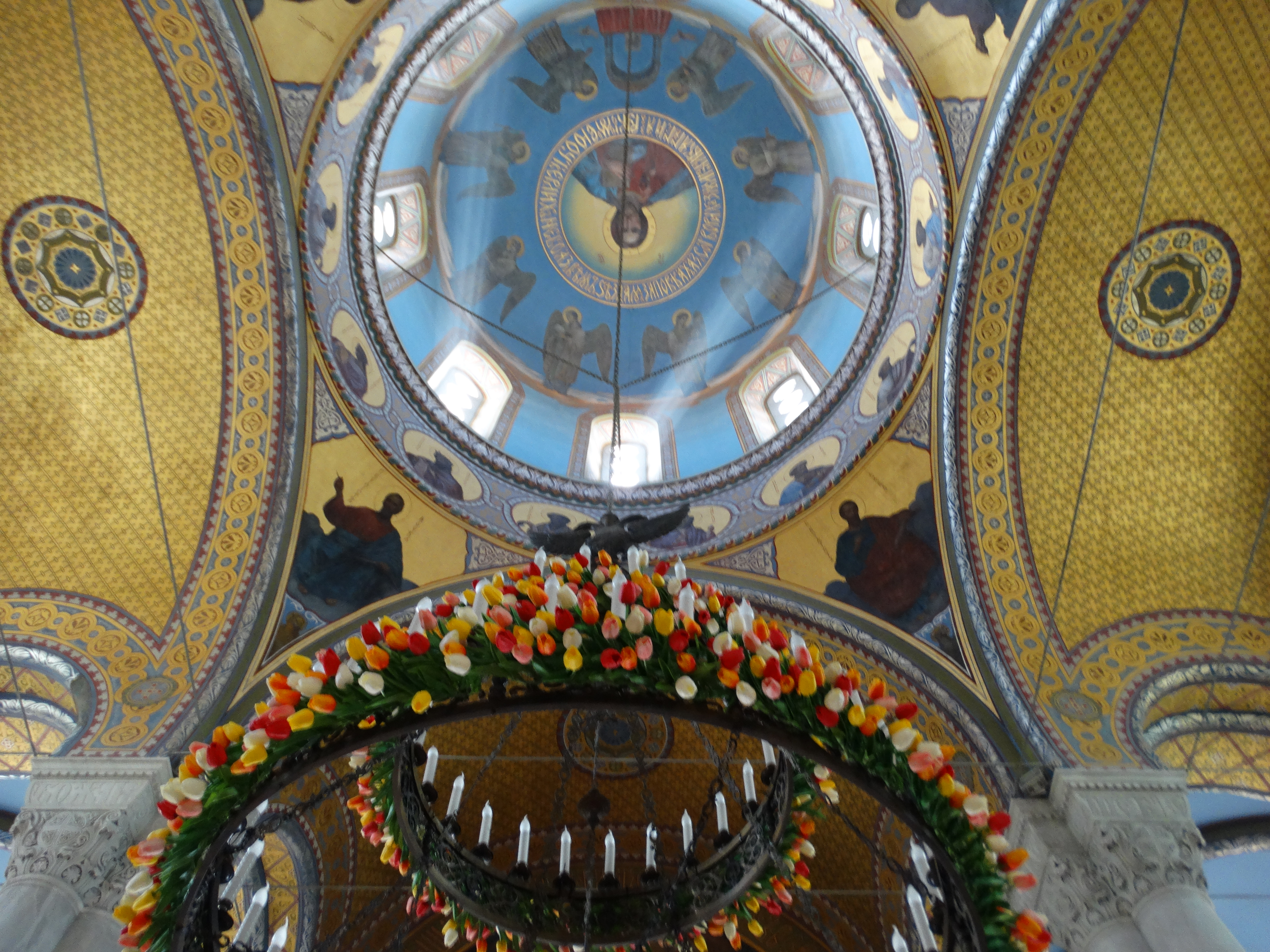

== See also ==
- Brotherhood Cemetery
- Chersonesus Cathedral
- Neo-Byzantine architecture in the Russian Empire
