= Joachim (Levitsky) =

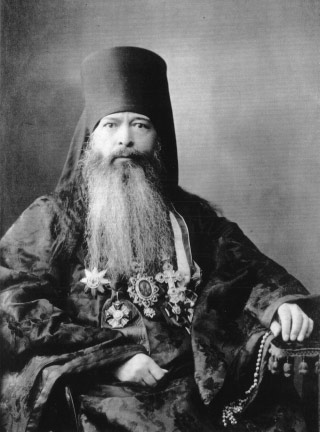
Archbishop Joachim

Archbishop Joachim of Nizhny Novgorod (born Ivan Ioakimovich Levitsky (Russian: Иван Акимович Леви́цкий, (30 March 1853 - c. 1921), was a Russian Orthodox bishop and religious writer allegedly martyred by local Bolsheviks by being crucified upside down on the royal doors of the iconostasis in St. Vladimir's Cathedral in Sevastopol. The exact date of his death is unclear, with dates ranging from 1918 to 1920 or even to "not later than April 1921" in various sources, and he is sometimes said merely to have "died at the hands of unknown bandits".

== Life ==
Levitsky was born in Kiev Province, and trained at the Kiev Spiritual School (uchilishche), the Kiev Seminary and the Kiev Spiritual Academy, completing a doctorate (kandidatura) in theology before being ordained a priest on 30 March 1879, his twenty-sixth birthday. In 1880 he was sent to teach at the Riga Seminary. After the death of several of his children in the 1880s, and his wife's death in 1886, he entered monastic orders, taking the monastic name Ioakim, and was elevated to the rank of archimandrite in 1893. At that same time, he was named rector of the Riga Seminary. On 14 January 1896, he was consecrated bishop in St. Isaac's Cathedral in St. Petersburg as vicarial bishop of the Baltic dicastery for the Kamenets-Podol eparchy. The following year he was named Bishop of Brest, vicarial bishop of the Lithuanian eparchy. In 1900 he was made ordinary Bishop of Grodno and Brest. In 1903 he was transferred to the eparchy of Orenburg and the Urals and in 1910, was named bishop of Nizhny Novgorod and Azama. Three years later, he was elevated to archiepiscopal dignity.

He was briefly imprisoned by the Provisional Government in 1917 for his monarchism, but was a member of the local council of the Russian Orthodox Church in 1917, which re-established the patriarchate and elected Tikhon as patriarch. He traveled to Moscow and never returned to Nizhny Novgorod, but retired from his archiepiscopate and was named administrator of the New Jerusalem Monastery on 22 March 1918. He was again arrested, this time by the Bolsheviks, in 1918, but later that year, was released and allowed to travel to Crimea where he lived in his son's dacha near Sevastopol. Sevastopol was seized by the White forces in the ensuing civil war and was not taken by the Red Army until November 1920. He was killed by unidentified bandits some time after his arrival in the city in 1918, as late as 1921 according to one source. A version of his death alleges he was crucified upside down by local bolsheviks but most sources attribute his death to 'unknown bandits' and make no reference to any crucifixion. A contemporary report from other Orthodox clergy at the time supports the idea that he was killed during a robbery, perhaps of the cathedral, although details are still scant.

== Veneration ==
Joachim is one of the New Martyrs of Russia (those who died for their faith in the Soviet Period), with his feast day observed on April 1.
