= Big Khan Mosque =

Sunni mosque in Bakhchisaray, Crimea

The Big Khan Mosque
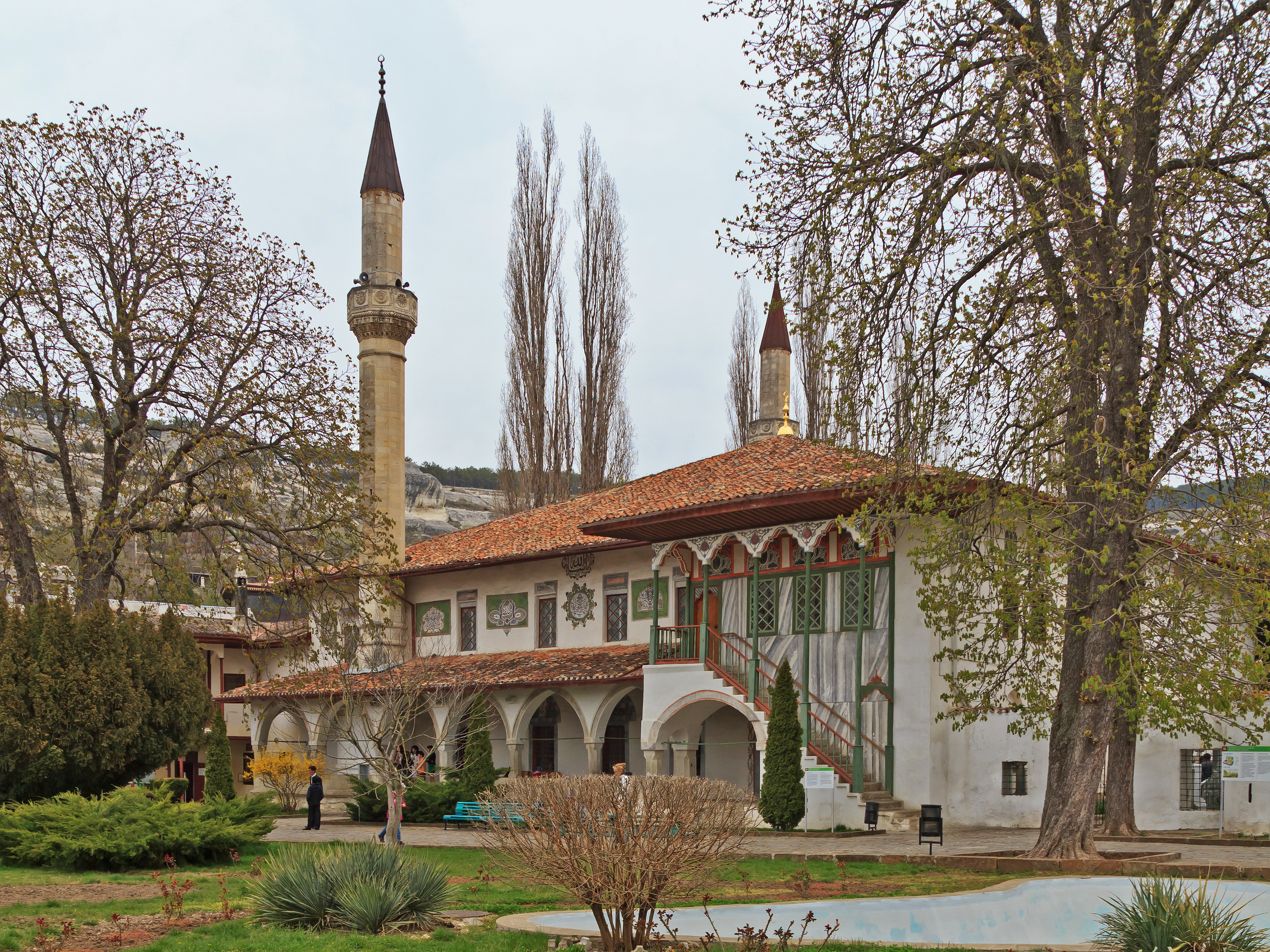

Religion
- Affiliation: Islam
- Rite: Sunni
- Status: Active

Location
- Location: Bakhchysarai
- Interactive map of The Big Khan Mosque
- Territory: (Autonomous Republic of Crimea) AR Crimea (de jure) (Autonomous Republic of Crimea) Republic of Crimea (de facto)
- Coordinates: 44°44′55.22″N 33°52′55.06″E

Architecture
- Type: Mosque
- Style: Ottoman architecture
- Completed: 1532

Specifications
- Minaret: 2
- Minaret height: 28 meters
- Materials: ...

Immovable Monument of National Significance of Ukraine
- Official name: Ханська мечеть (Khan Mosque)
- Type: Architecture
- Reference no.: 010077/8

The Big Khan Mosque (Crimean Tatar: Büyük Han Cami; Ukrainian: Велика ханська мечеть; Russian: Большая ханская мечеть; Turkish: Büyük Han Camii) is located in Bakhchysarai, Crimea, and is part of the Bakhchysarai Palace. It is one of the largest mosques in Crimea and one of the first buildings of the Khan's Palace. The mosque was built in 1532 by Sahib I Giray and bore his name in the 17th century.

== History ==
The mosque consists of a three-aisle square prayer hall covered with a hipped roof, a narthex and porticos facing east and west. Two symmetrical octagonal minarets rise through the porticos; they are twenty-eight meters high and have conical caps and finials. A domed wudu kiosk of square shape is attached to the northeastern corner of the mosque. It is believed that a madrasah built by Khan Arslan Giray in 1750 used to adjoin the eastern wall. The mosque is entered from a portal facing north. Inside, a balcony is attached to three of the four walls, part of which is sectioned off for the Khan's lodge. Scholars argue that the mosque was originally roofed with domes of various sizes.

In 1736 the mosque was damaged by fire and later restored during the reign of Khan Selameta Giray.

== See also ==
- Religion in Crimea
- List of mosques in Europe
