= Bilohirsk =

Bilohirsk Білогірськ (Ukrainian) Къарасувбазар (Crimean Tatar) Белогорск (Russian) Belogorsk
- City (de jure), Town of district significance (de facto)

Ukrainian transcription(s)
  - Ukrainian National: Bilohirsk
  - ALA-LC: Bilohirsʹk
  - ISO 9: Bìlogìrsʹk

Russian transcription(s)
  - ISO 9: Belogorsk
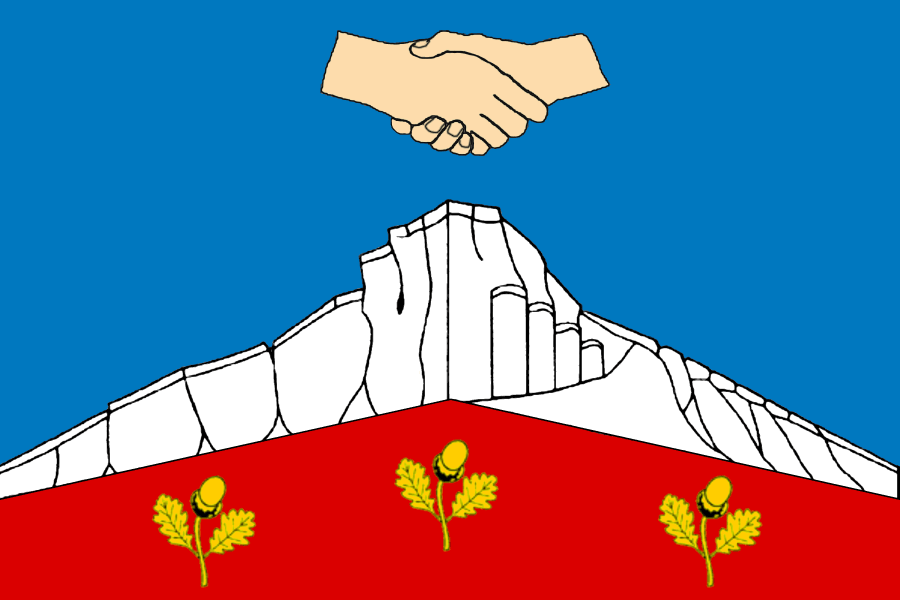
- Flag Coat of arms
- Etymology: white mountains (for Bilohirsk, Belogorsk)
- Interactive map of Bilohirsk
- Location of Bilohirsk within Crimea
- Coordinates: 45°3′16″N 34°36′8″E
- Country: Ukraine (occupied by Russia)
- Autonomous republic: Crimea (de jure)
- Raion: Bilohirsk Raion (de jure)
- Federal subject: Crimea (de facto)

Area
  - Total: 5.42 km^{2} (2.09 sq mi)
- Elevation: 180 m (590 ft)

Population (2014)
  - Total: 16,354 (2,014 Census).
  - Density: 3,398.52/km^{2} (8,802.1/sq mi)
- Time zone: UTC+03:00 (MSK)
- Postal code: 97600 — 97609
- Area code: +7-36559
- Website: http://belogorsk.crimea.ua/

Bilohirsk (until 1944 – Karasubazar, Ukrainian: Білогірськ; Russian: Белогорск, romanized: Belogorsk, Crimean Tatar: Qarasuvbazar/Къарасувбазар) is a city and the administrative centre of Bilohirsk Raion, one of the raions (districts) of the Autonomous Republic of Crimea, which is recognised by a majority of countries as part of Ukraine, but is occupied by Russia.

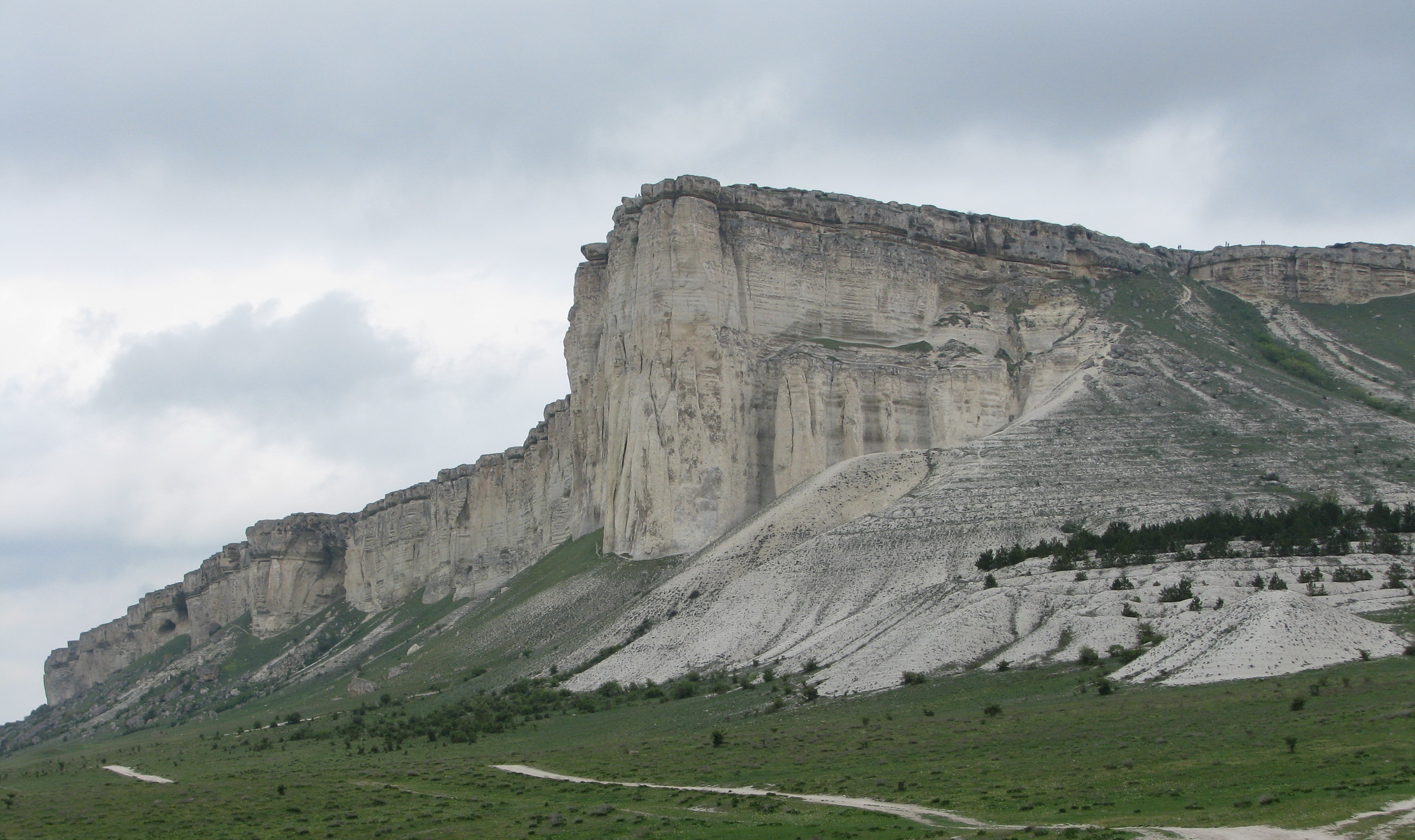
Aq Qaya

== Geography ==
The city is located 25 miles east-northeast of Simferopol on the Biiuk Karasu river. The city's both Russian and Ukrainian names literally are translated as "white mountains", and the Crimean Tatar name Qarasuvbazar means "bazaar on the Karasu river".

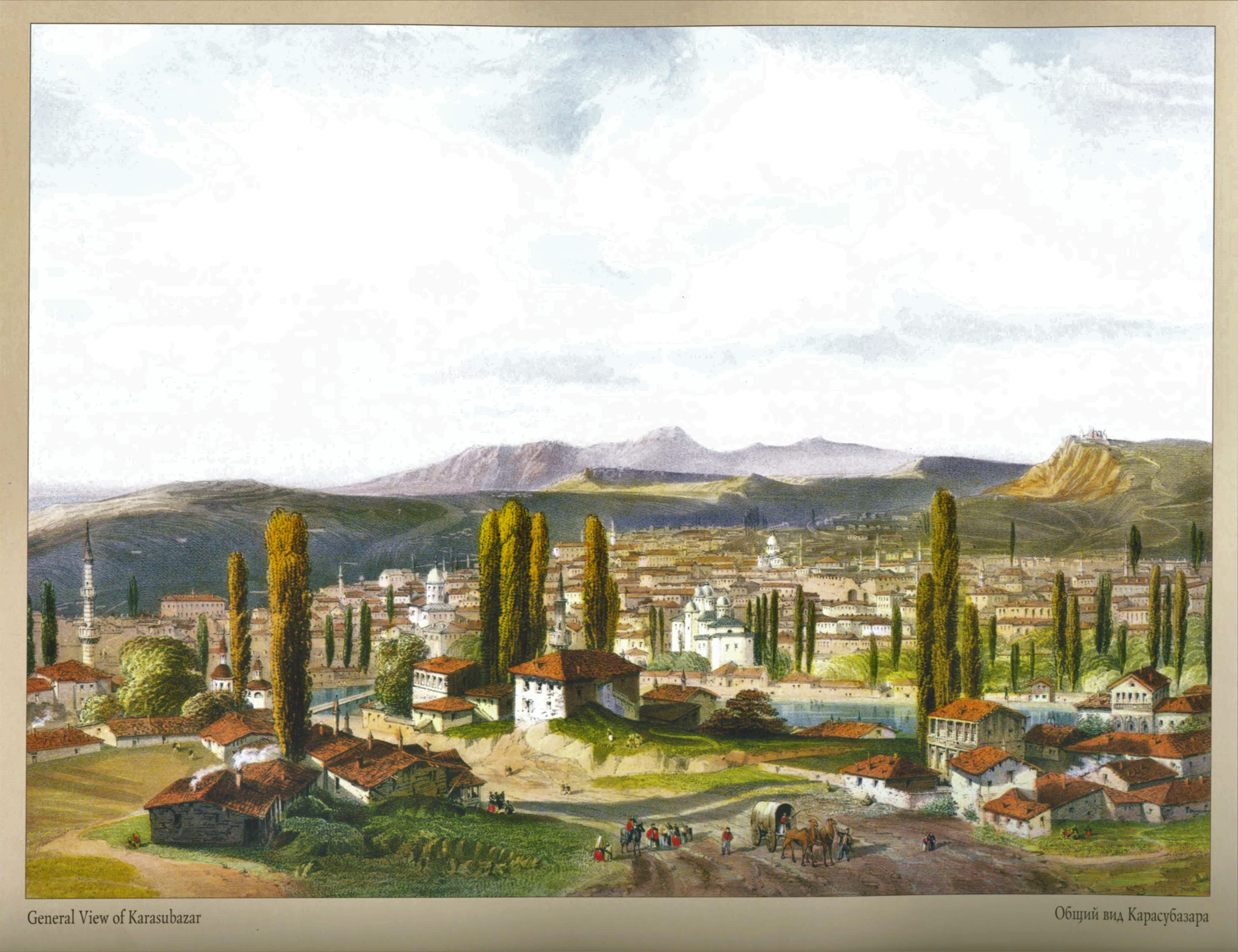
The city in 1856, by Carlo Bossoli.

The site is low, but the town is surrounded by hills, which afford protection from the north wind. The town has a characteristic Crimean Tatar atmosphere. Placed on the high road between Simferopol and Kerch, and in the midst of a country rich in cereal land, vineyards and gardens, Qarasubazar ('black water market') used to be a chief seat of commercial activity in Crimea; including a large slave market but it is gradually declining in importance, though still a considerable centre for the export of fruit.

The caves of Akkaya close by give evidence of early occupation of the area.

=== Climate ===
Climate data for Bilohirsk (1981–2010)
Month	Jan	Feb	Mar	Apr	May	Jun	Jul	Aug	Sep	Oct	Nov	Dec	Year
Mean daily maximum °C (°F)	4.1 (39.4)	4.8 (40.6)	8.9 (48.0)	15.7 (60.3)	21.4 (70.5)	25.4 (77.7)	28.3 (82.9)	28.0 (82.4)	22.8 (73.0)	16.7 (62.1)	10.4 (50.7)	5.8 (42.4)	16.0 (60.8)
Daily mean °C (°F)	0.1 (32.2)	0.3 (32.5)	3.8 (38.8)	9.8 (49.6)	15.1 (59.2)	19.2 (66.6)	21.8 (71.2)	21.2 (70.2)	16.2 (61.2)	10.7 (51.3)	5.4 (41.7)	1.8 (35.2)	10.5 (50.9)
Mean daily minimum °C (°F)	−3.5 (25.7)	−3.7 (25.3)	−0.6 (30.9)	4.3 (39.7)	8.7 (47.7)	12.9 (55.2)	15.3 (59.5)	14.5 (58.1)	10.1 (50.2)	5.6 (42.1)	1.3 (34.3)	−1.7 (28.9)	5.3 (41.5)
Average precipitation mm (inches)	31.2 (1.23)	31.9 (1.26)	39.2 (1.54)	36.4 (1.43)	39.7 (1.56)	66.2 (2.61)	51.7 (2.04)	58.1 (2.29)	37.0 (1.46)	37.4 (1.47)	42.8 (1.69)	41.0 (1.61)	512.6 (20.18)
Average precipitation days (≥ 1.0 mm)	7.8	7.1	7.5	6.1	6.2	7.2	5.3	5.4	5.1	5.9	7.1	8.1	78.8
Average relative humidity (%)	83.0	79.3	74.4	68.3	67.1	66.9	64.2	65.6	70.8	77.1	81.3	83.0	73.4
Source: World Meteorological Organization

== History ==
In Crimea, it was the capital of a separate kaimakamlik. In the 15th century, it became a significant city and by the end of the 16th century, it surpassed all the cities of the peninsula in terms of population.

Since 1623, it was called Karasubazar (which translates from Crimean Tatar as "market on black water"). The Zaporozhian Cossacks conquered Karasubazar three times (in 1624, 1628, and 1630). In 1675, a group of Zaporozhian Cossacks led by the koshevoy otaman Sirk launched a raid on Karasubazar and liberated a thousand prisoners.

In 1736, after the Russian field marshal Minich occupied and burned the Khan's capital of Bakhchisarai, the Crimean Khan Fetih Geray moved the capital to Karasubazar, and from 1737, the city was occupied by Russian troops under the leadership of General Douglas.

In 1772, the Karasubazar Treaty was signed in the city, which formally defined the status of the Crimean Khanate as an independent state.

When in 1736 Khan Fetih Giray was driven by the Russian Empire from Bakhchysarayi, he settled at Karasubazar, but next year the town was captured, plundered and burned by the Russian army.

In 1777, a Russian detachment led by A. Suvorov defeated Ottoman-Tatar forces in the vicinity of Karasubazar.

From 1784, Karasubazar was the center of the main administration of the newly annexed Novoprisoedinyonny Krai. Since ancient times, it was a multicultural city, and until the 1770s, a significant part of its population was Armenian, which was one of the centers for the creation of Armenian manuscripts.

According to the census of 1897, the population increased to 12,968 people (6,603 men and 6,365 women), of which 2,515 were Orthodox, 3,191 were Jewish, and 6,330 were Muslim.

Since 1921, it has been a district center, and since 1926, it has been a city.

Retreating NKVD shot a number of local people in the streets in 1941. Qarasuvbazar was occupied by the German army from 1941 to 1944 during World War II. During the occupation, the Germans executed the town's Jews in an anti-tank trench.

After the deportation of the Crimean Tatars, the town was renamed Belogorsk per Stalinist detatarization policy.

== Notable persons ==
- Alexander Ponomarenko
