= Bakhchysarai Cave Monastery =

Place in Crimea

- Ukrainian: Успенський монастир (Бахчисарай)
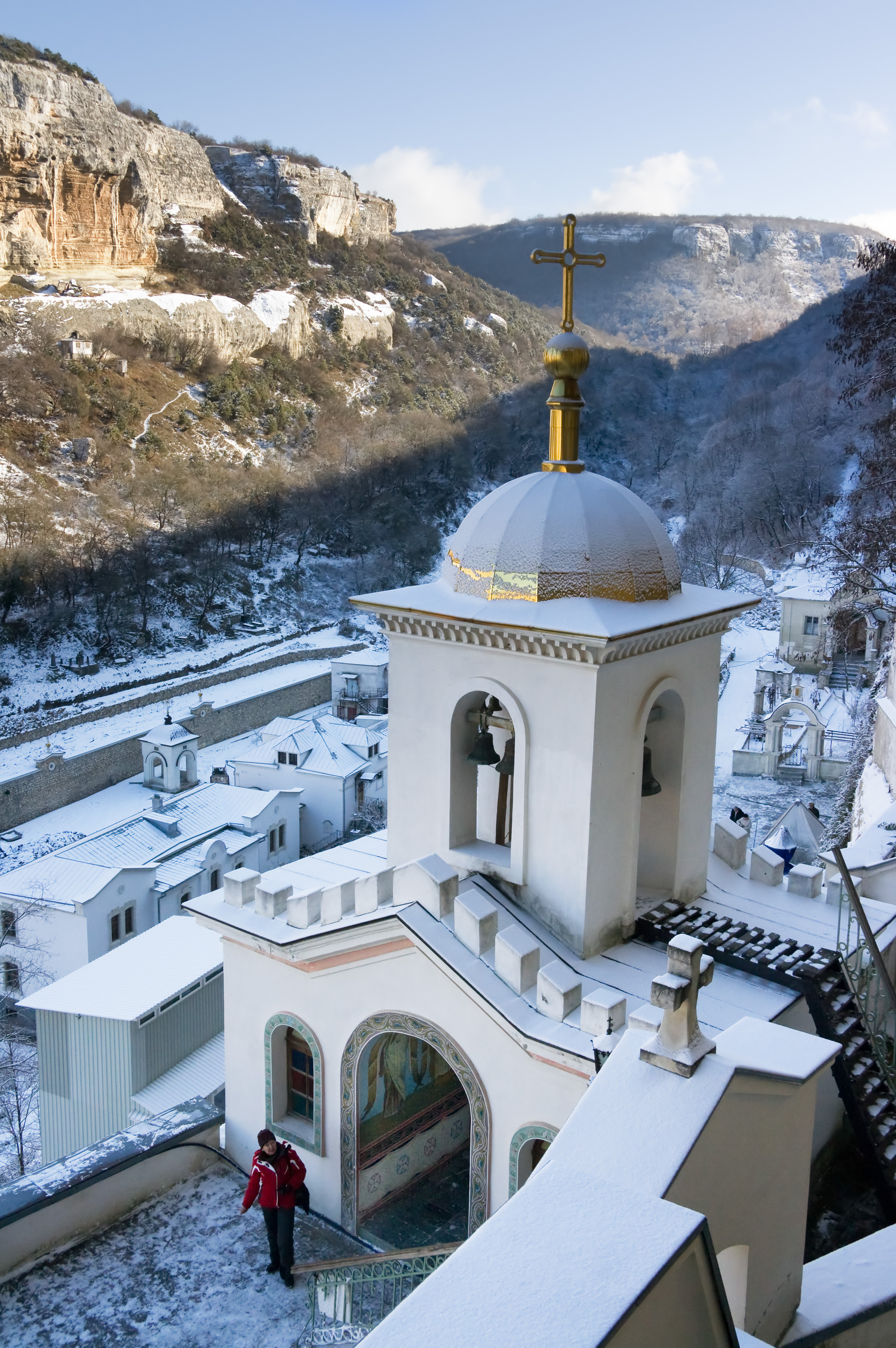
- Uspensky Cave Monastery

- Location within Crimea Bakhchysarai Cave Monastery (Ukraine)

General information
- Location: Bakhchysarai, Ukraine, Ukraine
- Coordinates: 44°44′40.75″N 33°54′35.60″E
- Owner: Ukrainian Orthodox Church (Moscow Patriarchate)

Immovable Monument of National Significance of Ukraine
- Official name: Комплекс Успенського печерного монастиря (Complex of the Dormition Cave Monastery)
- Type: Archaeology
- Reference no.: 010006-Н

Immovable Monument of National Significance of Ukraine
- Official name: Печерний Успенський монастир (Dormition Cave Monastery)
- Type: Architecture
- Reference no.: 010081

The Dormition Monastery of the Caves (Russian: Успенский пещерный монастырь; Ukrainian: Успенський печерний монастир), otherwise known as Bakhchysarai Cave Monastery, or Uspensky Cave Monastery is located in Crimea, near the town of Bakhchysarai. It is a cave monastery carved out of a cliff, thought to have been founded in the 8th century.

== History ==
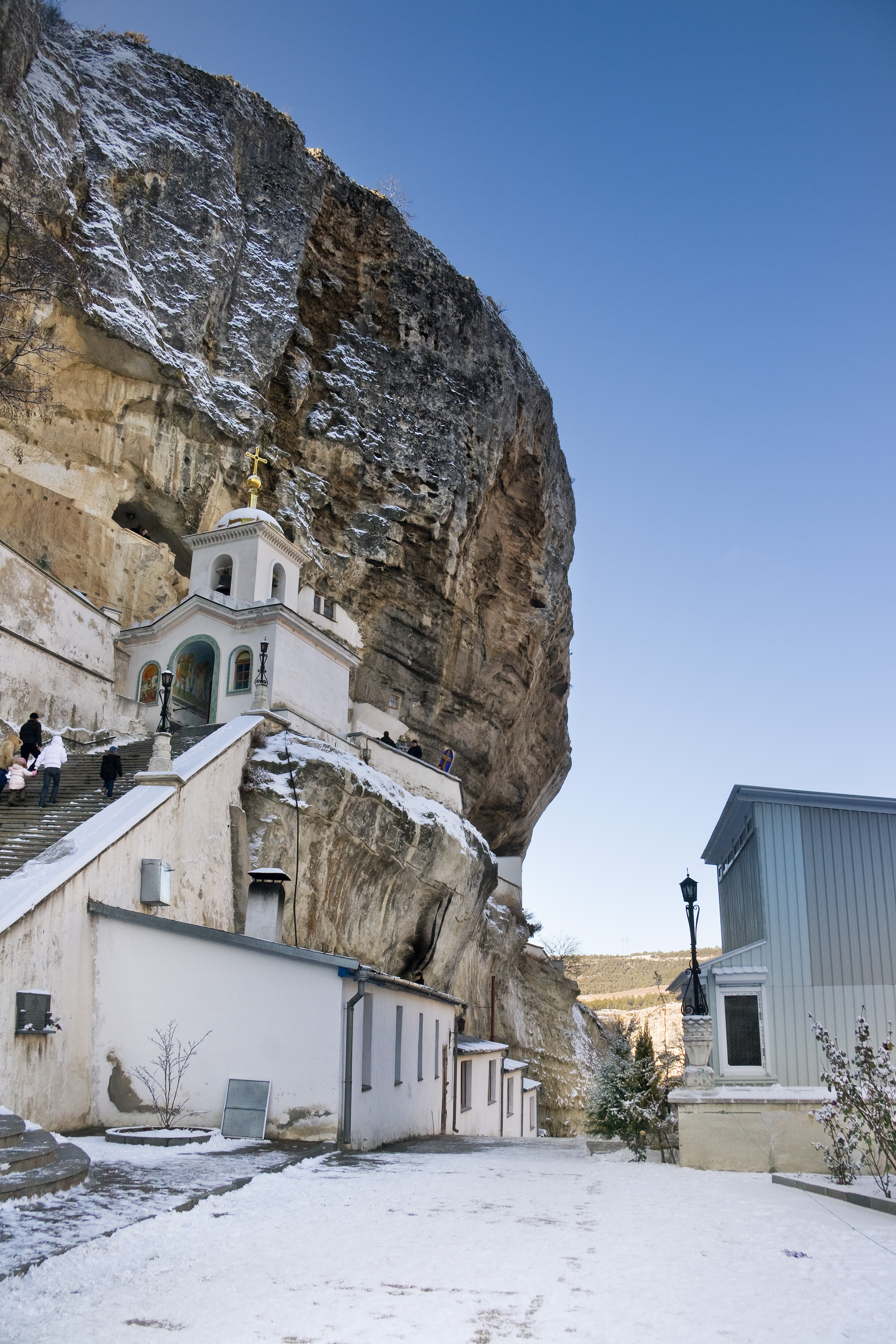
Uspensky Cave Monastery

The date of the monastery's foundation is disputed, although local monks assert that it originated as early as the 8th century but was abandoned when Byzantium lost its hold on the region. The current monastic establishment dates back to the 15th century, founded by monks from the monastery at Kyiv-Pechersk Lavra. The monastery has been built by carving out the building into the walls of the cliffs themselves. The buildings are whitewashed with golden domes.

The monastery became an important hub of Eastern Orthodox Christianity between the 15th and 18th centuries, accommodating those fleeing from Muslim persecution in Greece. The monastery fell into a period of decline around 1778, due to Eviction of Christians from the Crimea. The icon of the Mother of God was taken by the Greeks from the church to another church Mariupol, where it remained until 1918, at which point all trace of it was lost.

In 1921 the monastery was closed by the Soviet government due to laws against religion. After the dissolution of the Soviet Union and Ukrainian independence the monastery was restored, monks returned and it was reopened to the public in 1993.

== See also ==
- Inkerman Cave Monastery - another cave monastery in Crimea
