= Brotherhood Cemetery =

Military cemetery in Sevastopol

Coordinates: 44°38′10″N 33°33′21″E

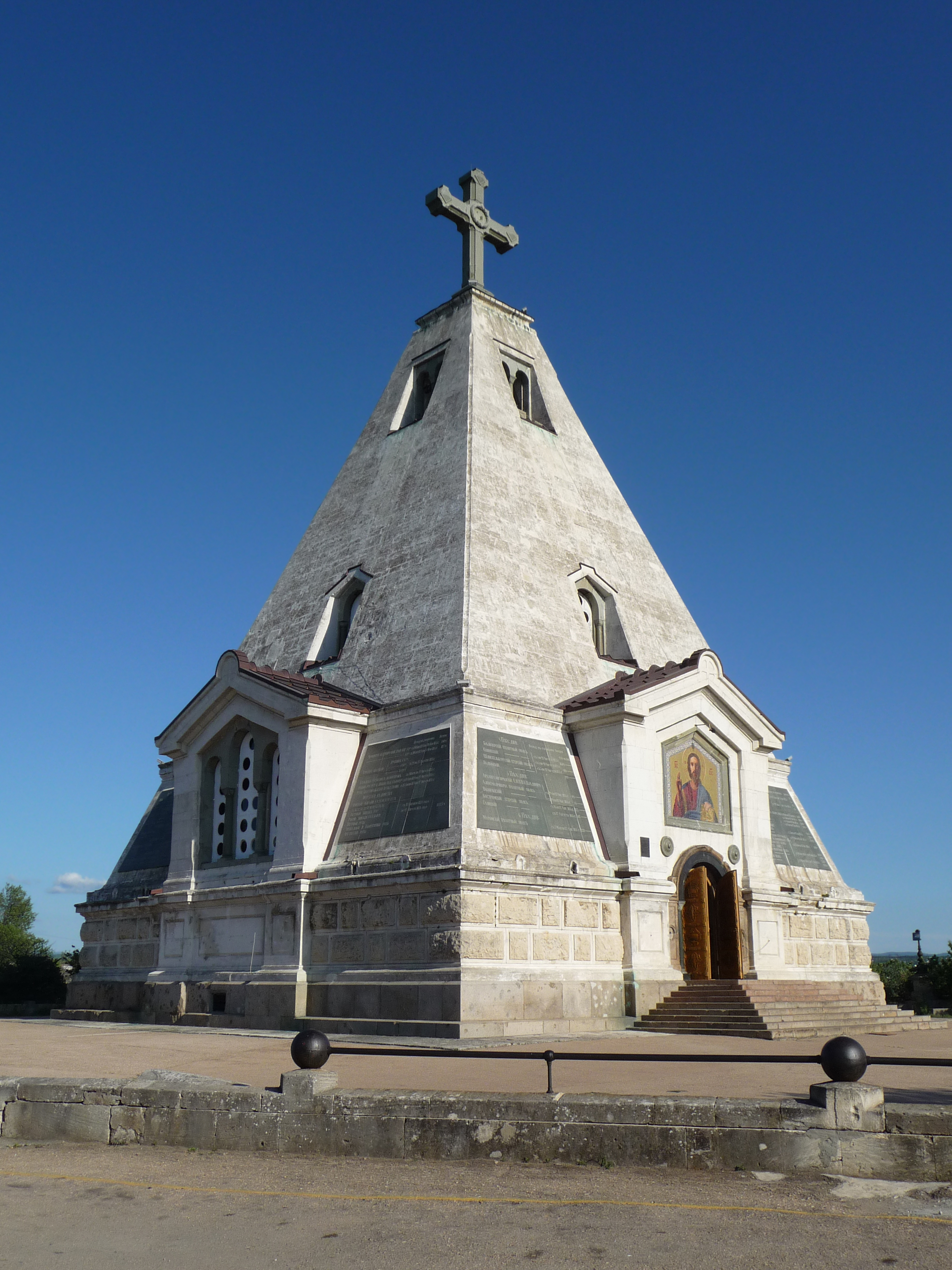
Saint Nicholas Church at the Brotherhood Cemetery

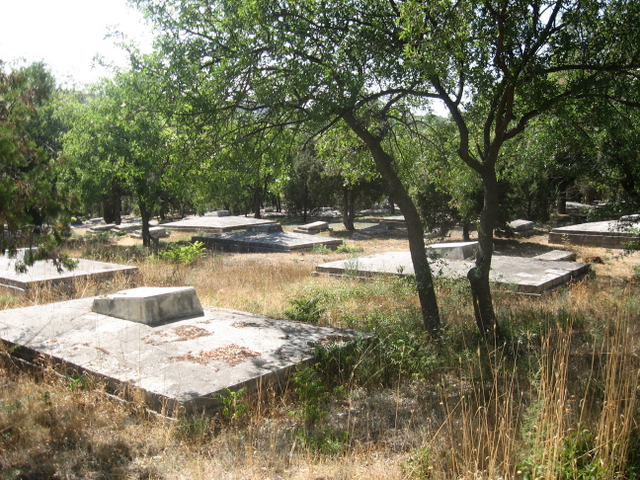
Brotherhood graves

The Brotherhood Cemetery (Russian: Братское кладбище, romanized: Bratskoe kladbishche; Ukrainian: Братське кладовище, romanized: Bratske kladovyshche) is an Imperial Russian military cemetery in Sevastopol. It was founded in 1854 as a temporary burial place for Russian soldiers and officers who were killed during the first siege of Sevastopol.

Three burial sites were created according to order of Admiral Vladimir Kornilov near the northern fort of Sevastopol. Ten the cemeteries were united because of severe casualties among the defenders of the besieged Russian city. It is estimated that 100,000 to 127,000 Russian military men were buried there.

The cemetery has 472 collective and 130 individual graves. The collective graves each contain 50–100 or more bodies of soldiers. The individual graves contain the bodies of officers.

Famous Russian military commanders buried there are:

- Eduard Ivanovich Totleben
- Stepan Khrulyov
- Mikhail Dmitrievich Gorchakov.

In 1870, in the upper part of the cemetery hill, a pyramidal Orthodox Saint Nicholas church was built. The inner part of the church is covered with plates containing the names of Russian officers killed during the siege. The outer walls of the church contain plates with the names of all regiments and military units who defended the city, with information about dates and casualties in each unit.

The cemetery hill was used as a command post by the 4th defence sector of the besieged Soviet troops during the second siege of Sevastopol (1941–1942). The cemetery was severely bombarded and then turned into a battleground between the Red Army and Nazi Germany troops. Saint Nicholas Church and the cemetery itself were partially destroyed.

After the fighting the cemetery was expanded with the graves of Soviet soldiers killed in Second World War actions and killed with the sinking of the Soviet battleship Novorossiysk in 1955.

== See also ==
- Admirals' Burial Vault
