= Inkerman Cave Monastery =

Place in Sevastopol, Crimea

- Ukrainian: Інкерманський печерний монастир
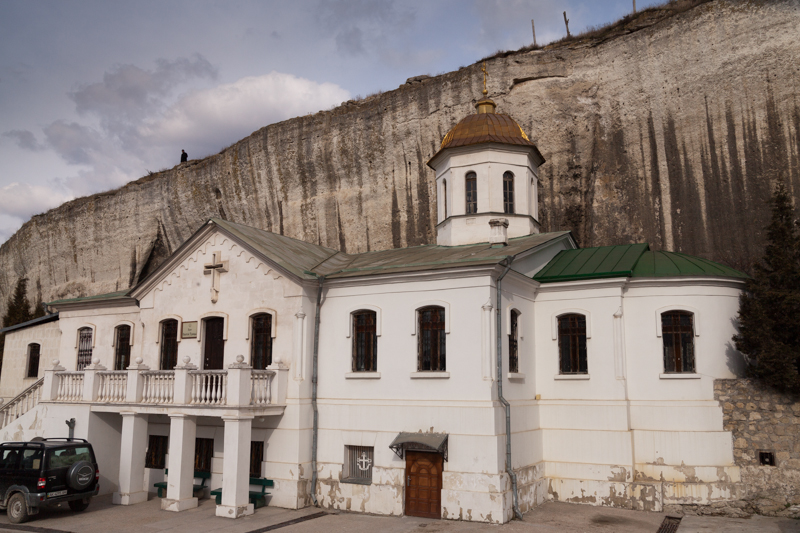
- One of the Inkerman Cave Monastery chapels in 2012.

- Location within Sevastopol Inkerman Cave Monastery (Crimea) Inkerman Cave Monastery (Ukraine)
- Interactive map of the Inkerman Cave Monastery area

General information
- Location: Inkerman, Crimea, * Ukraine (de jure): Russia (de facto)
- Coordinates: 44°36′13.32″N 33°36′26.72″E
- Construction started: 1850
- Owner: Russian Orthodox Church

Immovable Monument of National Significance of Ukraine
- Official name: Фортеця Каламіта та Печерний монастир в Інкермані (Kalamita Fortress and the Cave Monastery in Inkerman)
- Type: Architecture
- Reference no.: 270022

The Inkerman Monastery of St. Clement (Russian: Инкерманский Свято-Климентовский пещерный монастырь, romanized: Inkermanskiy Svyato-Klimentovskiy peshchernyy monastyr'; Ukrainian: Інкерманський печерний монастир, romanized: Inkermanskyi pechernyi monastyr) is a cave monastery in a cliff rising near the mouth of the Black River, in the city of Inkerman, de facto administered as part of the sea port of Sevastopol but de jure belonging to the Autonomous Republic of Crimea.

== History ==
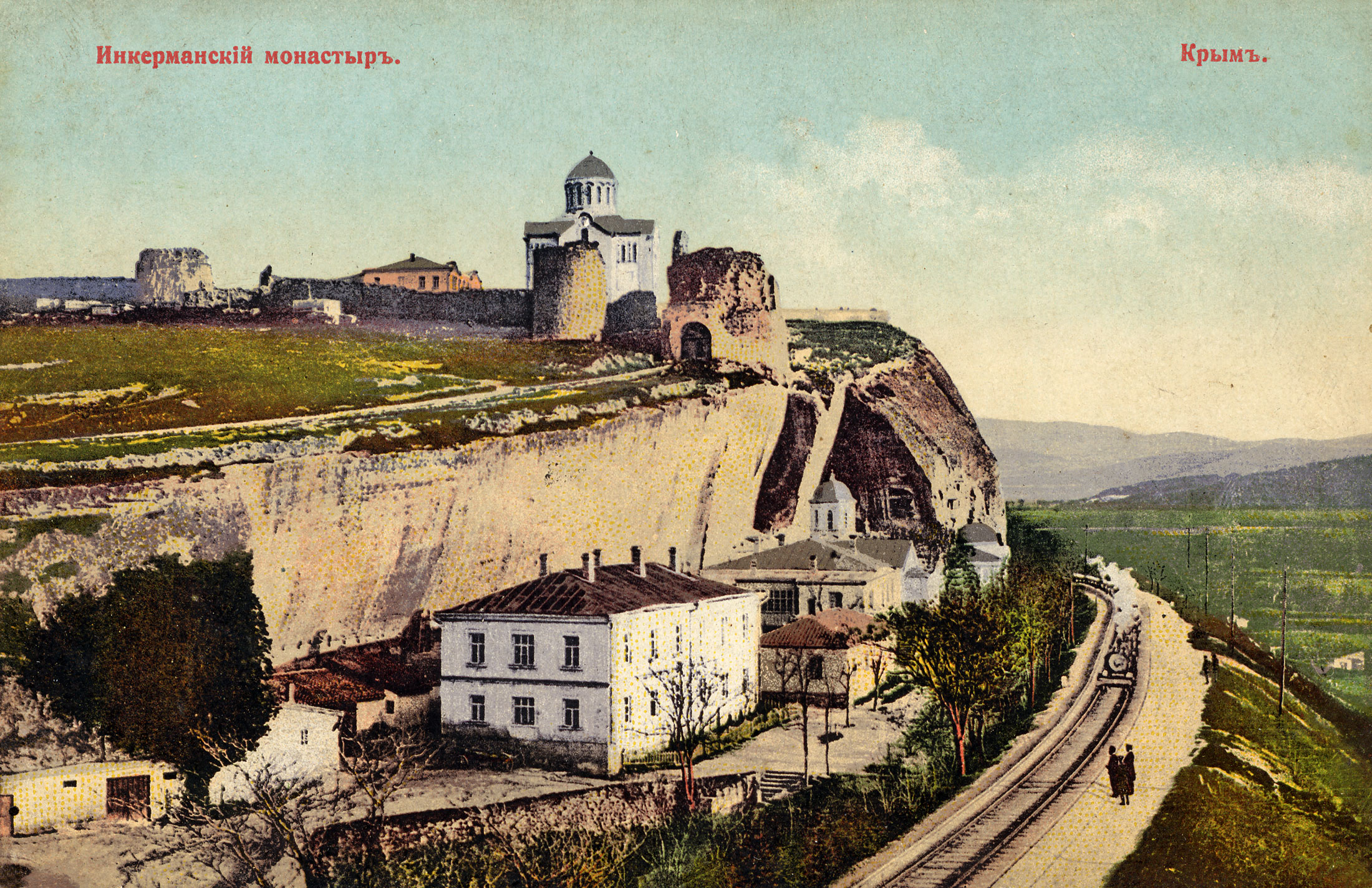
A postcard from the 1910s

It was founded in 1850 on the site of a medieval Byzantine monastery where the relics of St. Clement were supposedly kept before their removal to San Clemente by Saints Cyril and Methodius. The early Christians are supposed to have kept the relics in a grotto which could be visited only on the anniversary of his death. William Rubruck described it as a church "built by the hands of angels".

The Byzantine monastery, probably founded in the 8th century by icon-venerators fleeing persecution in their homeland, had eight chapels of several storeys and an inn accessed by a stairway. The caves of Inkerman were surveyed by Peter Simon Pallas in 1793 and looted by the British in the 1850s.

The Russians added two churches, commemorating the Borki Incident (1895) and the Crimean War (1905). The monastery was damaged by the 1927 Crimean earthquakes and was closed between 1931 and 1991. During World War II the caves housed the officers of a Soviet army defending Sevastopol. Several churches were taken down by the Soviets.

In 2019, weekly services were resumed in the Church of Clement of Rome with the blessing of Archimandrite Kallinik (Chernyshyov), the dean of the monasteries of the Crimean diocese of the Russian Orthodox Church.

== See also ==
- Bakhchysarai Cave Monastery
