= Aq Qaya =

Rock in Crimea

Coordinates: 45.106°N 34.623°E

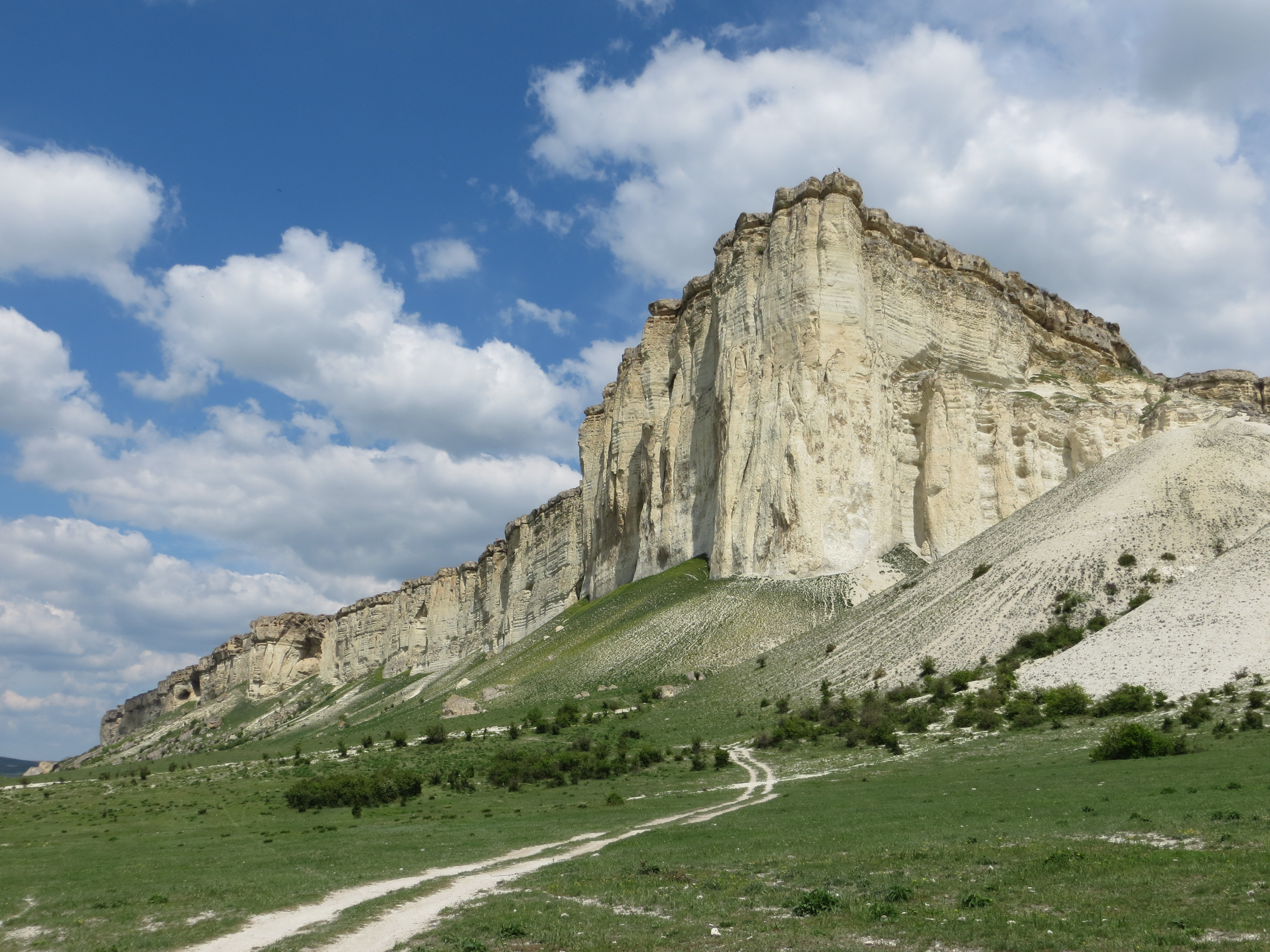
- Aq-Qaya rock in Qarasuvbazar

Geography
- Location: Ukraine

Aq Qaya (Crimean Tatar: Aq Qaya; Ukrainian: Ак-Кая; Russian: Белая скала) is a rock in Crimea, situated near the village of Belaya Skala/Ak-Kaya of the Bilohirsk Raion.

The vertical white rocky wall rises above the valley of the Biyuk-Karasu river. The height above sea level is 325 m, the height difference between the valley and the top of the rock is 100 m.

The name Aq Qaya is translated from Crimean Tatar language as White Rock (Crimean Tatar: aq — white, Crimean Tatar: qaya — rock).

Aq Qaya was created as a result of erosion and weathering of chalk and Paleogene limestones and sandstones — a clear example of the Cuesta relief. In the upper part of the rock weathering created pillars, grottoes, oval niches. At the bottom of the rocks, weathering products accumulate such as slides, piles of boulders, erosion hollows. In some places, erosion is restrained by thickets of wild rose and hornbeam.

Since 1981, it is a natural monument of national importance.
