= Southern Coast (Crimea) =

Geographic region in southern Crimea

Simeiz, a resort on the Southern Coast

The Southern Coast (Crimean Tatar: Yalı Boyu; Ukrainian: Південний берег, romanized: Pivdennyj bereh; Russian: Южный берег, romanized: Yuzhny bereg), also referred to as the Crimean Riviera, is a geographic region located in southern Crimea, a region internationally recognised as part of Ukraine but currently controlled by Russia. Stretching from Cape Aya to Kara Dag Mountain, the Southern Coast has a total length of about 180 km (110 mi). The Southern Coast has historically been a prominent tourist location due to its relatively warm climate and purported benefits for respiratory health, and drew an estimated 500,000 tourists yearly as of 1984.

== Climate ==
The warmest part of Crimea, the Southern Coast has a humid subtropical climate, bordering on a hot-summer mediterranean climate, and is prone to cyclones in winter and high atmospheric pressure in the summer. Temperatures in the city of Yalta, for example, peak at around 29.4°C (84.9°F) in August before dropping to a low of 2.2°C (36.0°F) in February.

Climate data for Yalta (1991–2020 normals, extremes 1948–present)
Month	Jan	Feb	Mar	Apr	May	Jun	Jul	Aug	Sep	Oct	Nov	Dec	Year
Record high °C (°F)	17.8 (64.0)	20.2 (68.4)	27.8 (82.0)	28.5 (83.3)	33.0 (91.4)	35.0 (95.0)	39.1 (102.4)	39.1 (102.4)	33.2 (91.8)	31.5 (88.7)	25.2 (77.4)	22.0 (71.6)	39.1 (102.4)
Mean daily maximum °C (°F)	7.4 (45.3)	7.7 (45.9)	10.4 (50.7)	14.8 (58.6)	20.5 (68.9)	25.7 (78.3)	29.1 (84.4)	29.4 (84.9)	24.2 (75.6)	18.3 (64.9)	12.8 (55.0)	8.9 (48.0)	17.4 (63.3)
Daily mean °C (°F)	4.6 (40.3)	4.6 (40.3)	6.8 (44.2)	11.1 (52.0)	16.4 (61.5)	21.6 (70.9)	24.8 (76.6)	25.0 (77.0)	20.1 (68.2)	14.6 (58.3)	9.7 (49.5)	6.3 (43.3)	13.8 (56.8)
Mean daily minimum °C (°F)	2.5 (36.5)	2.2 (36.0)	4.1 (39.4)	8.1 (46.6)	13.1 (55.6)	18.1 (64.6)	21.1 (70.0)	21.5 (70.7)	16.8 (62.2)	11.7 (53.1)	7.2 (45.0)	4.1 (39.4)	10.9 (51.6)
Record low °C (°F)	−12.2 (10.0)	−12.3 (9.9)	−7.3 (18.9)	−3.8 (25.2)	2.8 (37.0)	7.8 (46.0)	12.4 (54.3)	10.0 (50.0)	3.9 (39.0)	−1.1 (30.0)	−8.9 (16.0)	−7.4 (18.7)	−12.3 (9.9)
Average precipitation mm (inches)	76 (3.0)	56 (2.2)	48 (1.9)	29 (1.1)	36 (1.4)	35 (1.4)	32 (1.3)	43 (1.7)	43 (1.7)	52 (2.0)	57 (2.2)	84 (3.3)	591 (23.3)
Average extreme snow depth cm (inches)	1 (0.4)	1 (0.4)	1 (0.4)	0 (0)	0 (0)	0 (0)	0 (0)	0 (0)	0 (0)	0 (0)	0 (0)	0 (0)	1 (0.4)
Average rainy days	14	12	13	12	11	10	8	7	10	10	12	15	134
Average snowy days	6	6	4	0.2	0	0	0	0	0	0	1	3	20
Average relative humidity (%)	75.7	73.6	72.7	72.0	69.7	67.7	61.9	61.5	65.4	71.5	74.4	75.1	70.1
Mean monthly sunshine hours	68.6	85.1	133.3	174.9	239.2	273.2	308.1	280.6	216.2	145.1	89.3	63.2	2,076.8
Source 1: Pogoda.ru.net
Source 2: World Meteorological Organization (humidity and sun 1981–2010)

The Southern Coast has a substantial variety of flora, numbering at around 1,500 species which are mostly related to other species found in areas around the Mediterranean Sea. Among these species are the juniper, stone pine, Oleander, Aleppo pine, Pinus brutia, Pistacia terebinthus, Olea europaea, Opuntia ficus-indica, Cupressus sempervirens and Arbutus andrachne. A variety of palm trees is also cultivated in the region, for instance species like Trachycarpus fortunei, Washingtonia robusta and Phoenix canariensis. Orchards, vineyards, and plantations were historically a significant part of the local economy.

== Tourism and landmarks ==
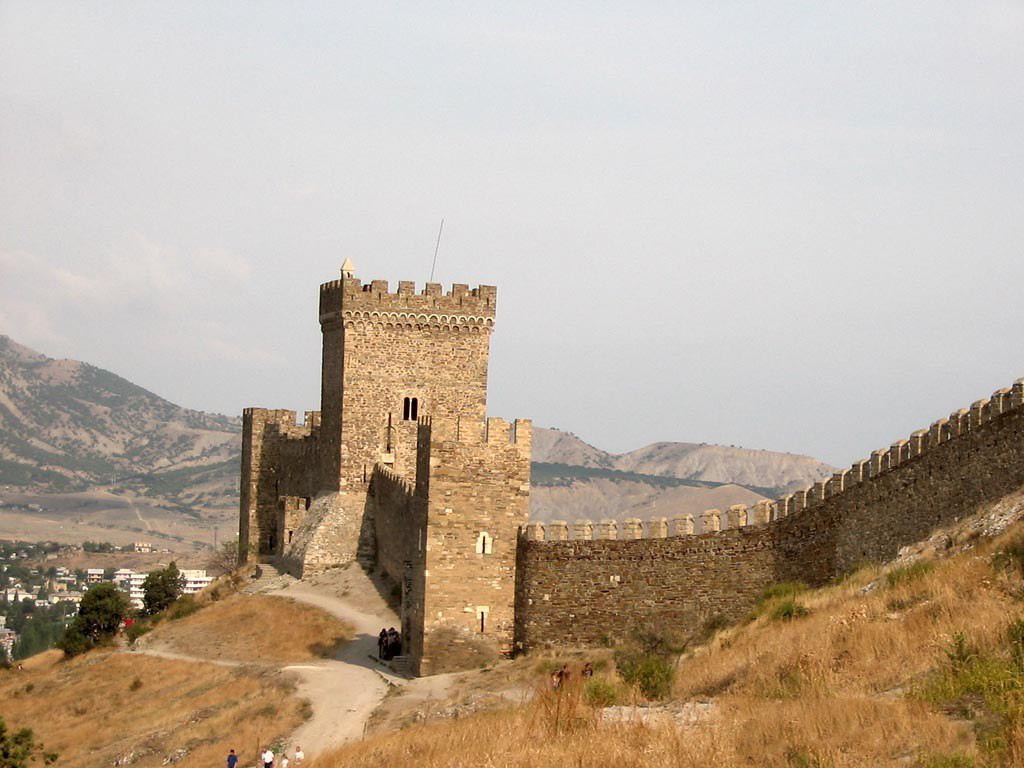
The Genoese Fortress is located on the Southern Coast

A number of landmarks, both natural and man-made, exist on the Southern Coast, and several nature reserves exist in the area (among them Karadag Nature Reserve, Cape Martyan Reserve, and the Nikitsky Botanical Garden). The area is dotted with volcanic geological formations, among them Kara Dag Mountain and Ayu-Dag. The region is also known as a resort location, and is home to several palaces, among them the Vorontsov Palace in Alupka, the Genoese Fortress in Sudak, the Livadia Palace, and the Yusupov Palace in Koreiz.

In addition to its buildings, resorts, and nature reserves, the Southern Coast is home to several "health paths", in line with the proposals of Russian clinician Sergey Botkin. Among these paths is the Tsar's Path, which was built under the supervision of Tsar Alexander III. Following Botkin's death, Botkin's trail was created by supporters of his methods. The Southern Coast's purported health benefits, particularly for respiratory illnesses, were claimed by the Volodymyr Kubijovyč to be the leading cause of tourism in the area, and, at the time of publishing of the first Encyclopedia of Ukraine, over 500,000 tourists visited the Southern Coast yearly, compared to the area's relatively-meagre population of 20,000.

=== Gay community ===
The Southern Coast has historically been home to a significant gay community. A nudist beach opened in the urban-type settlement of Simeiz during Soviet times, and was followed after the Declaration of Independence of Ukraine by Hedgehogs, a bar and night club. Prior to the annexation of Crimea by the Russian Federation, Hedgehogs served as a popular location for homosexuals from Ukraine, Belarus, and Russia to gather, bringing about 4,000 tourists annually. As of 2018, Simeiz is home to the last gay bar in Crimea, due to anti-LGBT activities by the Russian government.

A noteworthy incident occurred in 2014, when a gay resident of the Southern Coast was taken into custody and tortured by Russian police until he agreed to surrender his home to Russian authorities. A similar incident occurred earlier in the same year when another gay man living on the Southern Coast was taken into custody and later died in prison. Real estate seizures have also occurred against other vulnerable communities, such as drug users.

== History ==
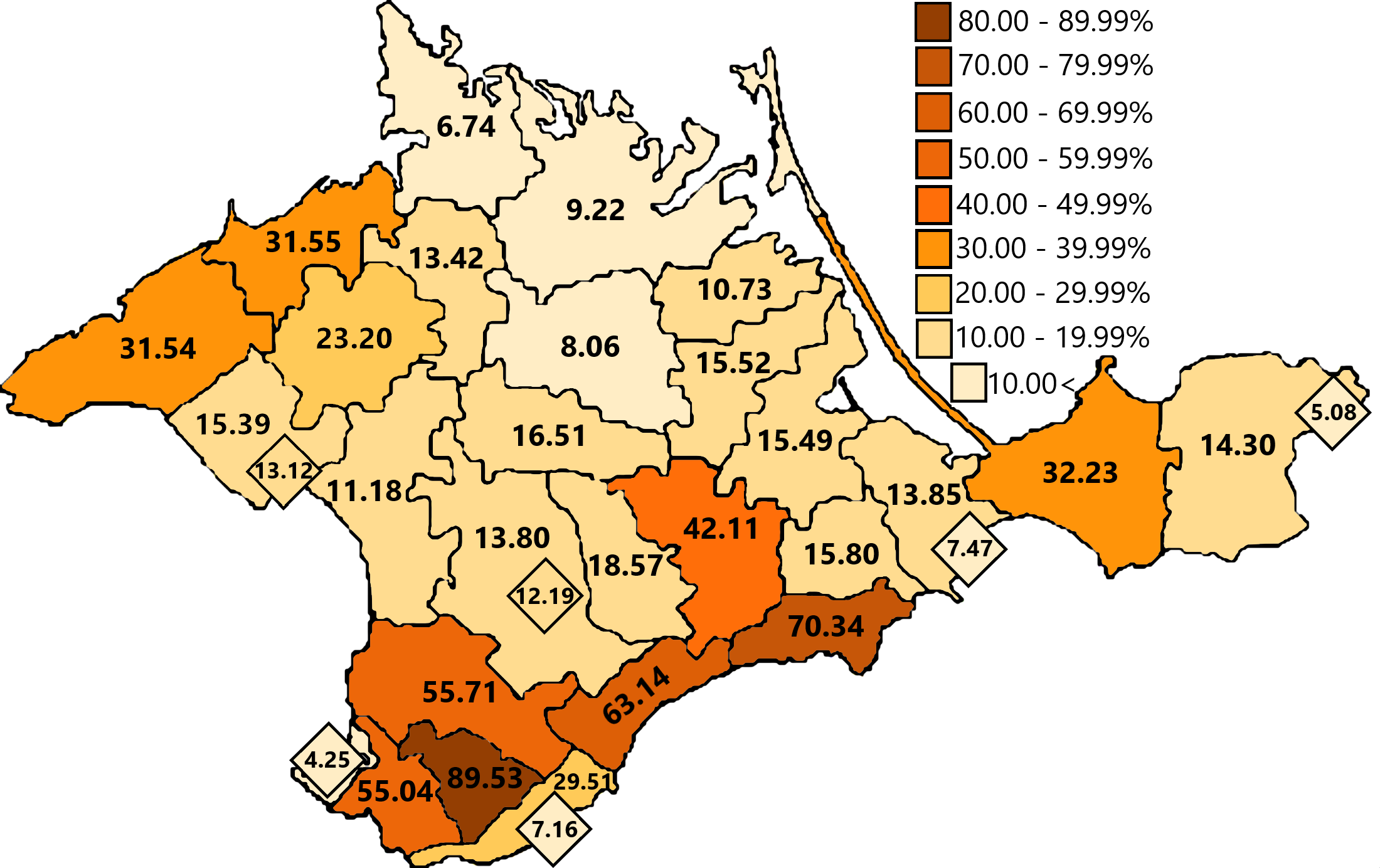
Map of Crimean Tatars in Crimea according to the 1939 Soviet census

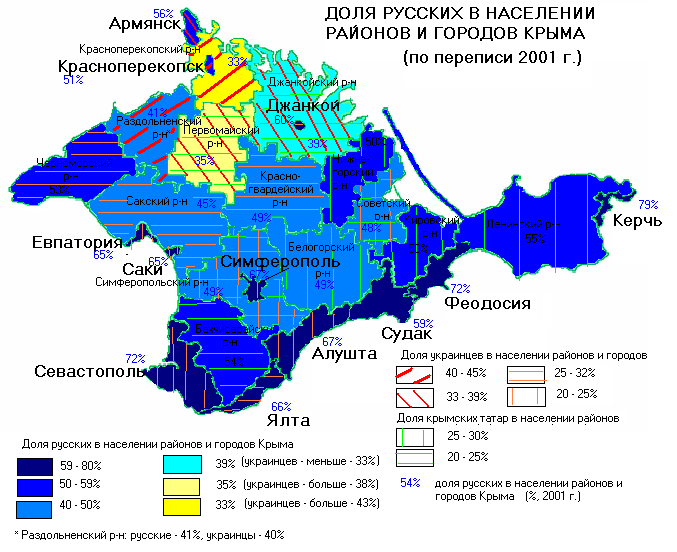
Map of ethnic Russians in Crimea according to the 2001 Ukrainian census

Evidence of prehistoric settlement has been found on the Southern Coast, particularly Oldowan tools found at Eçki Dağ, Gaspra, Ai-Petri, and near Sevastopol. The Tauri lived on the Southern Coast, where they intermingled with the Greeks and Romans. Today, several remnants of these interactions remain, such as the fortress of Charax and various toponyms (Simeiz, Gaspra, and Koreiz, among others). The Republic of Genoa also colonised the coast, under the territory of Genoese Gazaria. In 1475, the area was conquered by the Ottoman Empire and subjugated before becoming part of Russia following the Russo-Turkish War of 1768–1774, along with the rest of Crimea.

Historically, the Southern Coast was the region of the Crimean Peninsula most inhabited by Crimean Tatars; as of the 1939 Soviet census, Yalta Municipality was 29.51% Crimean Tatar, Alushta Municipality was 63.14% Crimean Tatar, and Sudak Municipality was 70.34% Crimean Tatar. However, since the deportation of the Crimean Tatars it has been extensively settled and is now relatively more extensively populated by Russians; according to the 2001 Ukrainian census, Yalta Raion is 66% Russian, Alushta Municipality is 67% Russian, and Sudak Municipality is 59% Russian (compared to 58.5% of the population of the Autonomous Republic of Crimea as a whole). Ethnic Ukrainians account for 20-30% of the population and make up the largest minority in Southern Crimea. They constitute a majority in some settlements, yet most Ukrainians living on the Southern Coast speak Russian as their first language. For instance, only 35.7% of all Ukrainians living in the Yalta municipality speak Ukrainian as their primary language, slightly higher percentages were recorded in Sudak (47.0%), Alushta (41.4%) and Feodosia (38.5%).

== Administration ==
The Southern Coast is currently under the control of Russia since the annexation of Crimea by the Russian Federation, and, according to Russian and pre-2020 Ukrainian internal boundaries, is governed by the Yalta, Alushta, and Sudak Municipalities, as well as the city of Sevastopol and part of Feodosia Municipality. Since the 2020 reform of Ukrainian administrative divisions, the Southern Coast is included under the Yalta Raion and parts of the Bakhchysarai and Feodosia Raions.

== Gallery ==
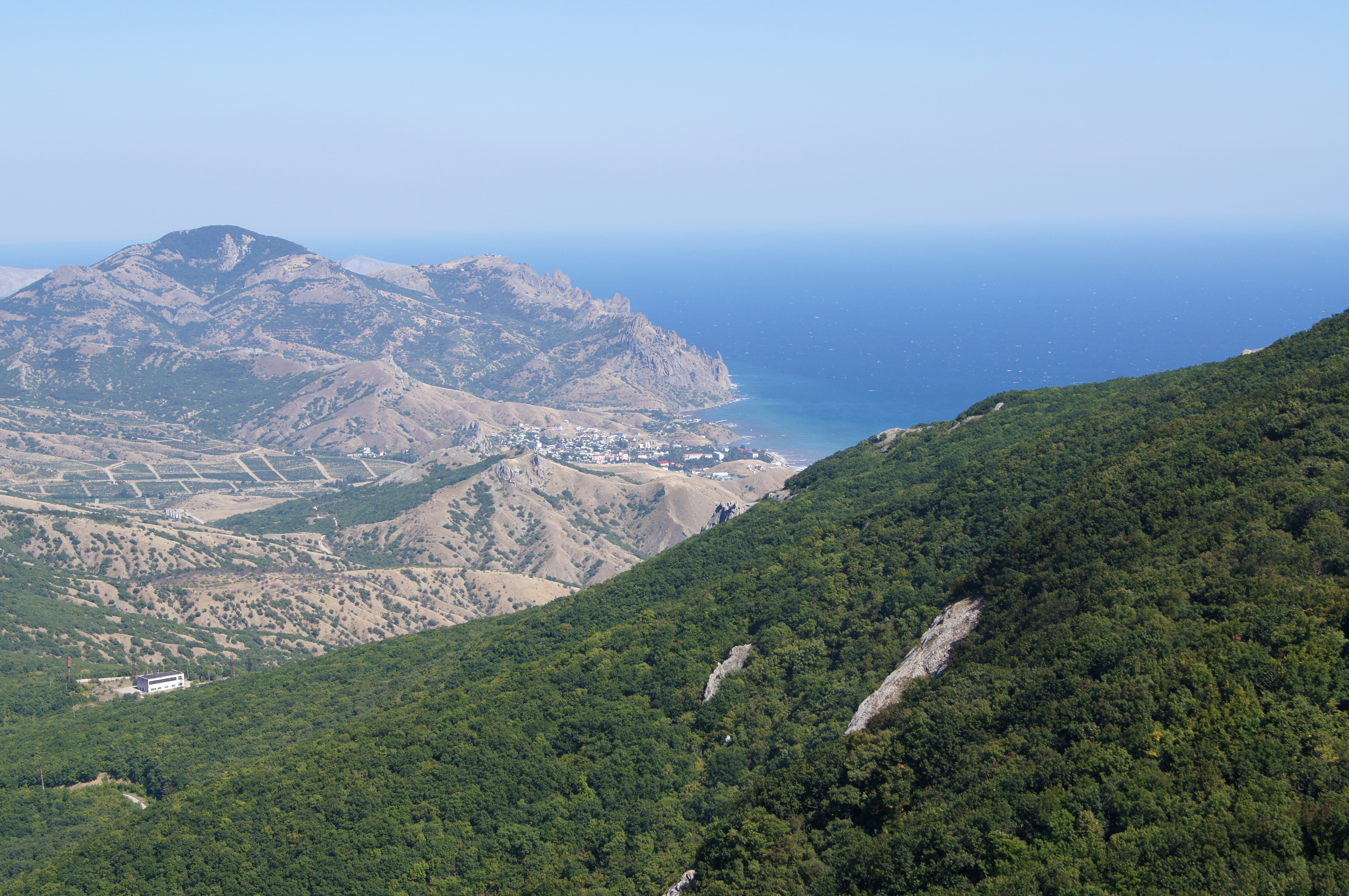
The coast seen from the Crimean Mountains

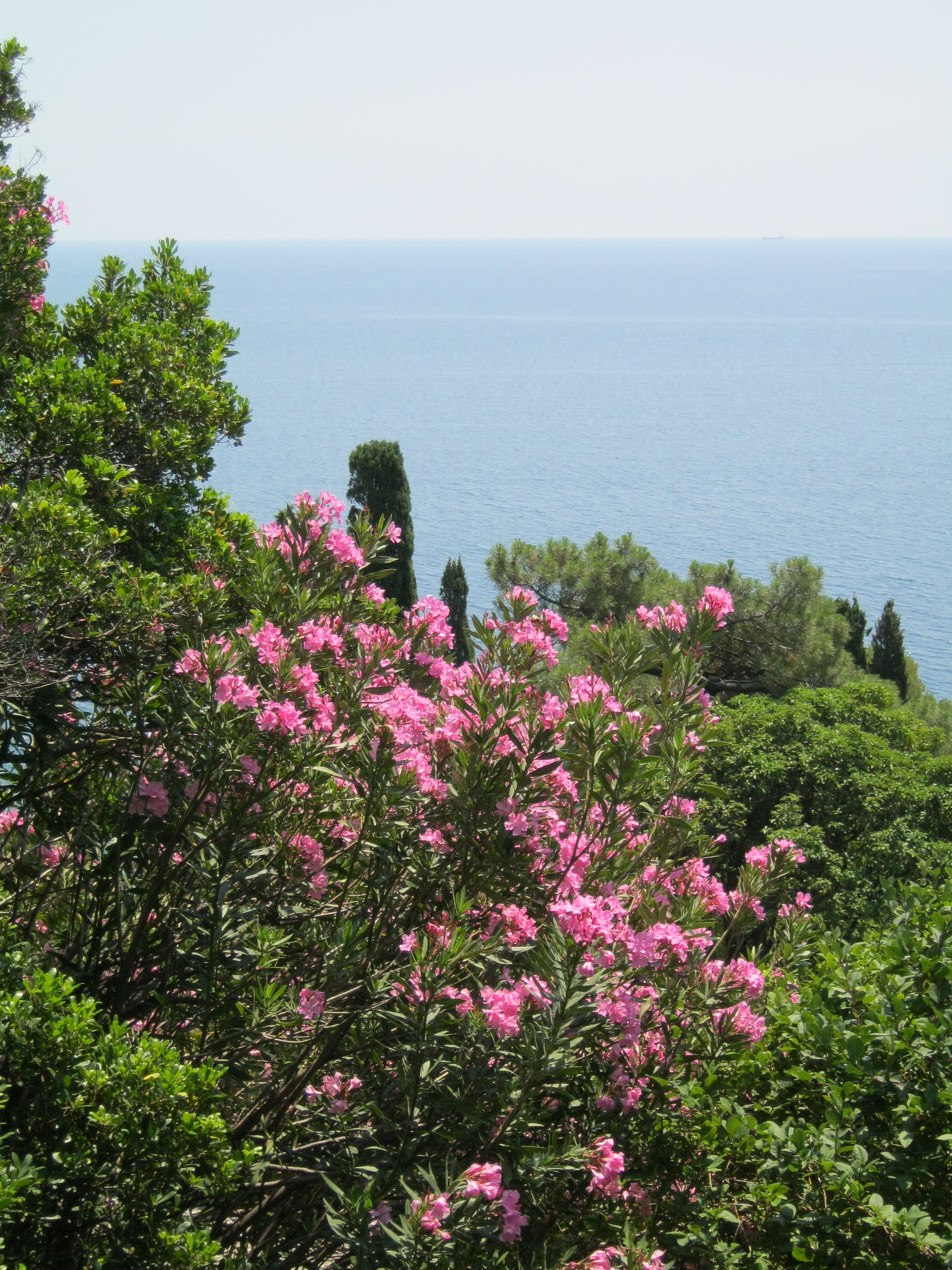
The coast and a large oleander shrub in Massandra

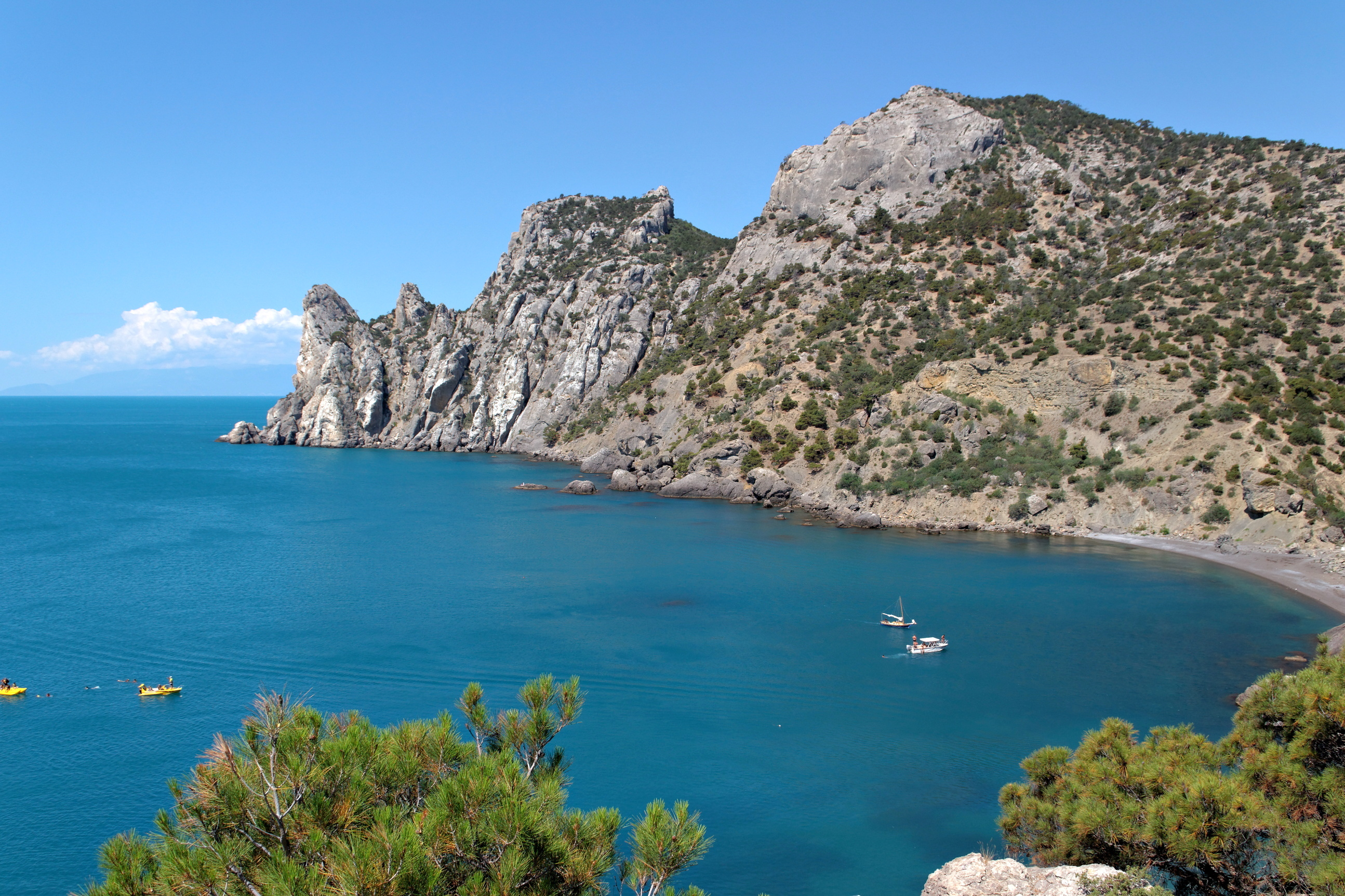
Coast near Novyi Svit

Broadwalk in Yalta

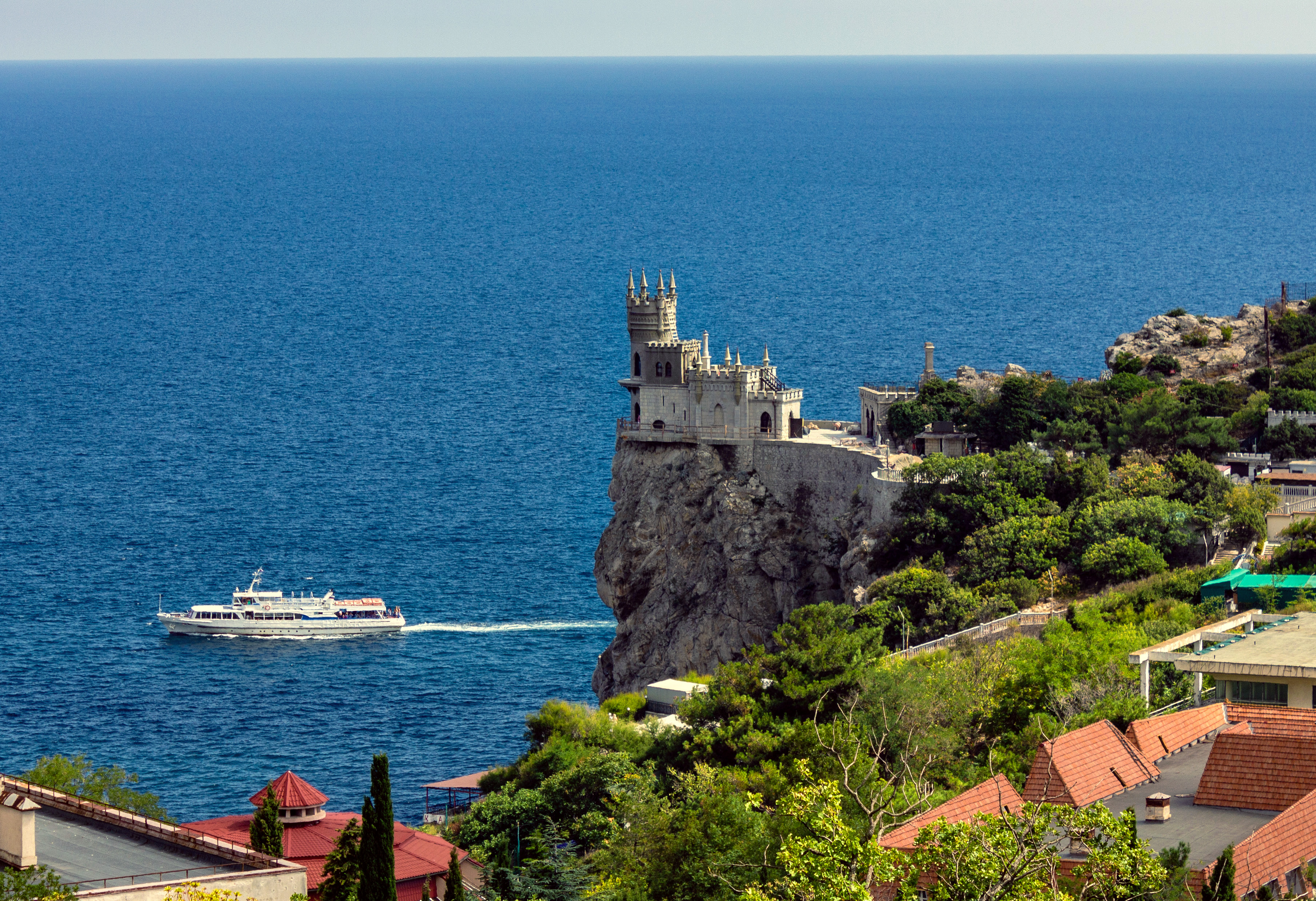
Swallow's Nest castle near Haspra

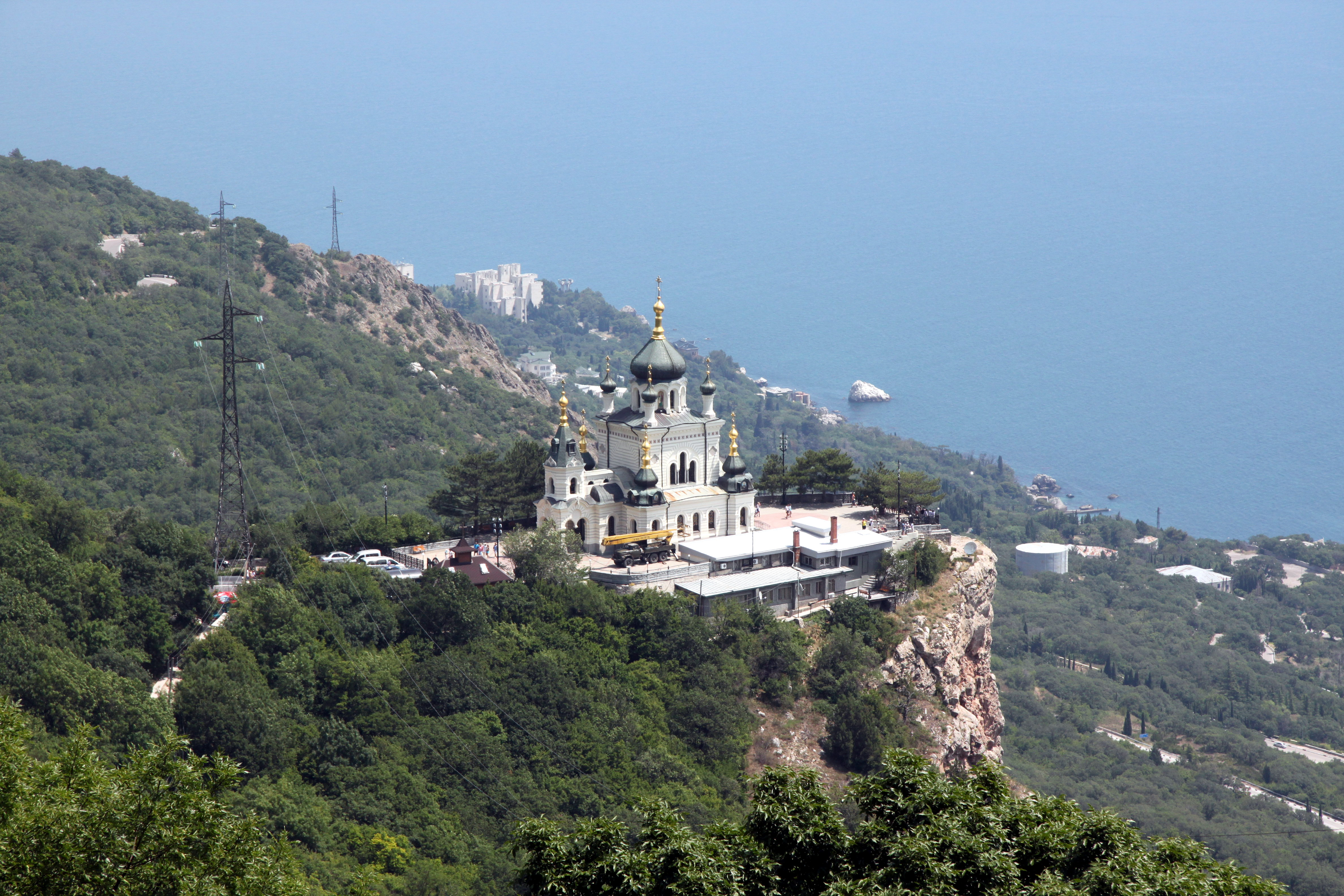
The Church of Christ's Resurrection is a popular wedding spot in Foros

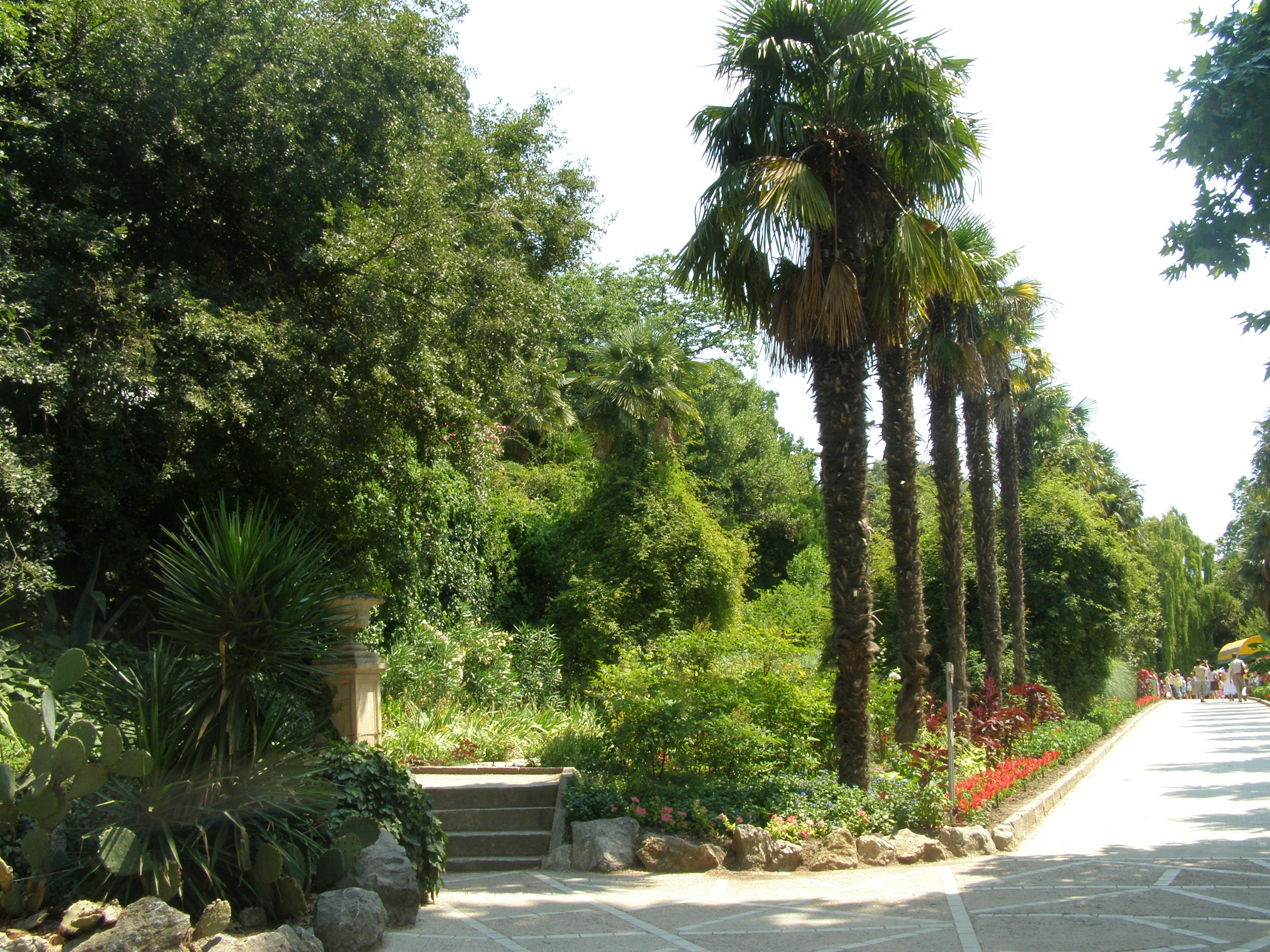
Nikitskiy Botanical Garden

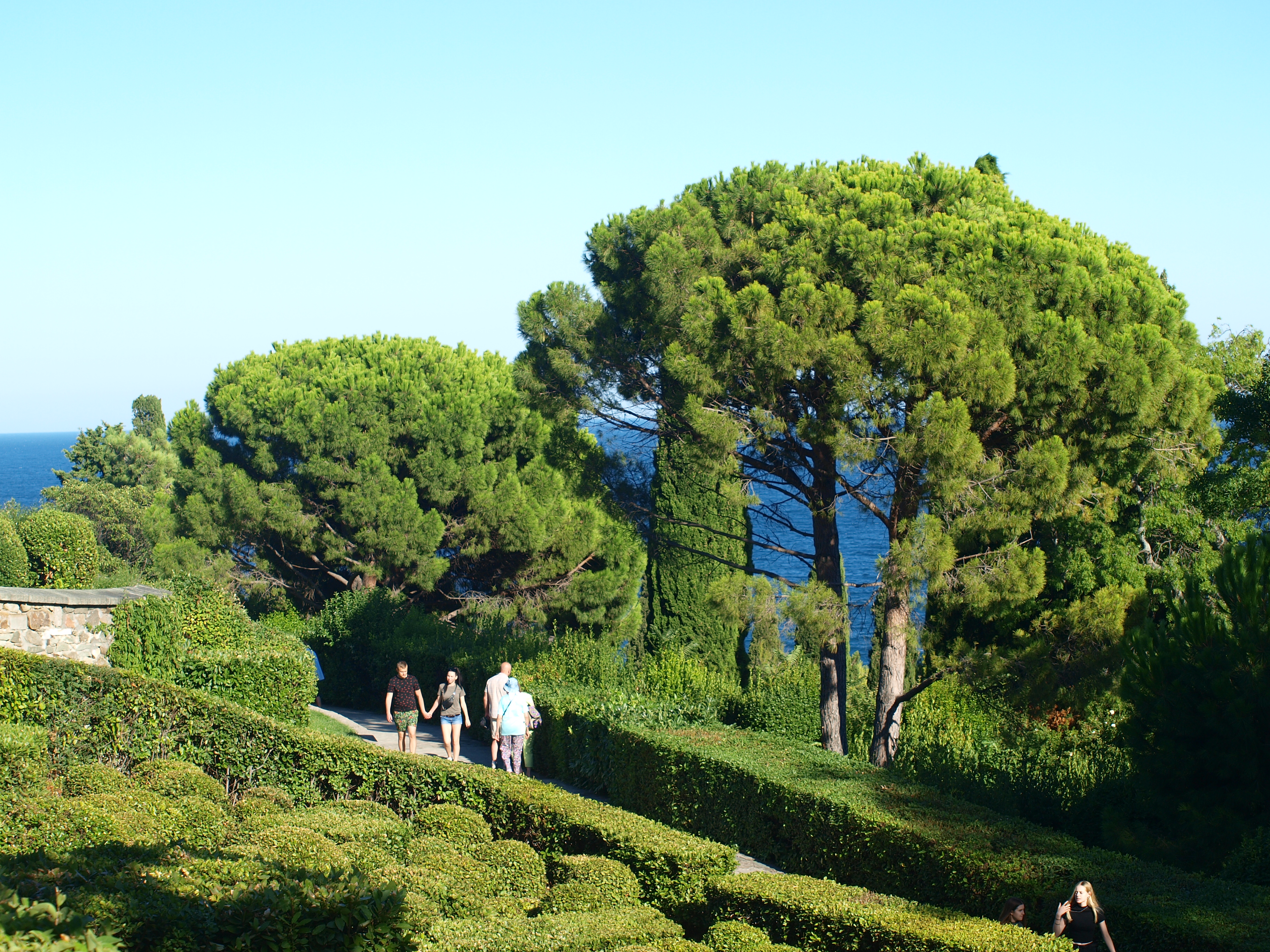
Stone pines in Alupka

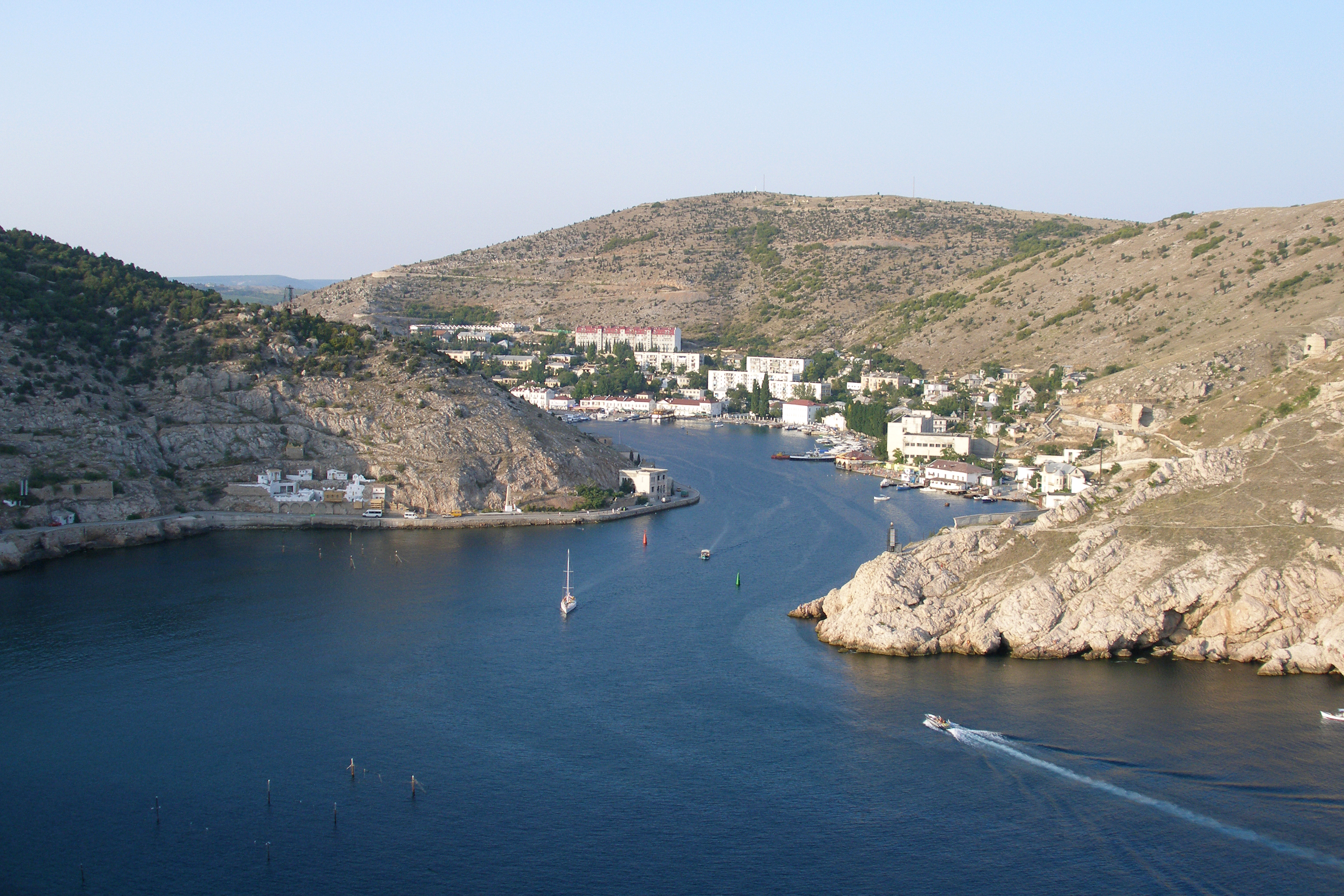
Balaklava Bay near Sevastopol
