= Haspra =

Haspra may refer to:

== People ==
- Dávid Haspra (born 2000), Slovak footballer
- Ján Haspra (born 1969), Slovak football manager

== Places ==
- Gaspra, also transliterated as Haspra, a town in Crimea

== See also ==
- Josef Haszpra (1882–1966), Czech-Slovak caster of statues
