= Gulf of Yalta =

Coordinates: 44°29′00″N 34°10′00″E

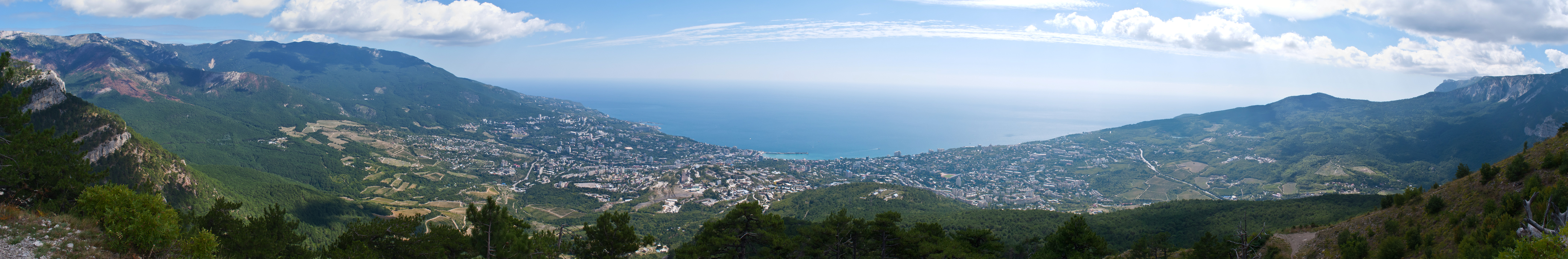

- Location within Crimea
- Location: Black Sea
- Ocean/sea sources: Atlantic Ocean
- Basin countries: Russia/Ukraine
- Max. length: 3 km (1.9 mi)
- Max. width: 13 km (8.1 mi)
- Average depth: 75 m (246 ft)

Gulf of Yalta (Russian: Ялтинский залив; Ukrainian: Ялтинська затока; Crimean Tatar: Yalta körfezi, Ялта корьфези) is a gulf in the Black Sea near Yalta, Crimea.
