= Roffe Bath =

Historical monument in Yalta, Crimea

Coordinates: 44°29′58″N 34°09′19″E

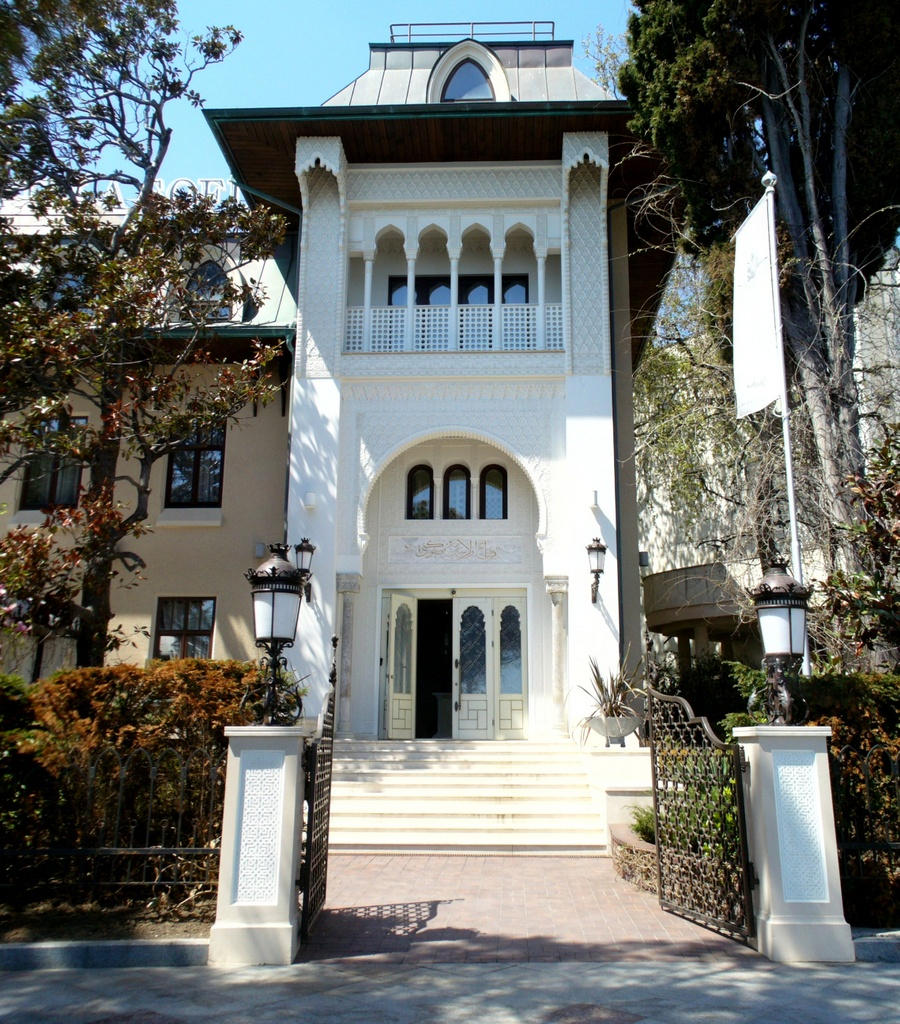
Entrance to Roffe Bath

Roffe Bath is a historical monument in the center of Yalta, Crimea. It is part of the ensemble "France" built by the architect Nikolay Krasnov, designer of the Greater Livadia Palace, by the order of merchant Alexey I. Roffe, the owner of the guild Rofe (Roffe) and Sons, with the pool added in front of the portal in Moorish style.

Famous people, such as Ivan Bunin, Fyodor Shalyapin, Anton Chekhov and other members of the Society of Writers and scholars, have stayed at the Roffe Bath.

Since its renovation, it has been named Villa Sofia (in honor of Sofia Rotaru). In 2008, S. Rotaru opened a hotel in the building. Since 2014, the establishment has not been in operation. The Crimean authorities have expressed intentions to nationalize the property and turn it into a wedding palace. Sergey Tsekov, Senator from Crimea and member of the Federation Council Committee on Foreign Affairs, supported the idea of putting Villa Sofia up for auction or changing its ownership structure in favor of the state.
