= Tsar's Path =

Walking path near Yalta, Crimea

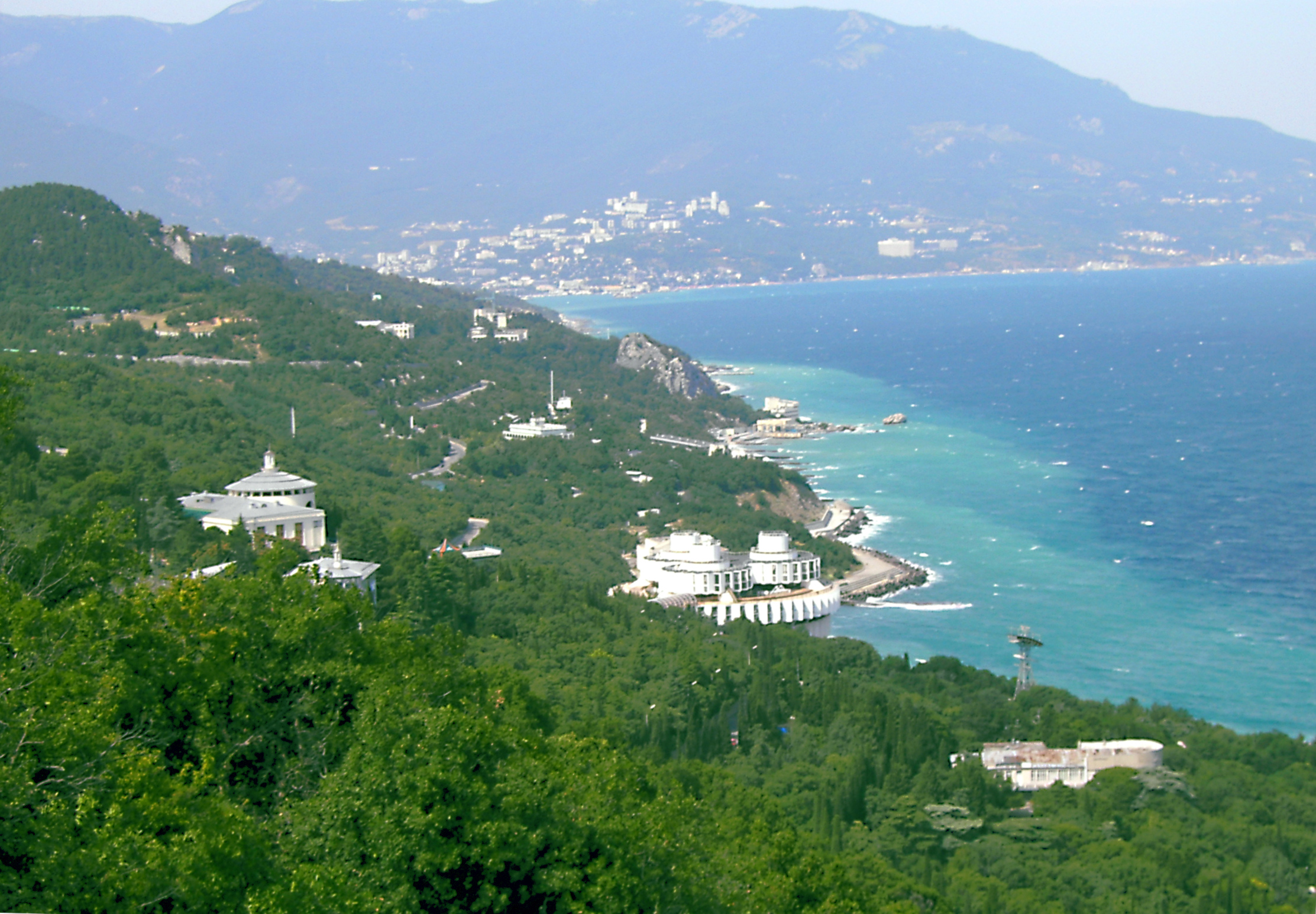
The Crimean Mountains in the background and Yalta as seen from the Tsar's Path.

The Tsar's Path (Russian: Царская тропа) or the Solnechnaya Tropa (Russian: Солнечная тропа) is a scenic walking path that runs along the edge of the Crimean Mountains near the city of Yalta. The path starts out at the Livadia Palace and runs west to its finish at the Swallow's Nest in nearby Gaspra.

The path was built in 1861 by for recreational use by the Russian Tsar Alexander III near his Crimean resort at the Livadia Palace. It was built upon the family doctor's recommendation due to its healing and therapeutic elements that are attributed to the local climate which would help with the family's tuberculosis health problems. Its construction finished in 1901, and it remained one of the Romanov family's favorite relaxation spots. Because of the name of the path and its references to Imperial Russia, the path was renamed to the Solnechnaya Tropa (or Sunny Path) during Soviet times.

The path runs for 6.35 kilometres (3.95 mi) at an average of 150 metres (490 ft) above sea level. The path was constructed with no major gradient changes and laid completely horizontally, despite its location among the rugged Crimean terrain, as differences in elevation will have an adverse effect on those with medical conditions. The path itself is landscaped with rare and exotic flora and

lined with various sculptures and monuments.

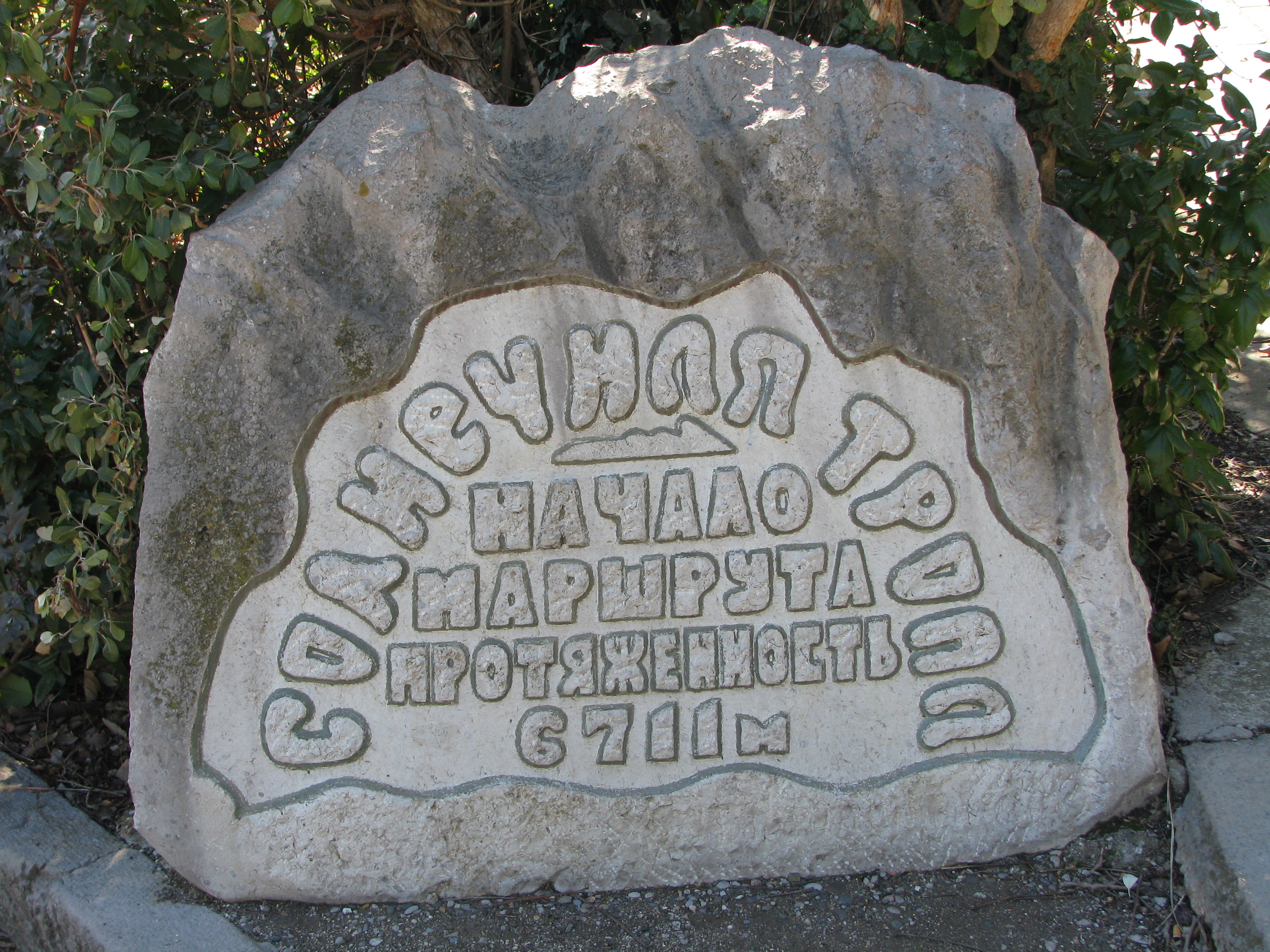
Modern sign of the beginning of the trail. Livadia.

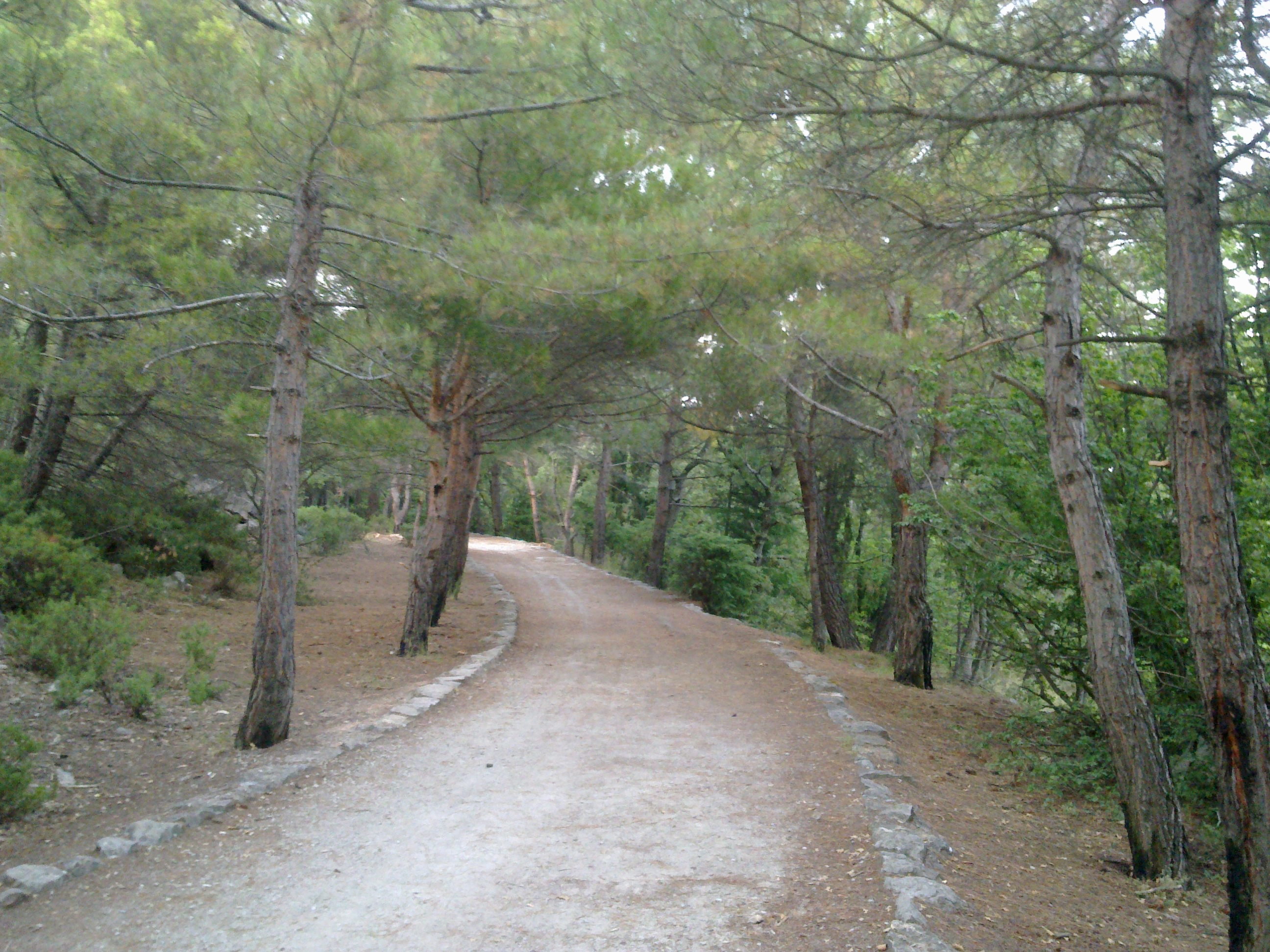

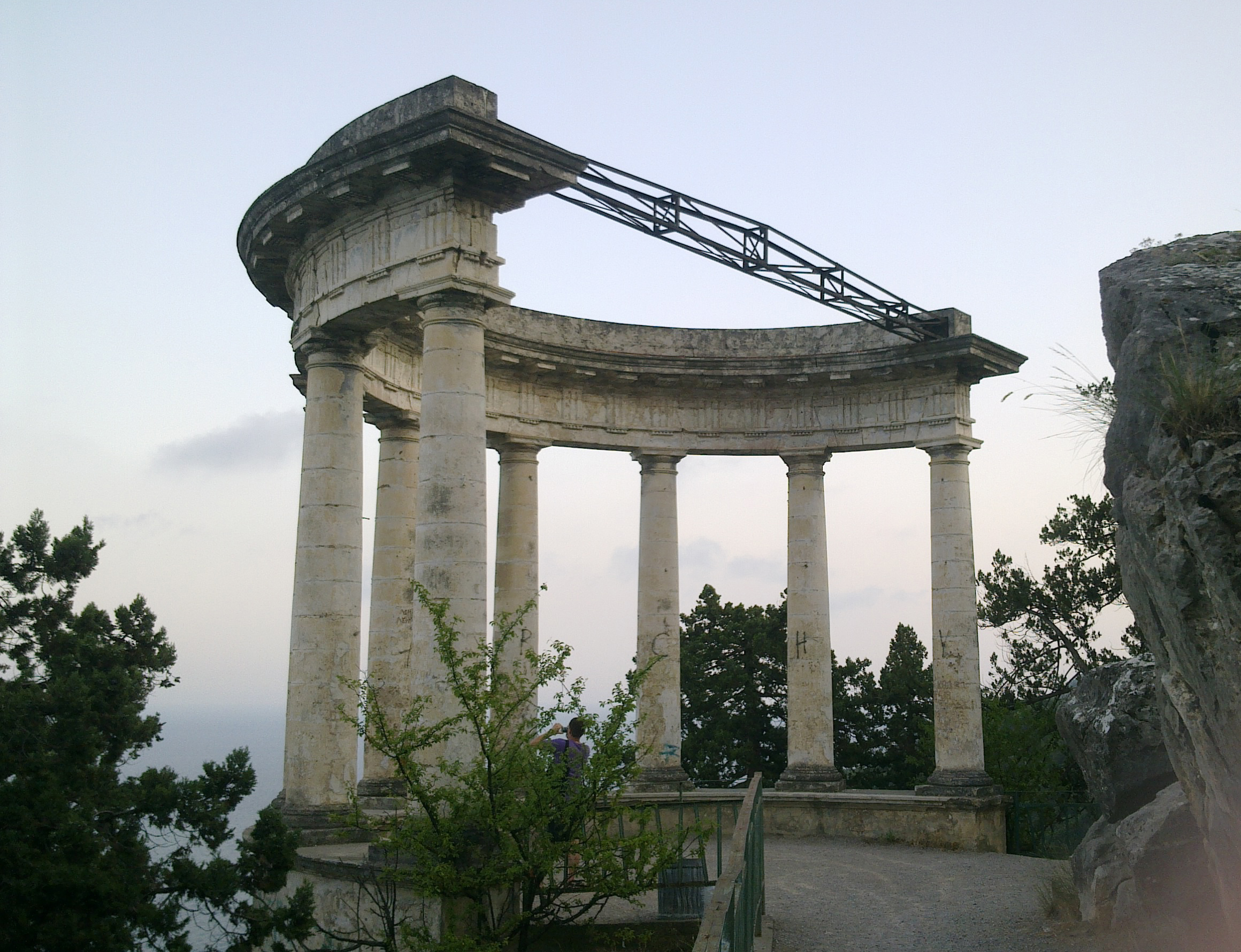
Rotunda
