= Swallow's Nest =

Castle in the Crimean peninsula

Coordinates: 44°25′50″N 34°07′43″E

- Swallow's Nest, one of the Neo-Gothic châteaux fantastiques near Yalta

General information
- Architectural style: Gothic Revival

Immovable Monument of National Significance of Ukraine
- Official name: Палац “Ластівчине гніздо” (Swallow's Nest Palace)
- Type: Architecture
- Reference no.: 0100112

The Swallow's Nest (Russian: Ласточкино гнездо, romanized: Lastochkino gnezdo, Ukrainian: Ластівчине гніздо, romanized: Lastivchyne hnizdo) (Note: German: Schwalbennest; Crimean Tatar: Къарылгъач ювасы, romanized: Qarılğaç yuvası;.) is a decorative castle located at Gaspra, a small spa town between Yalta and Alupka on the Crimean peninsula. It was built between 1911 and 1912, on top of the 40-metre-high (130 ft) Aurora Cliff, in a Neo-Gothic design by the Russian architect Leonid Sherwood (Note: Leonid Sherwood's father was Vladimir Sherwood, who was responsible for designing the State Historical Museum on Red Square.) for Pavel Leonardovich von Steingel, a Russian noble with German roots.

The castle overlooks the Cape of Ai-Todor on the Black Sea coast and is located near the remains of the Roman castrum of Charax. The Swallow's Nest is one of the most popular visitor attractions in Crimea, having become the symbol of Crimea's southern coastline.

== Description ==
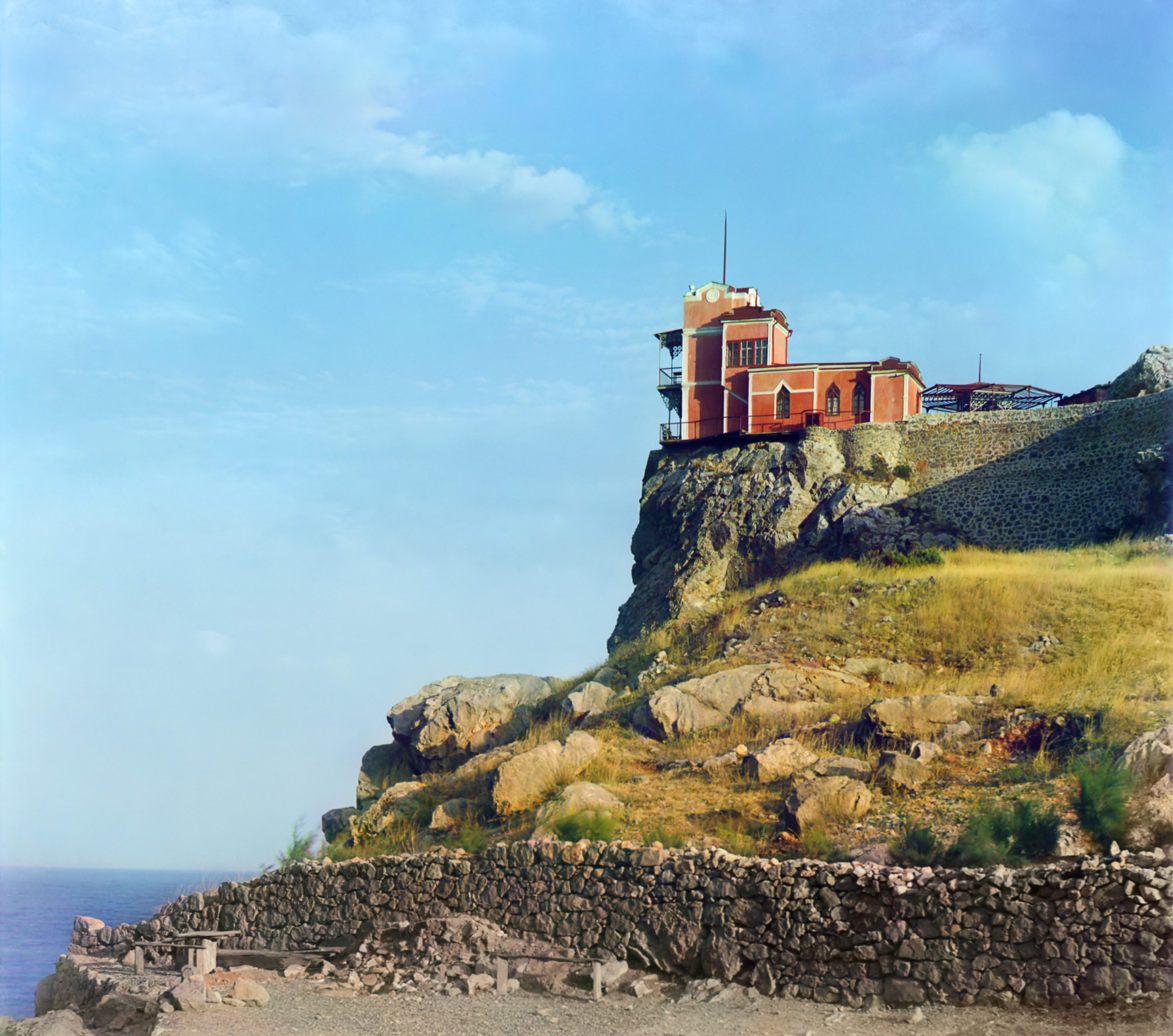
The original wooden Swallow's Nest photographed by Sergey Prokudin-Gorsky 1905, digitally restored in colour.

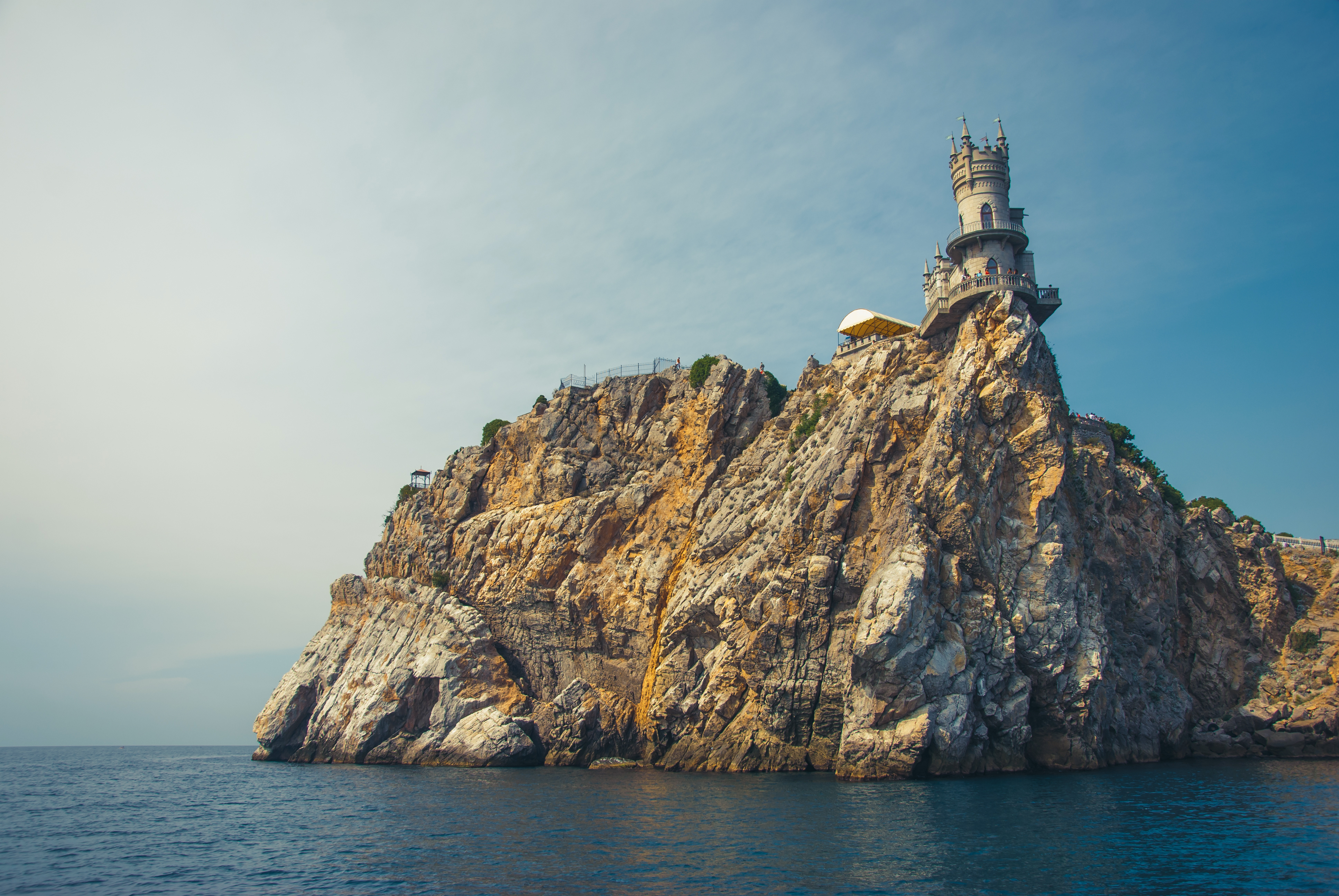
Swallow's Nest viewed from the sea

The building is compact in size, measuring only 20 m (66 ft) long by 10 m (33 ft) wide. Its original design envisioned a foyer, guest room, stairway to the tower, and two bedrooms on two different levels within the tower. The interior of the guest room is decorated with wooden panels; the walls of the rest of the rooms are stuccoed and painted. An observation deck rings the building, providing a view of the sea, and Yalta's distant shoreline.

== History ==
The first building on the Aurora Cliff was constructed for a Russian general circa 1895. (Note: The general's name is still not determined.) The first structure he built was a wooden cottage romantically named the "Castle of Love." Later on, the ownership of the cottage passed to A. K. Tobin, a court doctor to the Russian tsar.

In 1911 a Russian nobleman of German ancestry, Baron Pavel Leonardovich von Steinheil (1880–1965), the son of Baron Leonard Vasilievitch von Steinheil (1843–1918) and his wife, Ekaterina Pavlovna Kamenskaya (1850–1929), who had made a fortune extracting oil in Baku, acquired the timber cottage and within a year had it replaced with the current building called Schwalbennest. The Scots Baronial and Moorish Revival styles had been introduced in the Crimea in the 1820s by Edward Blore, the architect of the Vorontsov Palace (1828–46). Compared to the Alupka and Koreiz palaces, the Swallow's Nest is closer in style to various German fairy-tale-inspired castle follies, such as Lichtenstein Castle, Neuschwanstein Castle and Stolzenfels Castle, although its precarious seaside setting on the cliffs draws parallels with the Belém Tower in Portugal, or Miramare Castle on the Gulf of Trieste outside Trieste, Italy.

In 1914, von Steingel sold the building to P. G. Shelaputin to be used as a restaurant. For a short time after the 1917 Russian Revolution, the building was used only as a tourist attraction. In 1927, the Swallow's Nest survived a serious earthquake rated at 6 to 7 on the Richter scale. The building was not damaged apart from some small decorative items that were thrown into the sea along with a small portion of the cliff. However, the cliff itself developed a huge crack. In the 1930s, the building was used by a reading club from the nearby "Zhemchuzhina" (Pearl) resort, however it was closed shortly thereafter as a safety precaution due to the damage it had suffered in the earthquake, remaining closed for the next 40 years.

Renovation and restoration of the building began in 1968. The project involved the restoration of a small portion of the castle and the addition of a monolithic console concrete plate to strengthen the cliff. Since 1975, a restaurant has operated within the building. In 2011, the Swallow's Nest was closed for three months due to major restoration work estimated to cost 1,200,000 hryvnias ($150,000 USD).

== In culture ==
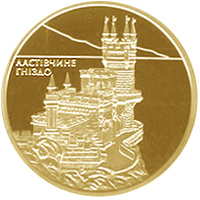
Swallow's Nest on a coin of the National Bank of Ukraine

Owing to its important status as the symbol of the Crimea's southern coast, the Swallow's Nest was featured in several Soviet films. It was used as the setting of Desyat Negrityat, the 1987 Soviet screen version of Agatha Christie's And Then There Were None. The building was also featured in the 1983 Polish/Soviet co-production children's film Mister Blot's Academy as well as in Mio in the Land of Faraway, a 1987 joint production by Swedish, Norwegian, and Soviet film companies.

== See also ==
- Tsar's Path, scenic pathway located near the Swallow's Nest
- Foros Church, similarly located attraction overlooking the Black Sea littoral near Yalta
- Belém Tower, similar structure in Lisbon, Portugal

== Bibliography ==
- Ivchenko, A.S.; Parkhomenko, O.A. (2010). Ukrayina. Fortetsi, zamky, palatsy (in Ukrainian). Kyiv: Kartohrafiya. ISBN 978-966-475-375-0.
- Ferentseva, Yuliia (2003). Touring the Crimea. Kyiv: Baltia Dryk. ISBN 966-96041-9-2.
- Zharikov, N. L. (1983–1986). "Lastochkino gnezdo palace, 1912". Monuments of urban development and architecture in the UkSSR (in Russian). Vol. 1–4. Kyiv: Budivel'nyk. LCCN 84179019.
