= Yalta =

City on the southern Crimean Peninsula

Yalta Ялта (Ukrainian and Russian)
- City
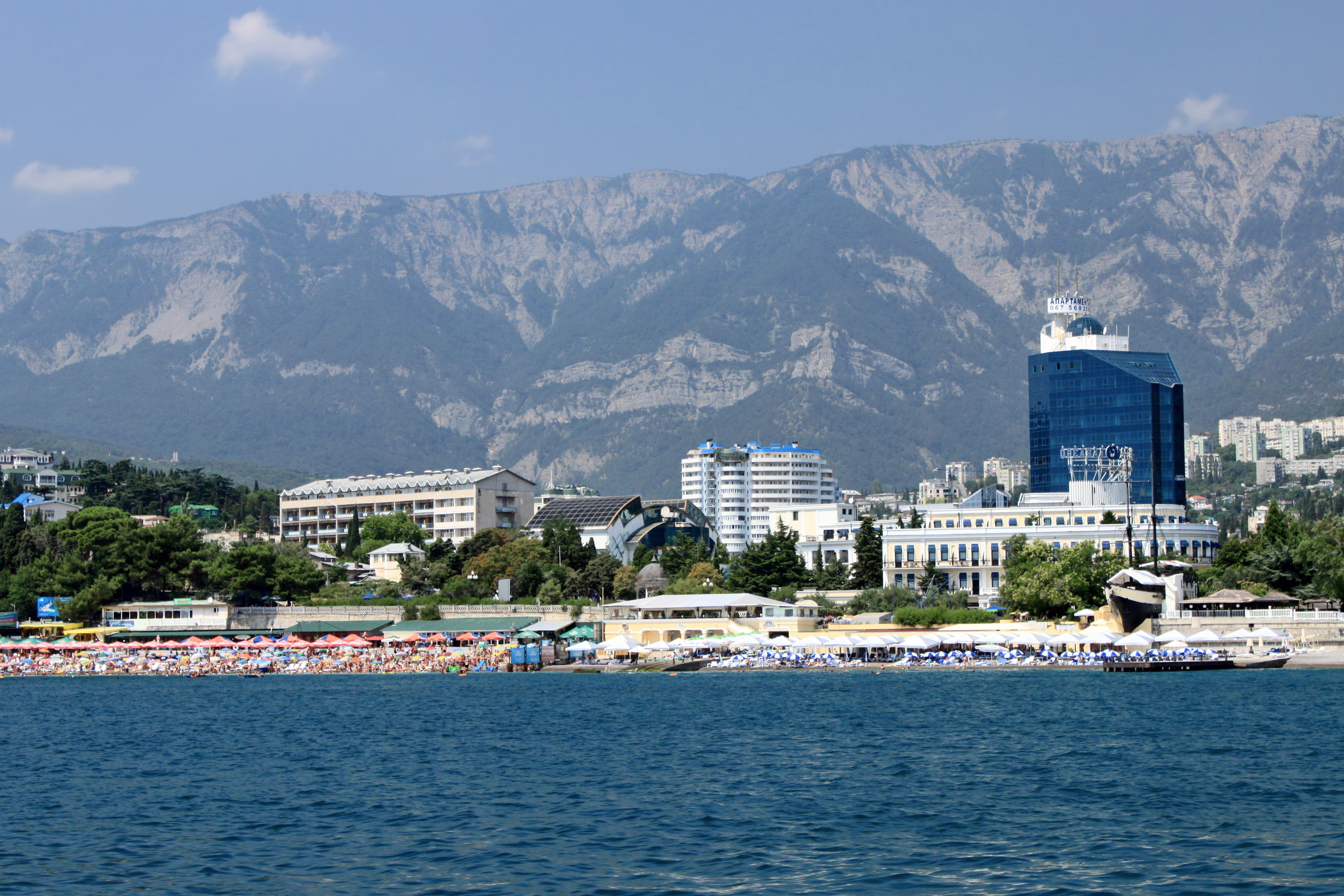

- Flag Coat of arms
- Anthem: Southern Capital
- Interactive map of Yalta
- Location of Yalta within Crimea Location of Yalta within Ukraine Location of Yalta within Russia Location of Yalta within Europe
- Coordinates: 44°29′58″N 34°10′12″E
- Republic: Crimea
- Municipality: Yalta Municipality

Area
  - Total: 17.41 km^{2} (6.72 sq mi)
- Elevation: 40 m (130 ft)

Population (2014)
  - Total: 76,746
  - Density: 4,408/km^{2} (11,420/sq mi)
- Time zone: UTC+3 (MSK)
- Postal codes: (2)98600–(2)98639
- Area code: +7-3654
- Former name: Yalita (until the 15th century)
- Climate: Cfa

Yalta (Note: English approximation of the name: UK: /ˈjæltə, ˈjɔːltə, ˈjɒltə/, US: /ˈjɔːltə/) (Ukrainian and Russian: Ялта) is a resort city on the south coast of the Crimean Peninsula surrounded by the Black Sea. It serves as the administrative center of Yalta Municipality, one of the regions within Crimea. Yalta, along with the rest of Crimea, is internationally recognised as part of Ukraine, and is considered part of the Autonomous Republic of Crimea. However, it is controlled de facto by Russia, which annexed Crimea in 2014 and regards the town as part of the Republic of Crimea. According to the most recent census, its population was 76,746 (2014 Census).

The city is located on the site of the ancient Greek colony of Yalita (Greek: Γιαλός, romanized: Gialós [ʝaˈlos̠]). It is said to have been founded by Greek settlers who were looking for a safe shore on which to land. It is situated on a deep bay facing south towards the Black Sea, surrounded by the mountain range Ai-Petri. It has a humid subtropical climate and is surrounded by numerous vineyards and orchards.

The area became famous in 1945 when the city held the Yalta Conference as part of the Allied World War II conferences of major wartime national leaders.

The term "Greater Yalta" is used to designate a part of the Crimean southern coast spanning from Foros in the west to Gurzuf in the east, and including the city of Yalta and multiple adjacent urban settlements.

== History ==
=== 12th–19th centuries ===
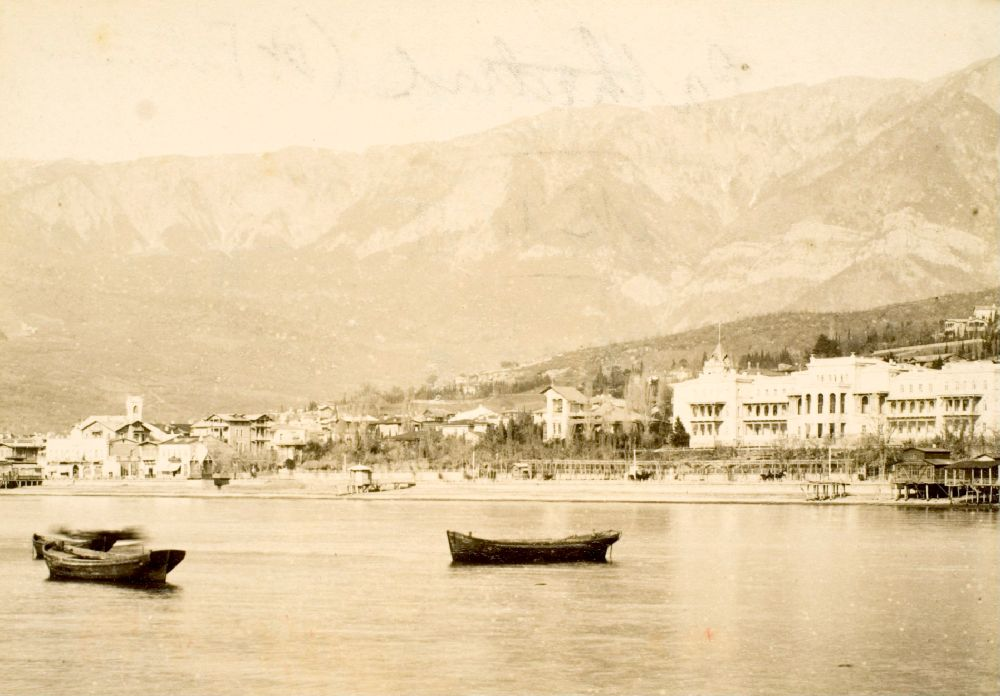
19th century photograph of Yalta, Department of Image Collections, National Gallery of Art Library, Washington, D.C.

The existence of Yalta was recorded in the 12th century by an Arab geographer, who described it as a Byzantine port and fishing settlement. It became part of a network of Genoese trading colonies on the Crimean coast in the 14th century when it was known as Etalita or Galita. Crimea was captured by the Ottoman Empire in 1475, which made it a semi-independent subject territory under the rule of the Crimean Khanate but the southern coast with Yalta was under direct Ottoman rule forming the Eyalet of Kefe (Feodosiya). Yalta was annexed by the Russian Empire in 1783, along with the rest of Crimea, sparking the Russo-Turkish War (1787–1792). Prior to the annexation of the Crimea, the Crimean Greeks were moved to Mariupol in 1778; one of the villages they established nearby is also called Yalta.

In the 19th century, the town became a fashionable resort for the Russian aristocracy and gentry. Leo Tolstoy spent summers there and Anton Chekhov in 1898 bought a house (the White Dacha) here, where he lived until 1902; Yalta is the setting for Chekhov's short story, "The Lady with the Dog", and such prominent plays as The Three Sisters were written in Yalta. The town was also closely associated with royalty. In 1889 Tsar Alexander III finished construction of Massandra Palace a short distance to the north of Yalta and Nicholas II built the Livadia Palace southwest of the town in 1911.

=== 20th century ===
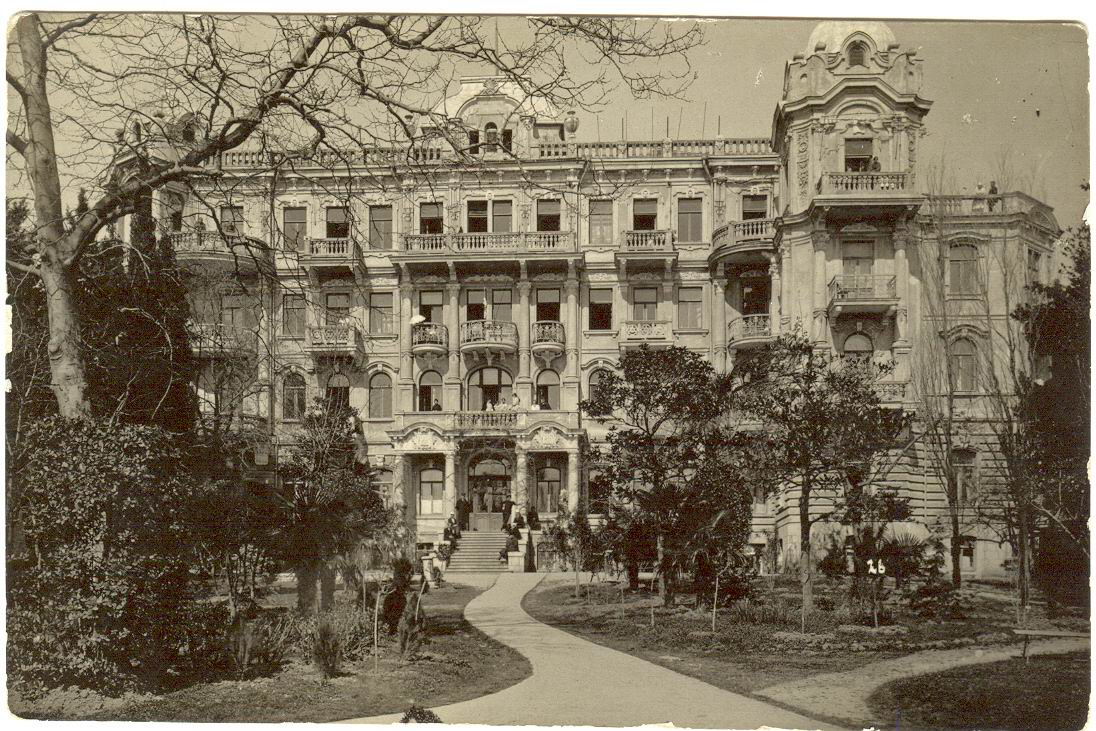
Yelena Villa in Yalta, c. 1915

During the 20th century, Yalta was the principal holiday resort of the Soviet Union. In 1920, Vladimir Lenin issued a decree "On the Use of Crimea for the Medical Treatment of the Working People" which endorsed the region's transformation from a fairly exclusive resort area into a recreation facility for tired proletarians. Numerous workers' sanatoria were constructed in and around Yalta and the surrounding district. There were, in fact, few other places that Soviet citizens could come for a seaside holiday, as foreign travel was forbidden to all but a handful. The Soviet elite also came to Yalta; the Soviet premier Joseph Stalin used the Massandra Palace as his summer residence.

Yalta was occupied by the German Army from 9 November 1941 to 16 April 1944.

The town came to worldwide attention in 1945 when the Yalta Conference between the "Big Three" powers – the Soviet Union, the United States and the United Kingdom – was held at the Livadia Palace.

=== 21st century ===
Following the dissolution of the Soviet Union in 1991, Yalta has struggled economically. Many of the nouveaux riches of ex-Soviet citizens began going to other European holiday resorts, now that they had the freedom and money to travel; conversely, the impoverishment of many ex-Soviet citizens meant that they could no longer afford to go to Yalta. The town's transport links have been significantly reduced with the end of almost all passenger traffic by sea. The longest trolleybus line in Europe goes from the train station in Simferopol to Yalta (almost 90 km). Most of the tourists are from countries of the former Soviet Union; in 2013, about 12% of tourists to Crimea were Westerners from more than 200 cruise ships.

Yalta has a seafront promenade along the Black Sea. People can be seen strolling there all seasons of the year, and it also serves as a place to gather and talk, to see and be seen. There are several beaches to the east and west of the promenade. Many kinds of pine trees (Stone pine and Aleppo pine for example), oleander shrubs, lemon and olive trees and different sorts of palm trees such as the Chinese windmill palm, the Mexican fan palm and the Canary Island date palm are scattered all over the city. The town has several movie theaters, a drama theater, restaurants and open-air markets.

Two beaches in Yalta are Blue Flag beaches since May 2010, these were the first beaches (with two beaches in Yevpatoria) to be awarded a Blue Flag in a CIS member state.

== Main sights ==
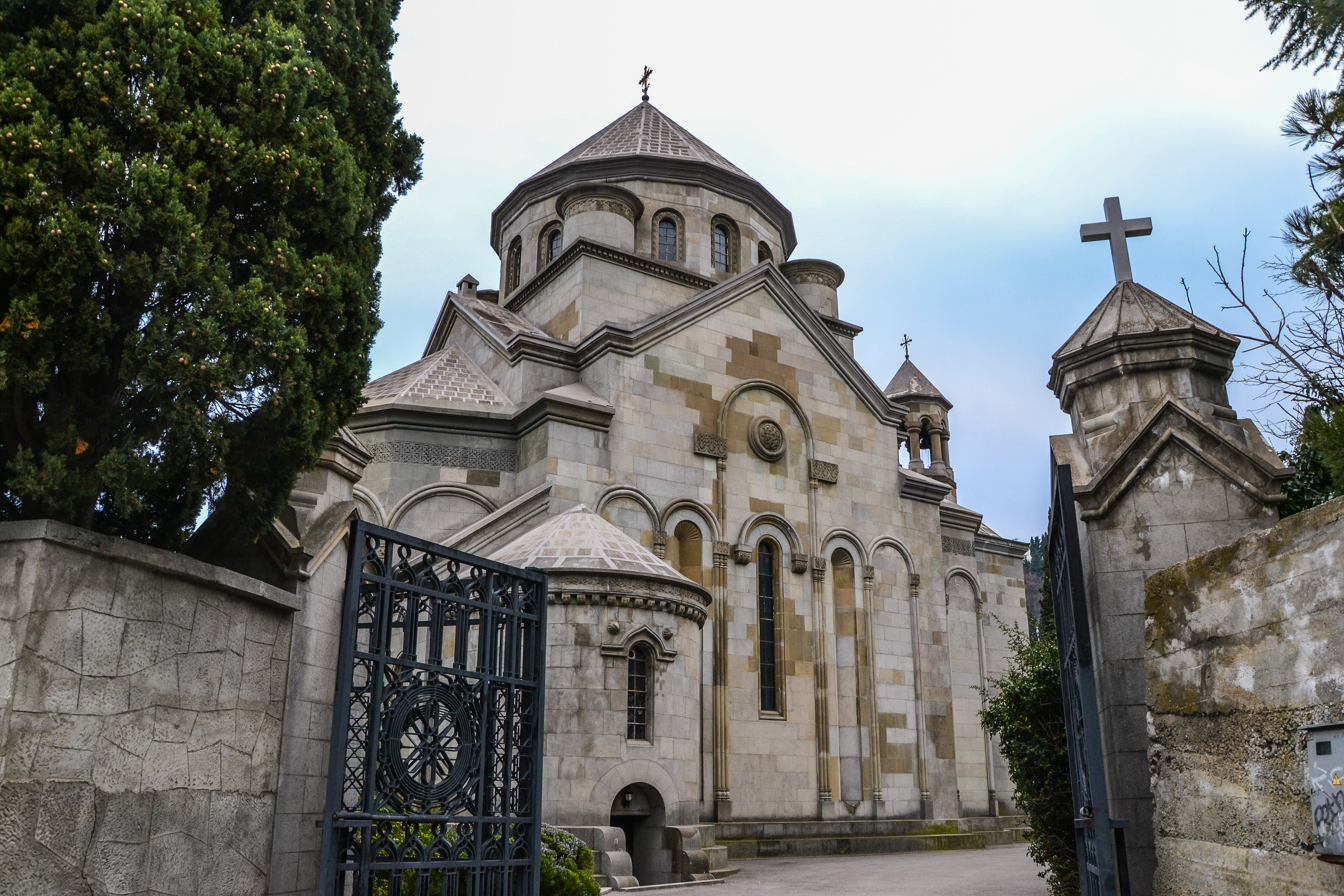
Saint Hripsime Church of Yalta

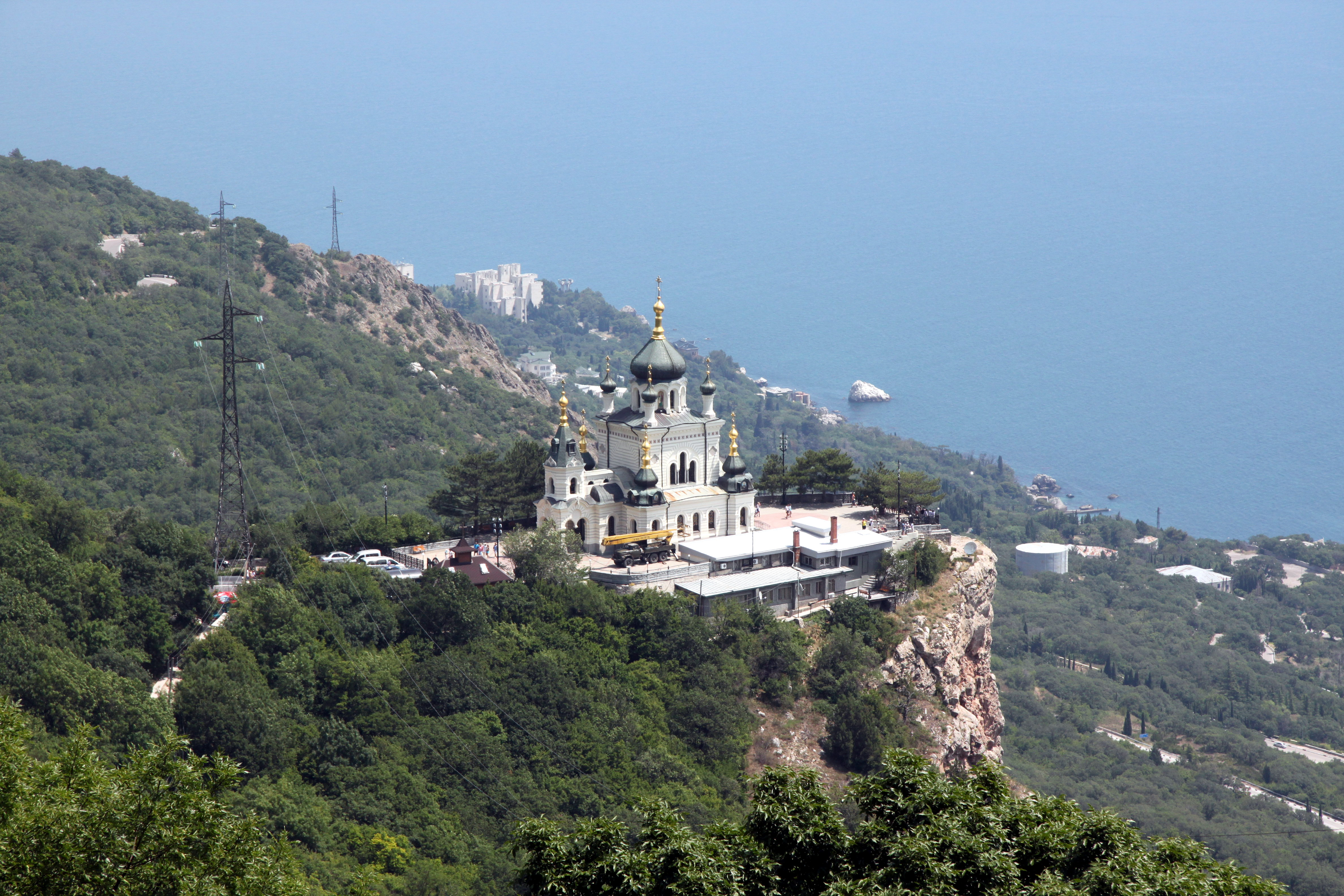
Foros Church is a popular wedding location

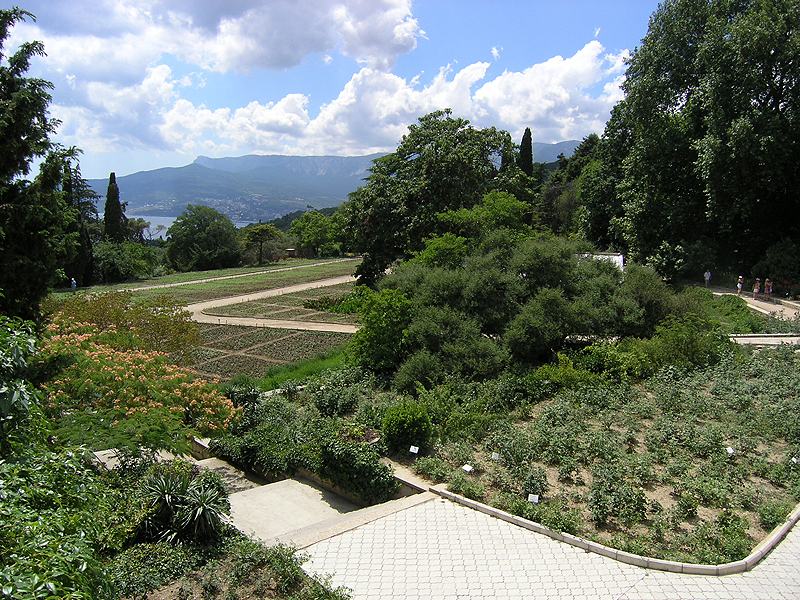
Nikitsky Botanical Garden

Famous attractions within or near Yalta are:

- Yalta's Sea Promenade (Naberezhnaya), housing many attractions, which was renovated in 2003 and 2004
- Saint Hripsime Church of Yalta, an Armenian Church, with frescoes by V. Surenyants
- A Roman Catholic Church built by Nikolay Krasnov
- Yalta's cable car, taking visitors to the Darsan hill, from which one can see Yalta's shoreline
- Renovated Hotel Taurica, the first hotel in the former Russian Empire with elevators
- Alexander Nevsky Cathedral, constructed by the architect Krasnov, who also constructed the Livadia Palace and the architect P. Terebenyov
- Former main building of the Ministry of Defence hotel, built in the style of a Gothic castle
- Palace of Bukhara Emir
- Yalta's Zoo
- Yalta's Aquarium, housing small dolphins
- Park-museum Polyana Skazok (Glade of Fairytales)
- White Dacha – House-museum of Anton Chekhov
- House-museum of Lesya Ukrainka at Lesya Ukrainka Museum
- House with Caryatids, where the composer A. Spendiarov lived
- Yalta Intourist, the largest hotel in Ukraine
- Roffe Bath, historical monument

Moreover, Yalta's suburbs contain:

- Foros Church
- Nikitsky Botanical Garden (Nikita)
- Livadia Palace (Livadiya)
- Organ hall in Livadiya
- Massandra Palace (Massandra)
- Massandra Winery and Vaults
- International children's centre of Artek (Gurzuf)
- Ai-Petri Mountain (1233 metres high, with a cable car traveling to and from the mountain)
- Alupka Palace
- Swallow's Nest castle near Gaspra.
- Tsar's Path hiking trail

== Geography ==
=== Climate ===
As Yalta lies to the south of the Crimean Mountains and within an amphitheatre of hills, the climate is mild. Köppen classifies the city as humid subtropical (Cfa), bordering on a Mediterranean climate (Köppen climate classification: Csa); while the city's Trewartha class is oceanic (Do), barely missing the criteria for humid subtropical (Cf). In February, the average temperature reaches 4 °C (39 °F). Snow is infrequent and melts soon thereafter. In July, the average temperature reaches 24 °C (75 °F). The average annual precipitation is 612 millimetres (24.1 in), most of it being concentrated in the colder months. The sun shines approximately 2,169 hours per year. Since the city is located on the shore of the Black Sea, the weather rarely becomes extremely hot due to the cool sea breezes. The average annual temperature for Yalta is around 14 °C (57 °F), which makes it one of the warmest places in Ukraine.

Climate data for Yalta (1991–2020 normals, extremes 1948–present)
Month	Jan	Feb	Mar	Apr	May	Jun	Jul	Aug	Sep	Oct	Nov	Dec	Year
Record high °C (°F)	17.8 (64.0)	20.2 (68.4)	27.8 (82.0)	28.5 (83.3)	33.0 (91.4)	35.0 (95.0)	39.1 (102.4)	39.1 (102.4)	33.2 (91.8)	31.5 (88.7)	25.2 (77.4)	22.0 (71.6)	39.1 (102.4)
Mean daily maximum °C (°F)	7.4 (45.3)	7.7 (45.9)	10.4 (50.7)	14.8 (58.6)	20.5 (68.9)	25.7 (78.3)	29.1 (84.4)	29.4 (84.9)	24.2 (75.6)	18.3 (64.9)	12.8 (55.0)	8.9 (48.0)	17.4 (63.3)
Daily mean °C (°F)	4.6 (40.3)	4.6 (40.3)	6.8 (44.2)	11.1 (52.0)	16.4 (61.5)	21.6 (70.9)	24.8 (76.6)	25.0 (77.0)	20.1 (68.2)	14.6 (58.3)	9.7 (49.5)	6.3 (43.3)	13.8 (56.8)
Mean daily minimum °C (°F)	2.5 (36.5)	2.2 (36.0)	4.1 (39.4)	8.1 (46.6)	13.1 (55.6)	18.1 (64.6)	21.1 (70.0)	21.5 (70.7)	16.8 (62.2)	11.7 (53.1)	7.2 (45.0)	4.1 (39.4)	10.9 (51.6)
Record low °C (°F)	−12.2 (10.0)	−12.3 (9.9)	−7.3 (18.9)	−3.8 (25.2)	2.8 (37.0)	7.8 (46.0)	12.4 (54.3)	10.0 (50.0)	3.9 (39.0)	−1.1 (30.0)	−8.9 (16.0)	−7.4 (18.7)	−12.3 (9.9)
Average precipitation mm (inches)	76 (3.0)	56 (2.2)	48 (1.9)	29 (1.1)	36 (1.4)	35 (1.4)	32 (1.3)	43 (1.7)	43 (1.7)	52 (2.0)	57 (2.2)	84 (3.3)	591 (23.3)
Average extreme snow depth cm (inches)	1 (0.4)	1 (0.4)	1 (0.4)	0 (0)	0 (0)	0 (0)	0 (0)	0 (0)	0 (0)	0 (0)	0 (0)	0 (0)	1 (0.4)
Average rainy days	14	12	13	12	11	10	8	7	10	10	12	15	134
Average snowy days	6	6	4	0.2	0	0	0	0	0	0	1	3	20
Average relative humidity (%)	76.2	74.1	71.9	71.3	70.3	66.3	61.3	60.4	64.8	71.9	75.0	75.5	69.9
Mean monthly sunshine hours	71	85	136	176	246	277	310	288	213	142	89	61	2,094
Source 1: Pogoda.ru.net
Source 2: NOAA (humidity and sun 1991–2020)

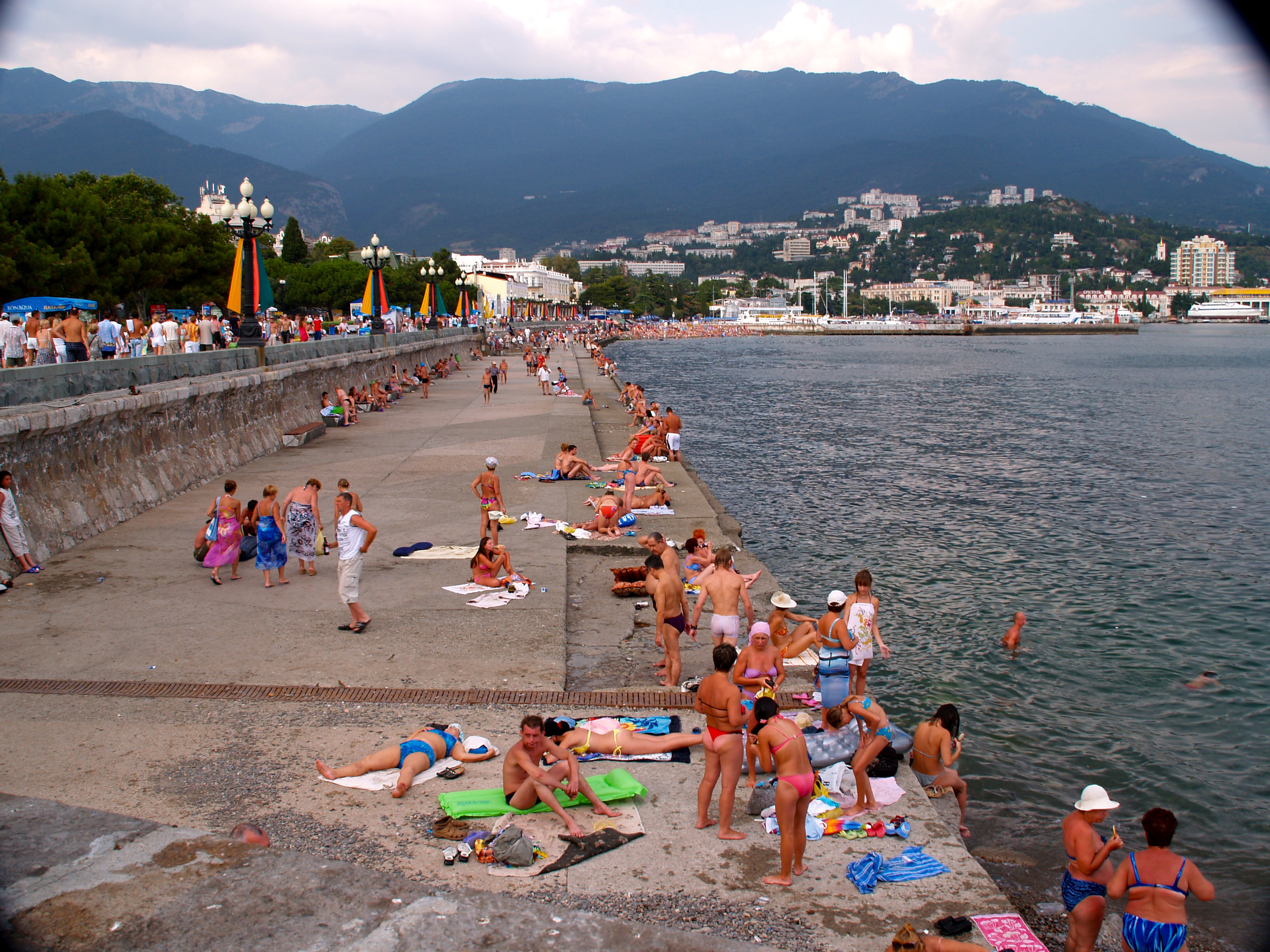
Boardwalk at Yalta

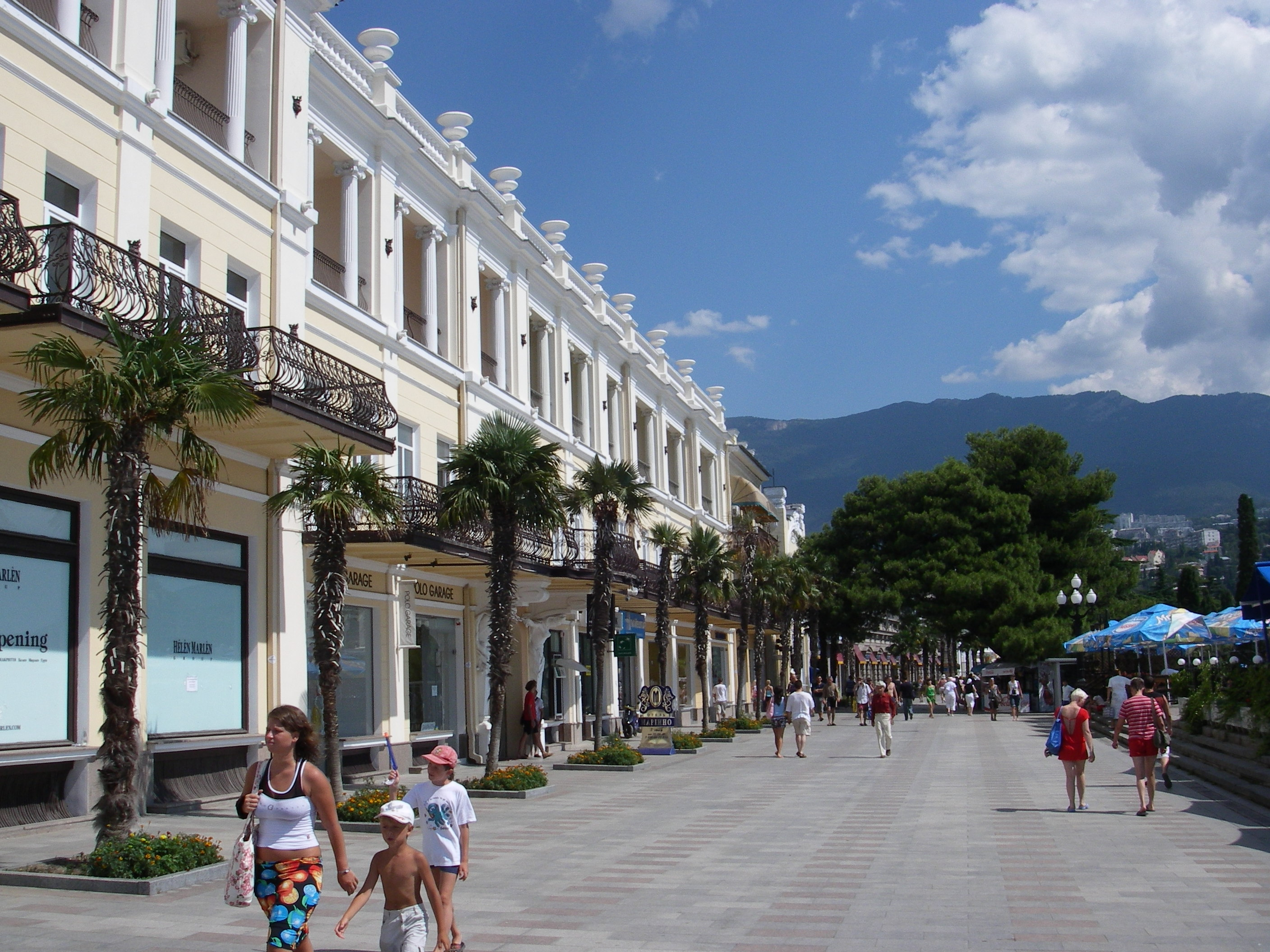
Yalta seafront promenade

== Demographics ==
Historical population
Year	Pop.	±% p.a.
1897	13,155	—
1923	18,345	+1.29%
1926	28,758	+16.17%
1939	32,683	+0.99%
1959	43,994	+1.50%
1970	62,170	+3.19%
1979	80,098	+2.86%
1989	88,549	+1.01%
1992	90,000	+0.54%
1998	86,000	−0.75%
2001	81,654	−1.71%
2003	80,979	−0.41%
2004	80,416	−0.70%
2005	80,140	−0.34%
2006	79,796	−0.43%
2007	79,380	−0.52%
2008	78,935	−0.56%
2009	78,584	−0.44%
2010	78,334	−0.32%
2011	78,034	−0.38%
2012	78,040	+0.01%
2013	78,115	+0.10%
2014	78,200	+0.11%
2020	79,056	+0.18%
2021	74,652	−5.57%
2025	72,013	−0.90%

As of the Ukrainian Census conducted on 1 January 2001, the population of Yalta is 80,500. The main ethnic groups of Yalta are: Russians (65.5%), Ukrainians (27.7%), Belarusians (1.6%), and Crimean Tatars (1.3%). In terms of spoken languages, the majority of the population speaks Russian (88.1%) as their mother tongue, followed by significant minorities of native Ukrainian (8.9%) and Crimean Tatar speakers (1.1%).

This total number does not comprise the population of neighbouring villages and small towns. The metropolitan area population is about 139,500.

== Sport ==
Yalta is home to FC Rubin Yalta which plays in the Russian Second League Division B. In 2005-2006 in Yalta existed the Anatoliy Zayayev club, FC Yalos Yalta.

== Twin towns – sister cities ==
Yalta is twinned with:

- Antalya, Turkey
- Baden-Baden, Germany
- (Georgia (country)) Batumi, Georgia
- Eilat, Israel
- Fujisawa, Japan
- Grozny, Russia
- Kaluga, Russia
- Santa Barbara, United States
- Khachmaz, Azerbaijan
- Latakia, Syria
- Luhansk, Ukraine
- Margate, England, United Kingdom
- Nice, France
- Pozzuoli, Italy
- Rhodes, Greece
- Salsomaggiore Terme, Italy
- Sanya, China
- Sharm El Sheikh, Egypt
- Ulan-Ude, Russia
- Vladikavkaz, Russia
- (Georgia (country)) Gagra, Georgia

== Notable people born in Yalta ==
- Oleksandr Lignau (1872–1938), Ukrainian general and first Minister of War of the Ukrainian State
- Alla Nazimova (1879–1945), Russian-American actress
- Viktor Kopp (1880–1930), Soviet diplomat of German ethnicity
- Louis Hofbauer (1889–1932), Austrian artist
- Serge Piménoff (1895–1960), French art director
- Nathalie Kovanko (1899–1967), Ukrainian actress
- Alla Horska (1929–1970), Ukrainian artist
- Antonina Rudenko (born 1950), Soviet-Ukrainian swimmer
- Nathalia Edenmont (born 1970), Ukrainian-Swedish artist
- Nika Turbina (1974–2002), Russian poet
- Julia Vakulenko (born 1983), Ukrainian tennis player
- Vera Rebrik (born 1989), Ukrainian-Russian track field athlete
- Peter Paltchik (born 1992), Ukrainian-born Israeli Olympic and European champion judoka
- Valentina Ivakhnenko (born 1993), Ukrainian-Russian tennis player

== See also ==
- List of cities in Ukraine
- Gulf of Yalta
