= Josef Haszpra =

Czech sculptor

Josef Haszpra (15 March 1882 – 21 November 1966) was a Czech-Slovak caster, who created or helped to create many statues in Central Europe, especially in Czechoslovakia, Yugoslavia and Austria.

== Life ==
Haszpra was born on 15 March 1882 in Nadošany (Hontnádas) in Kingdom of Hungary, Austria-Hungary (today Hontianske Trsťany, Slovakia). The family was one of smiths and passed the craft from father to son. His father was Herman (Armín) Haszpra and his mother was Marie Birovská.

When his family moved to Budapest just a few years after his birth, Haszpra had to attend Hungarian schools. He was trained as a caster and founder and worked first in Budapest, where his master craftsman took notice of his skills and assigned him to more complex works in founding and casting large bronze statues. After some time, he became a foreman and left with a group he was leading to Vienna, where they worked for the "Srpek a spol." company, again on creating large bronze statues. The company eventually moved to Brandýs nad Labem, a town in Bohemia in the vicinity of Prague, where a foundry was founded for casting the monument of Master Johannes Hus to be placed to Old Town's square in Prague. This foundry became later the foundation of the company Melichar a Umrath and today's Brandýské strojírny a slévárny. Haszpra created additional artistic works and trained new casters. While there, he also married to Růžena Homolová.

Just after the works were finished, Haspra traveled to Oslo, Norway with his wife and a one-year-old daughter. However, after just half a year, he had to return to Bohemia, due to the start of World War I. Haszpra had to serve in the Austrian-Hungarian army. He was injured twice.

After the war ended, Haszpra began working together with his associate Hibala in the foundry in Brandýs nad Labem. Some years after, they separated, and Josef Haszpra joined the company Mašek a spol. in Prague. In the critical times of the Great Depression, whose victim he also became, he took any job to feed his family. A lucky chance helped him, since at that time, the famous Croatian sculptor and architect Ivan Meštrović came to Czechoslovakia to fetch him and take him to Yugoslavia for cooperation of creating bronze statues together. He went there twice and left a couple of artistic works.

When the economic situation in Czechoslovakia partially calmed down, Haszpra opened a workshop, where he first worked alone. The beginnings were difficult. After a few years he started to break through and thus started an intensive cooperation on works of famous sculptors (Myslbek, Štursa, Šaloun, Louda, Benda, Pokorný, Lidický, Kodet and many others). He was also accepting orders from Slovakia, from sculptors such as Gibala, Trizuliak, Štefunka and others. Shortly before World War II he created a 4-meter-tall (13 ft) statue of general Milan Rastislav Štefánik.

After the occupation of Bohemia and Moravia by Hitler's Germany, casting from non-iron metals was banned. It was difficult times for the whole Haszpra's family. After the war ended, Haszpra could have resumed work and in 1947 he got the order to found a statue of Tomáš Garrigue Masaryk in Brandýs nad Labem. This statue was removed in 1956 by command of the local communist party.

In the middle of the 1950s Haspra trained casters founders in the Bratislava Research Institute for Founding. In 1958 the ministry officials asked Haszpra to cast several pieces of art for the World Expo in Brussels. Statues of the sculptor Lauda, which he cast in bronze in an extremely short time and without proper equipment, met with a great success in Brussels.

Josef Haszpra died on 21 November 1966 in Brandýs nad Labem, where he was buried. He left behind him his wife and two children.

== Work ==
Josef Haszpra created or helped to create many statues in Central Europe, especially in the former Czechoslovakia, Yugoslavia and Austria. Among his most important works are:

- Monument of Johannes Hus on Old Town's Square in Prague (1915)
- Statue of T. G. Masaryka in Brandýs nad Labem (1947)
- Statue "Becoming Brothers" of sculptor Pokorný in Česká Třebová (reused on former 50 crowns banknotes)
- Statue for the World Expo in Brussels of sculptor Lauda (1958)
