= Gaspra =

Town in Yalta Municipality, Crimea

Gaspra Гаспра
- Haspra
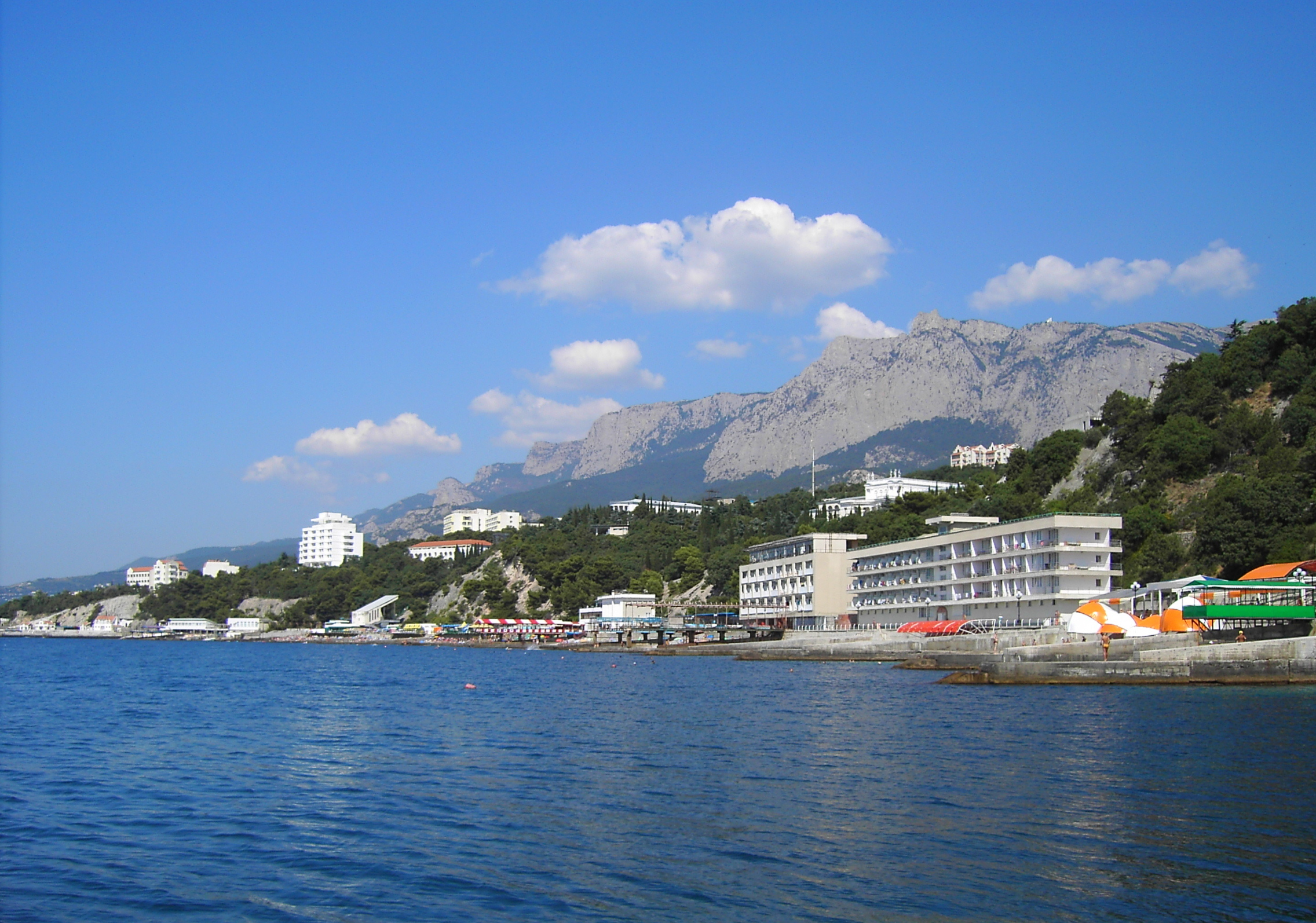

- Flag Coat of arms

- Location of Gaspra within the Crimea Gaspra (Crimea)
- Coordinates: 44°26′10″N 34°6′38″E
- Country: Ukraine (occupied by Russia)
- Autonomous republic: Crimea (de jure)
- Raion: Yalta Raion (de jure)
- Federal subject: Crimea (de facto)
- Municipality: Yalta Municipality (de facto)

Government
  - Mayor: Oleh Ihorovych Zemlyanyi
- Elevation: 50 m (160 ft)

Population (2014)
  - Total: 10,310
- Time zone: UTC+4 (MSK)
- Postal code: 98660 — 98669
- Area code: +380-654
- Climate: Cfb

Gaspra (Ukrainian: Гаспра; Russian: Гаспра; Crimean Tatar: Gaspra; from Greek ἄσπρα áspra, 'white'), officially transliterated Haspra, is a spa town, an urban-type settlement in Yalta Municipality in the Autonomous Republic of Crimea. It is located on the Black Sea coast, west of Yalta, and is a popular holiday resort. Population: 10,310 (2014 Census).

Leo Tolstoy lived in Gaspra in 1901 and 1902. Nearby are the Swallow's Nest, a modern castle, and Charax, Crimea a Roman fort.

The asteroid 951 Gaspra is named after the town.

== History ==
In the 70s of the second century - the first half of the third century, there was a fortress of Haraks (on the site of an ancient Taurian settlement), the largest base of Roman troops in the Crimea. In the Middle Ages, it was a zone of Greek colonization (Gaspra from the Greek "aspro" - white). It has been known as a settlement since the mid-eighteenth century.

After the Crimean Khanate was incorporated into the Russian Empire (1783), the lands around Gaspra were distributed to Russian aristocrats (including members of the royal family), who built their own palaces here (the most famous is the so-called romantic Alexandria of Prince A. Golitsyn).

According to the 1897 census, the number of residents was 695 (403 men and 292 women), of whom 84 were Orthodox and 605 were Mohammedans.

In 1911–1912, Baku oilman Baron V. Steingel built the so-called castle of love, known as the Swallow's Nest, on Cape Ai-Todor, one of the symbols of modern Crimea. Winemaking played a significant role in the economic development of the estate (Livadia's zone of influence).

In 1930, Gaspra was granted the status of an urban-type settlement. During the German-Soviet war, from November 1941 to April 1944, it was occupied by the Nazis.

The 1960s and 1970s saw the heyday of Gaspra as a resort. Today it is actually a single entity with the village of Koreiz and the resort area of Miskhor. On December 14, 2007, the Gaspra Village Council approved the modern coat of arms and flag of Gaspra.

== Climate ==
Gaspra has an oceanic climate (Köppen: Cfb).

Climate data for Gaspra
Month	Jan	Feb	Mar	Apr	May	Jun	Jul	Aug	Sep	Oct	Nov	Dec	Year
Daily mean °C (°F)	1.0 (33.8)	1.6 (34.9)	4.0 (39.2)	9.8 (49.6)	14.8 (58.6)	18.9 (66.0)	21.4 (70.5)	20.9 (69.6)	16.7 (62.1)	11.8 (53.2)	7.5 (45.5)	3.7 (38.7)	11.0 (51.8)
Average precipitation mm (inches)	67 (2.6)	50 (2.0)	43 (1.7)	36 (1.4)	41 (1.6)	53 (2.1)	44 (1.7)	43 (1.7)	40 (1.6)	40 (1.6)	53 (2.1)	77 (3.0)	587 (23.1)
Source: Climate-Data.org

== Demographics ==
As of the 2001 Ukrainian census, Haspra had a population of 10,178 inhabitants. Despite the town being mostly Russophone, it is estimated that Ukrainians make up a slim plurality in the settlement, closely followed by a large minority of ethnic Russians. Smaller minorities are Crimean Tatars, Belarusians and Armenians. The primary language composition was as follows:

First languages in Haspra
	percent
Russian	80.7%
Ukrainian	15.6%
Crimean Tatar	1.0%
Armenian	0.5%
Belarusian	0.2%
others	0.8%

=== Historical population data ===
During the first Soviet census in 1926, the authorities registered 696 inhabitants. 534 were Crimean Tatars, 91 Ukrainians, 36 Russians and 31 Greeks.

1926 Soviet census
	percent
Crimean Tatars	76.72%
Ukrainians	13.07%
Russians	5.17%
Greeks	4.45%
others	0.59%

== Notable landmarks ==
Tourist attractions in the vicinity include the Roman castrum of Charax and the romantic castle of Swallow's Nest.

== People from Gaspra ==
- Ismail Gasprinski, Crimean Tatar intellectual, educator, publisher and politician.

== Twin towns — sister cities ==
- Tirilye, Turkey
