= Charax, Crimea =

Roman military settlement in Crimea

Charax
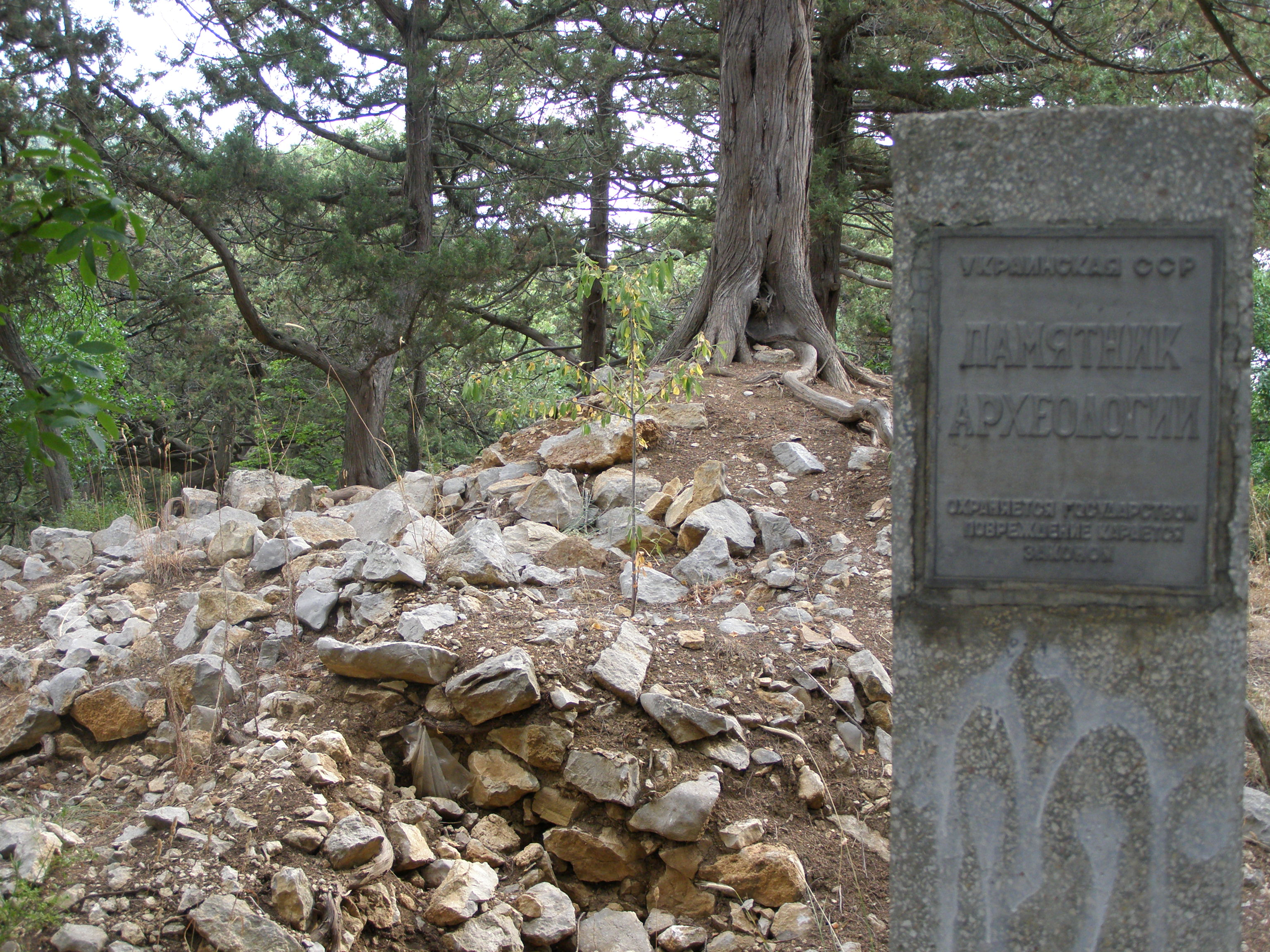
- Charax site
- Interactive map of Charax
- 44°25′45″N 34°07′19″E

Immovable Monument of National Significance of Ukraine
- Official name: Археологічний комплекс "Фортеця Харакс" (Charax Fortress archaeological complex)
- Type: Archaeology
- Reference no.: 010035-Н

Charax (Ancient Greek: Χάραξ, gen.: Χάρακος) is the largest Roman military settlement excavated in the Crimea. It was sited on a four-hectare area at the western ridge of Ai-Todor, close to the modern tourist attraction of Swallow's Nest.

The military camp was founded under Vespasian with the intention of protecting Chersonesus and other Bosporean trade emporiums from the Scythians. By the end of the 1st century AD, the Roman forces were evacuated from the peninsula. Several decades later the camp was restored by a vexillatio of the Legio I Italica; it hosted a detachment of the Legio XI Claudia at the end of the 2nd century. The camp was abandoned by the Romans in the mid-3rd century.

The ruins of the camp were discovered by Peter Keppen in 1837; he estimated the length of the defensive wall at 185 sazhens (395 metres). Keppen identified the site with Charax (from the Greek word for "fortification"), the only Roman camp recorded in Crimea. Although there is no evidence that Charax was situated near Ai-Todor, the name stuck. Intrigued by Keppen's publication, Count Shuvalov funded the first (and rather amateurish) excavations of the site in 1849.

In 1896, excavations were resumed under the supervision of Grand Duke Alexander Mikhailovich of Russia, who had his summer dacha constructed in the immediate vicitinity of the ruins and the 1865 lighthouse. The excavations lasted for fifteen years and yielded a great number of Roman coins and bronze artifacts. Michael Rostovtzeff, who oversaw the excavations on behalf of the St. Petersburg University, classed Charax as an "entire Roman city", rather than just a fort, as was previously thought. A museum of archaeological finds was opened at Charax in 1907.

Further exploration of the site, undertaken by Vladimir Blavatsky in 1931–35, revealed remains of two public water basins, thermae, and an aqueduct. There were also a gymnasium and a sanctuary outside the walls. Blavatsky and his followers lent their support to Rostovtzeff's theory that the most ancient line of cyclopean walls at Charax was erected by the Tauri before the arrival of Romans, a theory which since lost much of its popularity. They also hypothesized that the castrum had been slighted by retreating Roman soldiers, in order to avoid its seizure and use by the enemy.
