= Sevastopol =

Largest city on the Crimean peninsula

Sevastopol: Севастополь (Ukrainian); Севастополь (Russian); Акъяр / Aqyar (Crimean Tatar)
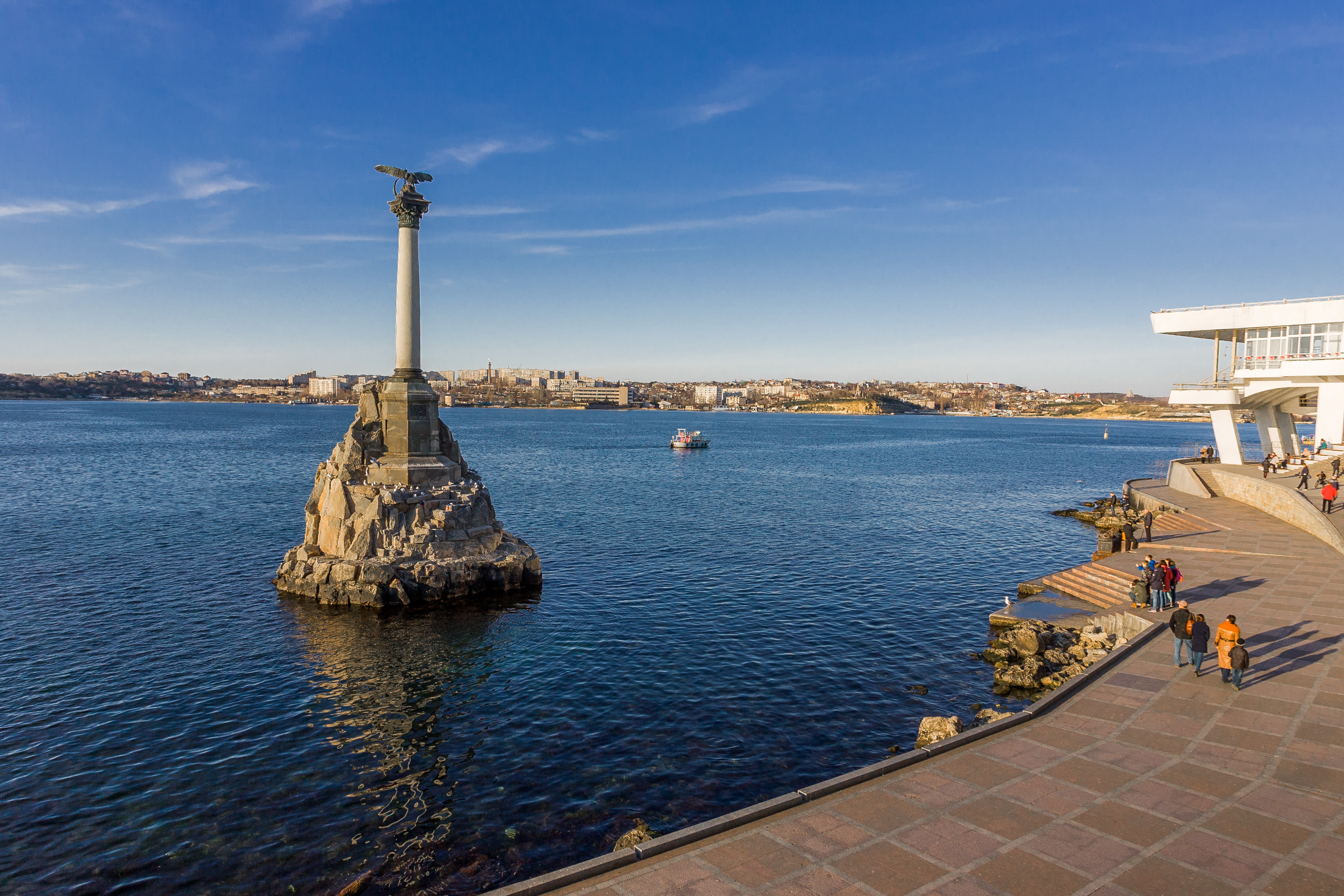
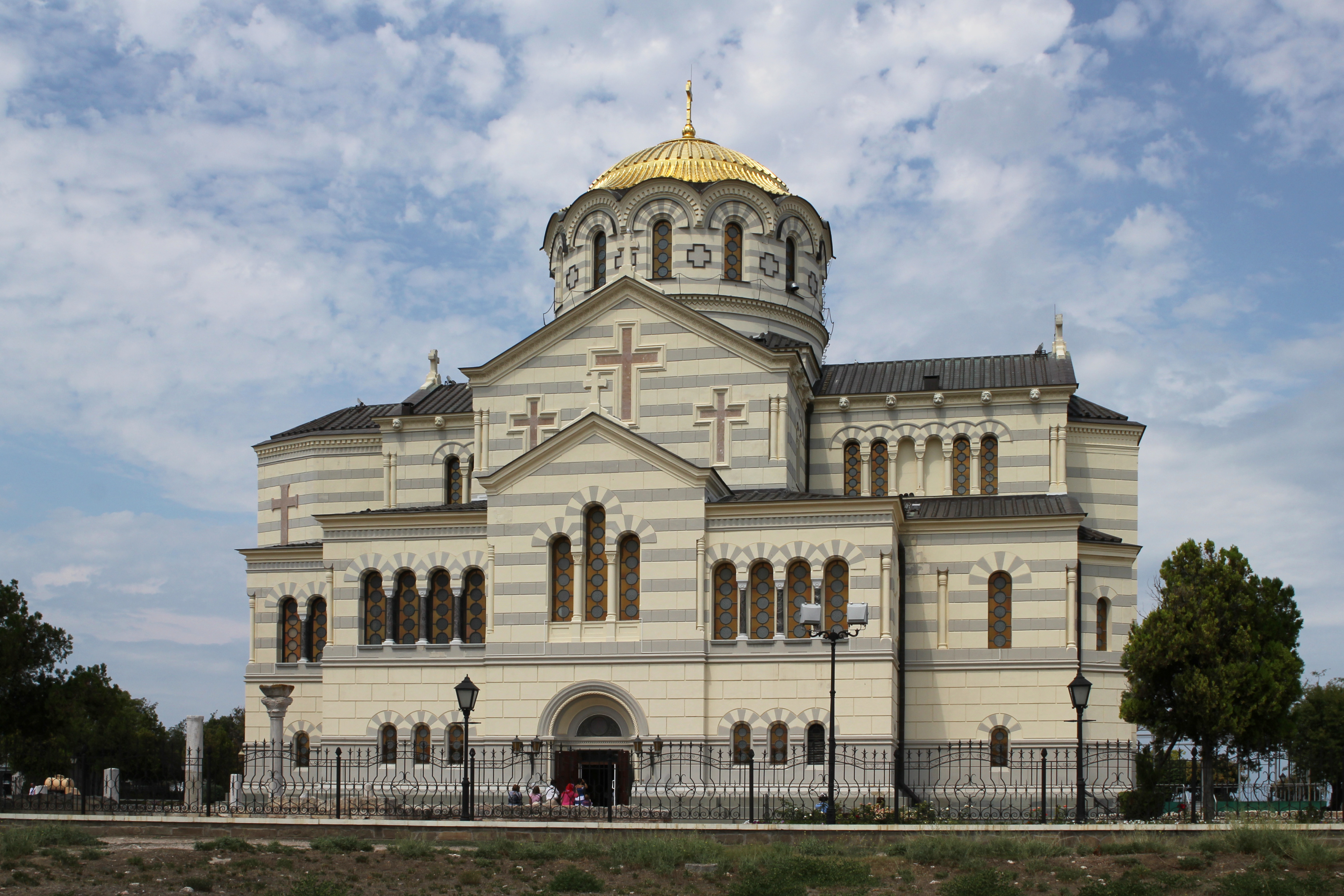
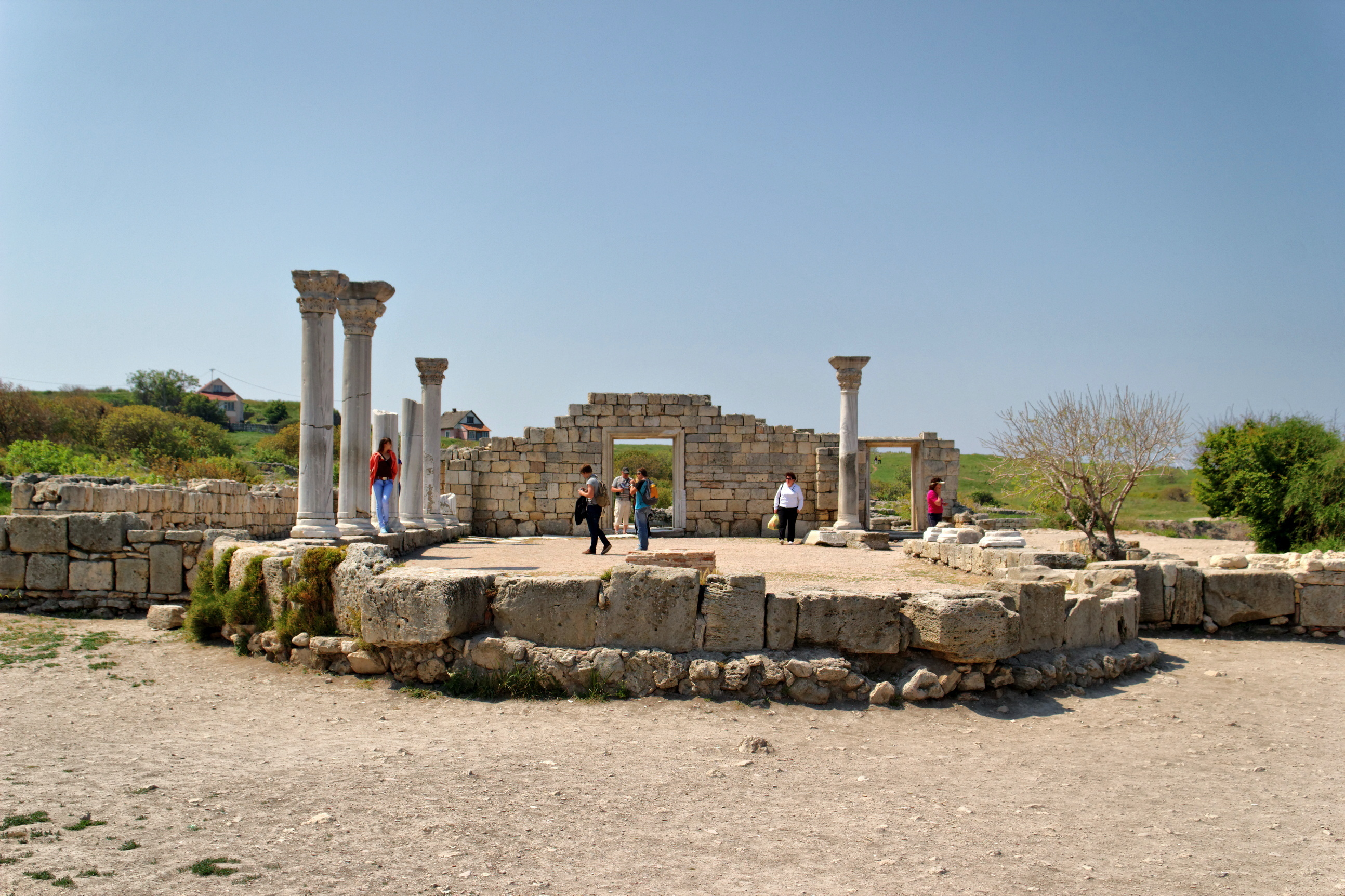
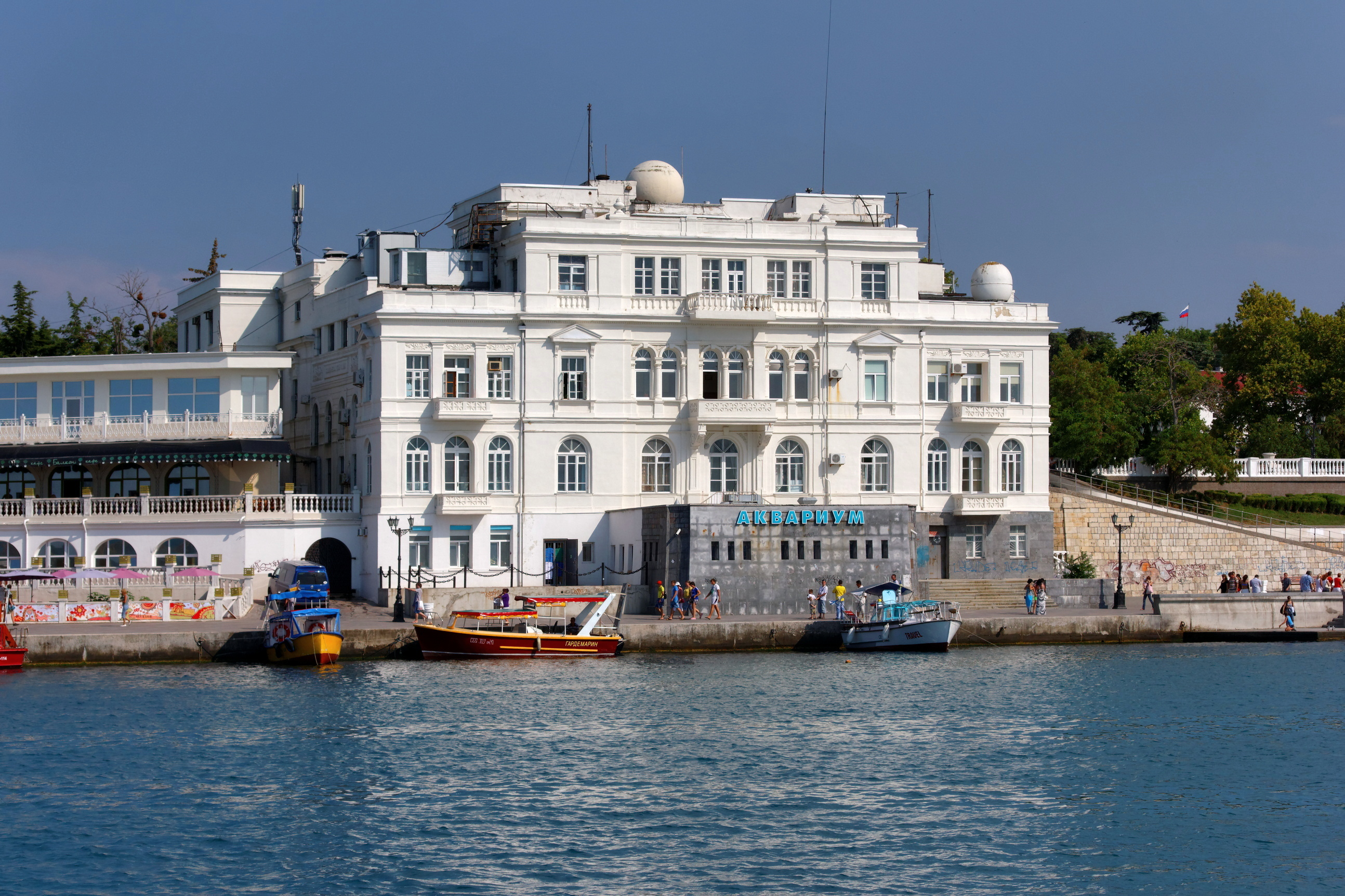
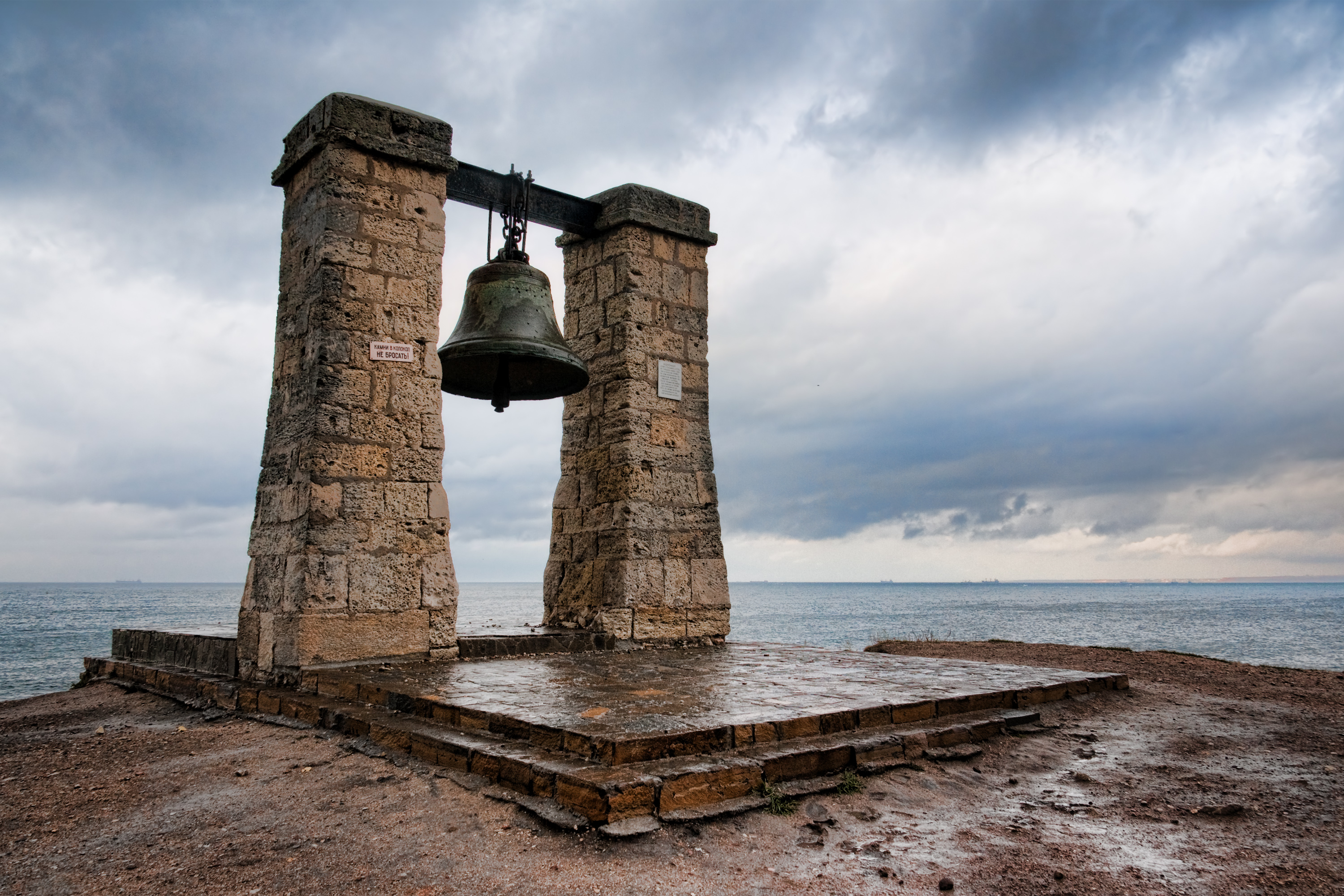
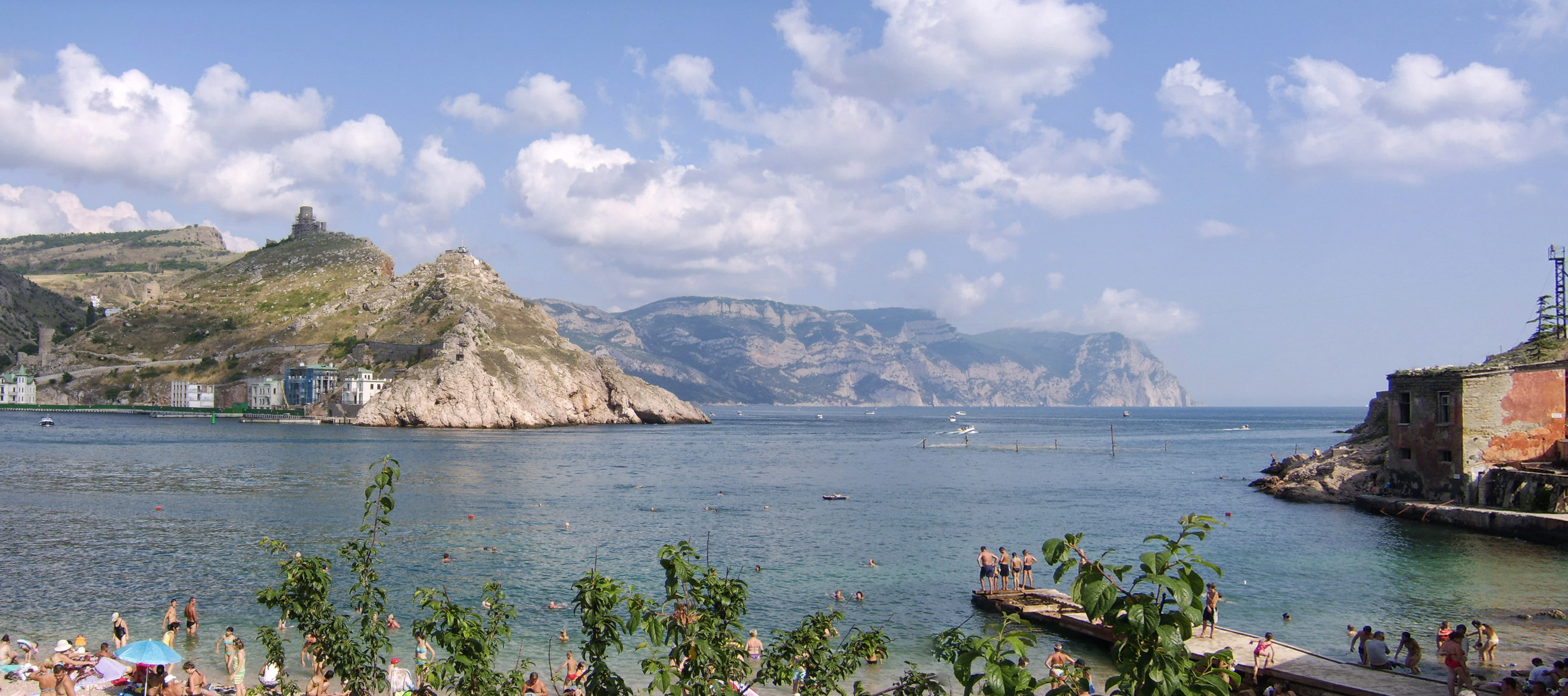
- Monument to the Sunken Ships Chersonesus Cathedral Basilica of 1935 in Chersonesus Institute of Biology of the Southern Seas Bell of Chersonesos View of Balaklava Bay

- Flag Coat of arms
- Anthem: "Легендарный Севастополь" (Russian) (English: "Legendary Sevastopol")
- Orthographic projection of Sevastopol (in green)

- Map of the Crimean Peninsula with Sevastopol highlighted
- Interactive map of Sevastopol
- Location of Sevastopol within Crimea Location of Sevastopol within Ukraine Location of Sevastopol within Europe Sevastopol (Europe)
- Coordinates: 44°36′18″N 33°31′21″E
- Country (de facto): Russia
- Federal Subject (Federal City) (de facto): Sevastopol
- Federal District (de facto): Southern
- Economic Region (de facto): North Caucasus
- Country (de jure): Ukraine
- City with special status (de jure): Sevastopol
- Founded: 1783 (243 years ago)

Government (Russia (de facto))
  - Body: Legislative Assembly
  - Governor: Mikhail Razvozhayev

Area
  - City: 864 km^{2} (334 sq mi)
- Elevation: 100 m (330 ft)

Population (2021)
  - City: 547,820
  - Density: 634/km^{2} (1,640/sq mi)
  - Urban: 479,394
- Demonym(s): Sevastopolitan, Sevastopolian

GDP (nominal, 2024)
  - City: ₽253 billion (US$2.97 billion)
  - Per capita: ₽452,270 (US$5,307.03)
- Time zone: UTC+3 (MSK)
- Vehicle registration: 92, 192
- OKTMO ID: 67000000
- NUTS statistical regions of Ukraine: UA45
- Website: sev.gov.ru

Sevastopol (/ˌsɛvəˈstoʊpəl, səˈvæstəpoʊl/ SEV-ə-STOH-pəl, sə-VAS-tə-pohl), (Note: Ukrainian: Севастополь, IPA: [sewɐˈstɔpolʲ]; Russian: Севастополь, IPA: [sʲɪvɐˈstopəlʲ]; Medieval Greek: Σεβαστούπολις, romanised: Sevastoúpolis, IPA: [sevasˈtupolis]; Crimean Tatar: Акъяр, romanized: Aqyar, pronounced [ɑqˈjɑɾ].) sometimes written Sebastopol, is the largest city in Crimea and a major port on the Black Sea. Due to its strategic location and the navigability of the city's harbours, Sevastopol has been an important port and naval base throughout its history. Since the city's founding by Catherine the Great in 1783, it has been a major base for Russia's Black Sea Fleet. During the Cold War of the 20th century, it was a closed city. The total administrative area is 864 square kilometres (334 sq mi) and includes a significant amount of rural land. The urban population, largely concentrated around Sevastopol Bay, is 479,394, and the total population is 547,820.

Sevastopol, along with the rest of Crimea, is internationally recognised as part of Ukraine, and under the Ukrainian legal framework, it is administratively one of two cities with special status (the other being Kyiv). However, it has been occupied by Russia since 27 February 2014, before Russia annexed Crimea on 18 March 2014 and gave it the status of a federal city of Russia. Both Ukraine and Russia consider the city administratively separate from the Autonomous Republic of Crimea and the Republic of Crimea, respectively. The city's population has an ethnic Russian majority and a substantial minority of Ukrainians.

Sevastopol's unique naval and maritime features have been the basis for a robust economy. The city enjoys mild winters and moderately warm summers, characteristics that help make it a popular seaside resort and tourist destination, mainly for visitors from the former Soviet republics. The city is also an important centre for marine biology research. In particular, the military has studied and trained dolphins in the city for military use since the 1960s.

== Etymology ==
The name of Sevastopolis was originally chosen following the same etymological trend as other cities in the Crimean peninsula; it was intended to express its ancient Greek origins. It is a compound of the Greek adjective, σεβαστός (sebastós, Byzantine Greek pronunciation: [sevasˈtos]; 'venerable') and the noun πόλις (pólis, 'city'). Σεβαστός is the traditional Greek equivalent (see Sebastian) of the Roman honorific Augustus, originally given to the first emperor of the Roman Empire, Augustus and later awarded as a title to his successors.

The city was probably named after Empress ("Augusta") Catherine II of the Russian Empire who founded Sevastopol in 1783. She visited the city in 1787, accompanied by Joseph II, the Emperor of Austria, and other foreign dignitaries.

In the west of the city, there are well-preserved ruins of the ancient Greek port city of Chersonesos, founded in the 5th century BC by settlers from Heraclea Pontica. This name means "peninsula", reflecting its immediate location. It is not related to the ancient Greek name for the Crimean Peninsula as a whole: Chersonēsos Taurikē ("the Taurian Peninsula").

The name of the city is spelled as:

- English: Sevastopol, the current prevalent spelling; the previously common spelling Sebastopol is still used by some publications, and formerly by The Economist. The current spelling has the pronunciation /ˌsɛvəˈstoʊpəl, -ˈstɒpəl, sɪˈvæstəpəl, -pɒl, -poʊl/, while the former spelling has the pronunciation /sɪˈbæstəpəl, -pɒl, -poʊl/.
- Ukrainian: Севасто́поль, pronounced [sewɐˈstɔpolʲ], or Sivastopol; Russian: Севасто́поль, pronounced [sʲɪvɐˈstopəlʲ].
- Crimean Tatar: Aqyar, pronounced [aqˈjar]

== History ==
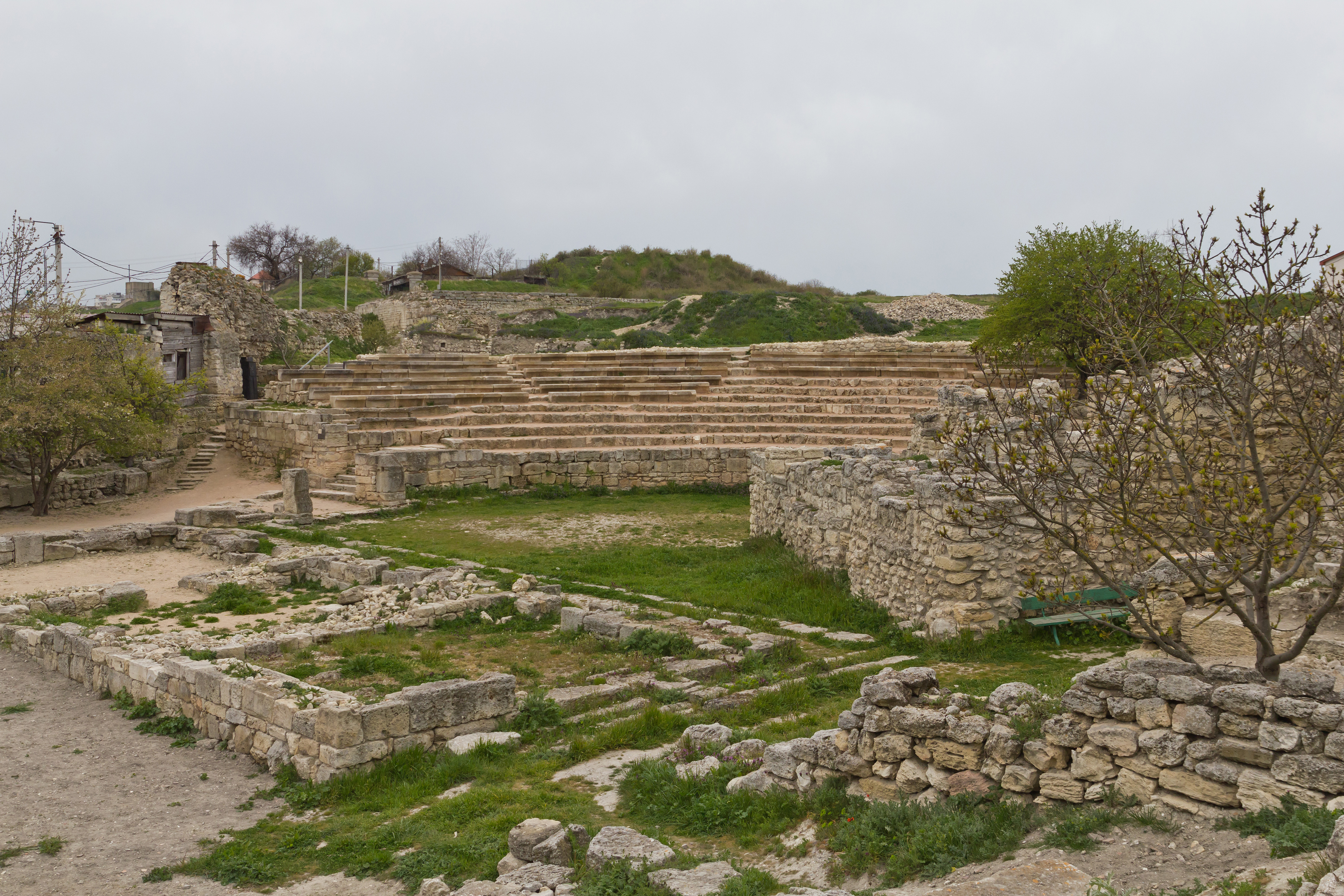
The ruins of the ancient Greek theatre in Chersonesos Taurica

Historical affiliations

Chersonesus founded in 6th century BC
Hellenic Colonies 6th century BC – 480 BC
Bosporan Kingdom 480 BC – 107 BC
Kingdom of Pontus 107 BC – 63 BC
Roman Republic 63 BC – 27 BC
Roman Empire 27 BC – 330
Byzantine Empire 330 – 1204
Empire of Trebizond 1204 – 1461
Principality of Theodoro 1461 – 1475
Crimean Khanate 1475 – 1783 (Ottoman vassal from 1478 to 1774)
Founded as Sevastopol in 1783
Russian Empire 1783 – 1917
Russian Republic 1917
Russian SFSR (Soviet Union from 1922) 1917 – 1942
Nazi Germany 1942 – 1944 (de facto)
Russian SFSR (Soviet Union) 1944 – 1954
Ukrainian SSR (Soviet Union) 1954 – 1991
Ukraine 1991 – 2014 (de facto; de jure – 1991–present)
Russian Federation 2014 – present (de facto)

=== Founding of Russian city ===
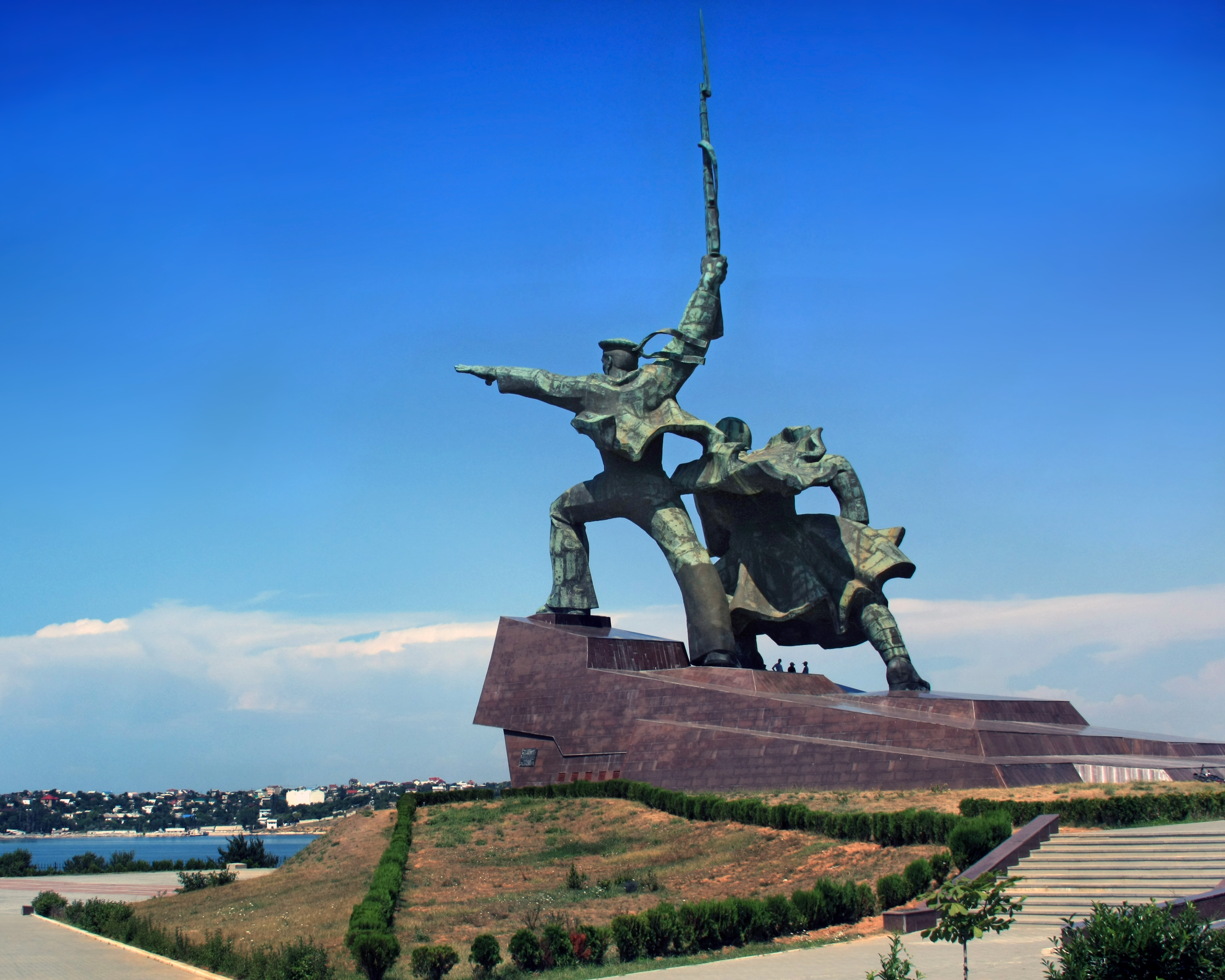
"Soldier and Sailor" Memorial to Heroic Defenders of Sevastopol

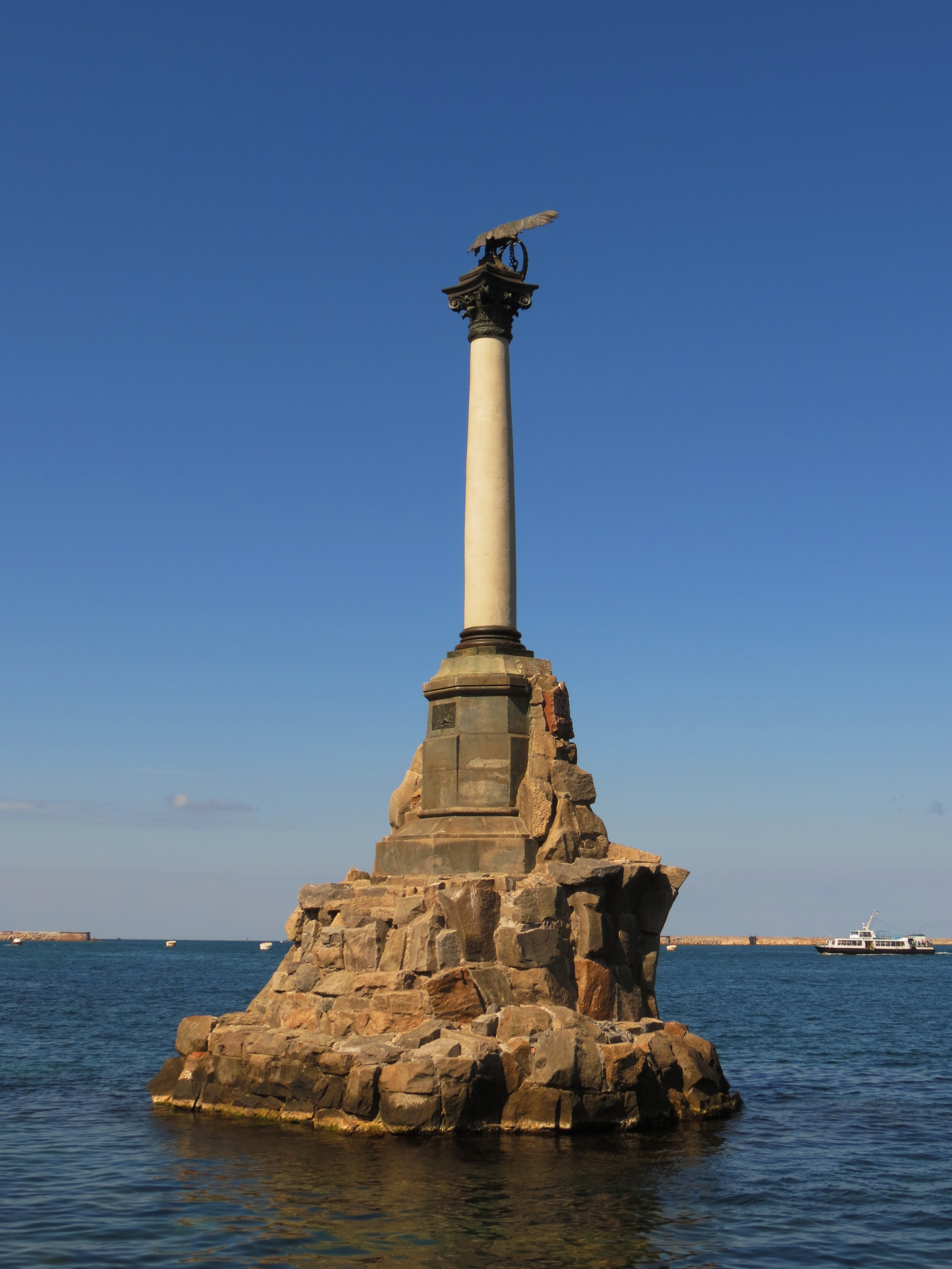
The Monument to the Sunken Ships, dedicated to ships scuttled during the siege of Sevastopol during the Crimean War, designed by Amandus Adamson

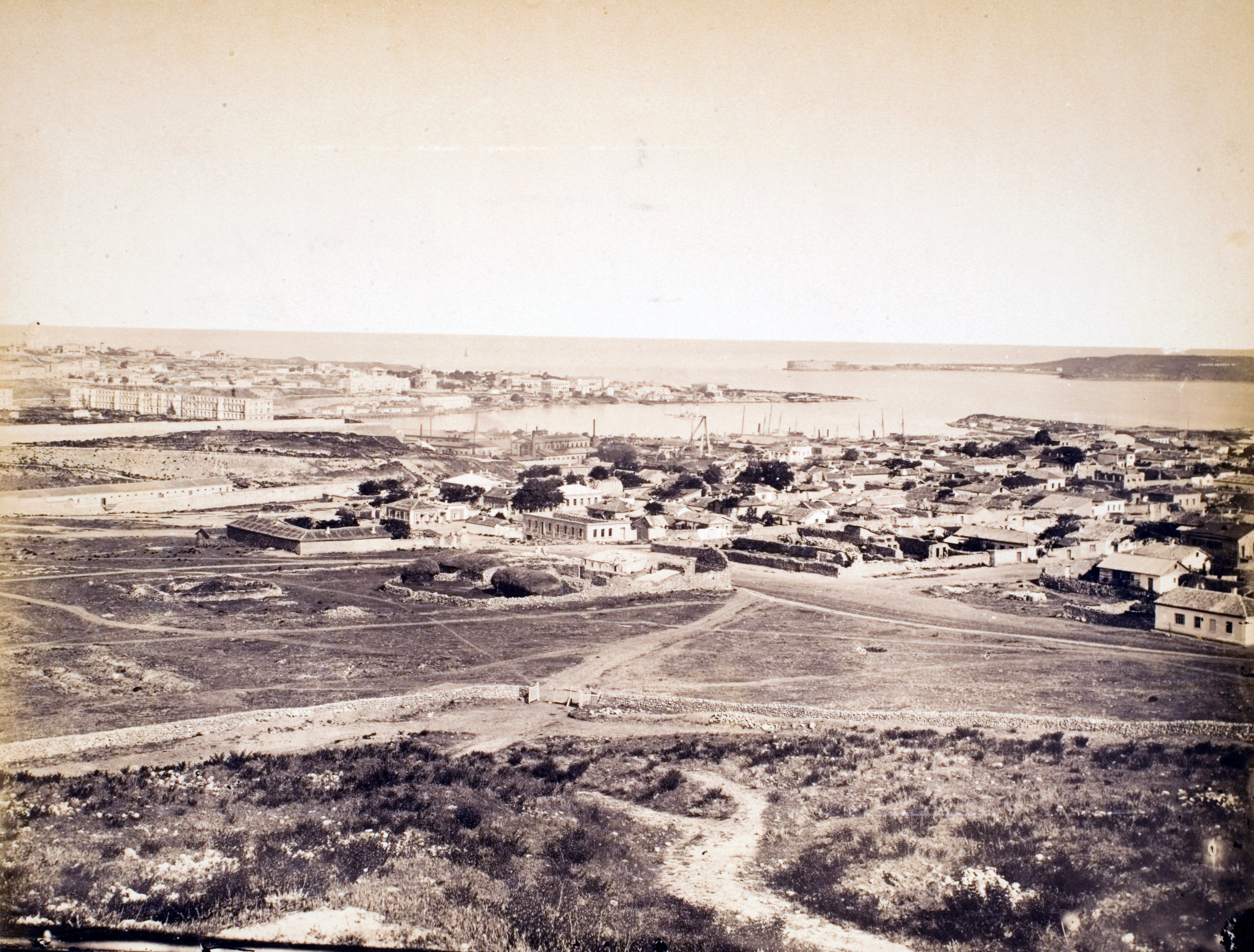
Sevastopol in 1889, Department of Image Collections, National Gallery of Art Library, Washington, D.C.

Sevastopol was founded in June 1783, in the area of the ancient but ruined and abandoned Greek city of Chersonesus, as a base for a naval squadron under the name Akhtiar (White Cliff), by Rear Admiral Thomas MacKenzie ("Foma Fomich Makenzi"), a native Scot in Russian service; soon after, the Russian Empire annexed the Crimean Khanate. Five years earlier, Alexander Suvorov had ordered that earthworks be erected along the harbour and Russian troops be placed there. The Crimean Tatar version of this name is now written Aqyar.

In February 1784, Catherine the Great ordered Grigory Potyomkin to build a fortress there and call it Sevastopol. The realisation of the initial building plans fell to Captain Fyodor Ushakov who in 1788 was named commander of the port and of the Black Sea squadron. The city was established on the western shore of Southern Bay which branches away from the bigger Sevastopol Bay. The ruins of ancient Chersonesus were situated to the west. The newly built settlement became an important naval base and later a commercial seaport. In 1797, under an edict issued by Emperor Paul I, the military stronghold was again renamed Akhtiar. Finally, on 29 April (10 May), 1826, the Senate returned the city's name to Sevastopol. In 1803 to 1864 along with Mykolaiv the city was part of Nikolayev–Sevastopol Military Governorate. The town had 3,000 inhabitants by the 1840s.

=== Crimean War ===
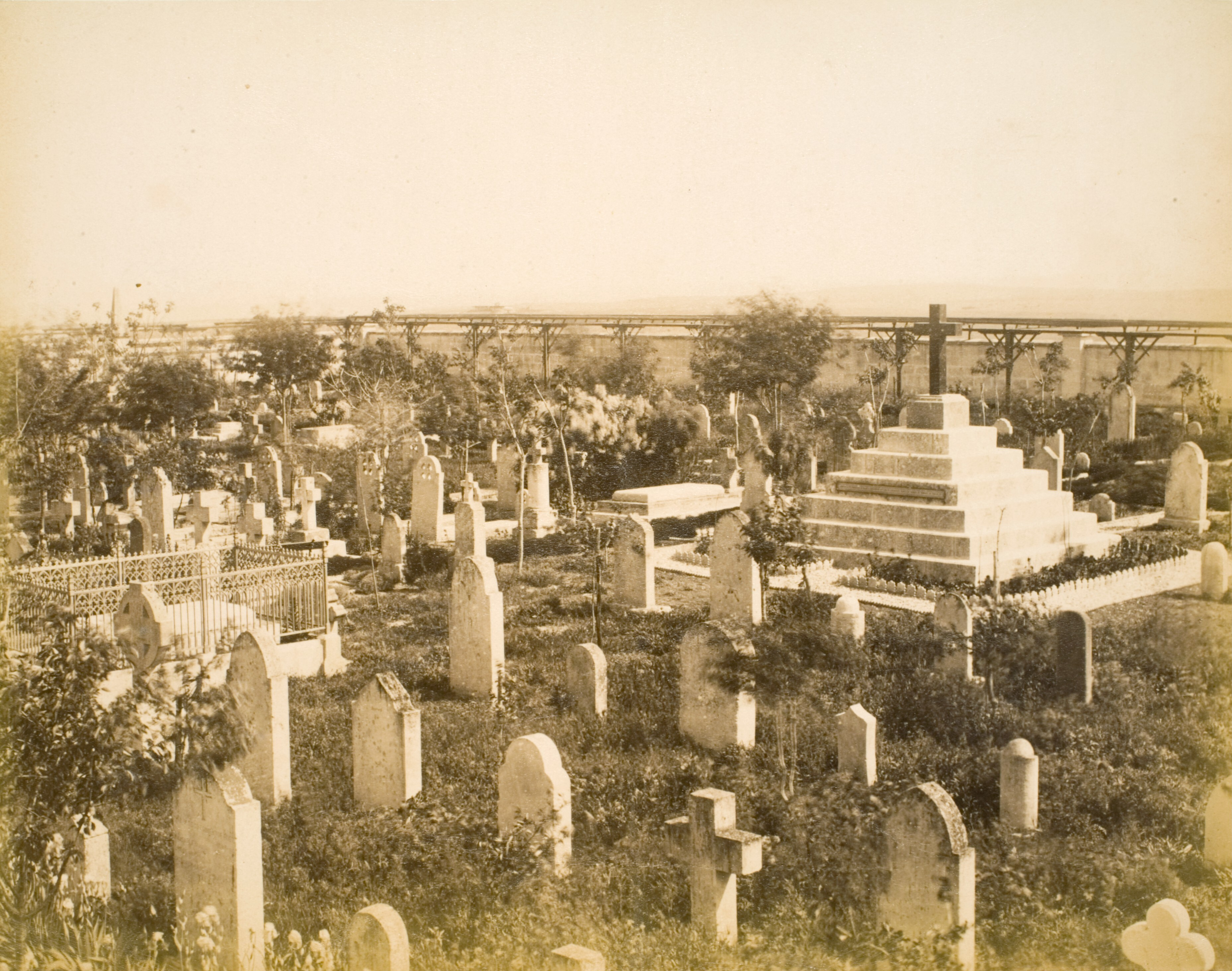
British Memorial Complex, Sevastopol, Department of Image Collections, National Gallery of Art Library, Washington, D.C.

From 1853 to 1856, the Crimean peninsula's strategic position in controlling the Black Sea caused it to be the site of the principal engagements of the Crimean War, where Russia lost to a French-led alliance.

After a minor skirmish at Köstence (now Constanța), the allied commanders decided to attack Sevastopol as Russia's main naval base in the Black Sea. After extended preparations, allied forces landed on the peninsula in September 1854 and marched to a point south of Sevastopol after winning the Battle of the Alma on 20 September. The Russians counterattacked on 25 October in what became the Battle of Balaclava and were repulsed, but the British Army's forces were seriously depleted as a result. A second Russian counterattack, at Inkerman in November, ended in a stalemate as well. The front settled into the siege of Sevastopol, involving brutal conditions for troops on both sides.

Sevastopol finally fell after eleven months, after the French had assaulted Fort Malakoff. Isolated and facing a bleak prospect of invasion by the West if the war continued, Russia sued for peace in March 1856. France and Britain welcomed the development, owing to the conflict's domestic unpopularity. The Treaty of Paris, signed on 30 March 1856, ended the war and forbade Russia from basing warships in the Black Sea. This hampered the Russians during the Russo-Turkish War of 1877–78 and in the aftermath of that conflict, Russia moved to reconstitute its naval strength and fortifications in the Black Sea.

=== World War II ===
During World War II, Sevastopol withstood intensive bombardment by the Germans in 1941–42, supported by their Italian and Romanian allies during the Battle of Sevastopol. German forces used railway artillery—including history's largest-ever calibre railway artillery piece in battle, the 80-cm calibre Schwerer Gustav—and specialised mobile heavy mortars to destroy Sevastopol's extremely heavy fortifications, such as the Maxim Gorky Fortresses. After fierce fighting, which lasted for 250 days, the fortress city finally fell to Axis forces in July 1942. It was intended to be renamed to "Theodorichshafen" (in reference to Theodoric the Great and the fact that Crimea had been home to Germanic Goths until the 18th or 19th century) in the event of a German victory against the Soviet Union, and like the rest of Crimea was designated for future colonisation by the Third Reich. It was liberated by the Red Army on 9 May 1944 and was awarded the Hero City title a year later.

=== Part of the Ukrainian SSR ===
During the Soviet era, Sevastopol became a so-called "closed city". This meant that any non-residents had to apply to the authorities for a temporary permit to visit the city.

On 29 October 1948, the Presidium of the Supreme Council of the Russian SFSR issued an ukaz (order) which confirmed the special status of the city. Soviet academic publications since 1954, including the Great Soviet Encyclopedia, indicated that Sevastopol, Crimean Oblast was part of the Ukrainian SSR.

In 1954, under Nikita Khrushchev, both Sevastopol and the remainder of the Crimean peninsula were administratively transferred from being territories within the Russian SFSR to being territories administered by the Ukrainian SSR. Administratively, Sevastopol was a municipality excluded from the adjacent Crimean Oblast. The territory of the municipality was 863.5 km^{2} and it was further subdivided into four raions (districts). Besides the City of Sevastopol proper, it also included two towns—Balaklava (having had no status until 1957), Inkerman, urban-type settlement Kacha, and 29 villages.

For the 1955 Ukrainian parliamentary elections on 27 February, Sevastopol was split into two electoral districts, Stalinsky and Korabelny (initially requested three Stalinsky, Korabelny, and Nakhimovsky). Eventually, Sevastopol received two people's deputies of the Ukrainian SSR elected to the Verkhovna Rada, A. Korovchenko and M. Kulakov.

In 1957, the town of Balaklava was incorporated into Sevastopol.

=== Part of Ukraine ===
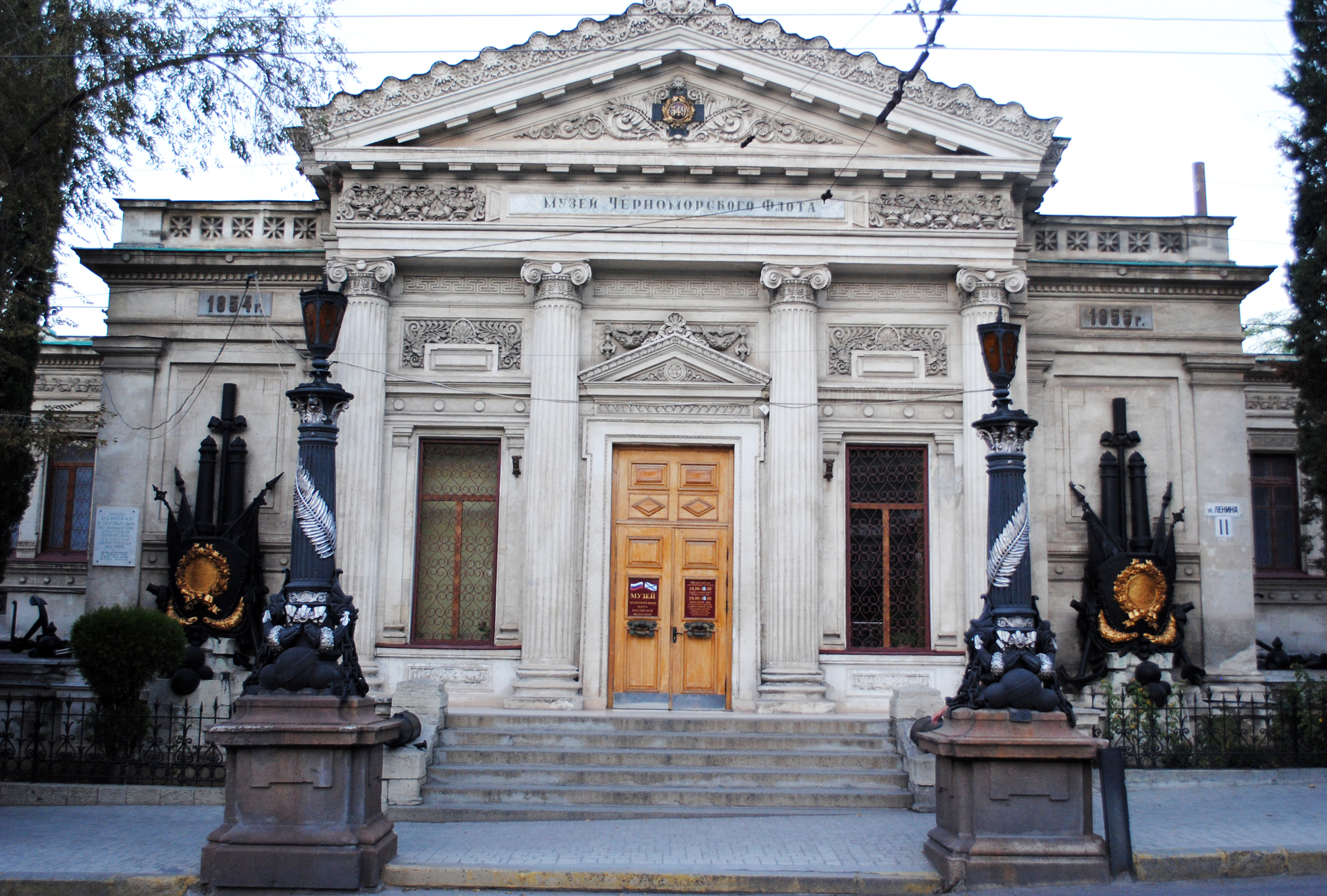
The Black Sea Fleet Museum

Following Ukraine's declaration of independence from the USSR in 1991, Sevastopol became the principal base of the Ukrainian navy. As the key naval base of the former Soviet Black Sea Fleet, it was a source of tensions for Russia–Ukraine relations until a set-term lease agreement was signed in 1997.

On 10 July 1993, the Russian parliament passed a resolution declaring Sevastopol to be "a federal Russian city". At the time, many supporters of President Boris Yeltsin had ceased taking part in the parliament's work. On 20 July 1993, the United Nations Security Council denounced the decision of the Russian parliament. According to Anatoliy Zlenko, it was the first time that the council had to review and qualify actions of a legislative body.

On 14 April 1993, the Presidium of the Crimean Parliament called for the creation of the presidential post of the Crimean Republic. A week later, the Russian deputy, Valentin Agafonov, said that Russia was ready to supervise a referendum on Crimean independence and include the republic as a separate entity in the CIS. On 28 July 1993, one of the leaders of the Russian Society of Crimea, Viktor Prusakov, said that his organisation was ready for an armed mutiny and the establishment of Russian administration of Sevastopol.

In September, the commander of the joint Russian-Ukrainian Black Sea Fleet, Eduard Baltin, accused Ukraine of converting some of his fleet and conducting an armed assault on his personnel and threatened to take countermeasures placing the fleet on alert. (In June 1992, the Russian president Yeltsin and the Ukrainian president Leonid Kravchuk had agreed to divide the former Soviet Black Sea Fleet between Russia and Ukraine. Eduard Baltin had been appointed commander of the Black Sea Fleet by Yeltsin and Kravchuk on 15 January 1993.)

The Moscow mayor Yury Luzhkov claimed the city, and in December 1996, the Russian Federation Council officially endorsed the claim, threatening negotiations. In response, Ukraine proposed a "special partnership" with NATO in January 1997.

In May 1997, Russia and Ukraine signed the Russian–Ukrainian Friendship Treaty, ruling out Moscow's territorial claims to Ukraine. This was followed by the Partition Treaty on the Status and Conditions of the Black Sea Fleet on 28 May 1997. A separate agreement established the terms of a long-term lease of land, facilities, and resources in Sevastopol and the Crimea by Russia. Russia kept its naval base, with around 15,000 troops stationed in Sevastopol.

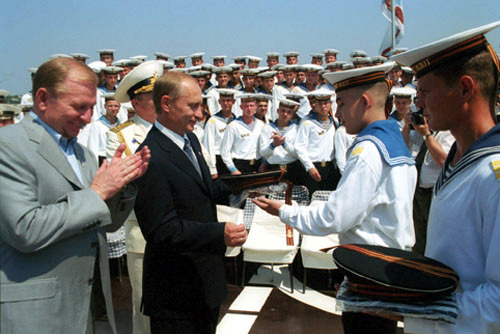
Russian president Vladimir Putin with Ukrainian president Leonid Kuchma on board the Black Sea Fleet's flagship in July 2001

The ex-Soviet Black Sea Fleet and its facilities were divided between Russia's Black Sea Fleet and the Ukrainian Naval Forces. The two navies co-used some of the city's harbours and piers, while others were demilitarised or used by either country. Sevastopol remained the location of the Russian Black Sea Fleet headquarters, and the Ukrainian Naval Forces Headquarters were also located in the city. A judicial row periodically continued over the naval hydrographic infrastructure both in Sevastopol and on the Crimean coast (especially lighthouses historically maintained by the Soviet and Russian Navy and also used for civil navigation support).

As in the rest of Crimea, Russian remained the predominant language of the city, although following the independence of Ukraine there were some attempts at Ukrainisation, with very little success. Russian society in general and even some outspoken government representatives never accepted the loss of Sevastopol and tended to regard it as temporarily separated from Russia.

In July 2009, the chairman of the Sevastopol City Council, Valeriy Saratov (Party of Regions), said that Ukraine should increase the amount of compensation it is paying to the city of Sevastopol for hosting the foreign Russian Black Sea Fleet, instead of requesting such compensation from the Russian government and the Russian Ministry of Defence in particular.

On 27 April 2010, Russia and Ukraine ratified the Russian Ukrainian Naval Base for Gas treaty, which extended the Russian Navy's lease of the Crimean facilities for 25 years after 2017 (through 2042) with the option to prolong the lease in five-year extensions. The ratification process in the Ukrainian parliament encountered stiff opposition and even resulted in a brawl in the parliament chamber. Eventually, the treaty was ratified by a 52% majority vote—236 of 450. The Russian Duma ratified the treaty by a 98% majority.

=== Occupation and annexation by Russia ===
On 23 February 2014, a pro-Russian rally took place in Nakhimov Square declaring allegiance to Russia and protesting against the new government in Kyiv following the overthrow of the president, Viktor Yanukovych. On 27 February, pro-Russian militia, including Russian troops, seized control of government buildings in Crimea, and by 28 February, controlled other strategic locations such as the military airport in Sevastopol.

On 16 March 2014, an internationally unrecognised referendum was held in Sevastopol with official results claiming an 89.51% turnout and 95.6% of voters choosing to join Russia. Ukraine and almost all other countries of the United Nations General Assembly consider the referendum illegal and illegitimate.

On 18 March, Russia annexed Crimea, incorporating the Republic of Crimea and federal city of Sevastopol as federal subjects of Russia. However, the annexation remains internationally unrecognised, with most countries recognising Sevastopol as a city with special status within Ukraine. While Russia has taken de facto control of Sevastopol and Crimea, the international community considers the area as part of Ukraine.

== Geography ==
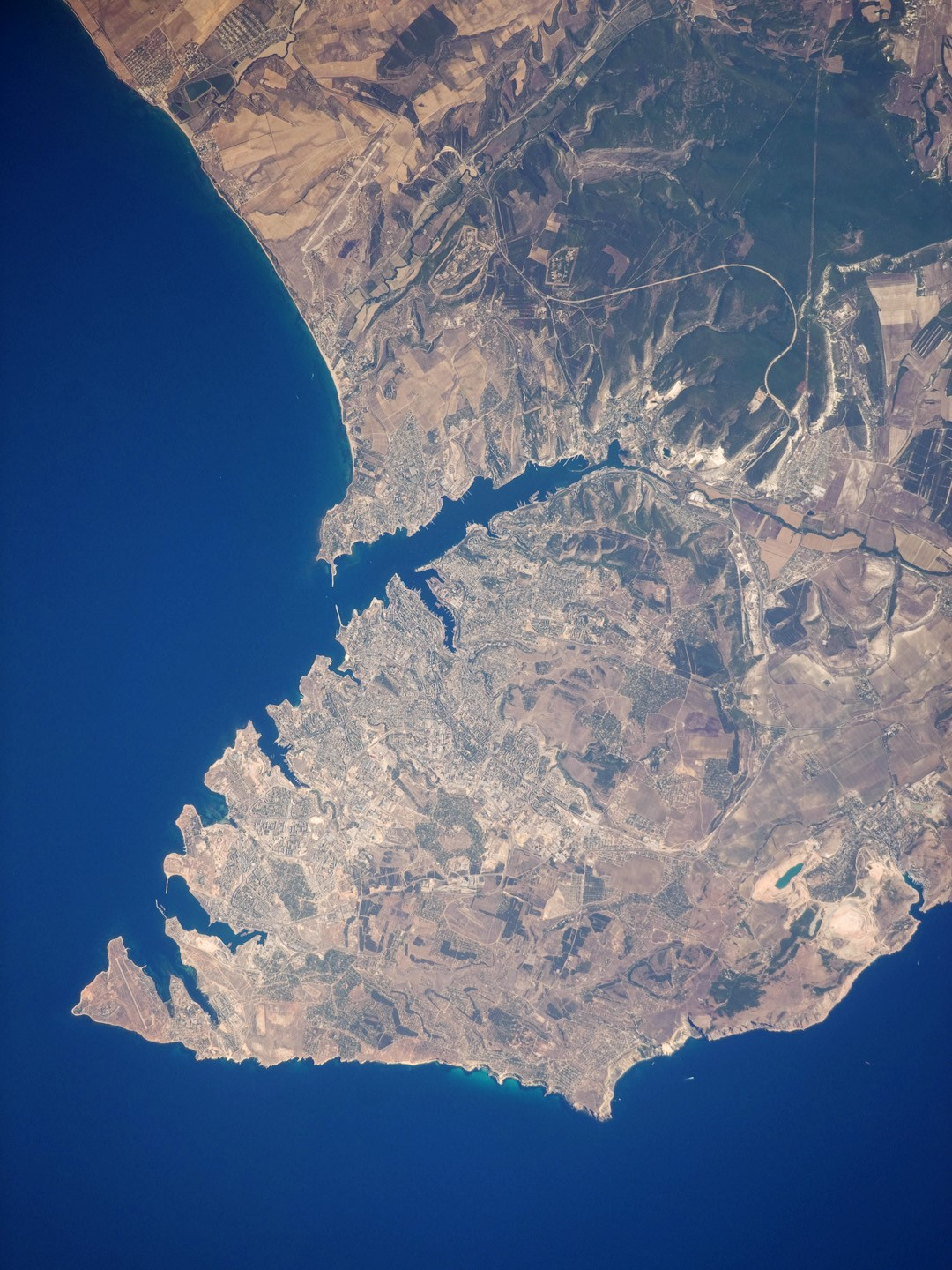
Satellite image of the Sevastopol area.

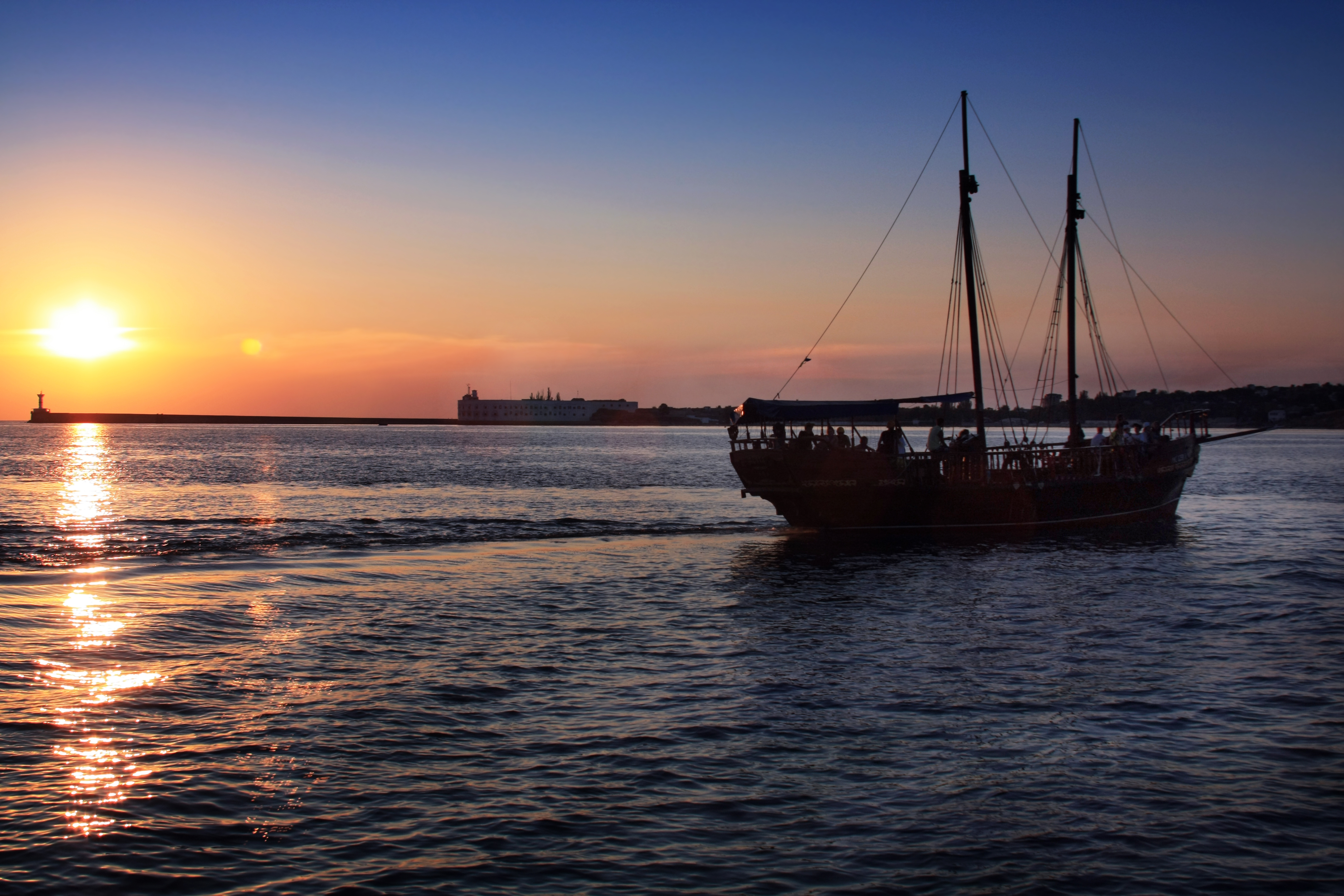
A view of the Bay of Sevastopol.

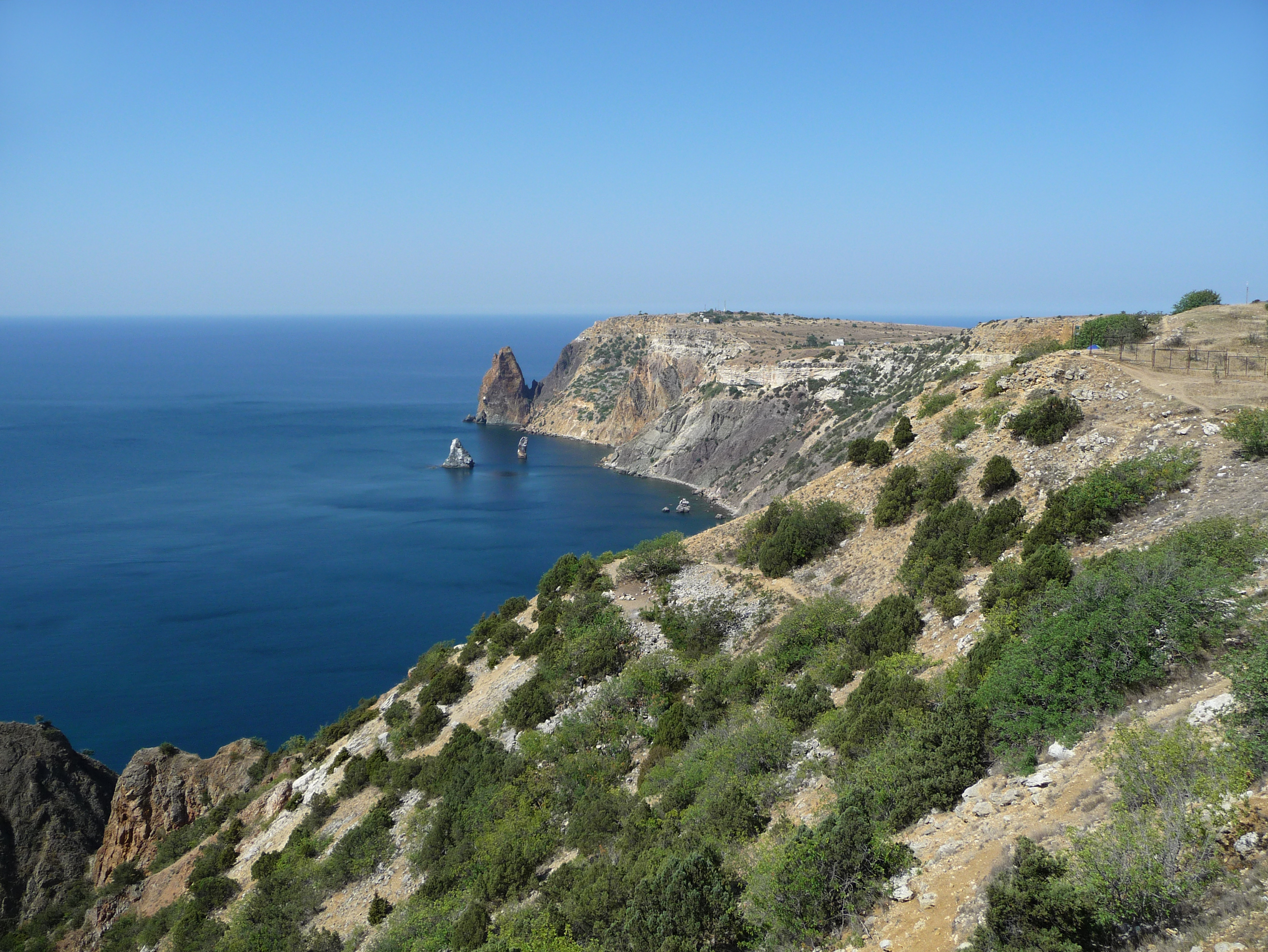
Cape Fiolent, on the southwestern coast of Sevastopol.

The city of Sevastopol is located at the southwestern tip of the Crimean Peninsula in a headland known as Heracles Peninsula on a coast of the Black Sea. The city is designated a special city-region of Ukraine which besides the city itself includes several of its outlying settlements. The city itself is concentrated mostly in the western portion of the region and around the long Bay of Sevastopol. This bay is a ria, a river canyon drowned by Holocene sea-level rise, and the outlet of Chorna River. Away in a remote location southeast of Sevastopol is located the former city of Balaklava (since 1957 incorporated within Sevastopol), the bay of which in the Soviet era served as a main port for the Soviet diesel-powered submarines.

The coastline of the region is mostly rocky, in a series of smaller bays, a great number of which are located within the Bay of Sevastopol. The biggest of them are Southern Bay (within the Bay of Sevastopol), Archer Bay, a gulf complex that consists of Deergrass Bay, the Bay of Cossack, Salty Bay, and many others. There are over thirty bays in the immediate region.

Three rivers flow through the region: the Belbek, Chorna, and Kacha. All three mountain chains of the Crimean Mountains are represented in Sevastopol, the southern chain by the Balaklava Highlands, the inner chain by the Mekenziev Mountains, and the outer chain by the Kara-Tau Upland (Black Mountain).

=== Climate ===
Sevastopol has a humid subtropical climate (Köppen: Cfa). Due to the summer mean straddling 22 °C (72 °F) it borders on a four-season oceanic climate, with cold winters and warm summers.

The average yearly temperature is 15–16 °C (59–61 °F) during the day and around 9 °C (48 °F) at night. In the coldest months, January and February, the average temperature is 5–6 °C (41–43 °F) during the day and around 1 °C (34 °F) at night. In the warmest months, July and August, the average temperature is around 26 °C (79 °F) during the day and around 19 °C (66 °F) at night. Generally, the summer/holiday season lasts 5 months, from around mid-May and into September, with the temperature often reaching 20 °C (68 °F) or more in the first half of October.

The average annual temperature of the sea is 14.2 °C (58 °F), ranging from 7 °C (45 °F) in February to 24 °C (75 °F) in August. From June to September, the average sea temperature is greater than 20 °C (68 °F). In the second half of May and the first half of October; the average sea temperature is about 17 °C (63 °F). The average rainfall is about 400 millimetres (16 in) per year. There are about 2,345 hours of sunshine duration per year.

Climate data for Sevastopol
Month	Jan	Feb	Mar	Apr	May	Jun	Jul	Aug	Sep	Oct	Nov	Dec	Year
Mean daily maximum °C (°F)	5.9 (42.6)	6.0 (42.8)	8.9 (48.0)	13.6 (56.5)	19.2 (66.6)	23.5 (74.3)	26.5 (79.7)	26.3 (79.3)	22.4 (72.3)	17.8 (64.0)	12.3 (54.1)	8.1 (46.6)	15.9 (60.6)
Daily mean °C (°F)	2.9 (37.2)	2.8 (37.0)	5.4 (41.7)	9.8 (49.6)	15.1 (59.2)	19.5 (67.1)	22.4 (72.3)	22.1 (71.8)	18.1 (64.6)	13.8 (56.8)	8.8 (47.8)	5.0 (41.0)	12.1 (53.8)
Mean daily minimum °C (°F)	−0.2 (31.6)	−0.4 (31.3)	2.0 (35.6)	6.1 (43.0)	11.1 (52.0)	15.5 (59.9)	18.2 (64.8)	17.9 (64.2)	13.9 (57.0)	9.9 (49.8)	5.4 (41.7)	2.0 (35.6)	8.5 (47.2)
Average precipitation mm (inches)	26 (1.0)	25 (1.0)	24 (0.9)	27 (1.1)	18 (0.7)	26 (1.0)	32 (1.3)	33 (1.3)	42 (1.7)	32 (1.3)	42 (1.7)	52 (2.0)	379 (15)
Average precipitation days	6	3	4	2	2	1	2	0	1	3	2	5	31
Mean monthly sunshine hours	72	75	145	202	267	316	356	326	254	177	98	64	2,352
Source: pogodaiklimat.ru

== Government and politics ==
Since 18 March 2014, when Russia annexed Crimea, including Sevastopol, the de facto government and politics of Sevastopol has been that of a federal city of Russia.

=== Government ===
Executive

The head of the executive branch in the city is the Governor of Sevastopol. According to the city charter, amended on 29 November 2016, the governor is elected in a direct election for a term of five years and no more than two consecutive terms. The current governor is Mikhail Razvozhayev.

Legislature

During the annexation of Ukrainian Crimea by Russia, the pro-Russian Sevastopol City Council threw its support behind Russian citizen Alexei Chaly as a "people's mayor" and said it would not recognise orders from Kyiv. After Russia annexed Crimea, the Legislative Assembly of Sevastopol replaced the City Council.

Administrative and municipal divisions

Within the Russian municipal framework, the territory of the federal city of Sevastopol is divided into nine municipal okrugs and the town of Inkerman. While individual municipal divisions are contained within the borders of the administrative districts, they are not otherwise related to the administrative districts.

=== Politics ===
Sevastopol elects one Deputy to the Russian State Duma. The current Deputy, Tatyana Lobach of United Russia, a former Deputy Chairwoman of the Legislative Assembly of Sevastopol, was first elected at the 2021 Russian legislative elections and re-elected at the in 2026.

=== Ukrainian de jure administration ===
Districts of Sevastopol: Gagarin Raion (Gagarinsky) Lenin Raion (Leninsky) Nakhimov Raion (Nakhimovsky) Balaklava Raion (Balaklavsky)

According to the Constitution of Ukraine, Sevastopol is administered as a City with special status. Executive power in Sevastopol is exercised by the Sevastopol City State Administration, led by a chairman (also known as mayor) appointed by the Ukrainian president. The Sevastopol City Council is the legislature of Sevastopol.

Sevastopol is administratively divided into four districts:

- Gagarin Raion
- Lenin Raion
- Nakhimov Raion
- Balaklava Raion

== Economy ==
Apart from navy-related civil facilities, Sevastopol hosts some other notable industries. An example is Stroitel, a major plastic manufacturer.

=== Industry ===
- Sevastopol Aircraft Plant, SMZ Sevastopol Shipyards (main at Naval Bay) & Inkerman Shipyards, Balaklava Bay Shipyard
- Impuls 2 SMZ
- Chornomornaftogaz § Chernomorneftegaz (Chjornomor), oil/gas extraction, petrochemical, jack rigs and oil platforms, LNG and oil tankers.
- AO FNGUP Granit subsidiary of Almaz Antej, assembly, overhaul, and maintenance of SAM and radar EW complexes, ADS services.
- Sevastopol (Parus SPriborMZ, Mayak, NPO Elektron, NPP Kvant, Tavrida Elektronik, Musson, and other industrial plants)
- Sevastopol Economic Industrial Zone SevPZ (SE area)
- Persej SMZ ship repair and floating dock yard plant (South Bay, Sevastopol)
- Sevastopol ship repair and floating docks yards (various)
- Metallurgy, Chemical Plants, and other industries.
- Agriculture: rice, wheat, grapes, tea, fruits, and tobacco (lesser).
- Mining: iron, titanium, manganese, aluminum, calcite silicates, and amethyst.
- Kerch bridge, Taurida highway, Sevastopol GasTES plus solar FV plants, gas and petrol depots, and coal derivatives.

=== Infrastructure ===
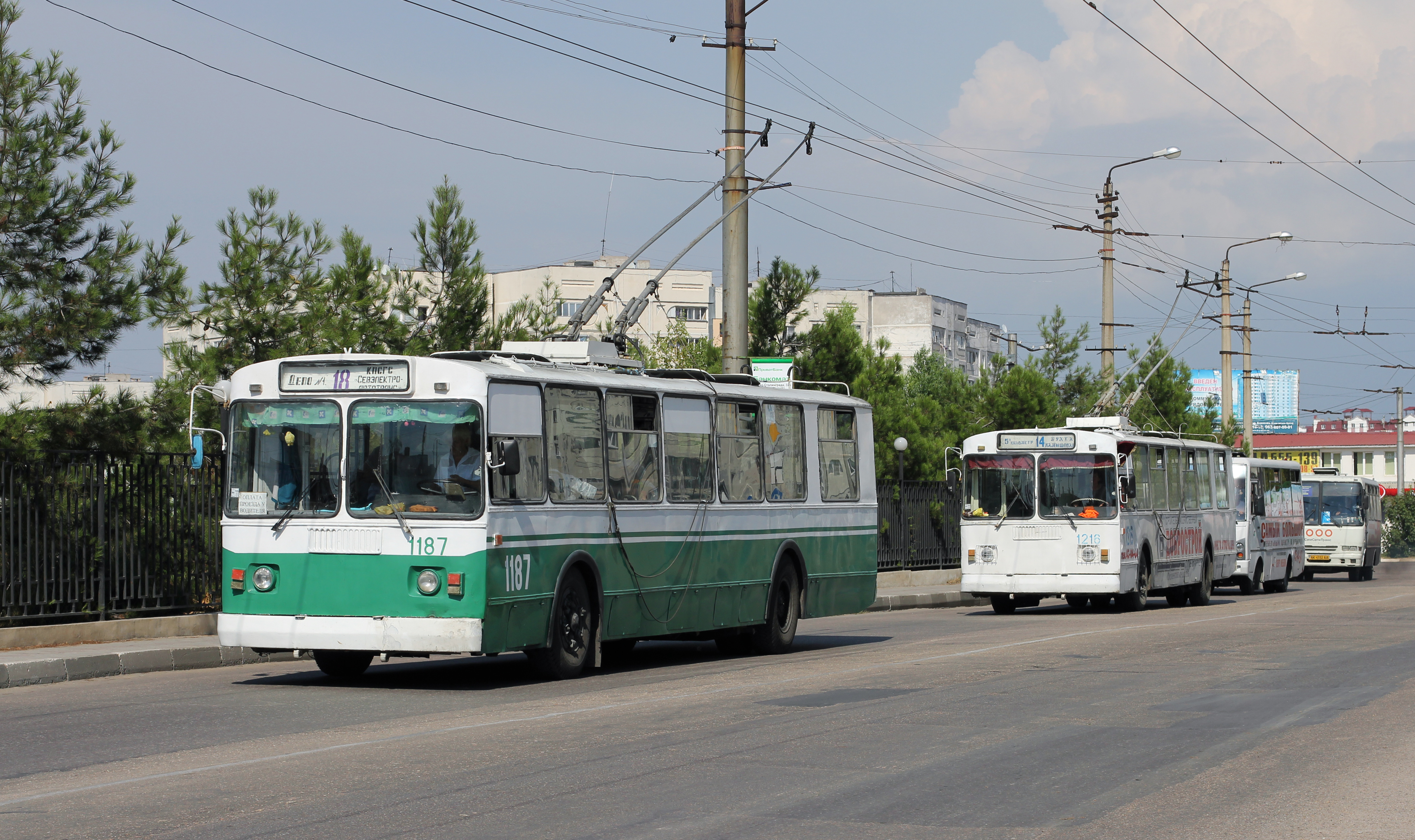
Trolleybuses ZiU-9 in Sevastopol

There are different types of transport in Sevastopol:

- Bus – 101 lines
- Trolley bus – 14 lines
- Minibus – 52 lines
- Cutter – 6 lines
- Ferry – 1 line
- Express bus – 15 lines
- HEV train (local, suburban route) – 1 route
- Airport – 1

Sevastopol Shipyard comprises three facilities that together repair, modernise, and re-equip Russian Naval ships and submarines. The Sevastopol International Airport is used as a military aerodrome at the moment and being reconstructed to be used by international airlines.

Sevastopol maintains a large port facility in the Bay of Sevastopol and in smaller bays around the Heracles peninsula. The port handles traffic from passengers (local transportation and cruise), cargo, and commercial fishing. The port infrastructure is fully integrated with the city of Sevastopol and the naval bases of the Black Sea Fleet.

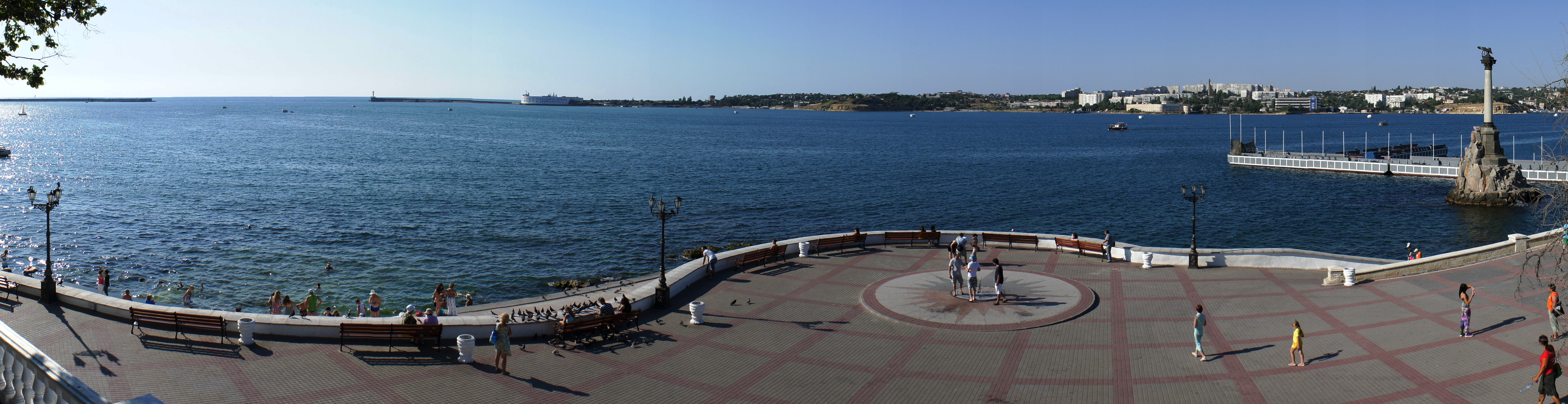
Panorama of the Sevastopol port entrance (left) with its monument to Russian ships which were sunk in the Crimean War to blockade the harbour (far right side).

=== Tourism ===
Due to its military history, most streets in the city are named after Russian and Soviet military heroes. There are hundreds of monuments and plaques in various parts of Sevastopol commemorating its military past.

Attractions include:

- Chersonesos National Archaeological Reserve
- MP Kroshitsky Sevastopol Art Museum
- Sevastopol Museum of Local History
- Aquarium-Museum of the Institute of Biology of the Southern Seas of the National Academy of Sciences of Ukraine
- Dolphinarium of Sevastopol
- Monument to the Sunken Ships
- The Panorama Museum (The Heroic Defence of Sevastopol during the Crimean War)
- Malakhov Kurgan (Barrow) with its White Tower
- Admirals' Burial Vault
- The Black Sea Fleet Museum
- The Storming of Sapun-gora of 7 May 1944, the Diorama Museum (World War II)
- Naval museum complex "Balaklava", decommissioned underground submarine base, now opened to the public
- Cheremetieff brothers museum "Crimean war 1853–1856"
- Museum of the underground forces of 1942–1944
- Museum Historical Memorial Complex "35th Coastal Battery"
- The Naval Museum "Michael's battery"
- Fraternal (Communal) War Cemetery

=== Gallery ===
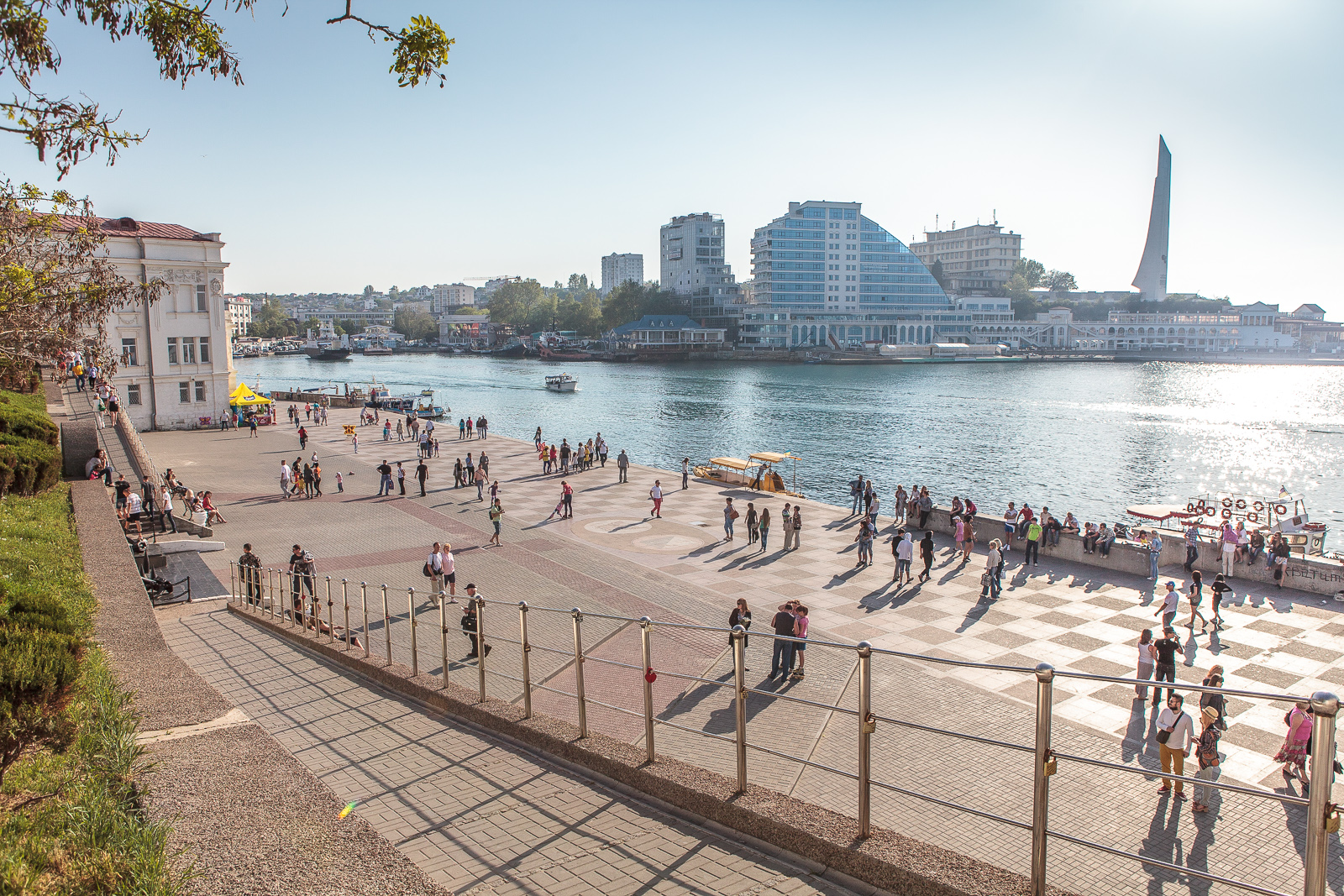
Sevastopol Artillery Bay view

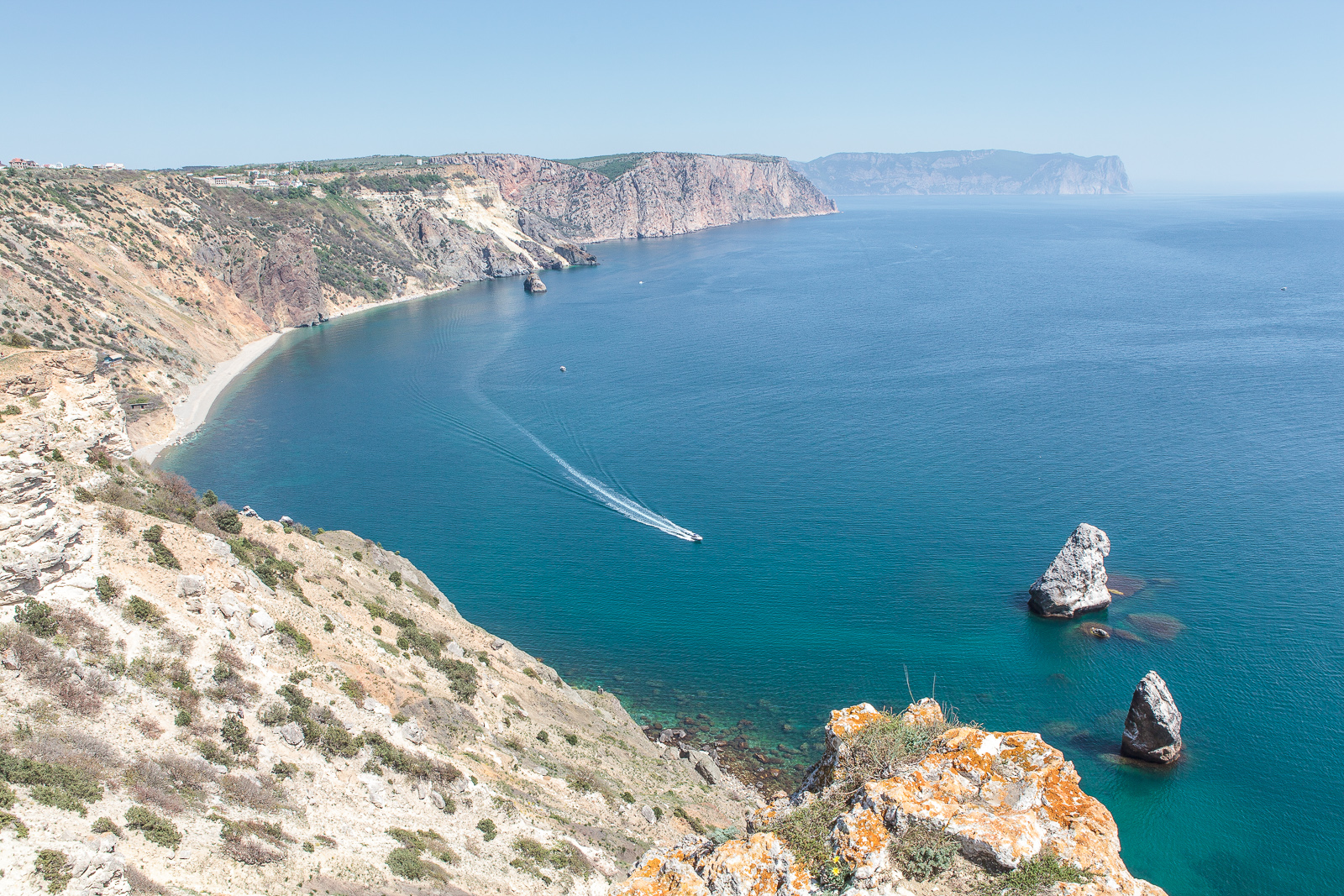
The seaside of Sevastopol

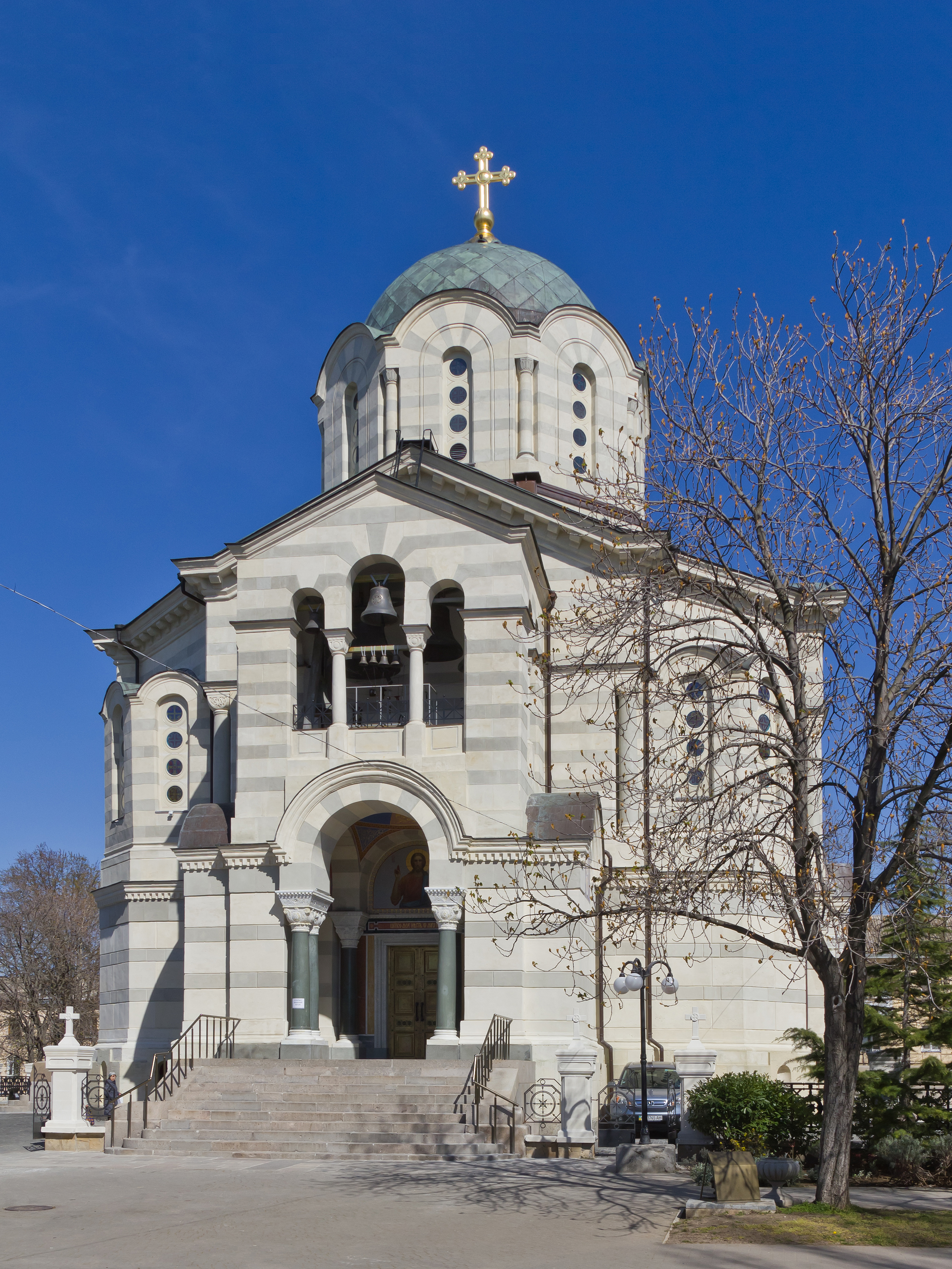
St. Vladimir's Cathedral at 'the city hill'

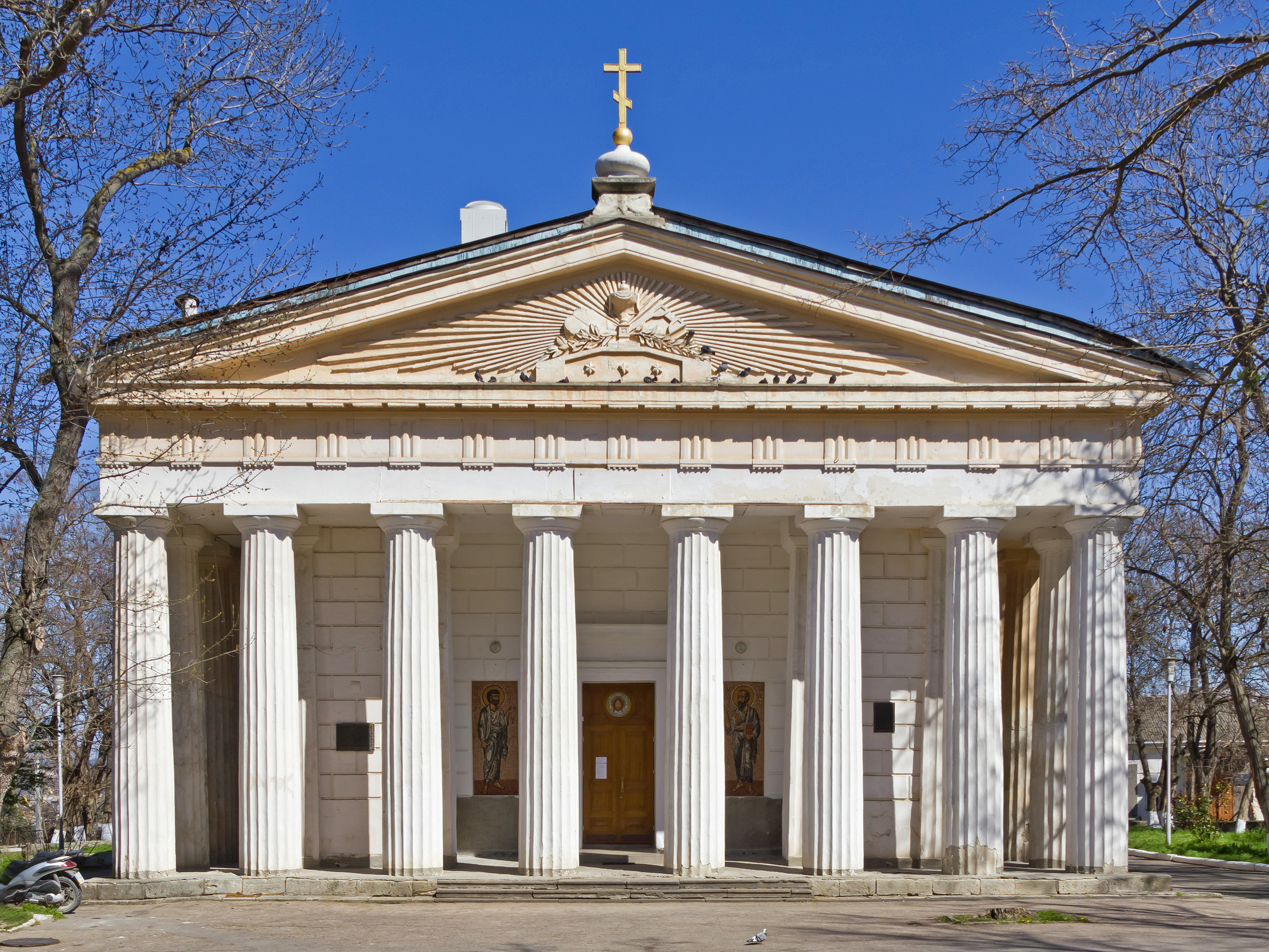
Saints Peter and Paul Cathedral

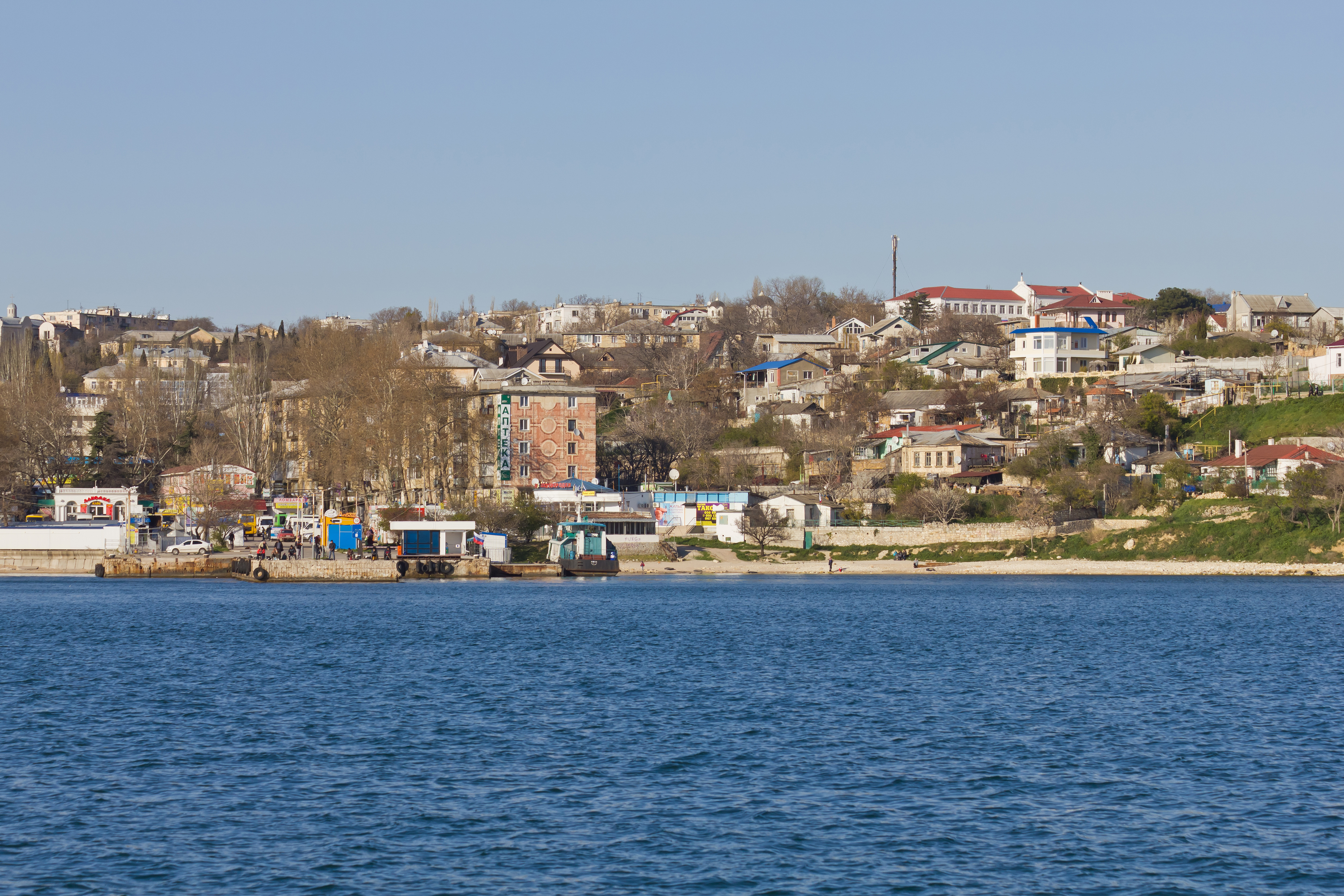
View of the Northern side

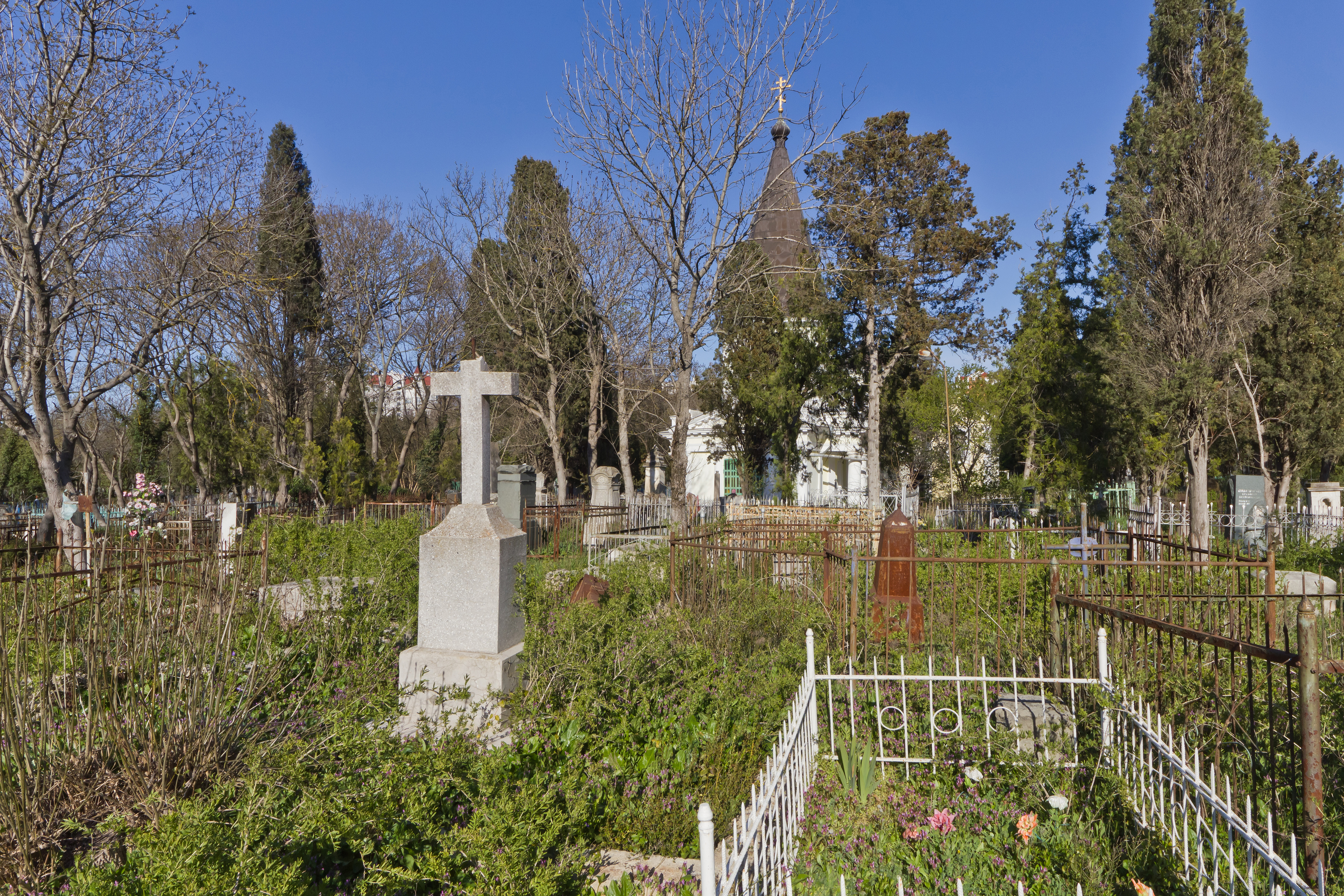
Old city cemetery

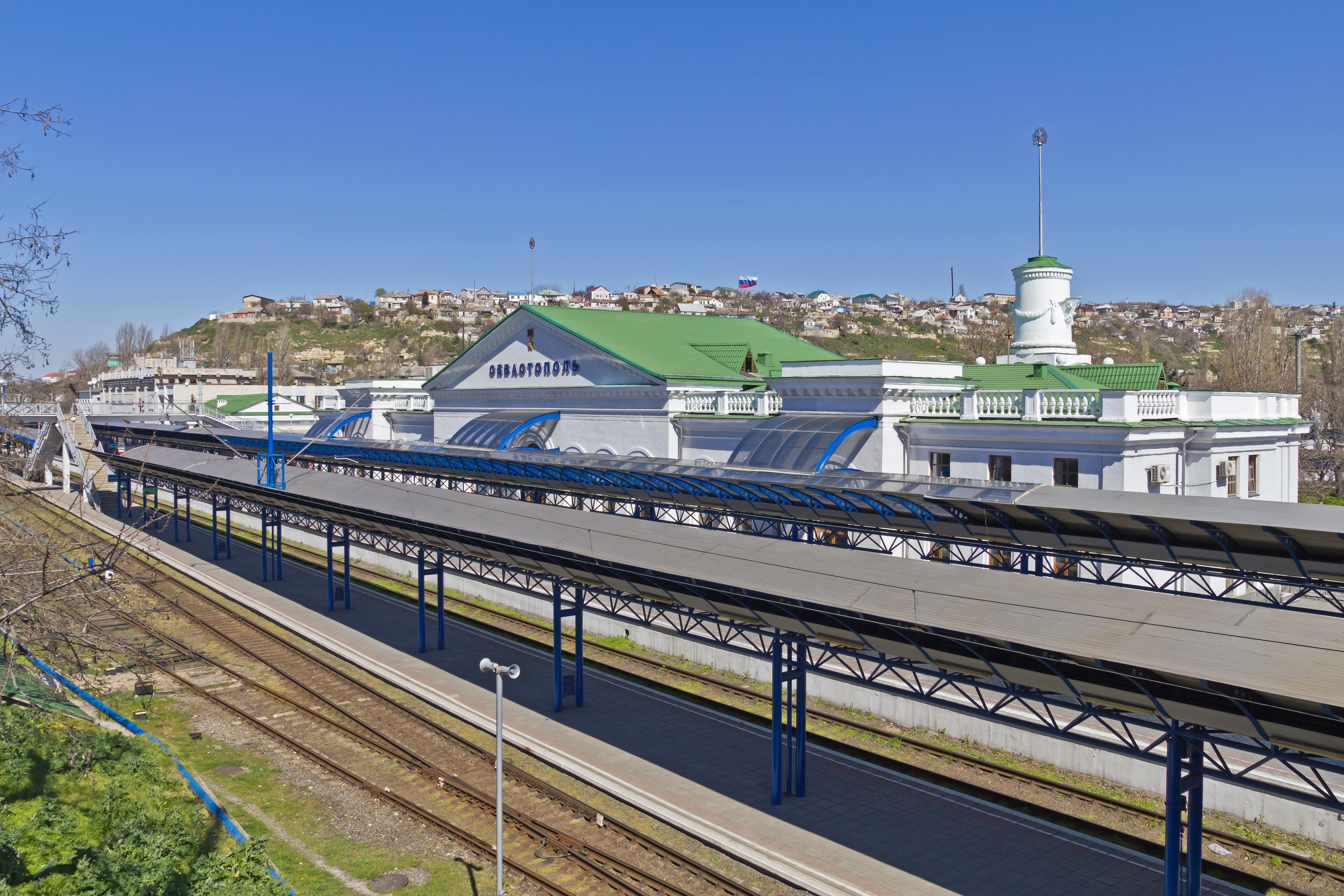
Main railway station

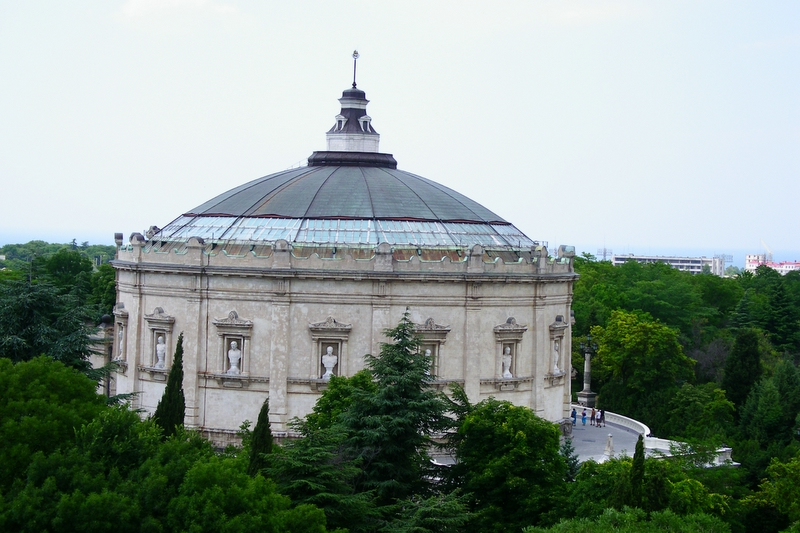
The Panorama Museum (The Heroic Defence of Sevastopol during the Crimean War)

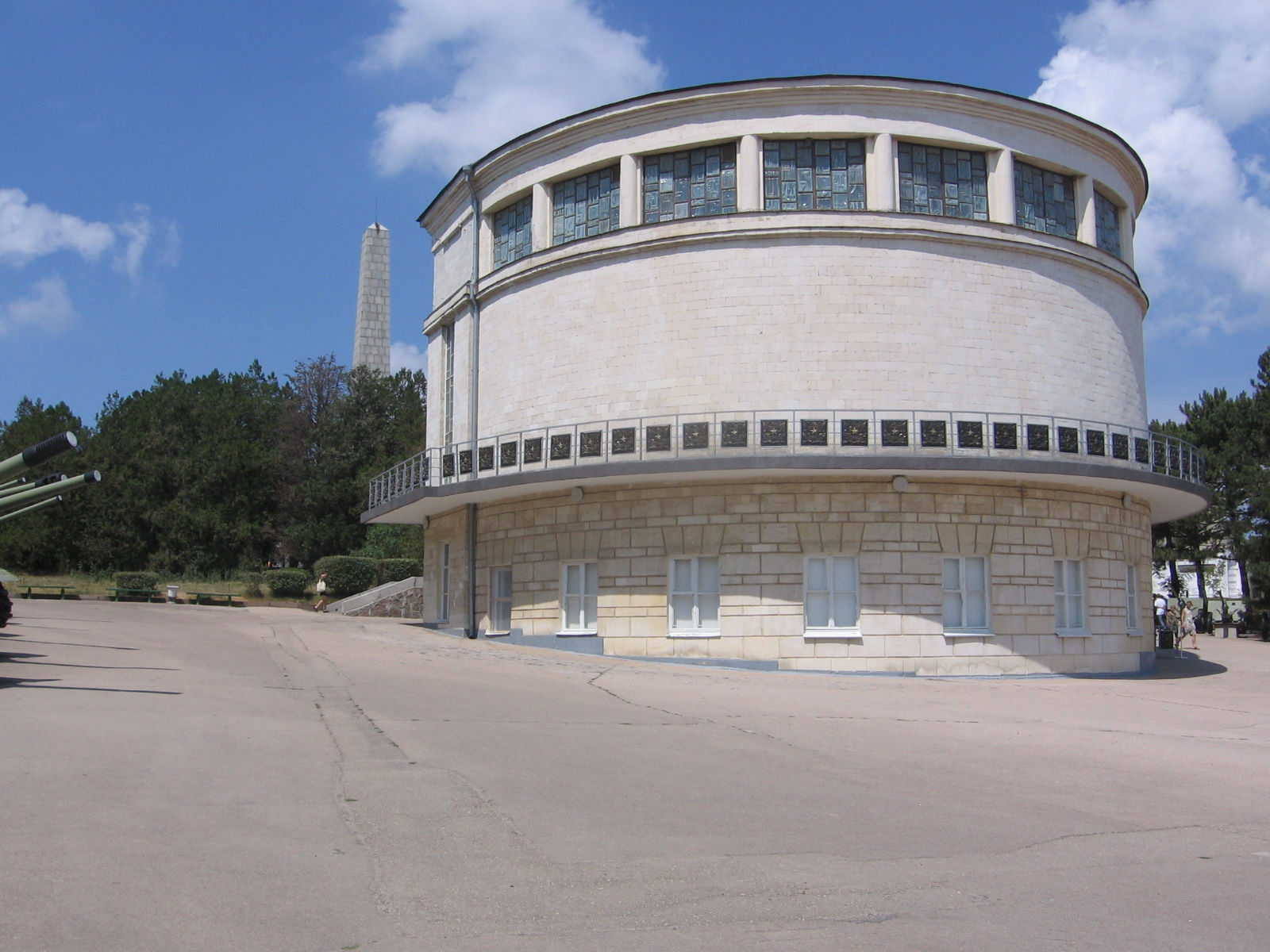
The Storming of Sapun-gora of 7 May 1944, the Diorama Museum (World War II)

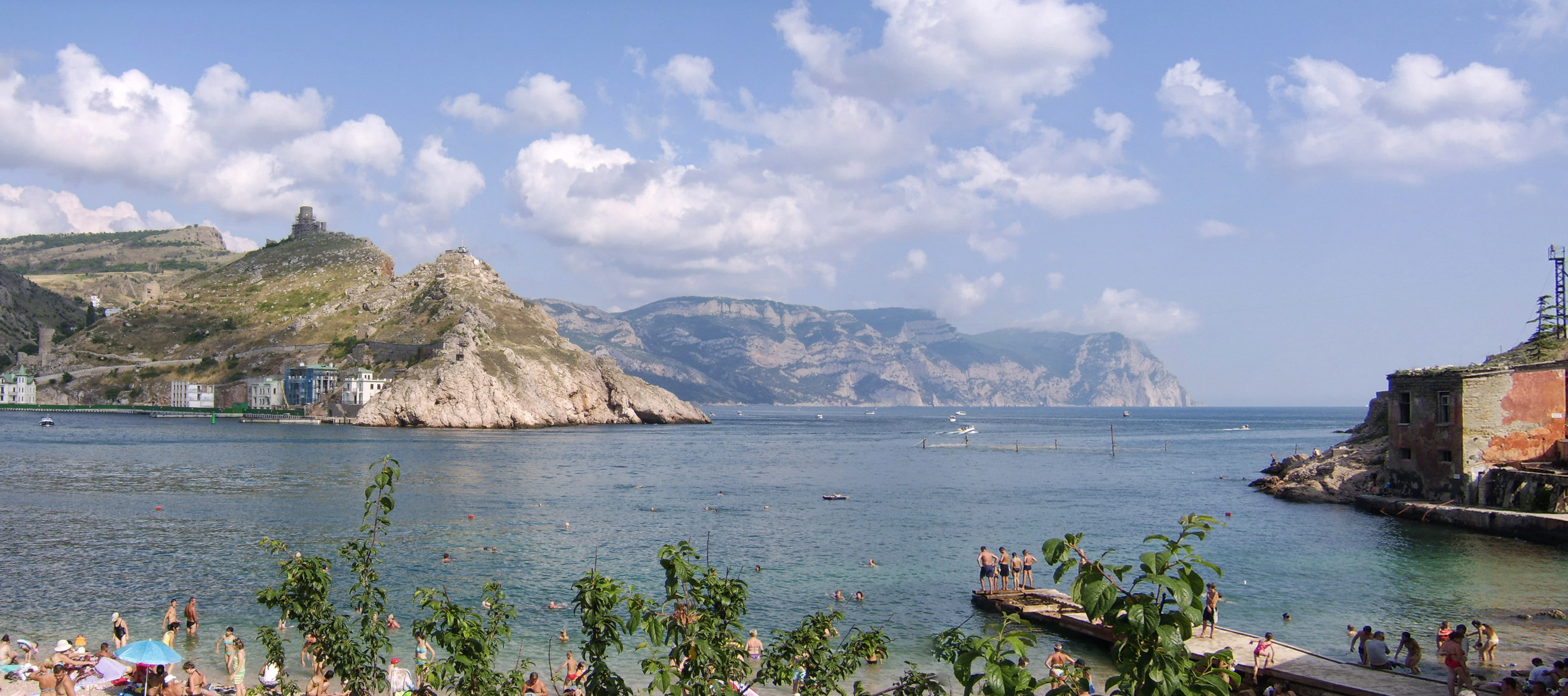
Entrance to Balaklava bay, 2010

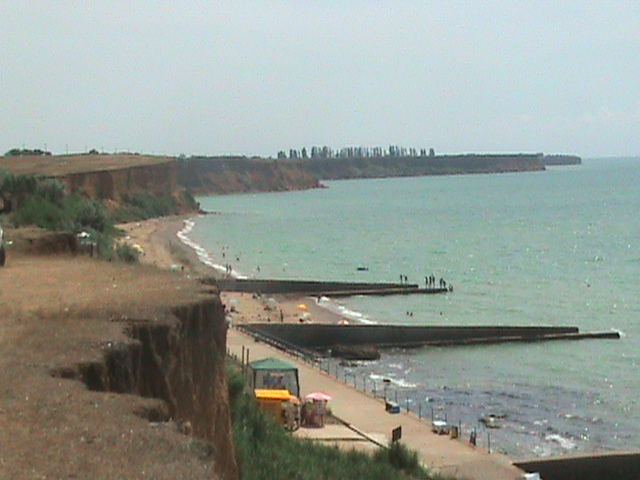
Steep West Bank, Andriivka

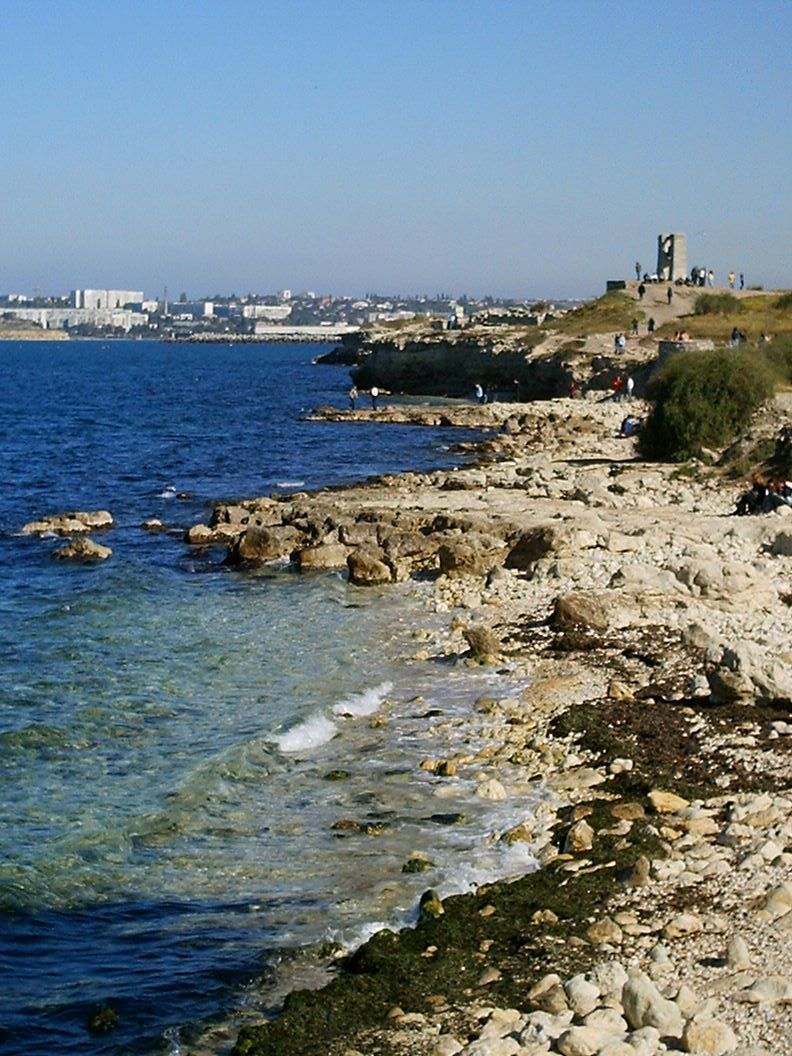
The rocky shore of Heracles of the Ey Peninsula, Chersonesos

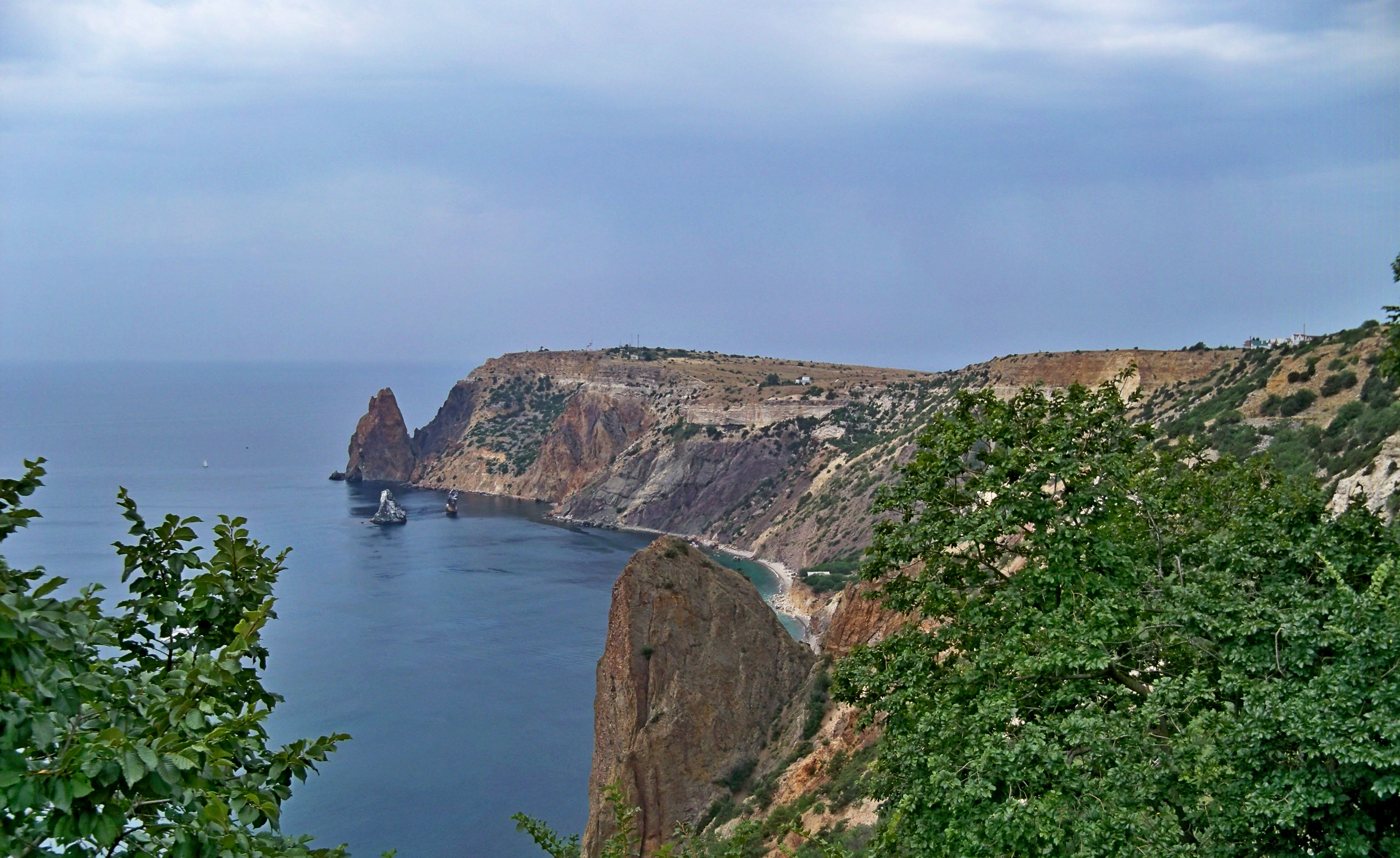
The high shore of Cape Fiolent

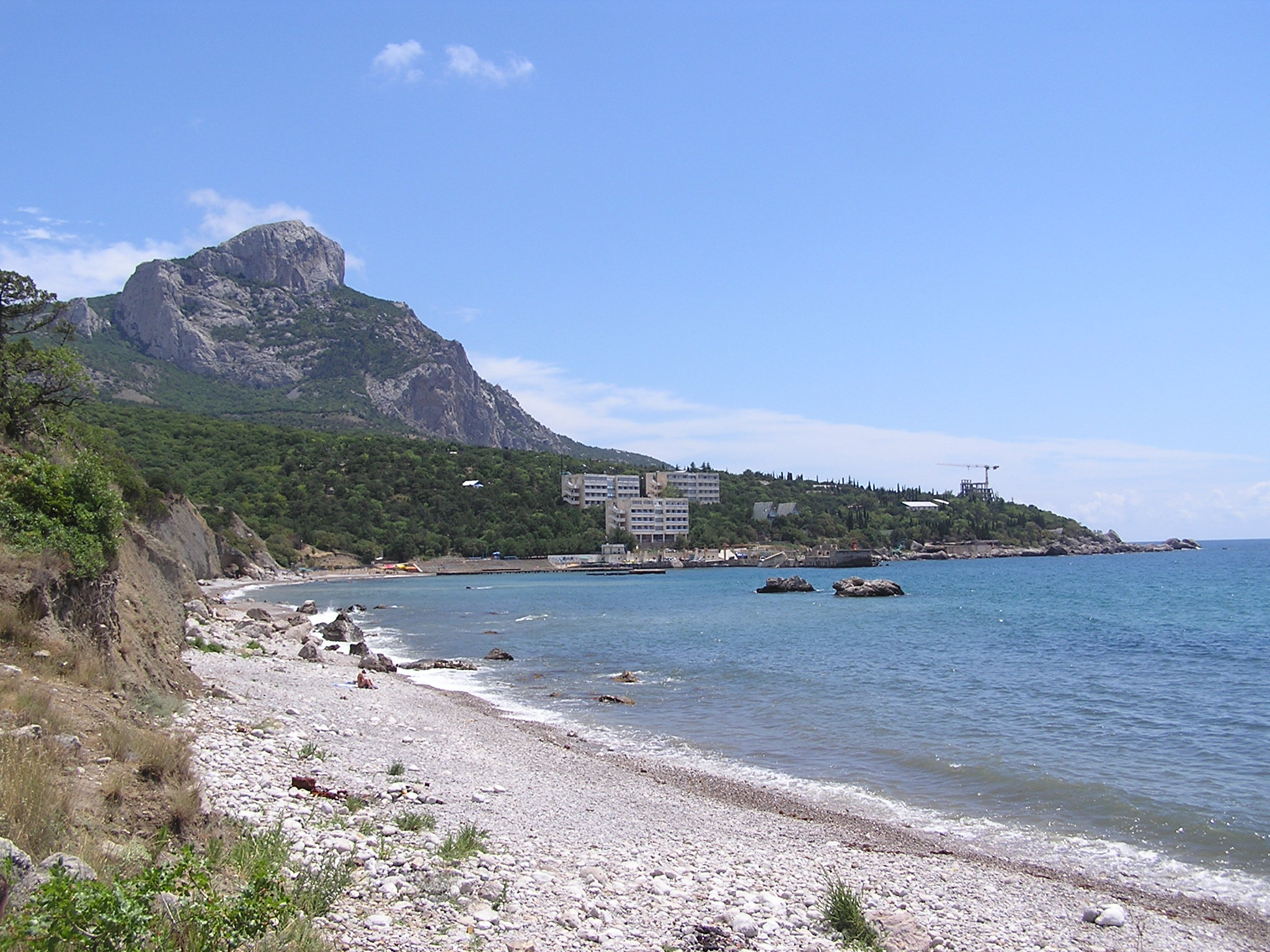
South bank landscape, Laspi

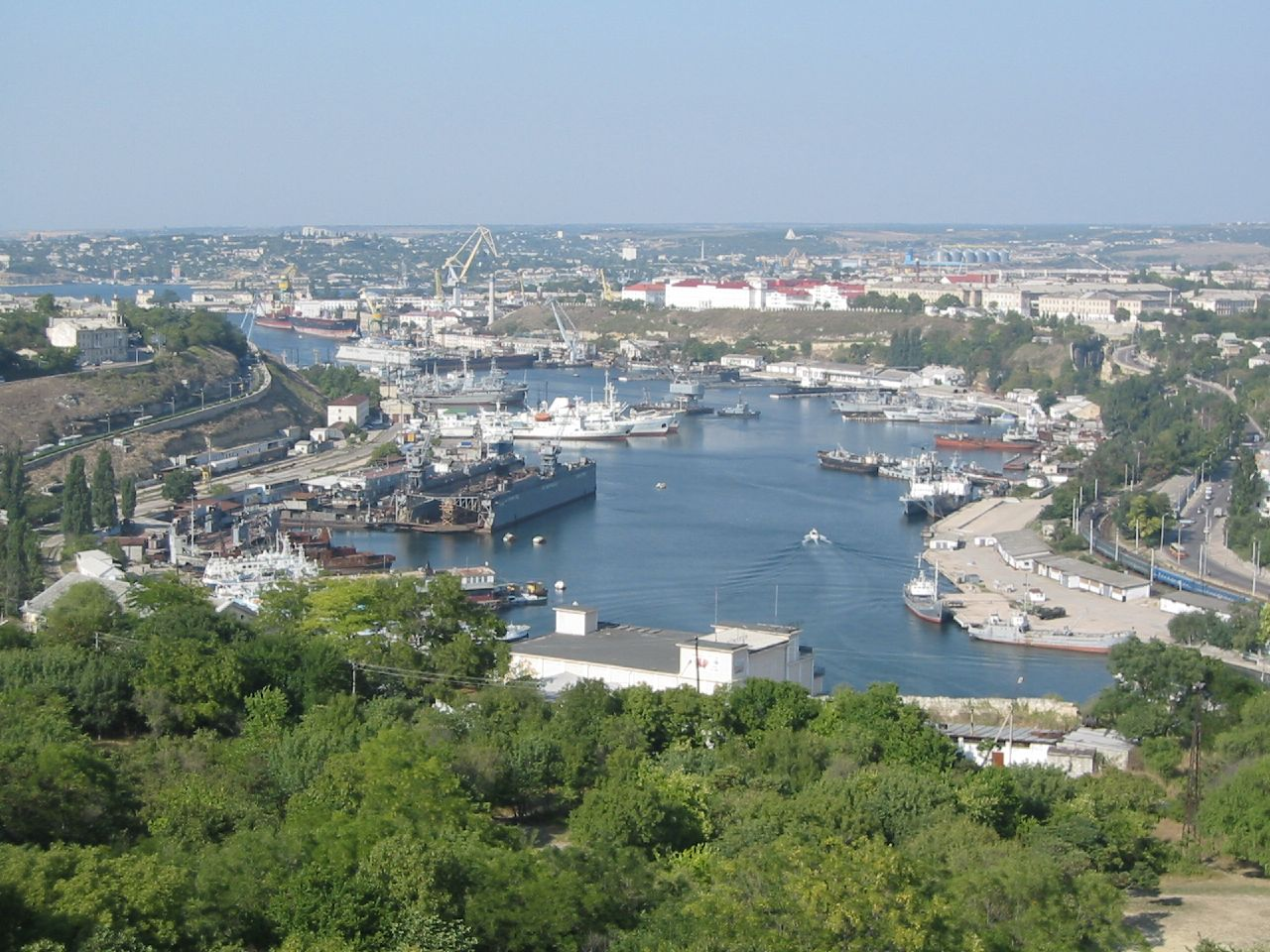
South bay

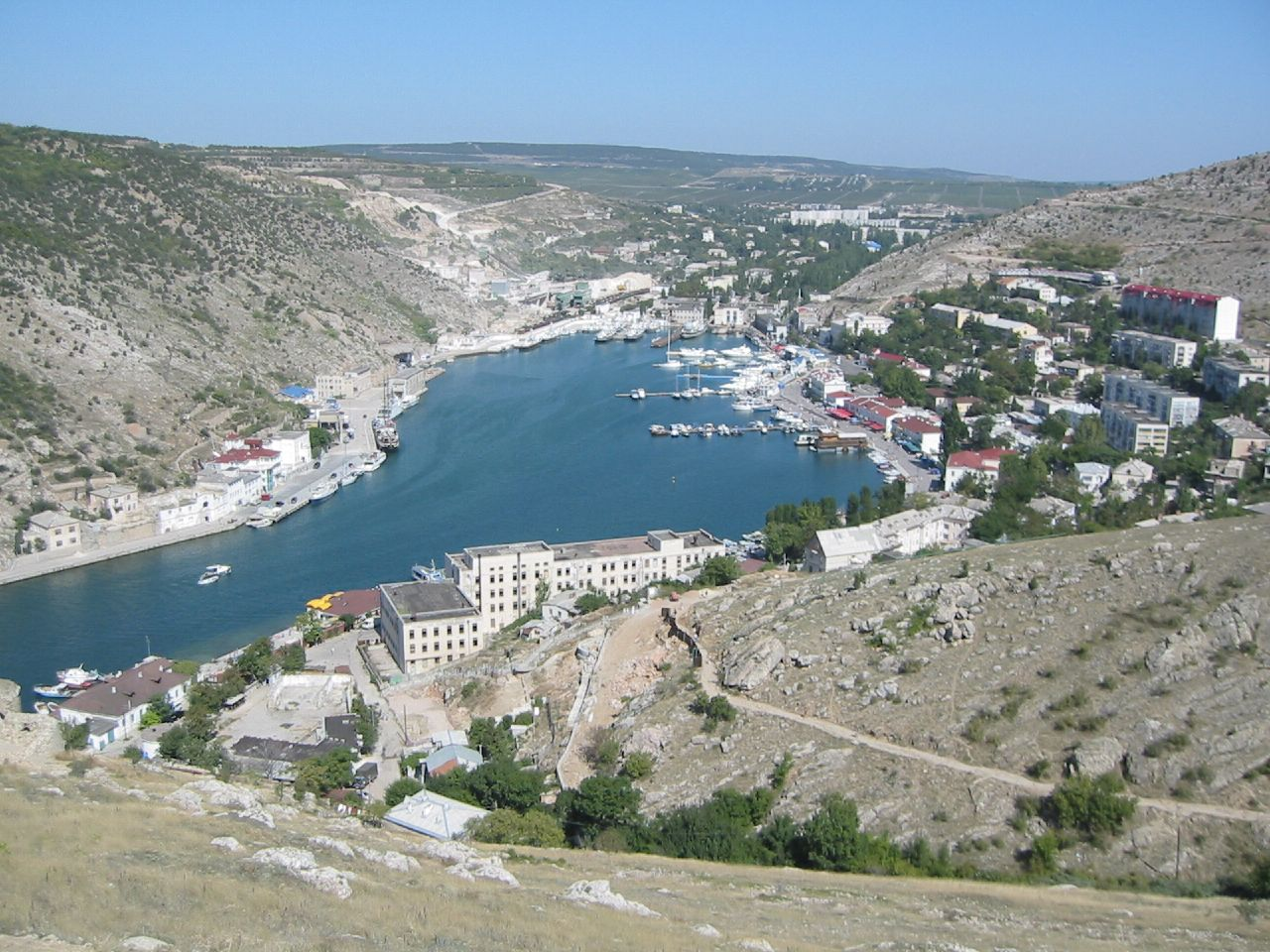
Balaklava bay

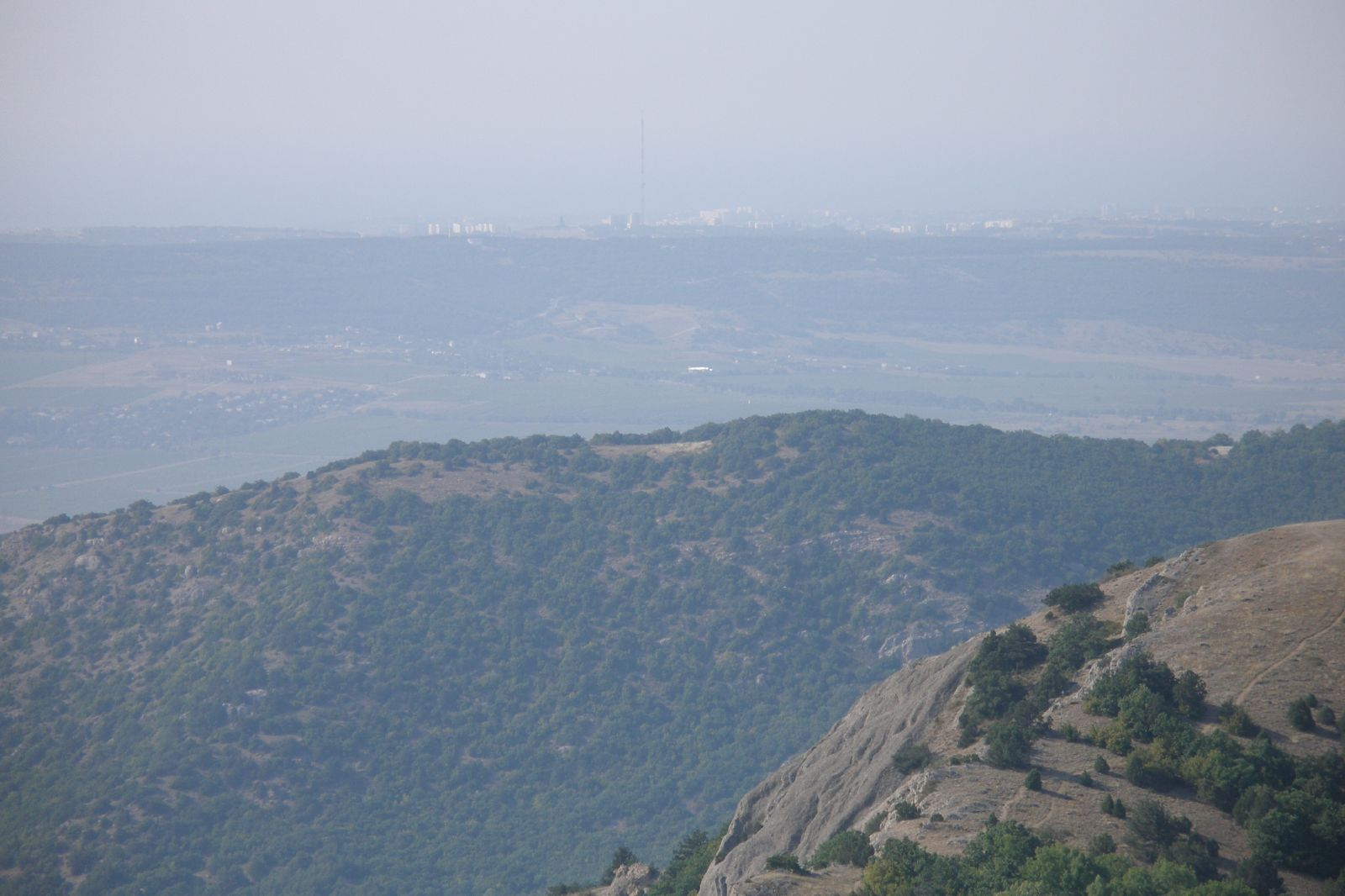
View of Sevastopol from Balaklava Heights

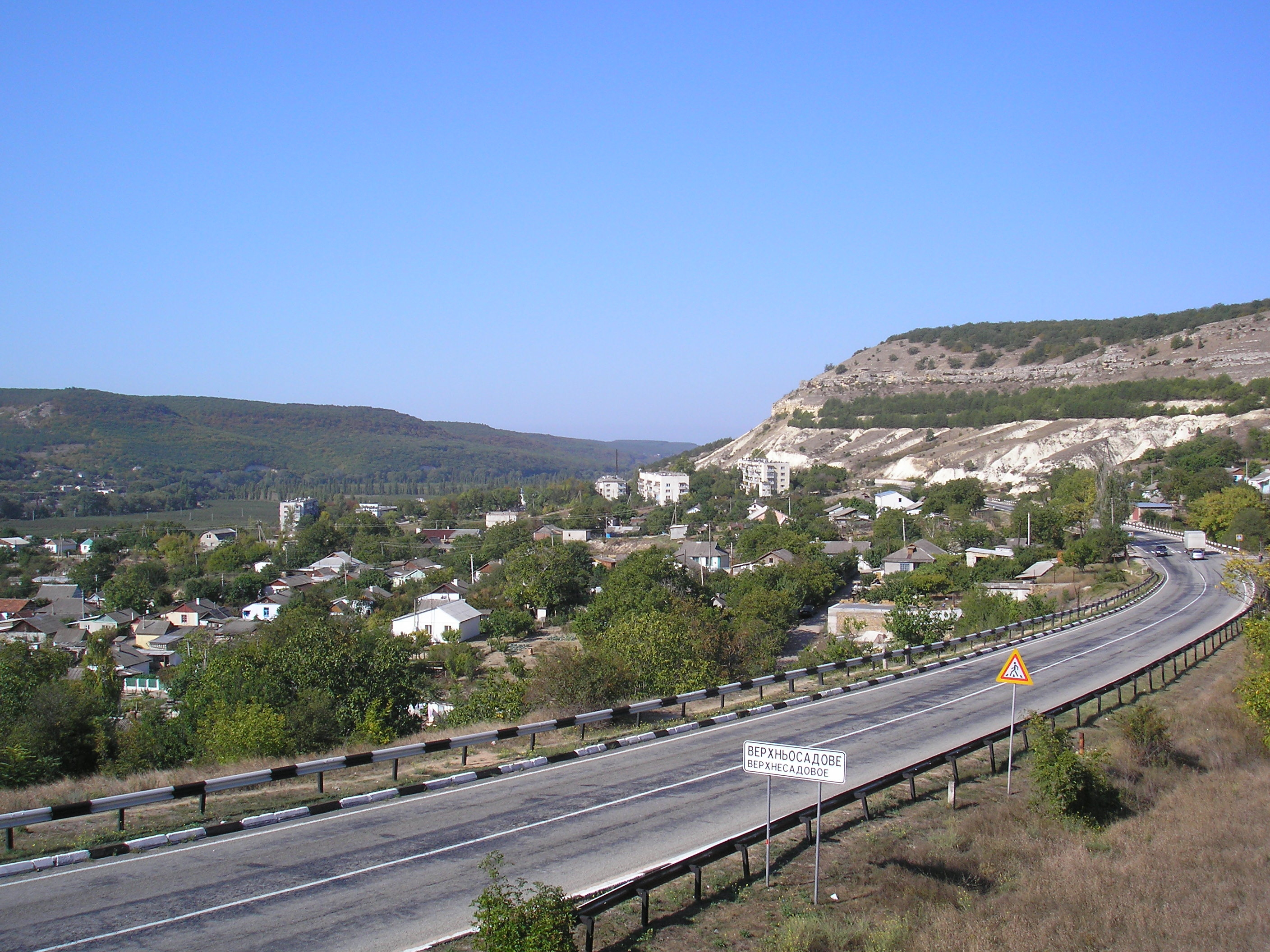
Road, Verkhniosadove village

== Demographics ==
Population pyramid of Sevastopol as of the 2021 Russian Census

Historical population
Year	Pop.	±%
1897	53,595	—
1926	68,003	+26.9%
1939	109,104	+60.4%
1959	148,033	+35.7%
1970	228,904	+54.6%
1979	300,686	+31.4%
1989	356,123	+18.4%
2001	342,451	−3.8%
2014	393,304	+14.8%
2021	547,820	+39.3%
Source: Census data

The population of Sevastopol is 509,992, consisting of 479,394 urban residents and 30,598 rural (January 2021), making it the most populous city of the Crimean Peninsula.

The city has retained an ethnic Russian majority throughout its history. In 1989 the proportion of Russians living in the city was 74.4%, and by the time of the Ukrainian National Census, 2001, the ethnic groups of Sevastopol included Russians (71.6%), Ukrainians (22.4%), Belarusians (1.6%), Tatars (0.7%), Crimean Tatars (0.5%), Armenians (0.3%), Jews (0.3%), Moldovans (0.2%), and Azerbaijanis (0.2%).

Age structure
0–14 years old	male 27,856 / female 26,532	(14.3% ▲)
15–64 years old	male 126,918 / female 141,304	(70.3% ▼)
65 years and over	male 19,038 / female 39,826	(15.4% ▲)

Median age
- Male: 36.0 years ▲
- Female: 44.6 years
- Total: 40.2 years ▲

Vital statistics for 2015:

- Births: 5 471 (13.7 per 1000)
- Deaths: 6 072 (15.2 per 1000)

=== Life expectancy ===
In 2015, Sevastopol had the largest decrease in life expectancy at birth among all regions of Russia.
In 2020, after beginning of the COVID-19 pandemic, Sevastopol became the only region of Russia where there was increase of life expectancy.
In 2021, average life expectancy at birth in Sevastopol was 72.25 years (67.87 for males and 76.43 for females).

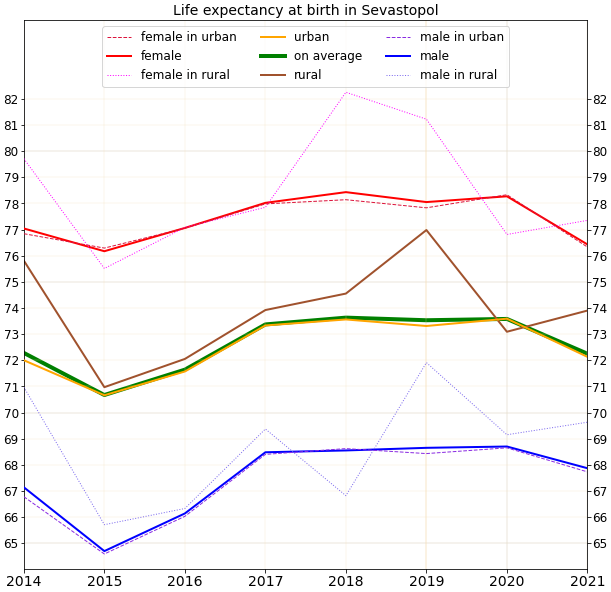
Life expectancy in Sevastopol

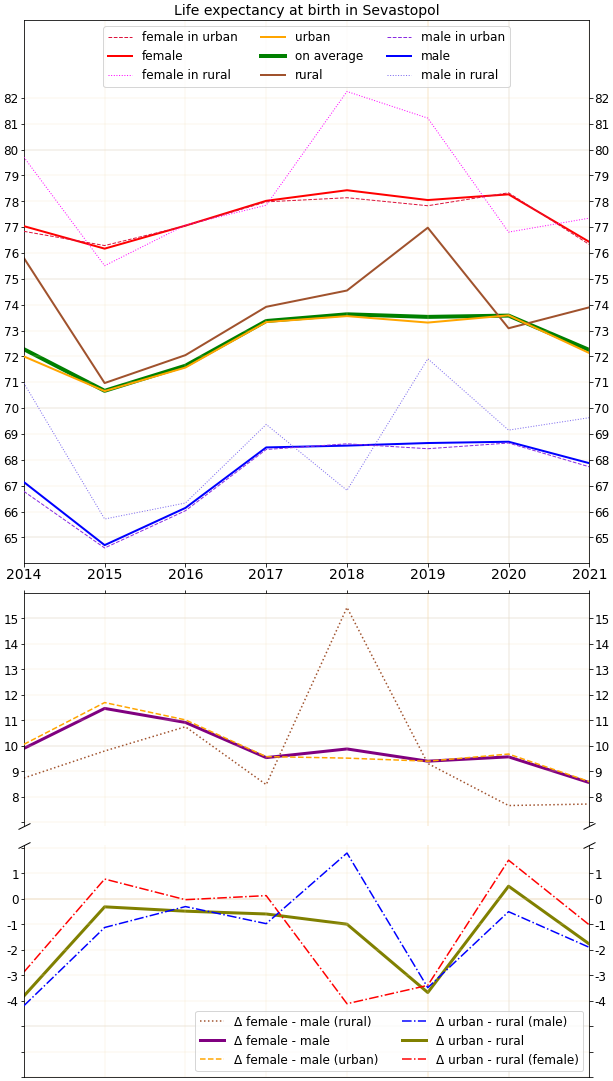
Life expectancy with calculated differences

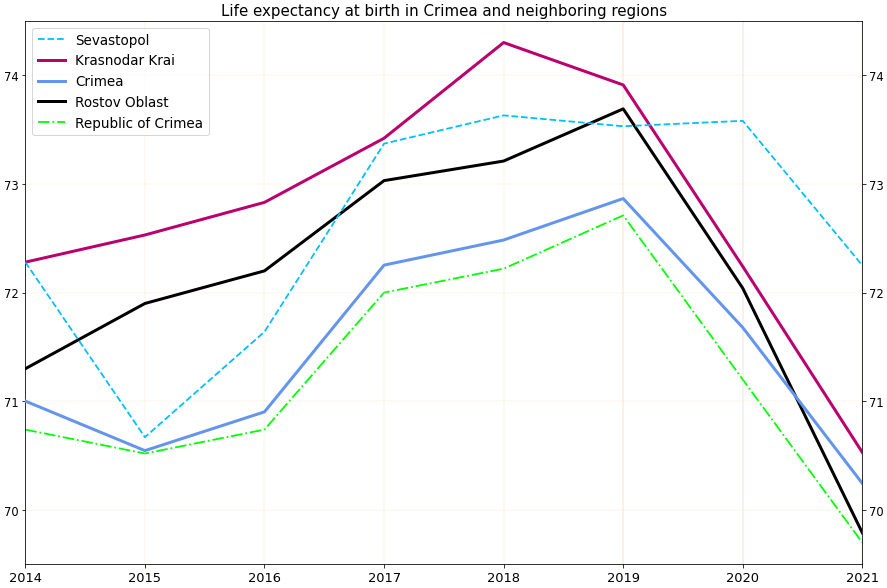
Life expectancy in Sevastopol in comparison with Crimea on average and neighbouring regions of the country

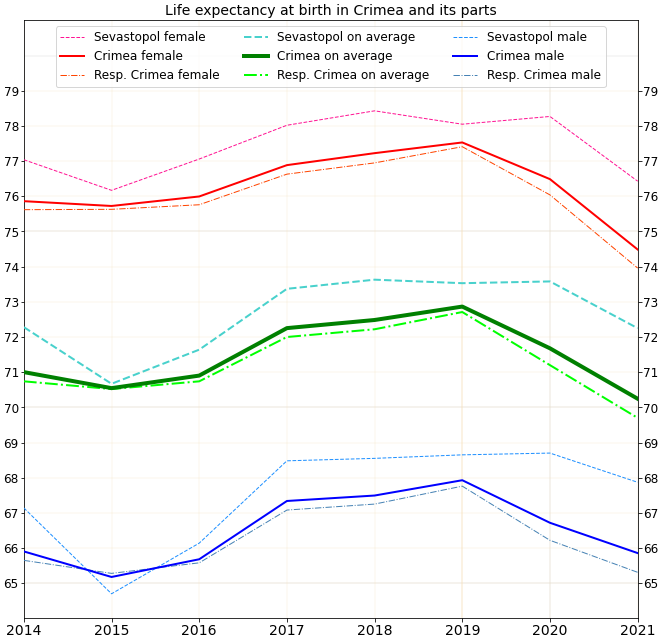
Life expectancy in Sevastopol in comparison with Crimea on average (in detail)

== Culture ==
There are many historical buildings in the central and eastern parts of the city and Balaklava, some of which are architectural monuments. The Western districts have modern architecture. More recently, numerous skyscrapers have been built. Balaklava Bayfront Plaza (on hold), currently under construction, will be one of the tallest buildings in Ukraine, at 173 m (568 ft) with 43 floors.

After the 2014 Russian annexation of Crimea the city's monument to Petro Konashevych-Sahaidachny was removed and handed over to Kharkiv.

=== Sport ===
FC Sevastopol is a professional football club that plays in the Russian Second League Division B, the fourth tier of the Russian football system.

== Education ==
- Economics and Humanities Institute (Branch), Crimean Federal University
- Sevastopol National Technical University
- Sevastopol National University of Nuclear Energy and Industry

== Notable people ==
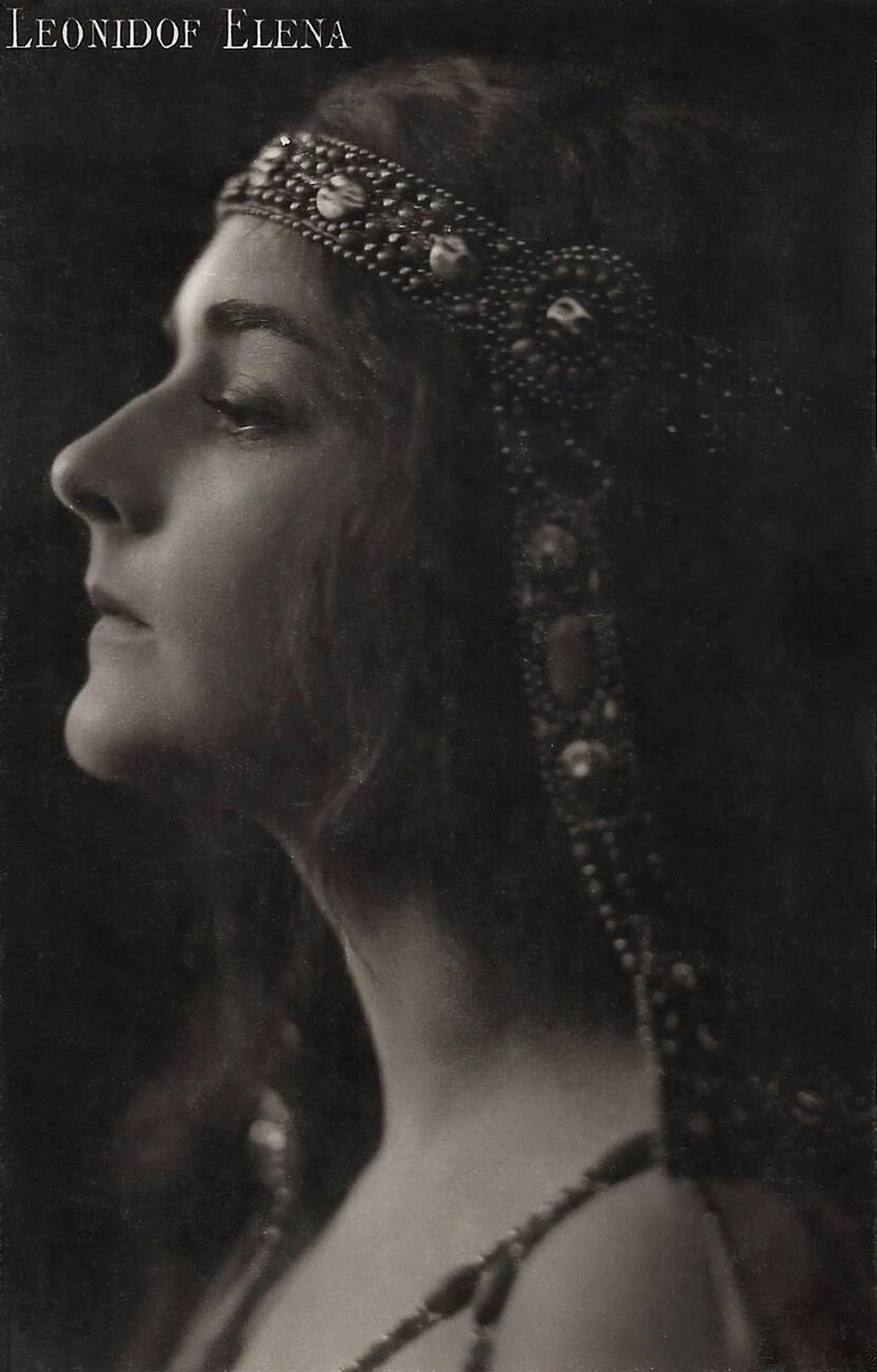
Ileana Leonidoff, 1919

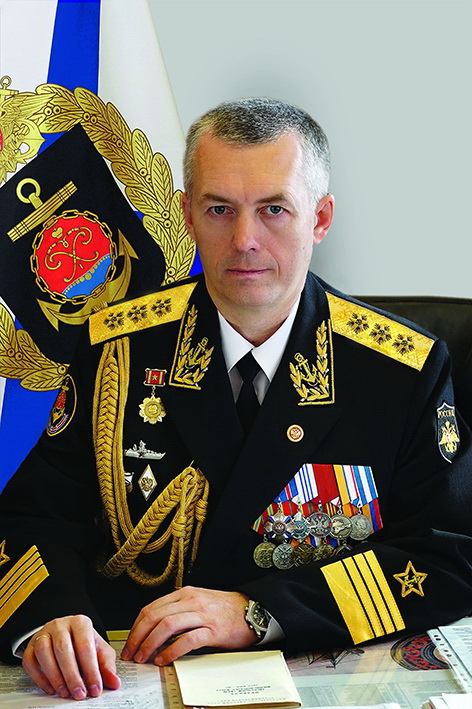
Aleksandr Nosatov, 2018

- Alla Kostromichova (born 1986) a Ukrainian fashion model and TV presenter
- Arkady Averchenko (1881–1925) a Russian playwright and satirist
- Oleksiy Bessarabov (born 1976) a Ukrainian journalist
- Igor Cassini (1915–2002) a Russian-American syndicated gossip columnist for the Hearst newspaper chain
- Aleksei Chaly (born 1961) a businessman and former de facto mayor of Sevastopol
- Denys Davydov (born 1987) a Ukrainian YouTube creator and journalist
- Alexander Galich (1918–1977) a Soviet poet, playwright, singer-songwriter and dissident
- Dmitry Gulyayev (born 1986), stage name Dimal, rapper, songwriter and entertainer, based in Malta
- Lola Gjoka (1910–1985) an Albanian pianist
- Tatiana Godovalnikova (born 1962) a Russian contemporary artist
- Rimma Kazakova (1932–2008) a Soviet/Russian poet who wrote popular songs
- Sasha Krasny (1882– 1995), a Russian poet and songwriter
- Aleksandr Kuznetsov (born 1992) a Ukrainian-Russian actor in Russian films and TV
- Ileana Leonidoff (1893–1968) émigrée actress in silent films; then dancer and choreographer
- Kseniya Mishyna (born 1989) a Ukrainian film and stage actress
- Mikhail Samoilovich Neiman (1905–1975) a Soviet physicist and academic professor
- Oleksiy Neizhpapa (born 1975) a Ukrainian vice admiral currently serving as the Commander of the Ukrainian Navy
- Aleksandr Nosatov (born 1963) an admiral in the Russian Navy
- Ivan Papanin (1894–1986) a Soviet polar explorer, scientist and Counter Admiral
- Oksana Petrusenko (1900–1940), Ukrainian opera singer
- Sergei Pinchuk (born 1971) a vice-admiral in the Russian Navy
- Olga von Root (1902–1967), Russian noblewoman, singer, and stage actress
- Mikhail Sablin (1869–1920), an admiral in the Imperial Russian Navy
- Semen Semenchenko (born 1974), a Ukrainian politician and founder of the Donbas Battalion
- Anton Shkaplerov (born 1972) a Russian cosmonaut with four spaceflights
- Antonina Shuranova (1936–2003) a Russian stage, TV and film actress
- Oleksandr Verbytskyi (1875–1958), Ukrainian architect
- Alexandra Voronin (1905–1993) the Russian wife of Norwegian fascist Vidkun Quisling

=== Sport ===
- Lyudmila Aksyonova (born 1947) 400 metre athlete, team bronze medallist at the 1976 Summer Olympics
- Aleksandr Fyodorov (born 1981) water polo player and team bronze medallist at the 2004 Summer Olympics
- Andriy Govorov (born 1992), a Ukrainian swimmer and world record holder in 50 metres butterfly
- Svitlana Matevusheva (born 1981) a sailor and team silver medallist at the 2004 Summer Olympics
- Alexander Onischuk (born 1975) a Ukrainian-American chess Grandmaster
- Galina Prozumenshchikova (1948–2015) a Soviet breaststroke swimmer; five Olympic medals in 1964, 1968 and 1972
- Marina Durunda (born 1997) an Azerbaijani rhythmic gymnast; finalist at the 2016 Summer Olympics

== Gallery ==
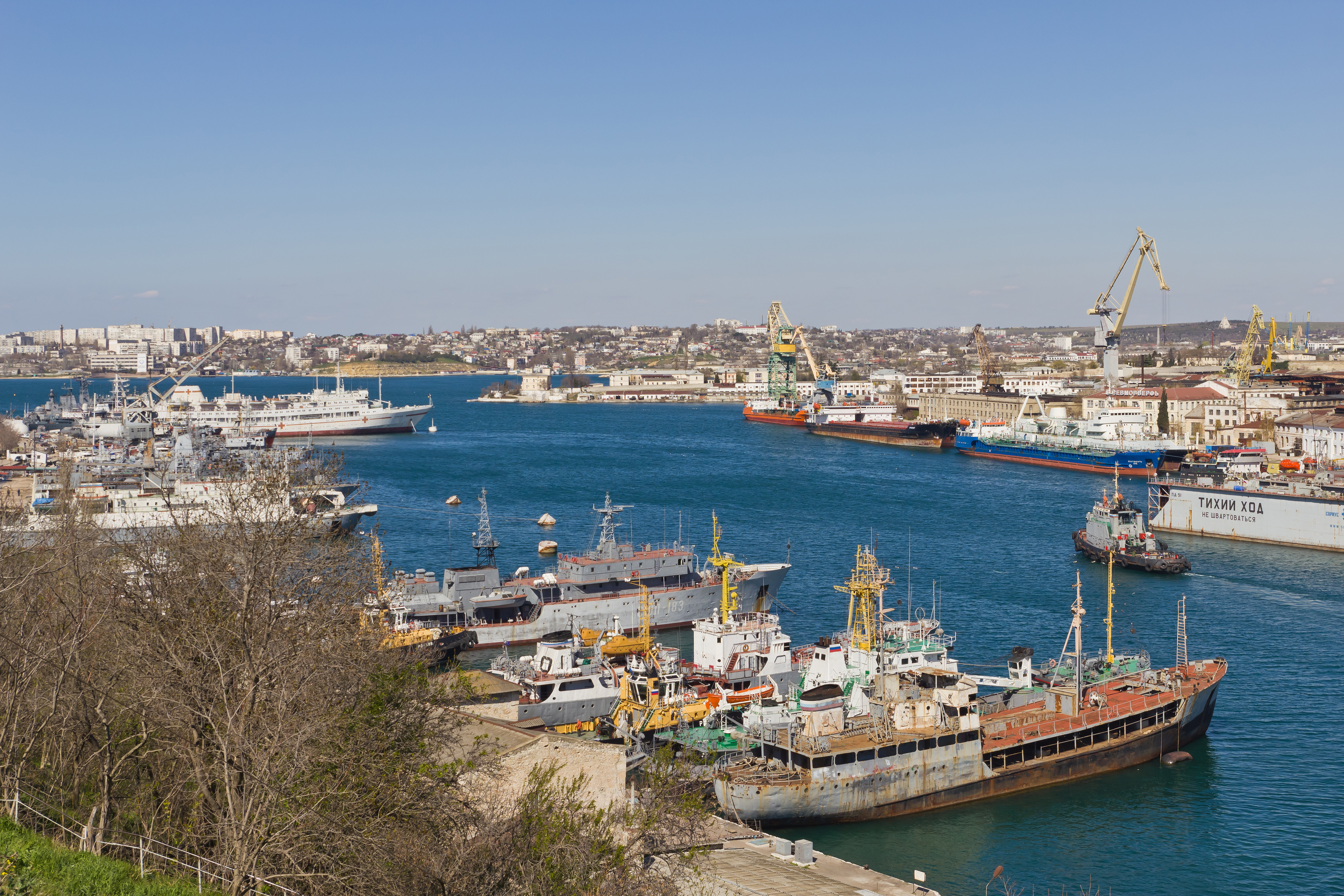
View of Sevastopol

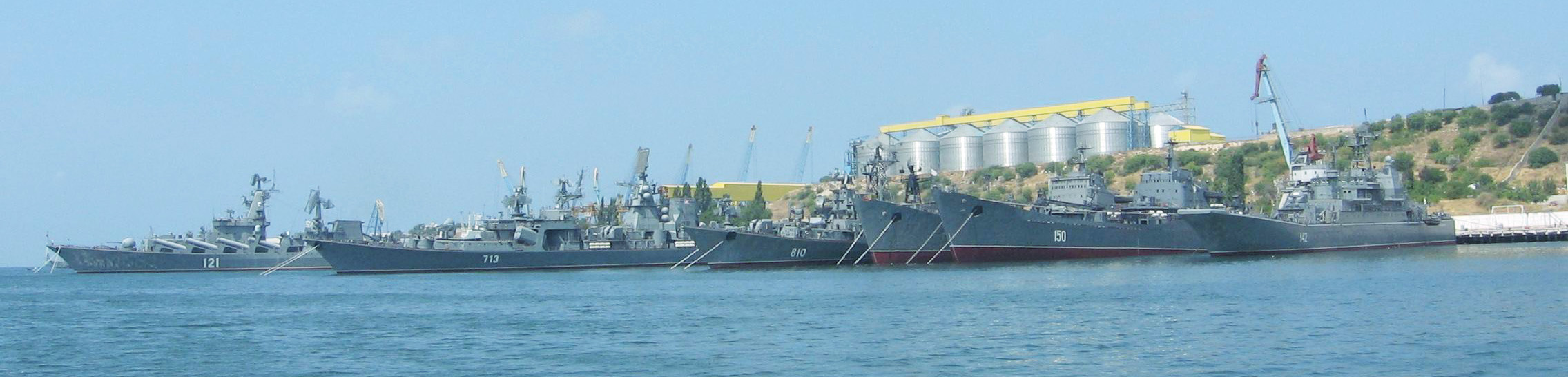
Ships of the Black Sea Fleet docked in Sevastopol

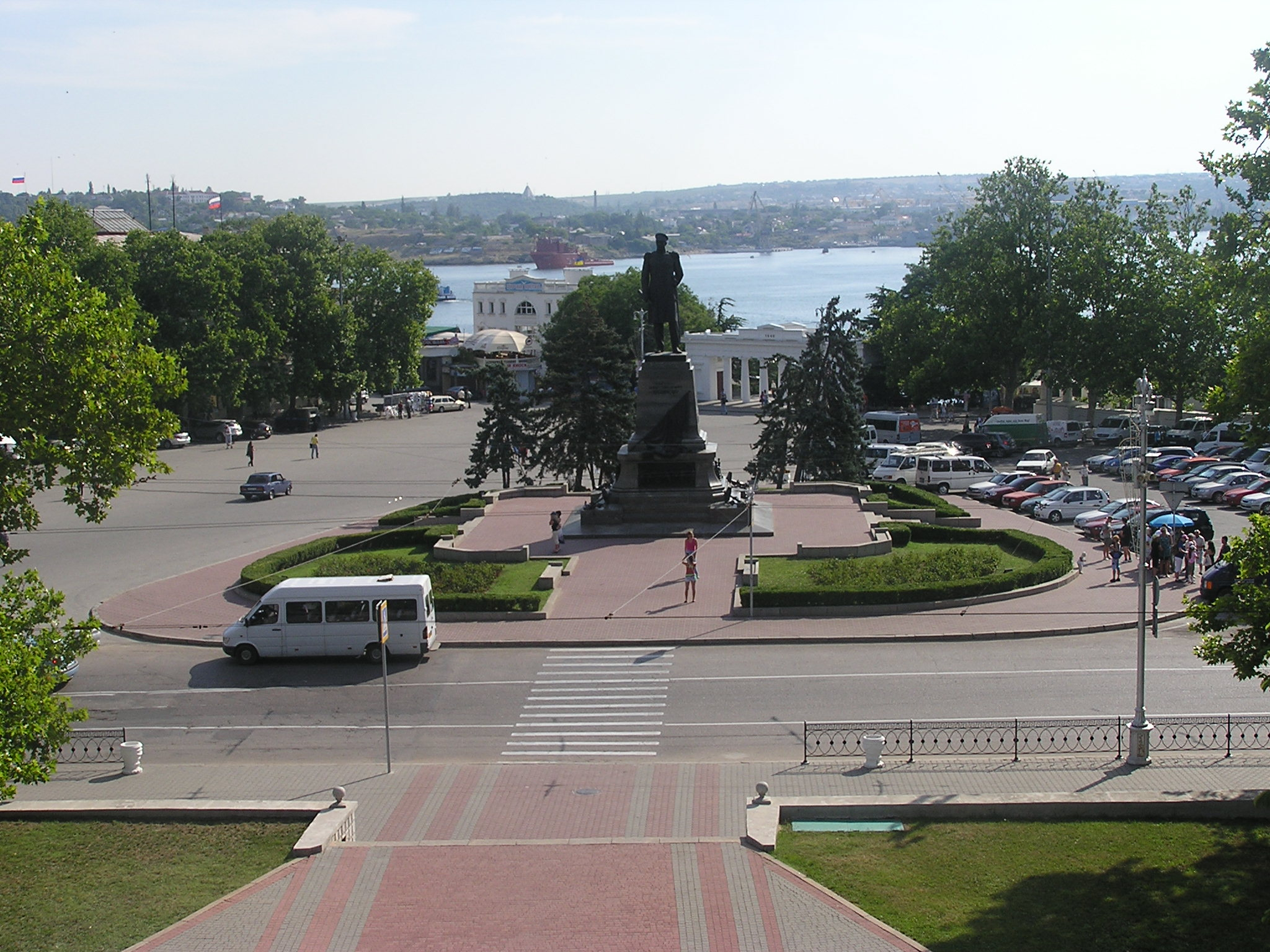
Nakhimov Square

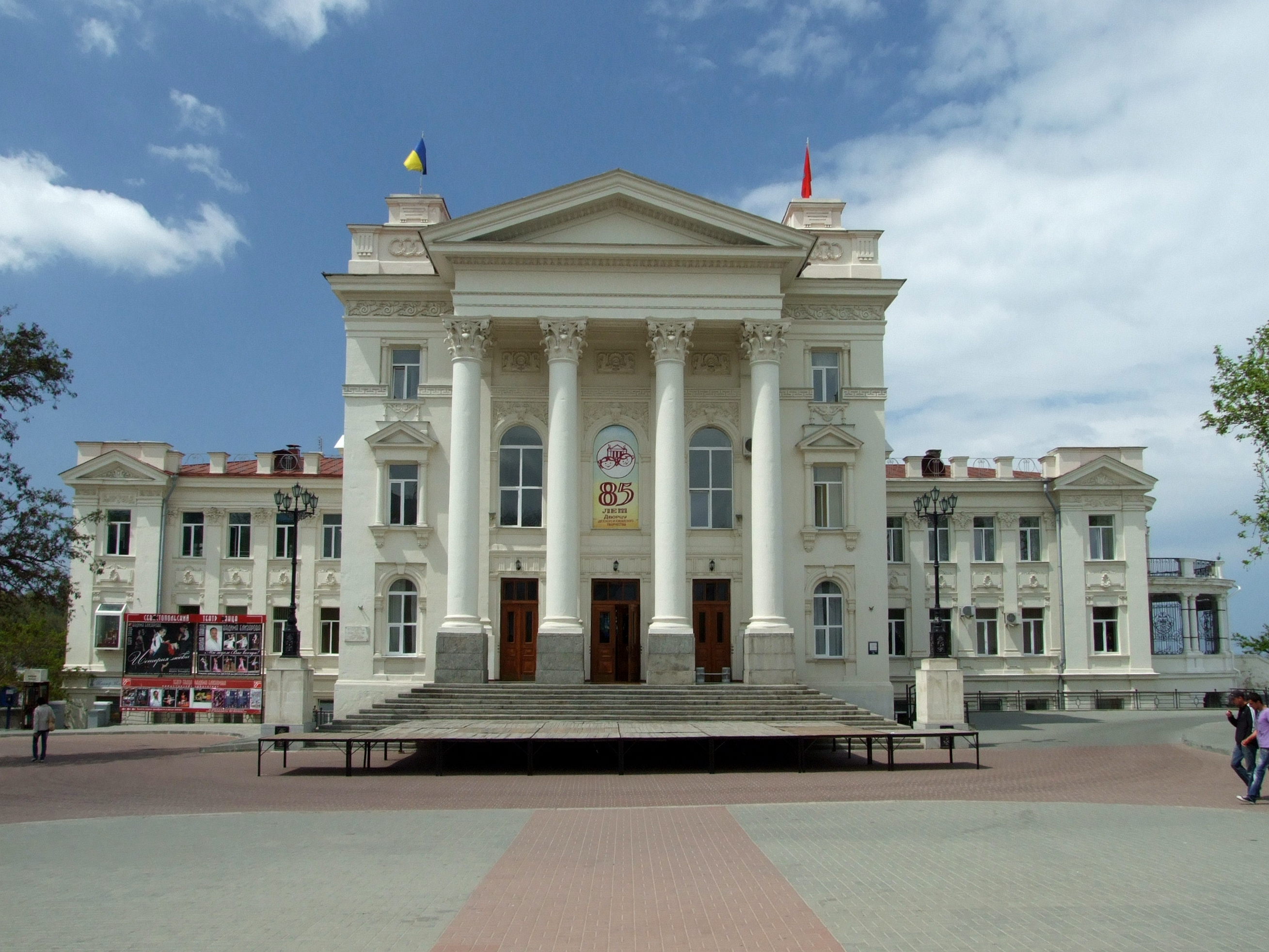
Palace of Culture

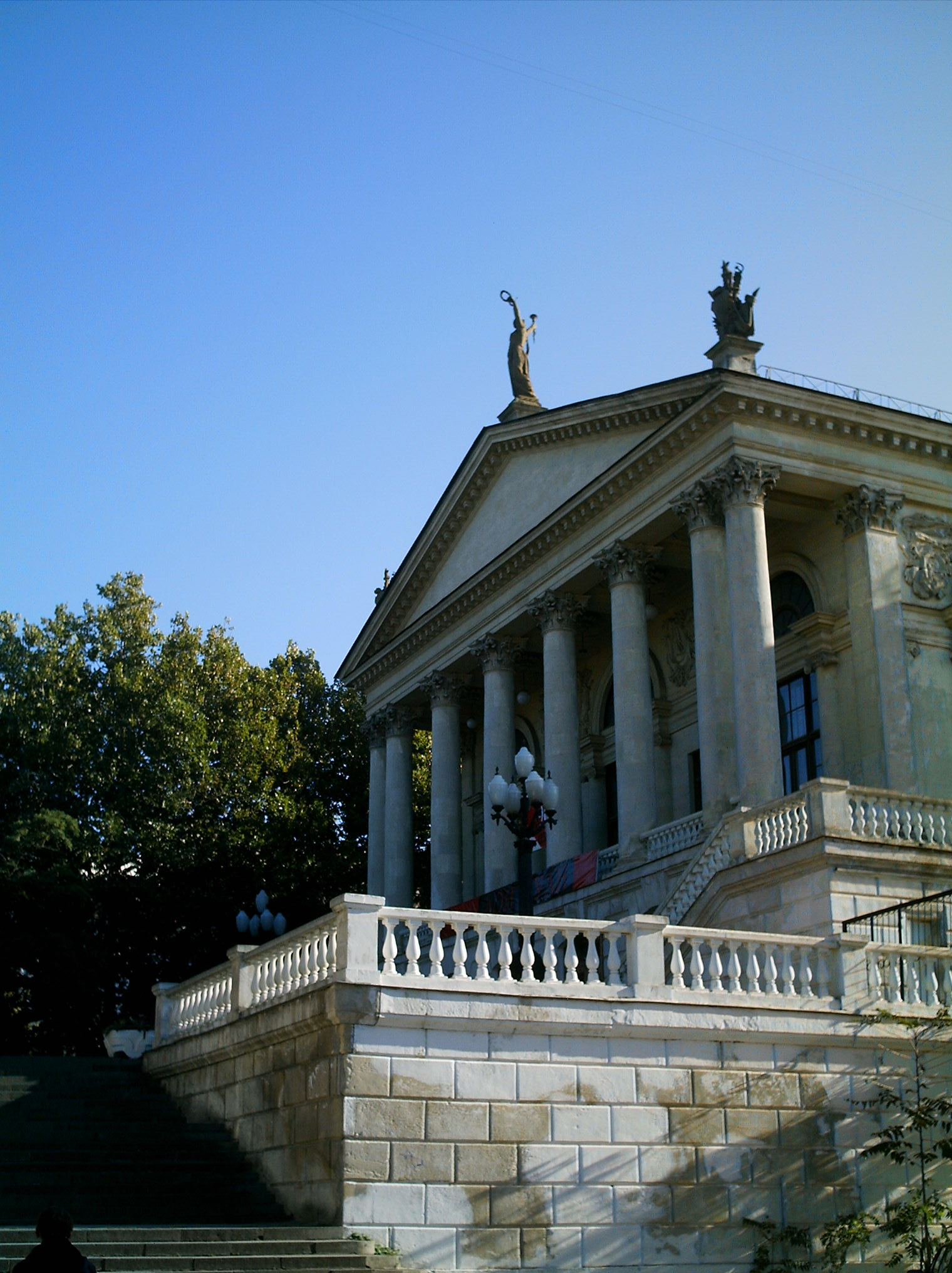
Lunacharsky Theater

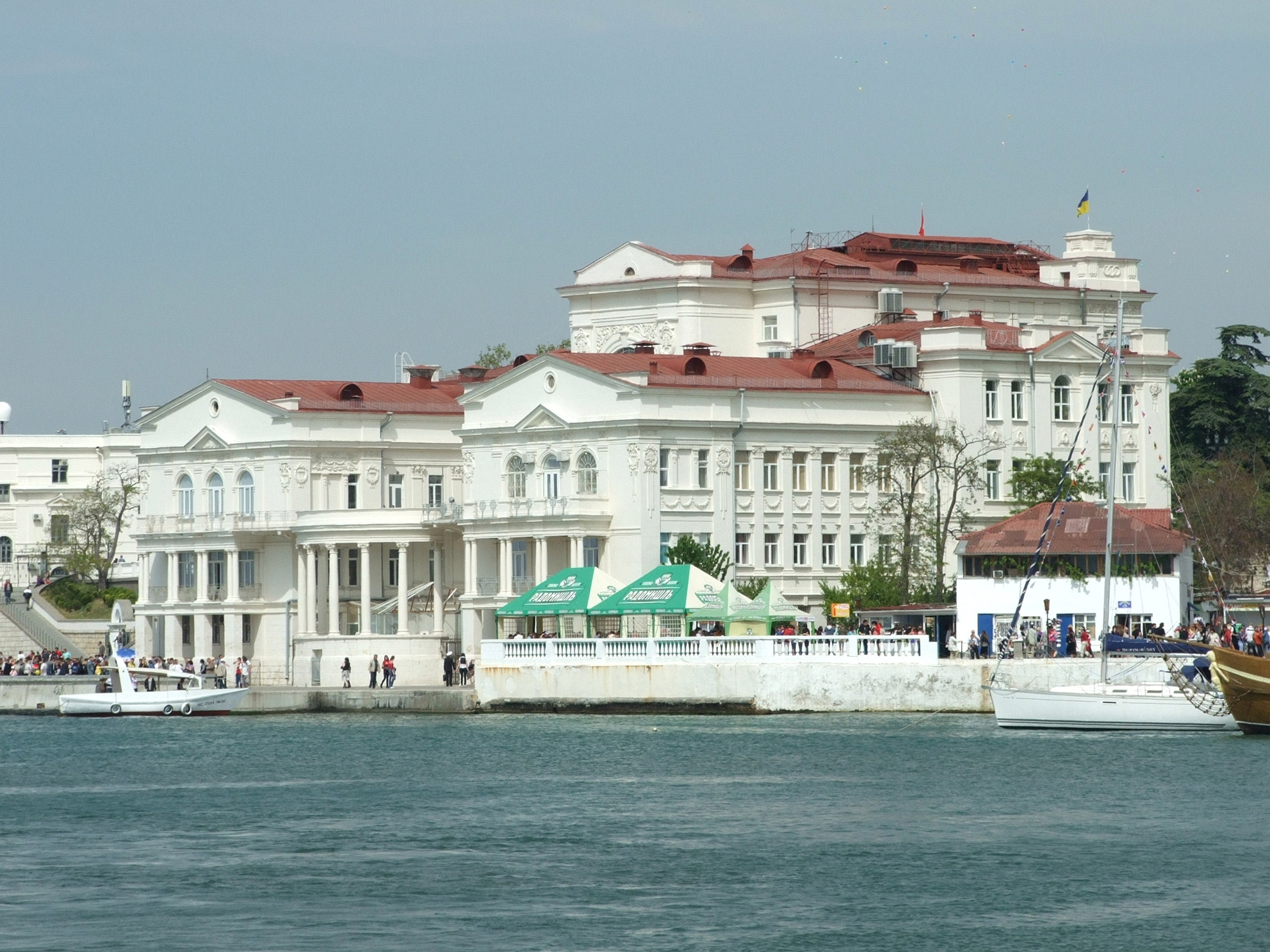
Artillery Bay

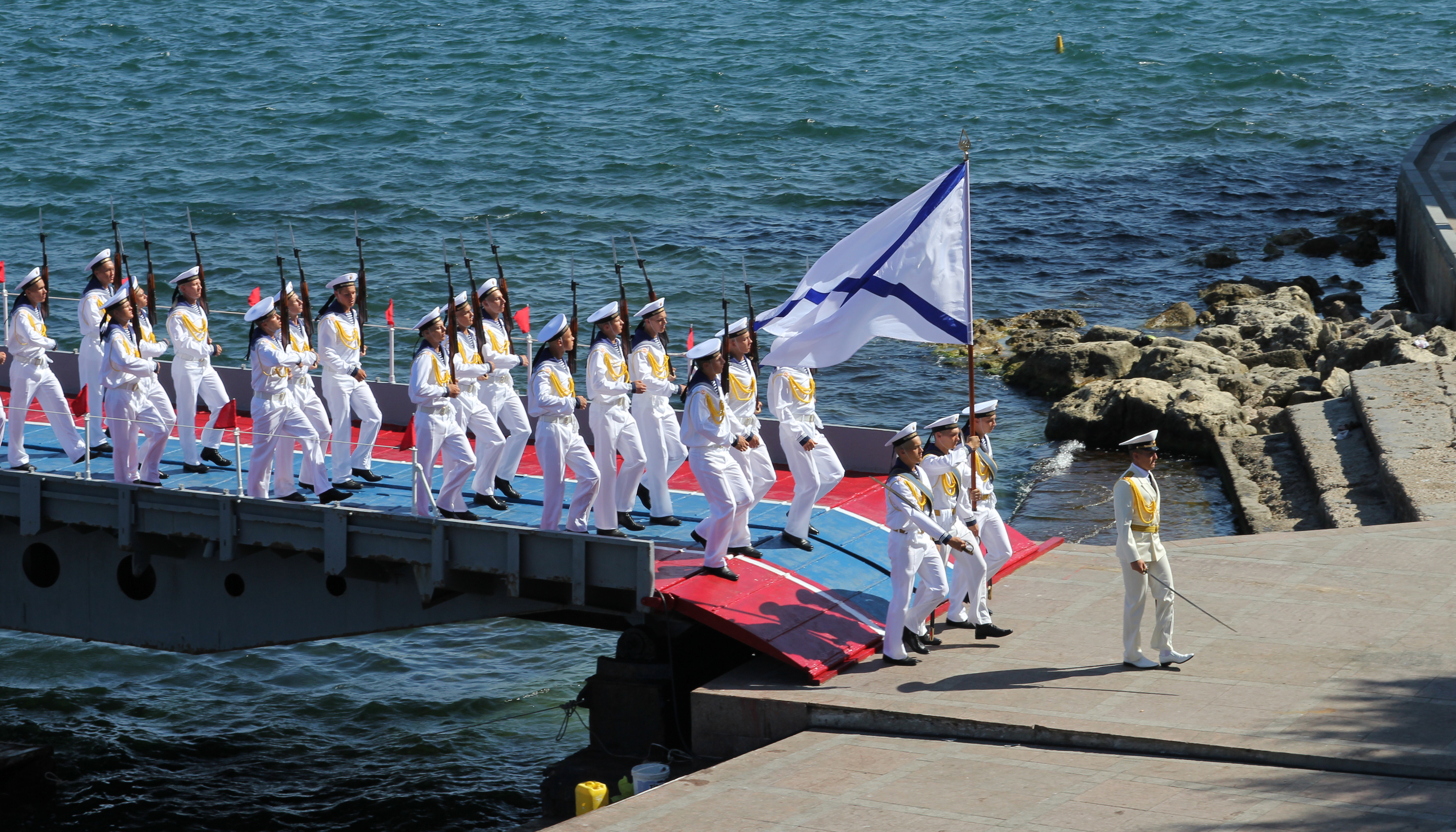
2012 Navy Day joint celebration (Russian AF)

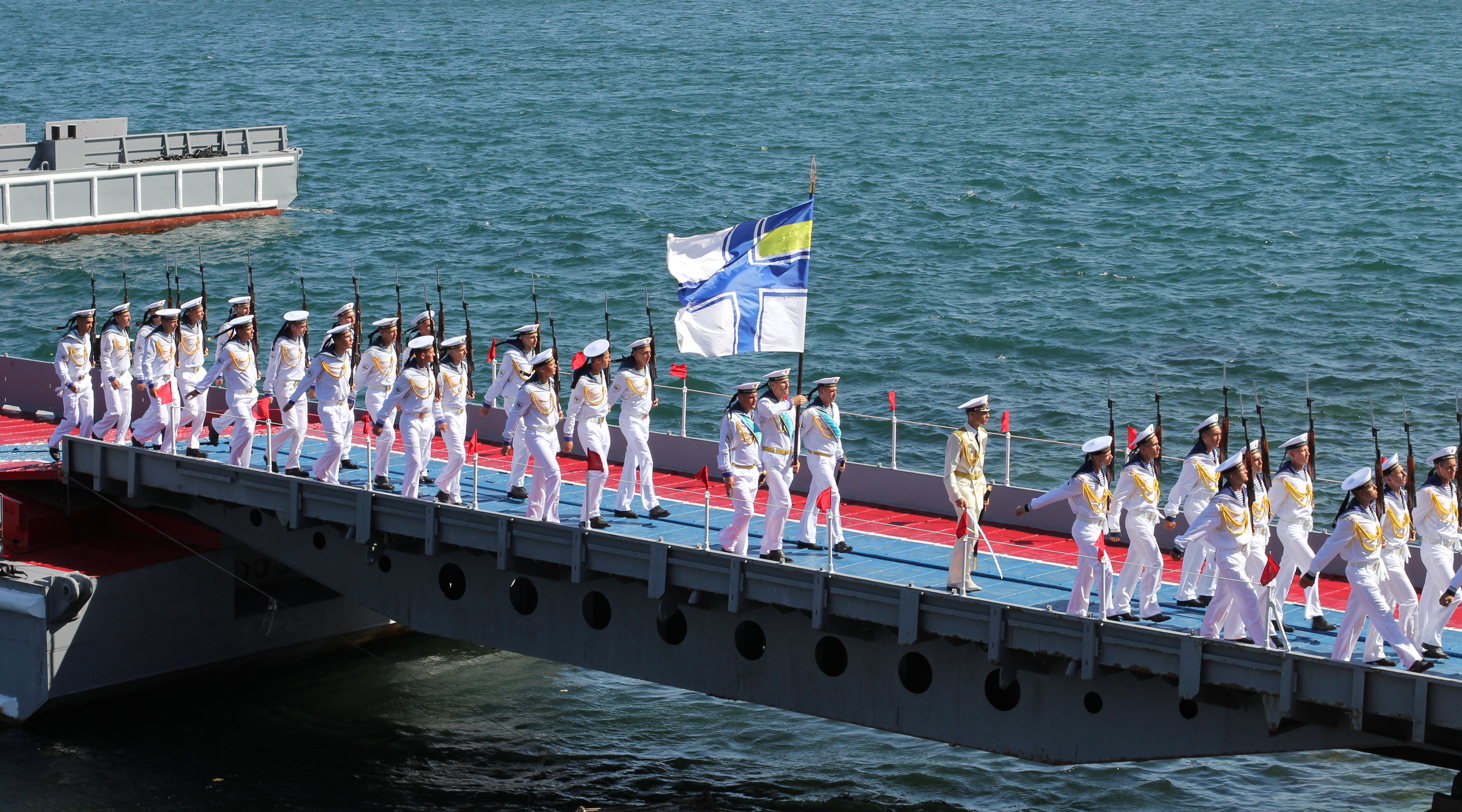
2012 Navy Day joint celebration (Ukrainian AF)

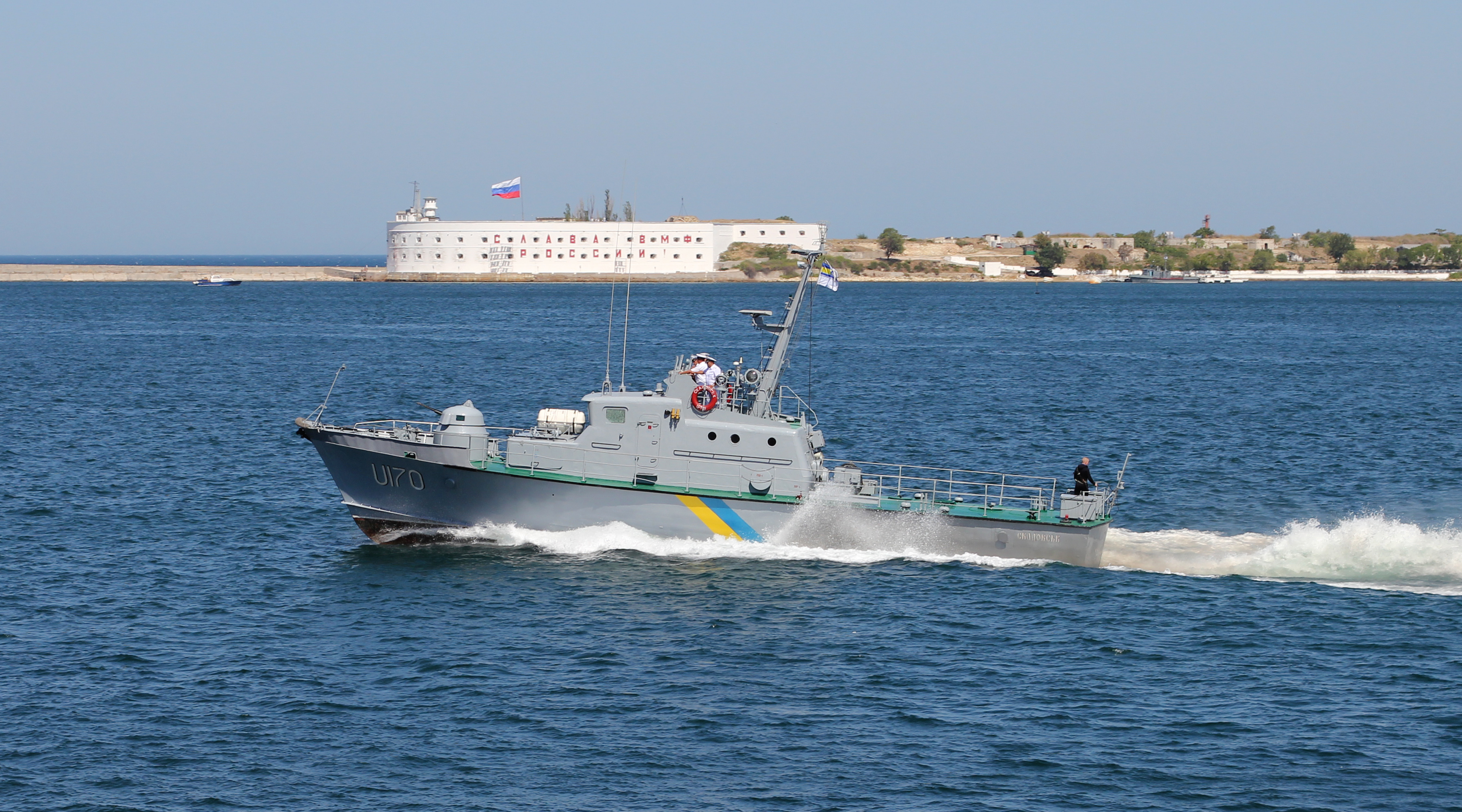
Ukrainian Navy artillery boat U170 in the Bay of Sevastopol

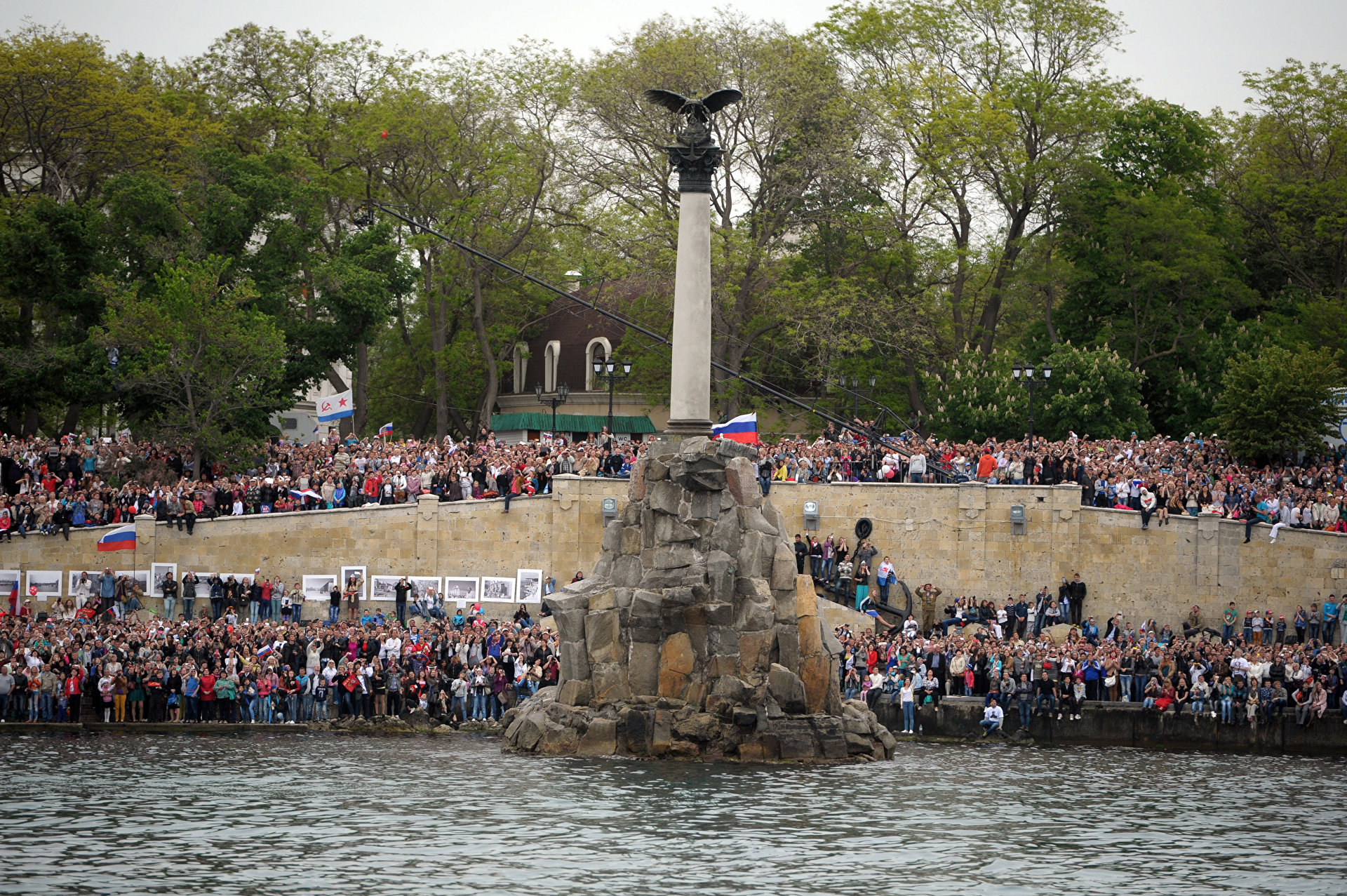
Victory Day in Sevastopol, 9 May 2014

== See also ==
- 2121 Sevastopol – asteroid discovered in 1971 by Soviet astronomer Tamara Mikhailovna Smirnova and named after the city.
- Sebastopol, Victoria
- Novorossiysk (new planned headquarters of the Black Sea Fleet)
