= Baydar =

Baydar may refer to:

- Baydar (surname), list of people with the surname
- Baydar, (Bayramlı, Shamkir), village in Azerbaijan
- Baydar Gate, mountain pass in Crimea
- Baydar Rafiah, village in northern Syria
- Baydar Shamsu, village in Idlib, Syria
- Baydar Valley, valley in Crimea
