= Port of Sevastopol =

Main port serving the Crimean Peninsula

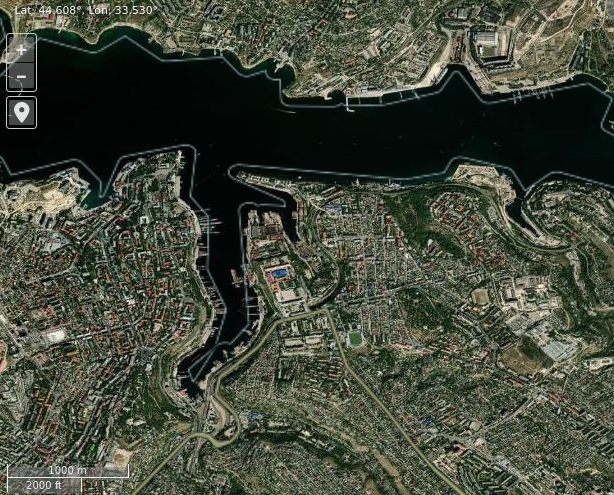
- Satellite imagery of the Port of Sevastopol
- Interactive map of Port of Sevastopol

Location
- Country: Ukraine
- Location: Sevastopol
- Coordinates: 44°36′56″N 33°31′35″E

Details
- Opened: 1875
- Owned by: Sea/River Fleet Administration (government)
- Type of Harbor: Natural/Artificial

Statistics
- Website www.morport.sebastopol.ua

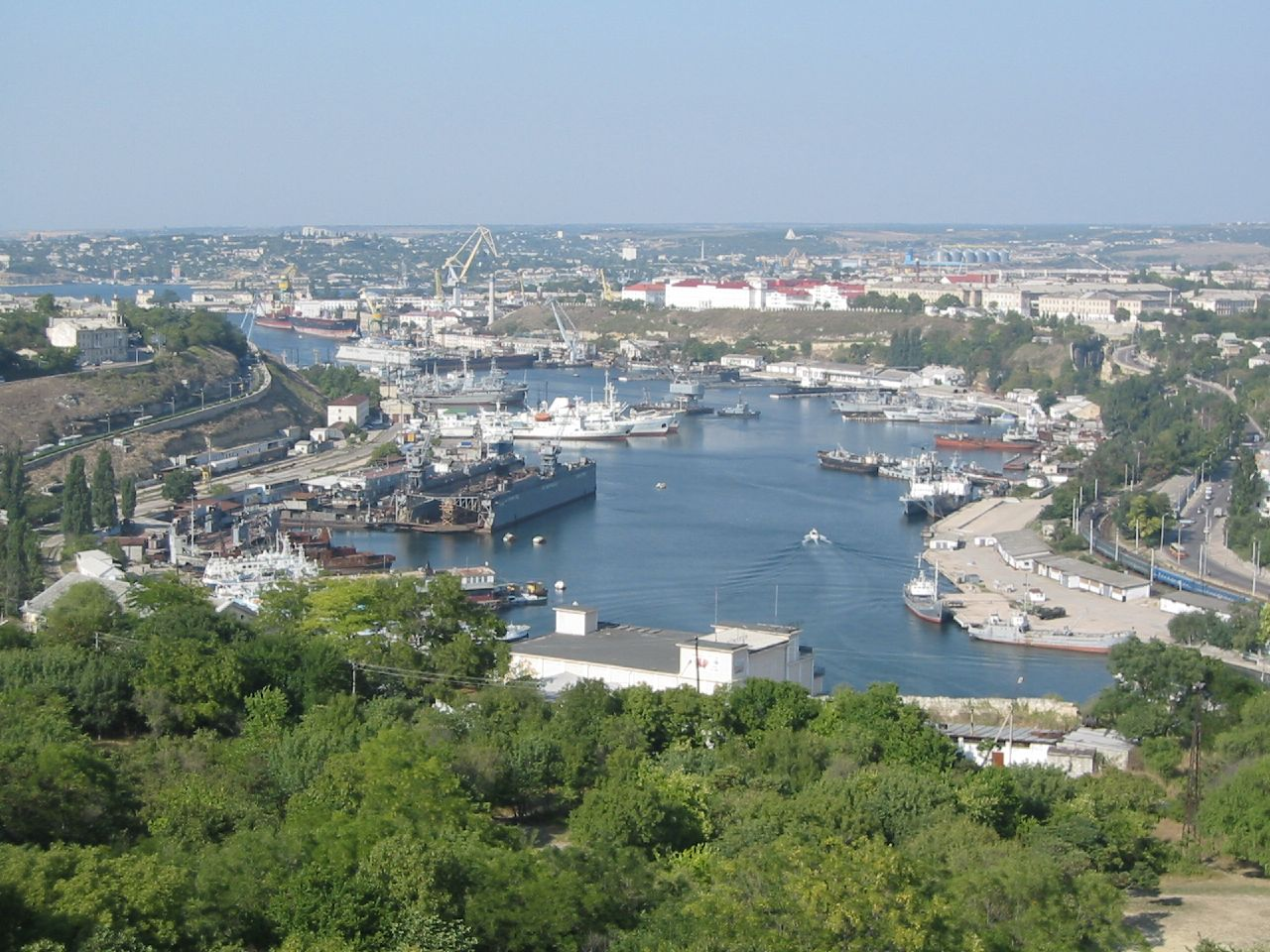
Sevastopol port in 2005

Sevastopol Marine Trade Port (SMTP) is a port in Sevastopol. It is located mainly at the Bay of Sevastopol, and at smaller bays around the Heracles Peninsula. The port infrastructure is fully integrated with the city of Sevastopol and naval bases of the Russian Navy and the Black Sea Fleet.

The port had previously been under the sovereignty of Ukraine following the dissolution of the Soviet Union in 1991 and a formal partition treaty was signed by Ukraine and Russia in 1997. Portions of the port were owned by the private sector.. The port came under full Russian control when Russia occupied the Crimean Peninsula in early 2014 after a highly criticized referendum known as the 2014 Crimean status referendum.

== History ==
A settlement was formed at the Sevastopol port in June 1783 as a base for a naval squadron under the name Akhtiar (White Cliff), by Rear Admiral Thomas MacKenzie (Foma Fomich Makenzi), a native Scot in Russian service; soon after Russia annexed the Crimean Khanate. Five years earlier, Alexander Suvorov ordered that earthworks be erected along the harbor and Russian troops be placed there. In February 1784, Catherine the Great ordered Grigory Potemkin to build a fortress there and call it Sevastopol. The realization of the initial building plans fell to Captain Fyodor Ushakov who in 1788 was named commander of the port and of the Black Sea squadron. It became an important naval base and later a commercial seaport. In 1797, under an edict issued by Emperor Paul I, the military stronghold was again renamed to Akhtiar. Finally, on April 29 (May 10), 1826, the Russian Senate returned the city's name to Sevastopol.

During World War II, the port of Sevastopol withstood intensive bombardment by the Germans in 1941–42, supported by their Italian and Romanian allies during the Battle of Sevastopol.

The port was leased to Russia on a long-term lease after the dissolution of the Soviet Union in the early 1990s.

In early March 2014, during the Russian invasion of Ukraine, Russian sailors scuttled several naval vessels to act as blockships at the entrance to Donuzlav Bay and the port of Sevastapol, in an attempt to prevent Ukrainian navy ships berthed in the port from gaining access to the Black Sea. Ships sunk included the hull of the naval cruiser Ochakov and a diving support vessel of BM-416-class (approximately 35 tonnes (39 tons)).

== Location and defined borders ==
The territory of the port was defined by the declaration of Cabinet of Ukraine on October 25, 2002 "About aquatorium of the Sevastopol Marine Trade Port". The territory defined was limited by lines that outstretch from extreme points of the Sevastopol city administration border at the Black Sea coast perpendicularly to the coastline and allotted water area, except:

- Kamysheva Bay that belongs to responsibility of the Sevastopol Marine Fish Port
- Territory leased by the Russian Federation for the Black Sea Fleet
  - Yuzhnaya Bay (Yuzhnaya bukhta; Южная бухта)
- Territory that is a responsibility zone of the Ministry of Defense of Ukraine
  - Pishchana Bay
  - Striletska Bay
  - Bay of Abramov
  - Balaklava Bay
- Territory of Balaclava Bay that is under the responsibility of the State Border Service of Ukraine

== Divisions ==
=== Passenger terminal ===
Passenger terminal is located at the pier #143. Along with terminal there is a building of customs.

=== Cargo district ===
There is a cargo district located at the eastern end of the Bay of Sevastopol near the city of Inkerman (Little Inkerman) and mouth of the Chorna River. It consists of two transloading complexes PK-1 and PK-2.

Transloading complex #1 (PK-1) has capabilities to handle transferring cargo from water transport onto ground transport such as automotive and rail. The complex is specialized to handle cabotage sand, scrap metal (ferrous and non-ferrous metals) in bulk, and coal export. Transloading complex #2 (PK-2) has an area of 47,883 m^{2} (515,410 sq ft). It is based around the pier #56 that has a length of 112 running meters and depth of 8.25 m (27.1 ft).

=== South Sevastopol ===
South Sevastopol is a ship maintenance facility. The factory has a freight-handling complex, ship maintenance shop, own design bureau, builds yachts. It also rents out various vessels such as floating cranes, tugboats, others.

== Strategic value ==
The Port of Sevastopol is considered a key hold for maritime routes between the Black Sea and the Sea of Marmara, and, therefore, the Mediterranean Sea and the Atlantic Ocean. The port is one of the few warm deepwater ports available to Russia in the Black Sea. Russia leased the port from Ukraine, until its annexation in 2014. Access to the port is considered one of the main factors that sparked the 2014 Crimean crisis between Ukraine and Russia, and Russia's subsequent military intervention on Crimea.
