= Baydar Nature Reserve =

Nature reserve in Sevastopol, Crimea

Baidarka Nature Reserve
- Байдарський заказник (Ukrainian); Байдарский заказник (Russian); Baydar manzara qoruğı (Crimean Tatar)
- IUCN category IV (habitat/species management area)
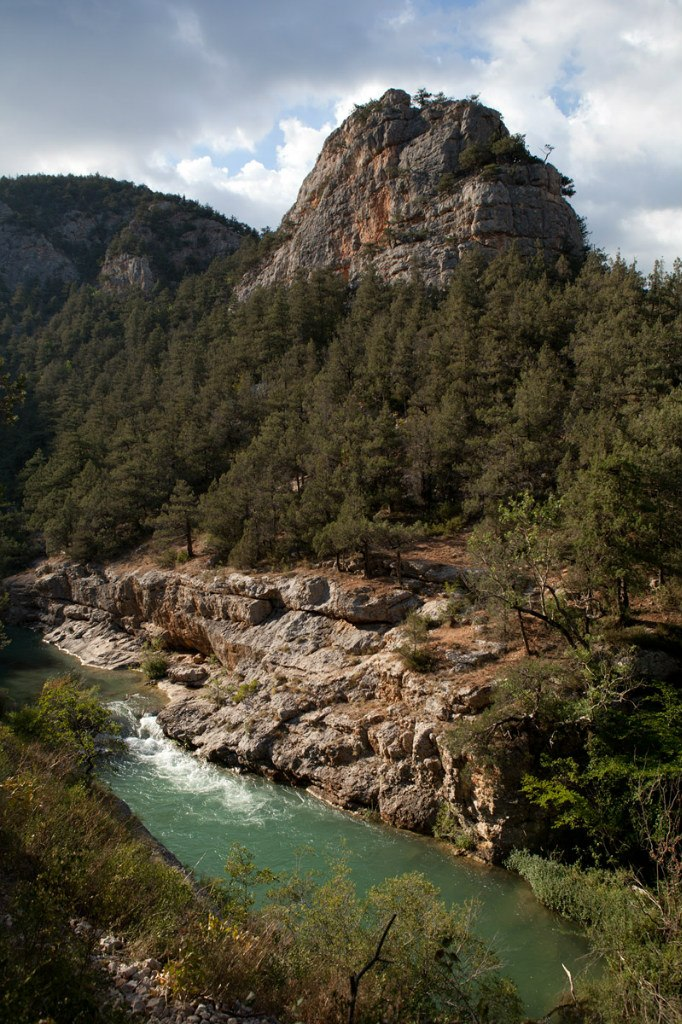

- Location within Sevastopol Location within Crimea Location within Ukraine
- Nearest city: Sevastopol
- Coordinates: 44°27′30″N 33°49′00″E
- Area: 21,231 ha (212.31 km^{2})
- Established: 31 May 1990

Baydar Nature Reserve (Ukrainian: Байда́рський заказник, romanized: Baidarskyi zakaznyk; Russian: Байдарский заказник, romanized: Baydarsky zakaznik) is a regional nature reserve (zakaznik) located in the city of Sevastopol in Crimea, a region internationally recognised as Ukraine but occupied by Russia since 2014. The Baydar Nature Reserve is part of the Baydar Valley, and borders the nature reserves of Cape Aya and Yalta Mountain-Forest Nature Reserve.

== Description ==
Located in the Baydar Valley, the Baydar Nature Reserve is noted by the Encyclopedia of Modern Ukraine for its multi-tiered appearance, including elements of both the Baydar Valley and the Crimean Mountains, in particular its Main Range. The reserve is home to several canyons (including the Chorna Canyon, itself formerly a nature reserve), ridges, and karst landforms. Approximately 77% of the reserve is covered by forests, primarily juniper, oaks, ash, beech, hornbeam, and pistachio. A total of 54 plant species and 41 animal species live in the reserve, among them rare species.

An important part of the Baydar Nature Reserve is its role in water protection. The Chorna river runs through the reserve, as do several waterfalls. The Chorna reservoir, Crimea's largest reservoir, is also included in the reserve. A total of 64,000,000 m^{3} (6.4×10^{10} L) is located in the reserve, providing drinking water to the city of Sevastopol.

The reserve borders Cape Aya and Hasforta to the west and Yalta Mountain-Forest Nature Reserve and Ay Petri yayla to the east. It was declared a landscape zakaznik of national importance on 31 May 1990 by the Cabinet of Ministers of the Ukrainian Soviet Socialist Republic.
