= Sevastopol Naval Base =

Russian-controlled naval base in occupied Crimea

- Севастопольская военно-морская база Севастопольська військово-морська база
- Sevastopol, Crimea
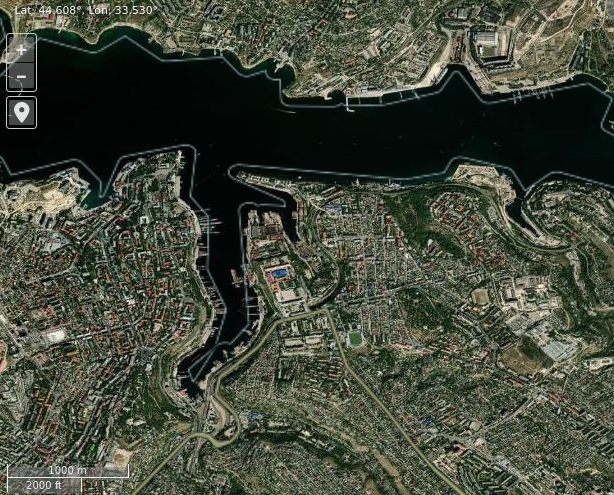
- Satellite imagery of Sevastopol naval base

Site information
- Type: Naval base
- Owner: Disputed: Russia (de facto); Ukraine (de jure)
- Operator: Black Sea Fleet
- Controlled by: Russia
- Condition: Operational

Location
- Location within Crimea
- Coordinates: 44°36′28″N 33°31′48″E

Site history
- Built: 1772–1783
- Built by: Russian Empire
- In use: 1783–present

Garrison information
- Garrison: Black Sea Fleet
- Occupants: Russian Navy

The Sevastopol Naval Base (Russian: Севастопольская военно-морская база; Ukrainian: Севастопольська військово-морська база) is a naval base located in Sevastopol, in the disputed Crimean Peninsula. The base is used by the Russian Navy, and it is the main base of the Black Sea Fleet. Internationally, the base is recognised as part of Ukrainian territory under Russian occupation.

== Geography ==
The Sevastopol Naval Base is almost completely located within the administrative territory of Sevastopol. It has several berths located in several bays of Sevastopol – Severnaya (Russian: Северная бухта; Ukrainian: Північна бухта), Yuzhnaya (Russian: Южная бухта; Ukrainian: Південна бухта), Karantinnaya (Russian: Карантинная бухта; Ukrainian: Карантинна бухта) and others.

== History ==
=== Tsarist Russia ===
The port was renovated in 1772, while the Russo-Turkish War was still ongoing, and was finished in 1783, following the annexation of Crimea by the Russian Empire. On 13 May 1783, the first eleven ships of the Imperial Russian Navy reached the Sevastopol Bay.

During the Crimean War (1853–1856), all large ships were scuttled in the entrance to the bay in 1854 to prevent the entry of enemy ships into the bay. The city defended itself for 349 days against the allied armies of France, United Kingdom, Ottoman Empire and Piedmont-Sardinia. Eventually, the Russians had to abandon Sevastopol on 9 September 1855.

On 29 October 1914, during a surprise attack as part of the Black Sea raid, the Ottoman Navy battlecruiser Yavuz (formerly SMS Goeben of the Imperial German Navy) shelled the Sevastopol base and attacked various Russian ships in the vicinity. Within days of this seemingly relatively militarily minor encounter, the Ottoman Empire formally joined in World War I, fighting against the Russian Empire and its Entente allies.

=== Soviet Russia ===
During World War I, the Imperial German Army occupied Sevastopol on 1 May 1918 despite the ongoing negotiations to reach the Treaty of Brest-Litovsk. After further negotiations, the most important ships of the Black Sea Fleet in Tsemes Bay in front of Novorossiysk were sunk by their crews.

During the Crimean campaign (1941–1942) of World War II, the Black Sea Fleet of the Soviet Navy was able to fend off the first air attack by the Nazi German Luftwaffe. However, after the city defended itself for 250 days, Sevastopol fell to the Germans on 4 July 1942.

=== Ukrainian control ===
After the dissolution of the Soviet Union at the end of 1991, the former Soviet Black Sea Fleet initially came under jurisdiction of United Armed Forces of the Commonwealth of Independent States. The ownership over Black Sea Fleet as well as its home base in Sevastopol became a subject of dispute between sovereign Russia and Ukraine.

In 1997, the Russian Federation and Ukraine signed the Partition Treaty on the Status and Conditions of the Black Sea Fleet which ended the dispute. Ukraine which allowed the Russian-allocated ships to remain on Ukrainian territory until 2017, sharing the Sevastopol Bay along with ships of the Ukrainian Navy.

The lease arrangements were altered by the 2010 Kharkiv Pact, which tied a 30% reduction in the price of natural gas charged by Russia since 2009 to the continued occupation of the naval base until 2042.

From then on, Russia paid an annual lease to Ukraine for the use of the base until the annexation-eviction occurred in 2014.

=== Russian control (2014–present) ===
Since the annexation of Crimea by the Russian Federation in 2014, the naval base is again under Russian control.

==== Post-invasion of 2022 ====
On 13 September 2023, Storm Shadow missiles were used in a strike against the port of Sevastopol, seriously damaging the Kilo-class submarine Rostov na Donu and seriously damaging (according to some sources, beyond repair) the Ropucha-class landing ship Minsk.

On 22 September 2023, at least three Storm Shadow missiles hit Black Sea Fleet headquarters in Sevastopol, reportedly killing Admiral Viktor Nikolayevich Sokolov, commander of the Black Sea Fleet. Russia later released videos purporting to show him alive, while Ukraine later said it was re-evaluating his claimed death.

On 25 September 2023, Russian authorities have announced that they would demolish the existing headquarters of the Black Sea Fleet.

== Gallery ==
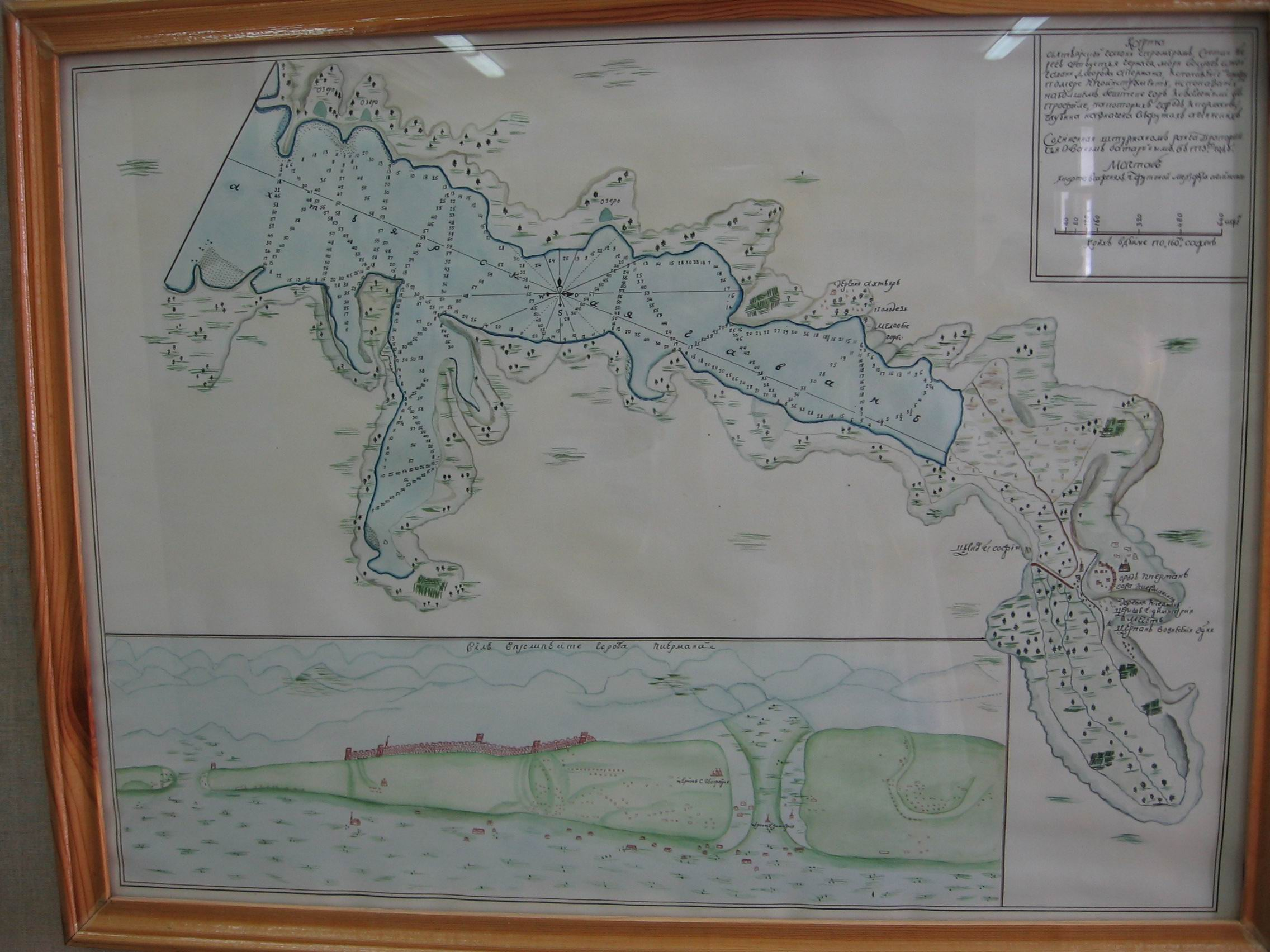
The first map of the Akhtiar (Sevastopol) Bay, created by navigator Ivan Baturin and his team, 1773.

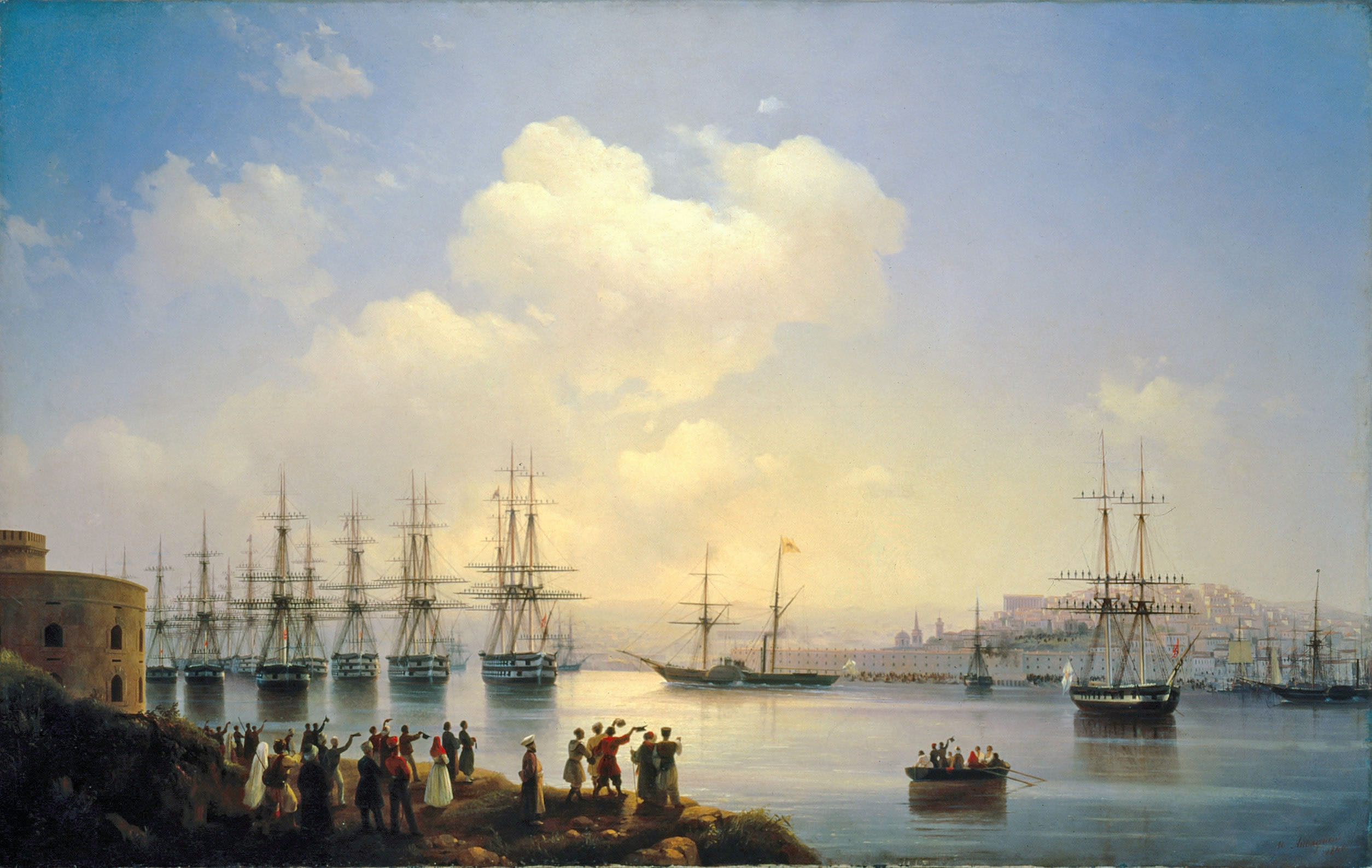
The Russian Squadron on the Sebastopol Roads (1846), by Ivan Aivazovsky.

Map of Sevastopol, 1904.

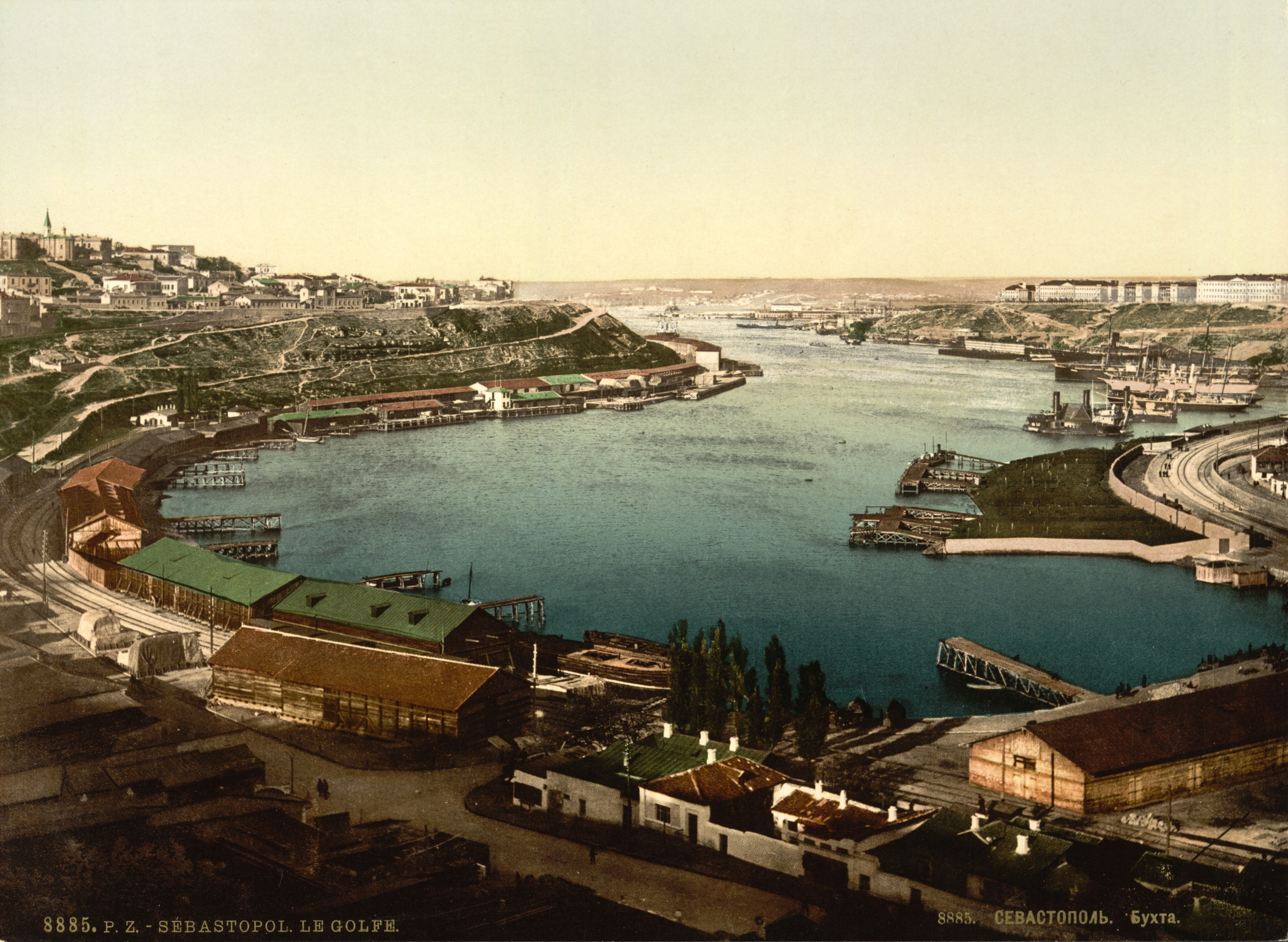
Color view of part of the port, 1905.

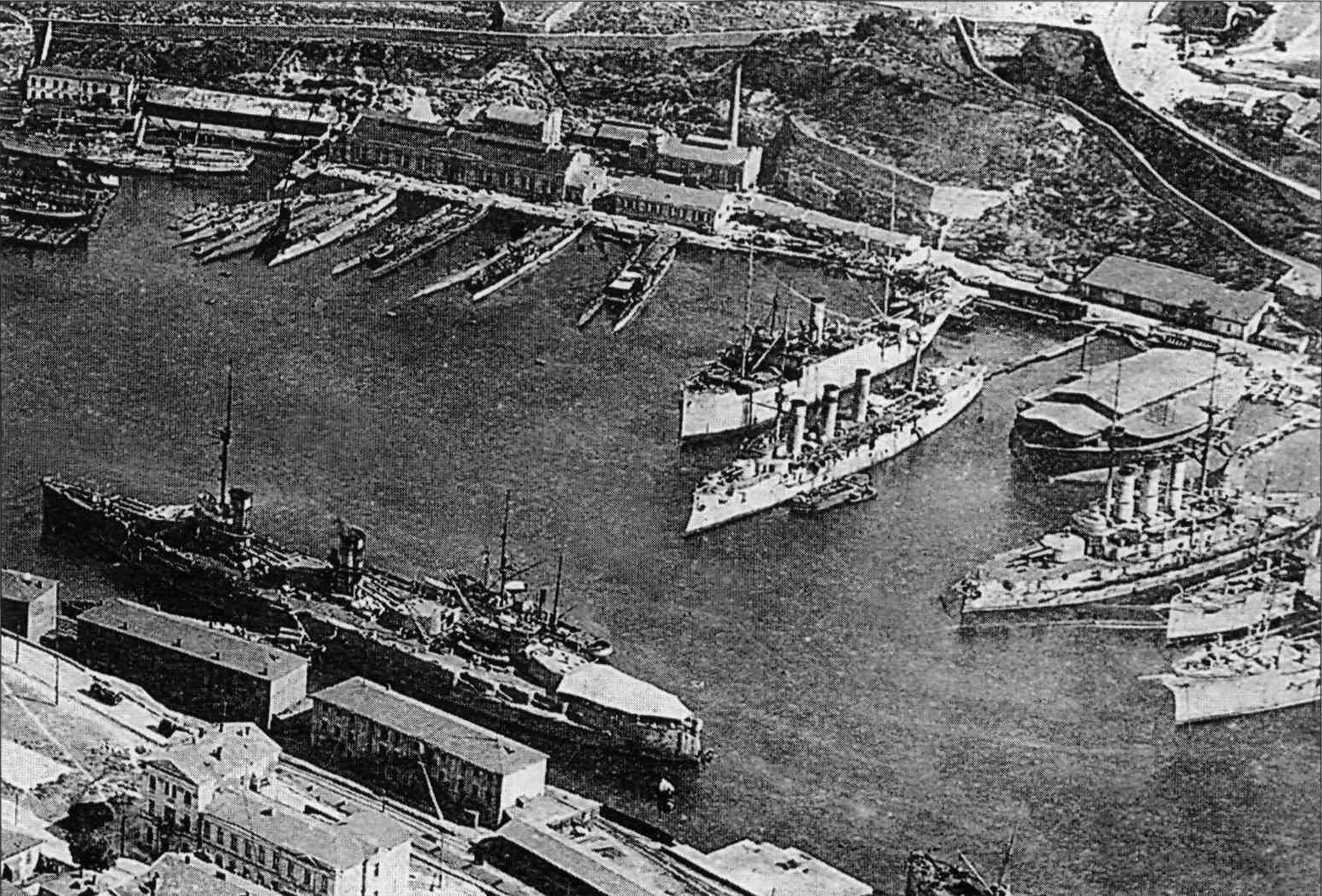
Aerial view of the port, August 1918.

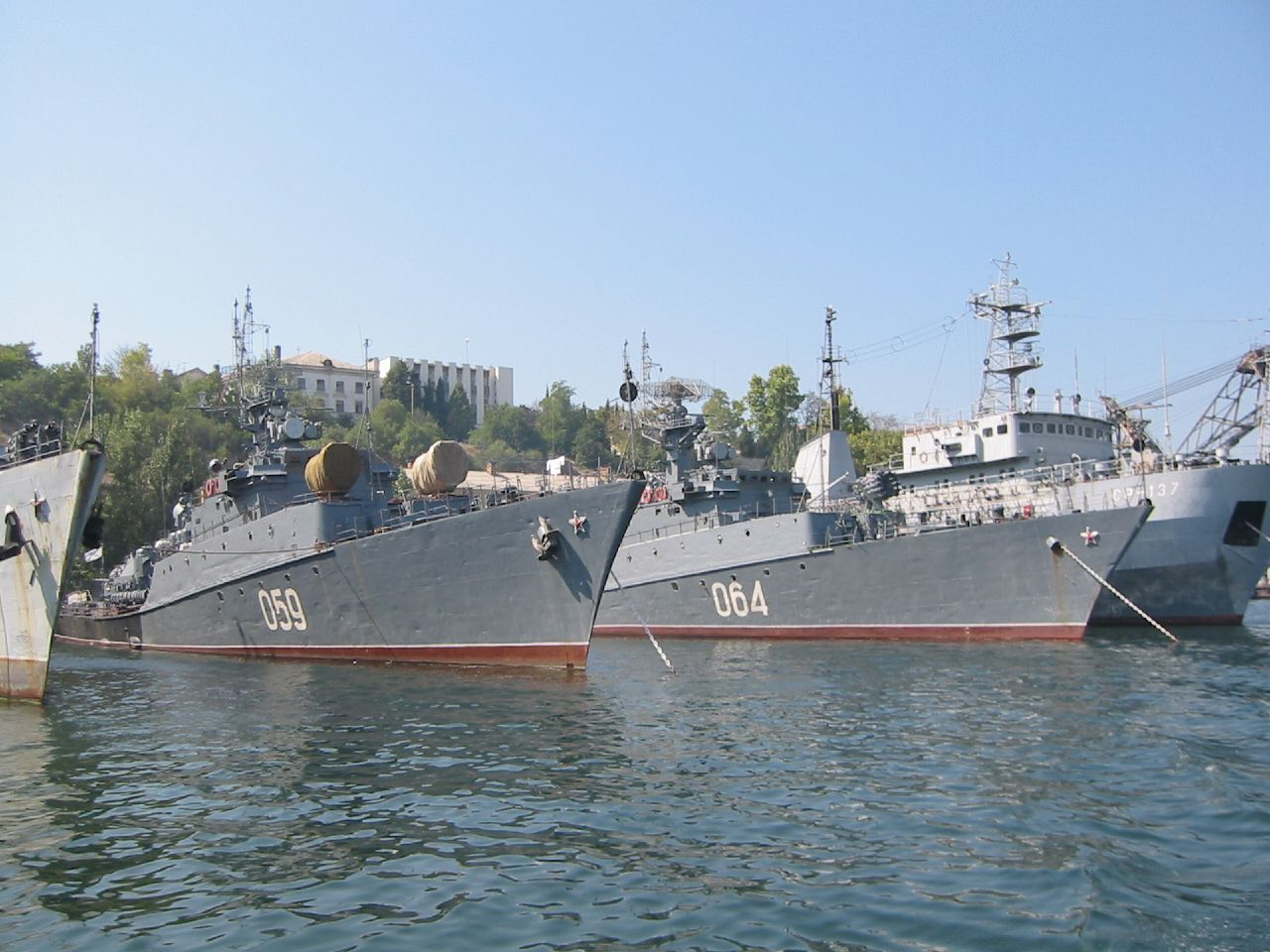
Russian ships in Sevastopol, 2005.

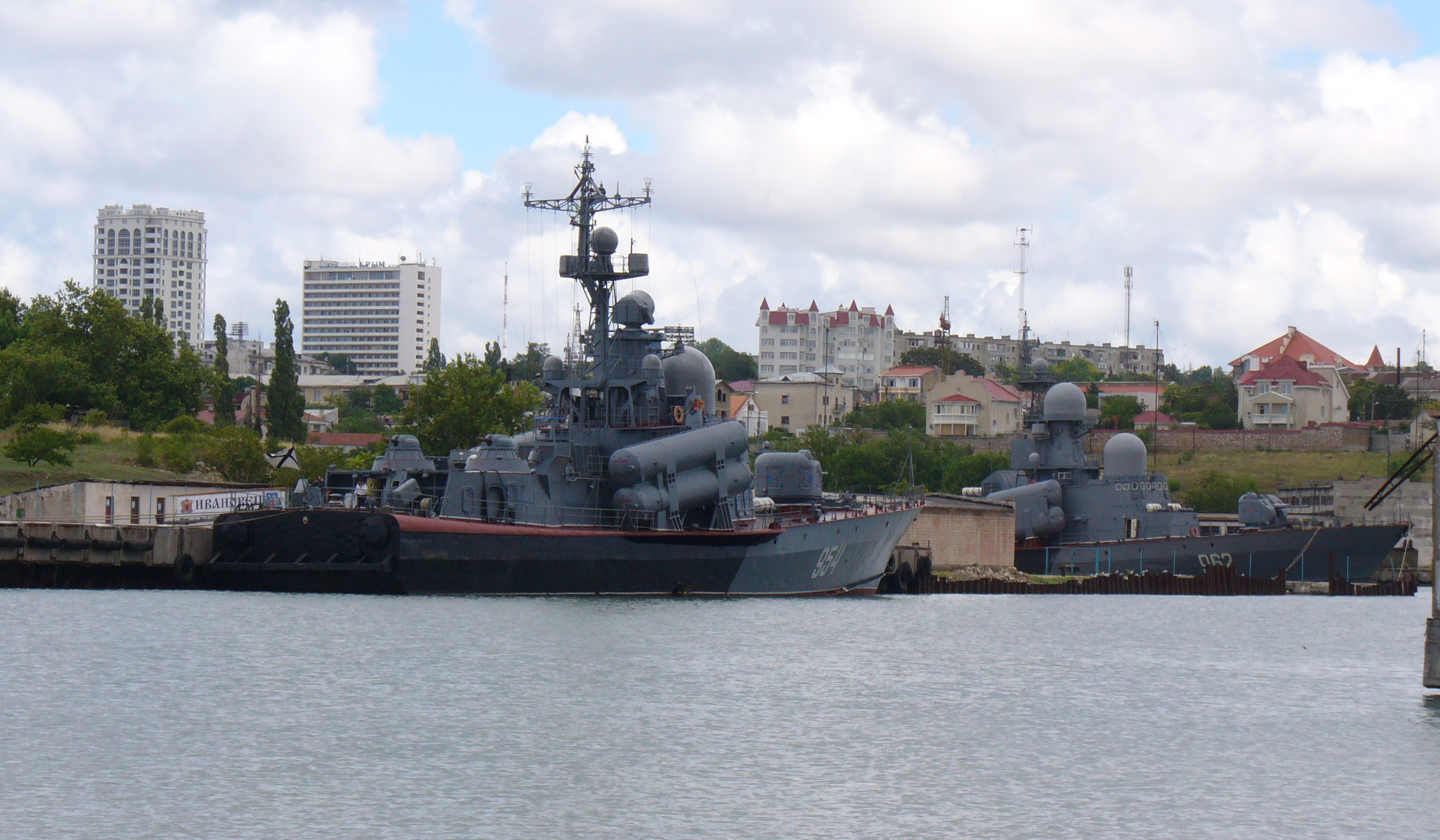
Russian ships in Sevastopol, 2008.

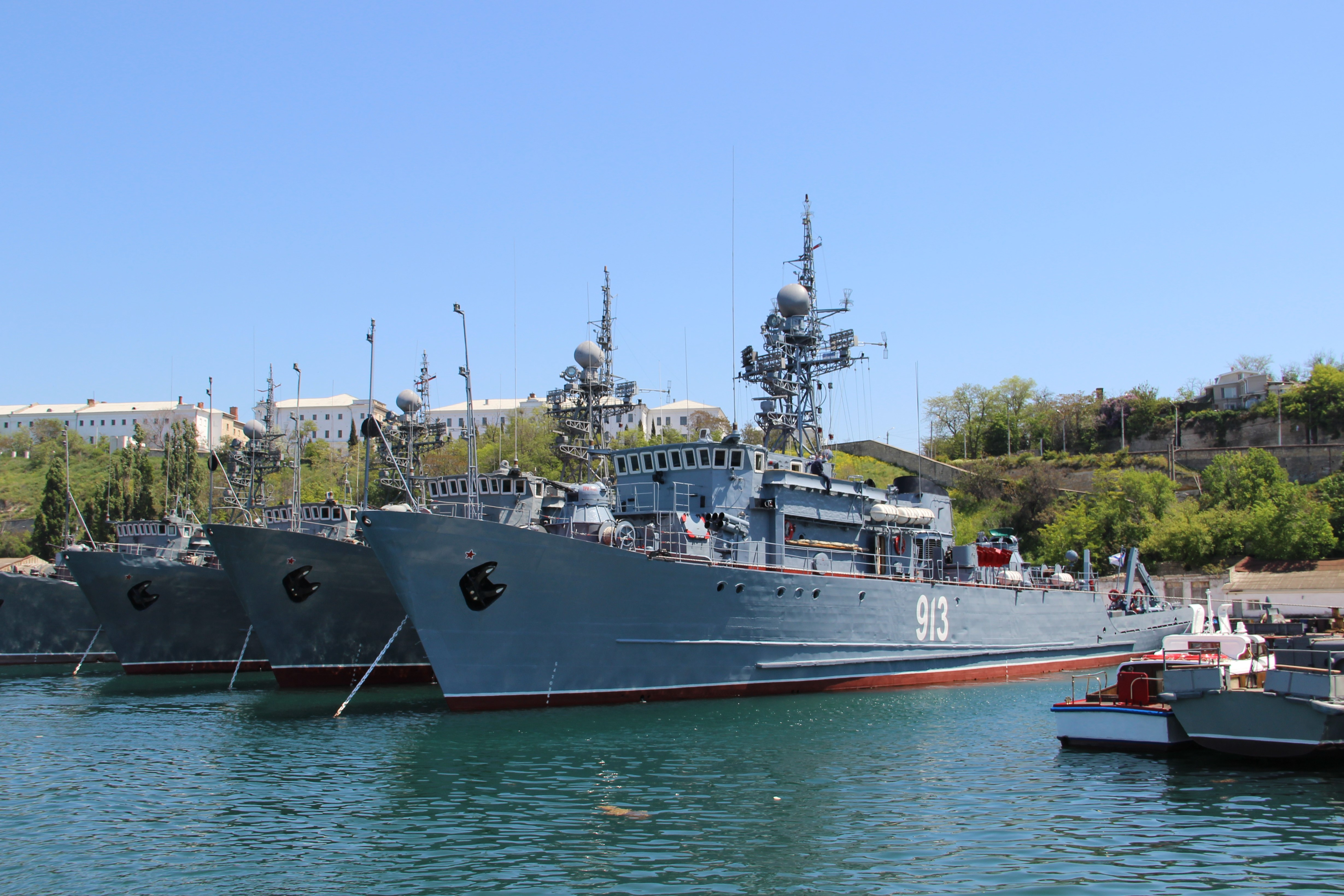
Russian ships in Sevastopol, 2015.

== See also ==
- Naval museum complex Balaklava, former submarine pen 10 km south of Sevastopol in Balaklava Bay
- Sevastopol Radar Station
- List of Russian military bases abroad
