= Heracles Peninsula =

Peninsula in southwestern Crimea

- Peninsula
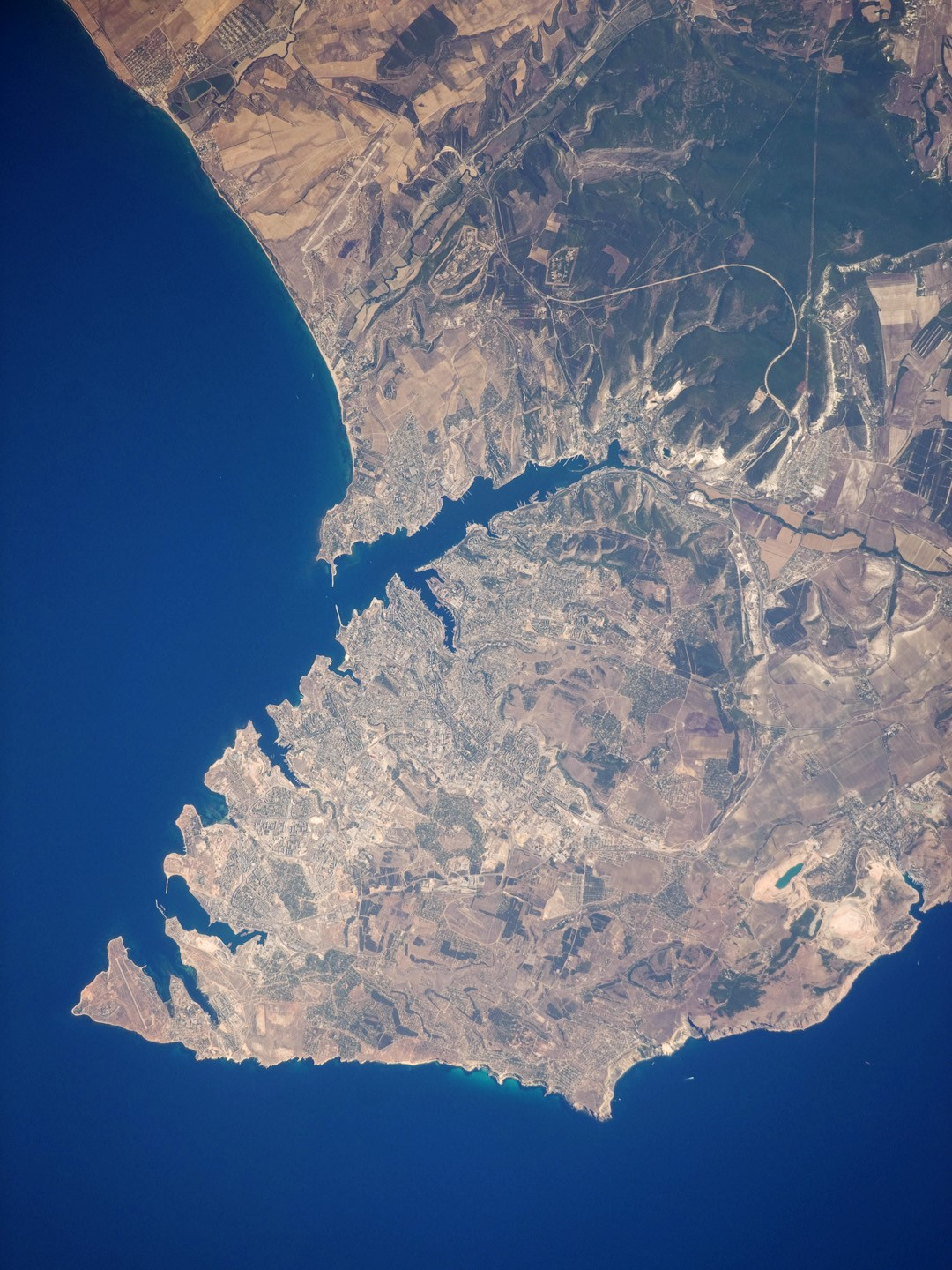
- Image of peninsula from satellite

- Interactive map of Heracles Peninsula
- Coordinates: 44°33′N 33°30′E
- Location: Crimea
- Part of: Crimea

Heracles Peninsula (Ukrainian: Гераклійський півострів, romanized: Herakliiskyi pivostriv; Russian: Гераклейский полуостров, romanized: Gerakleyskiy poluostrov) is a triangular headland in Black Sea at the southwestern portion of Crimea. It is distinguished by its northern edge at the Bay of Sevastopol (continuing by Chorna River) and its eastern edge at the Balaklava Bay (including the Valley of Balaklava). Most of the peninsula is heavily urbanized and occupied by the city of Sevastopol.

The name reminiscent with a divine hero of the Ancient Greece has in fact derived from another ancient Greek city Heraclea Pontica (today Karadeniz Ereğli (Turkish variant)). The Greek colonists founded the ancient city of Chersonesus, the ruins of which to this day may be found in Sevastopol. Other names of the peninsula include Trachea or Irakli. The peninsula was an agricultural district of Chersonesus also known as Chora (Greek: χώρα).

The peninsula represents itself as a rocky plateau (high plain) that is dissected by gulches and gently descends from the Sapun mountain to Black Sea.

== See also ==
- List of peninsulas
