= Nikolai Garin-Mikhailovsky =

Russian writer and engineer

Nikolai Georgievich Garin-Mikhailovsky
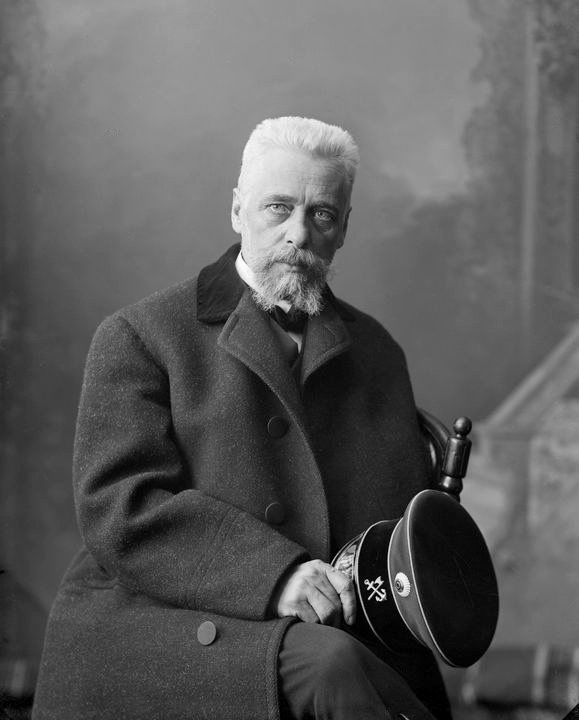
- Born: 20 February 1852; Saint Petersburg, Russian Empire
- Died: 10 December 1906 (aged 54); Saint Petersburg, Russian Empire
- Occupations: writer and essayist, locating engineer and railroad constructor
- Spouses: Nadezhda Valerievna Charykova; Vera Aleksandrovna Sadovskaia

Nikolai Georgievich Mikhailovsky (Russian: Никола́й Гео́ргиевич Михайло́вский, 20 February [O.S. 8 February] 1852 – 10 December [O.S. 27 November] 1906) was a writer and essayist from the Russian Empire. He was also a locating engineer and railroad constructor. As a writer, he published under the pseudonym N. Garin (Russian: Н. Га́рин), and since his death has been commonly referred to as the hyphenated Garin-Mikhailovsky.

== Career ==
As an engineer Garin-Mikhailovsky was involved in construction of the Laspi Pass highway and the Trans-Siberian Railway. In 1891 he headed the surveying party that chose the place for building a railroad bridge over River Ob for the Trans-Siberian Railway. It was Garin-Mikhailovsky who rejected the option of raising a bridge in Tomsk. This decision later resulted in the foundation of Novosibirsk and played a vital role in development of the city.

He came down in the history of Russian literature as the author of the story Tyoma's Childhood (1892) and the short story Several Years in the Country. His travels in the Far East resulted in the travel notes Around Korea, Manchuria and Liaodong Peninsula (1899) and Korean Tales (1899). One of his stories was published in the first volume of Maxim Gorky's Znanie collections in 1904.

His short story Practical Training is available in English translation in The Salt Pit, Raduga Publishers, 1988.

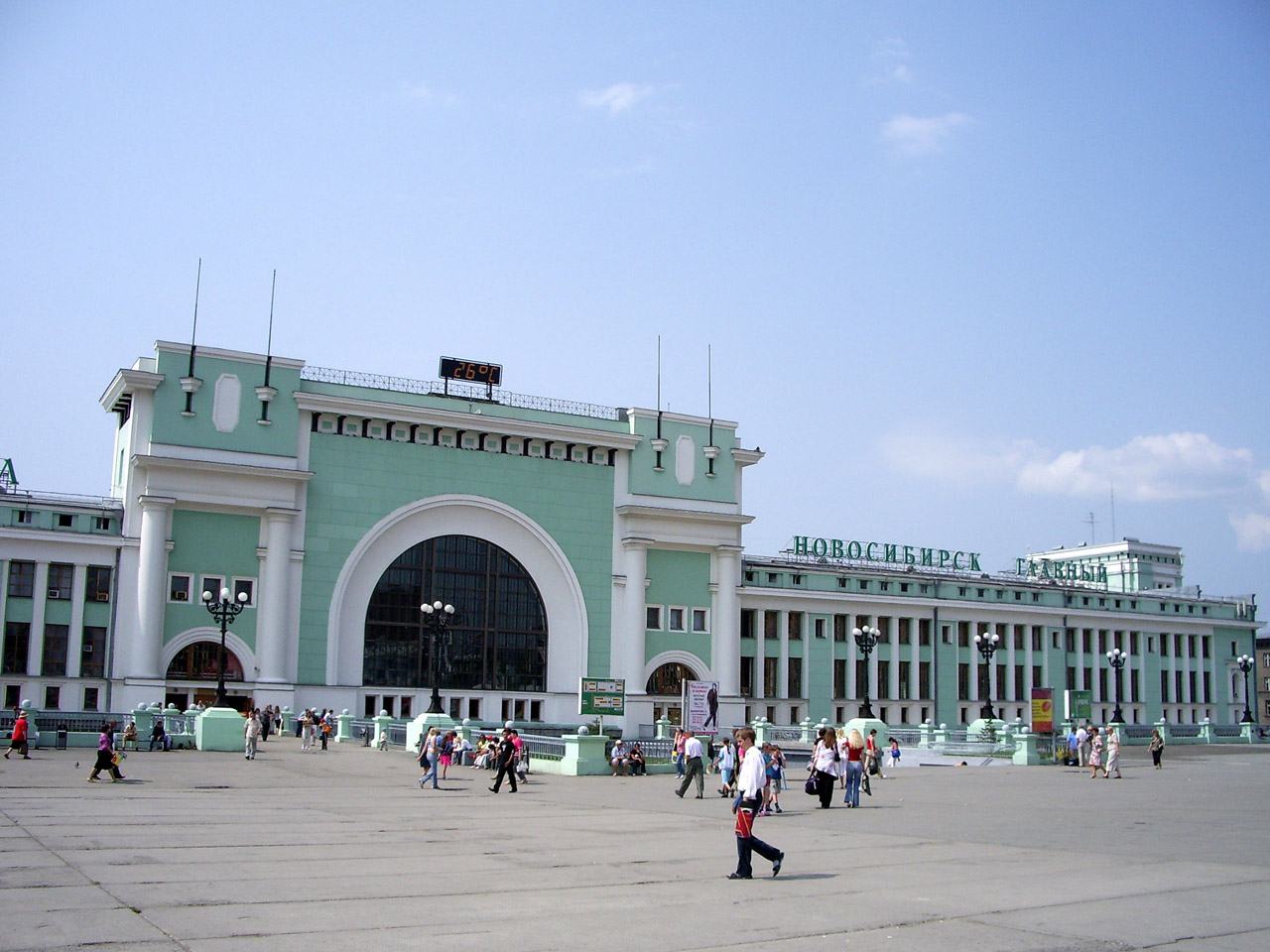
Garin-Mikhailovsky square

== Legacy ==
The public square in front of the Novosibirsk train station is named after him.
