= Foros, Crimea =

Foros Форос
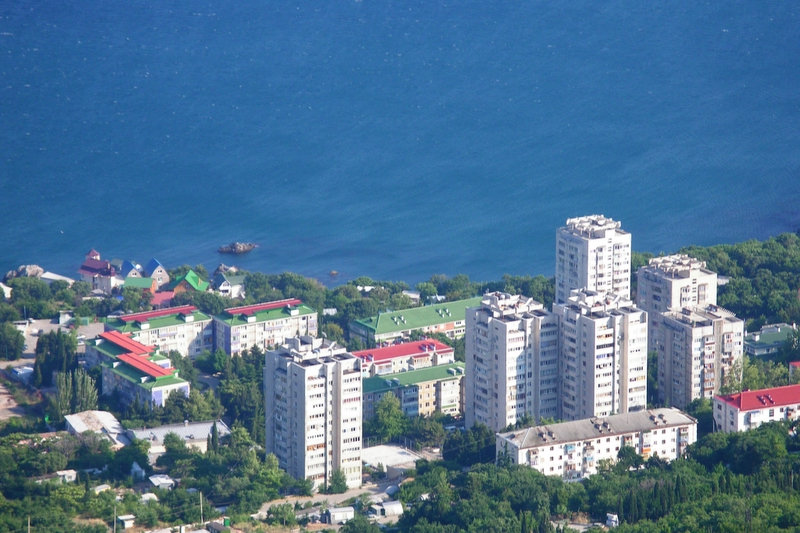

- Flag Coat of arms
- Interactive map of Foros
- Location of Foros within the Crimea Foros (Crimea)
- Coordinates: 44°23′32″N 33°47′9″E
- Republic: Crimea
- Region: Yalta Municipality
- Local council: Foros
- Elevation: 50 m (160 ft)

Population (2014)
  - Total: 1,844
- Time zone: UTC+3 (MSK)
- Postal code: 98690
- Area code: +380-654
- Climate: Cfa / Csa

Foros (Ukrainian: Форос; Russian: Форос; Crimean Tatar: Foros; Greek: Φάρος, romanized: Pháros) is a resort town (legally an urban-type settlement) in the Yalta Municipality of the Autonomous Republic of Crimea, a territory of Ukraine occupied by Russia under the name "Republic of Crimea". According to the most recent census, it had a population of 1,844 (2014 Census).

Foros is the southernmost resort in Crimea and in all of Ukraine.

The settlement was founded and named by medieval Greek merchants. It was rediscovered in the late 19th century by Alexander Kuznetsov, a Russian "tea king" who had his palace built on the sea shore. It was Kuznetsov who commissioned the town's main landmark, the Resurrection Church. This ornate five-domed architectural extravaganza is sited on a 400-metre cliff overlooking Foros.

The Soviet leaders had several state dachas built near Foros. One of these came to international attention during the 1991 Soviet coup d'état attempt, when the Soviet leader Mikhail Gorbachev had been vacationing at the time of the coup. Gorbachev's luxury dacha had been fired upon a couple of times during the capture, after which Gorbachev was placed under house arrest.

== See also ==
- Baydar Gate
- Church of the Resurrection, Foros
