= Foros Church =

Russian Orthodox church in Foros, Crimea

Coordinates: 44°24′16.3″N 33°47′17.9″E

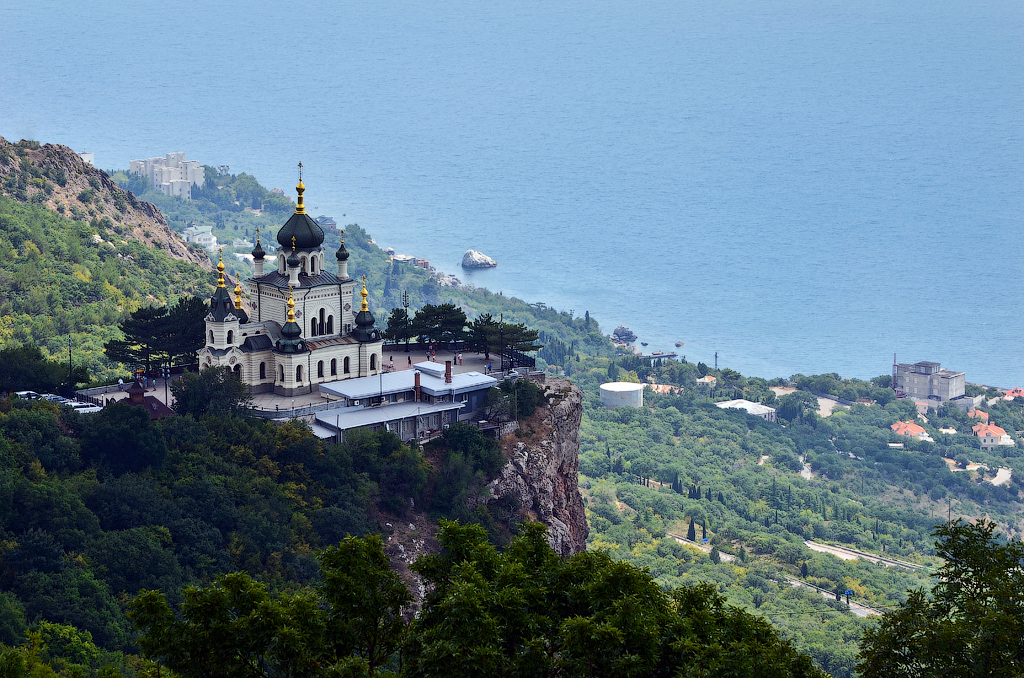
- View on the Red Cliff from the Baydar Gate
- Foros Church
- Denomination: Russian Orthodox Church

Architecture
- Architectural type: Russian Revival architecture

Immovable Monument of National Significance of Ukraine
- Official name: Церква Воскресіння (Resurrection Church)
- Type: Architecture
- Reference no.: 0100119

The Church of Christ's Resurrection (Russian: Воскресенская церковь, romanized: Voskryesyenskaya tserkov'; Ukrainian: Церква Воскресіння Христового, romanized: Tserkva Voskresinnia Khrystovoho) is a popular tourist attraction close to the southernmost tip of the Crimea, known primarily for its scenic location, overlooking the Black Sea littoral from a 400-metre cliff near Baidarsky Pass.

== History ==
The church overlooking the village of Foros was commissioned by a local landowner to commemorate Alexander III's survival in the Borki train disaster (1888). The landowner's name was Alexander Kuznetsov; he was a tea trader from Moscow. Nikolai Chagin, a celebrated architect from Vilnius, designed the church in an unusual blend of Rastrelliesque Baroque, Russian Revival, and Byzantine Revival.

The church was consecrated on 4 October 1892 in the name of the Resurrection of Christ in a ceremony attended by Konstantin Pobedonostsev. The last Tsar, Nicholas II of Russia, and his wife prayed at the church on the day of the 10th anniversary of the Borki incident.

After the Russian Revolution the church was closed for worshippers, its priest exiled to Siberia and frescoes painted over. The building was used as a snackbar for tourists until 1969 and stood empty throughout the 1970s and 1980s. It was returned to the Orthodox Church and went through four restoration campaigns under the auspices of Leonid Kuchma.

The Foros Church is a popular wedding location. In July 2003 Metropolitan Volodymyr Sabodan wed politician Viktor Medvedchuk and TV host Oksana Marchenko in the Foros church. Anastasia Zavorotnyuk and Peter Tchernyshev also chose to be married here.

== Gallery ==
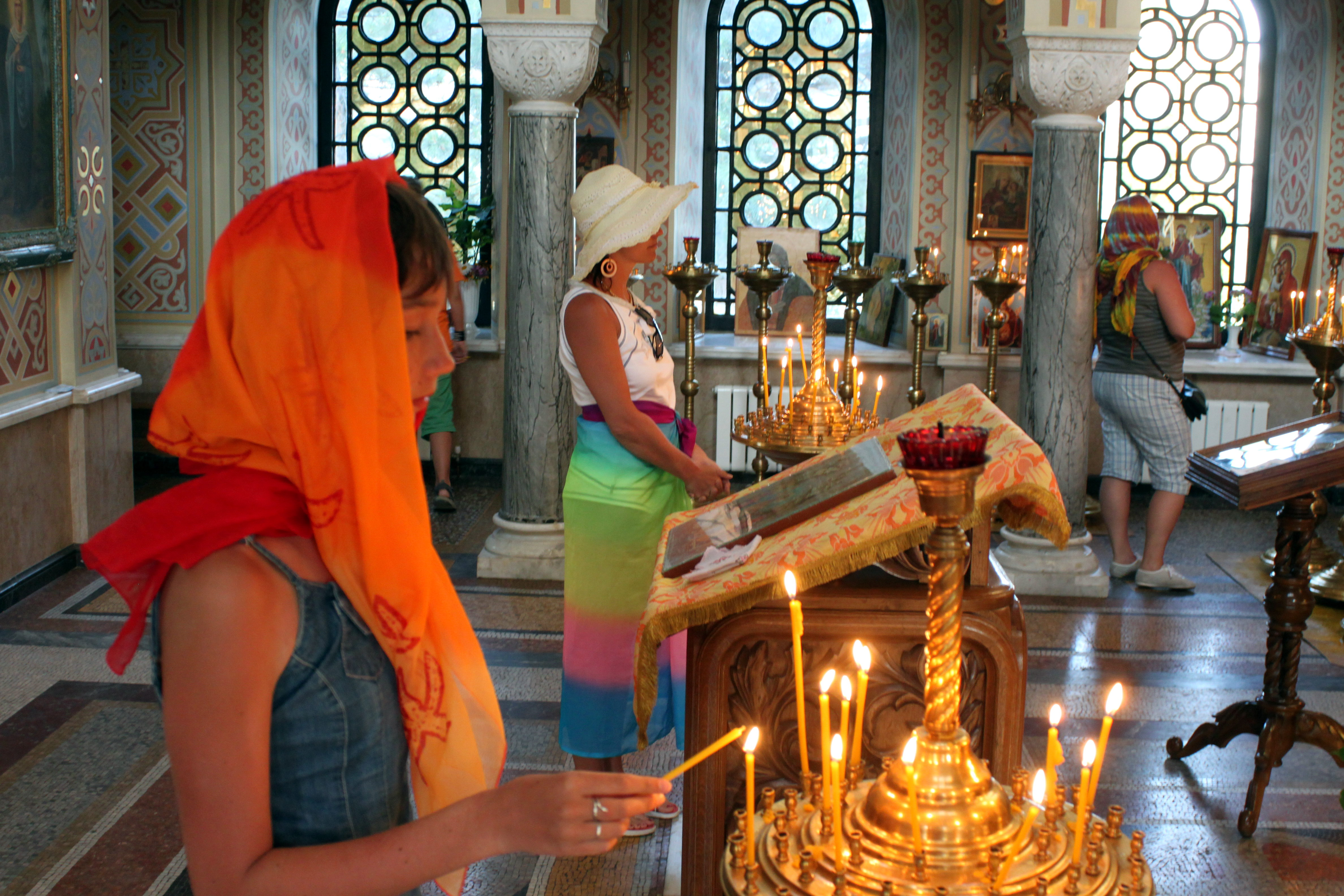
Interior

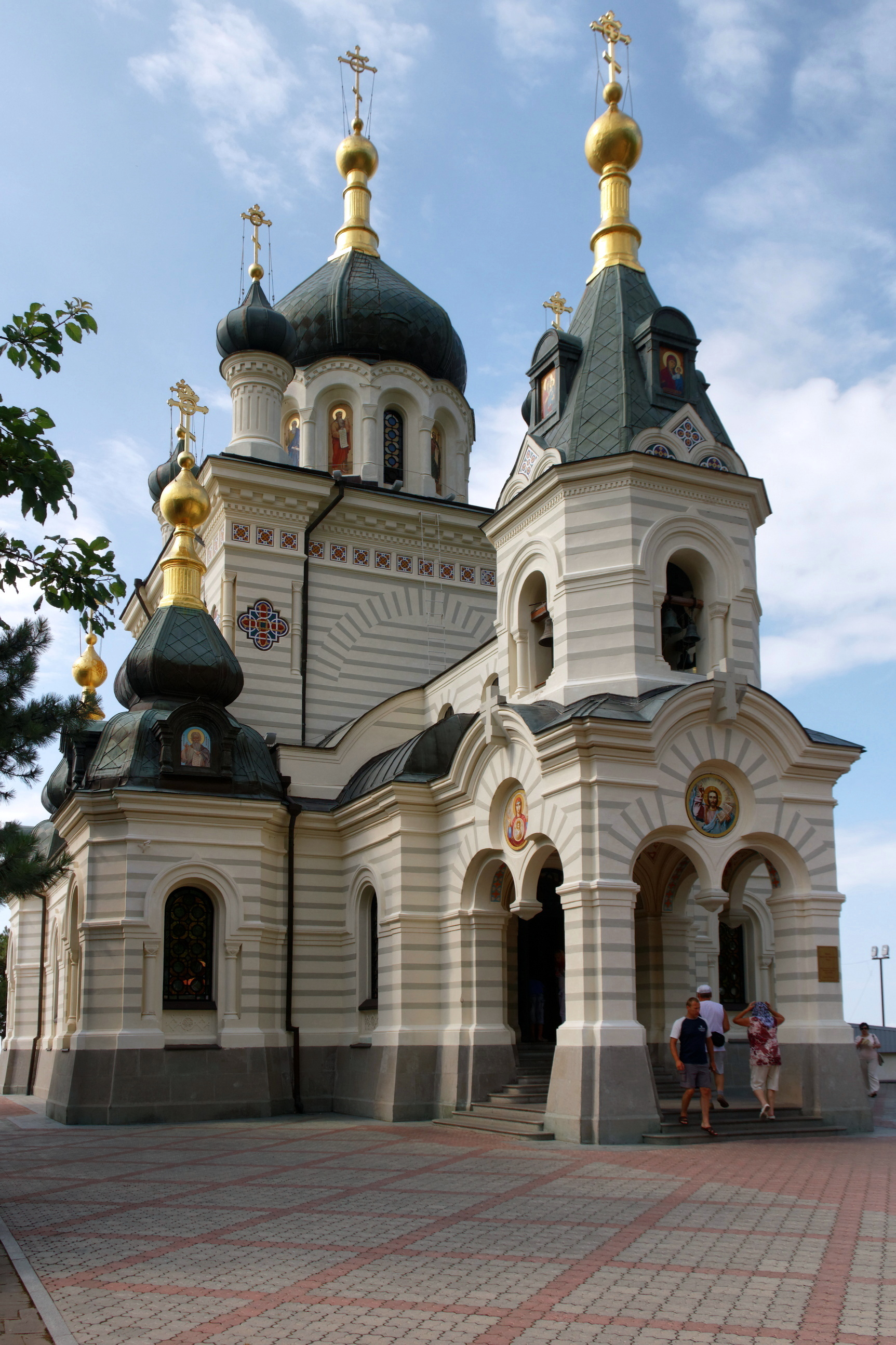
The porch/bell tower

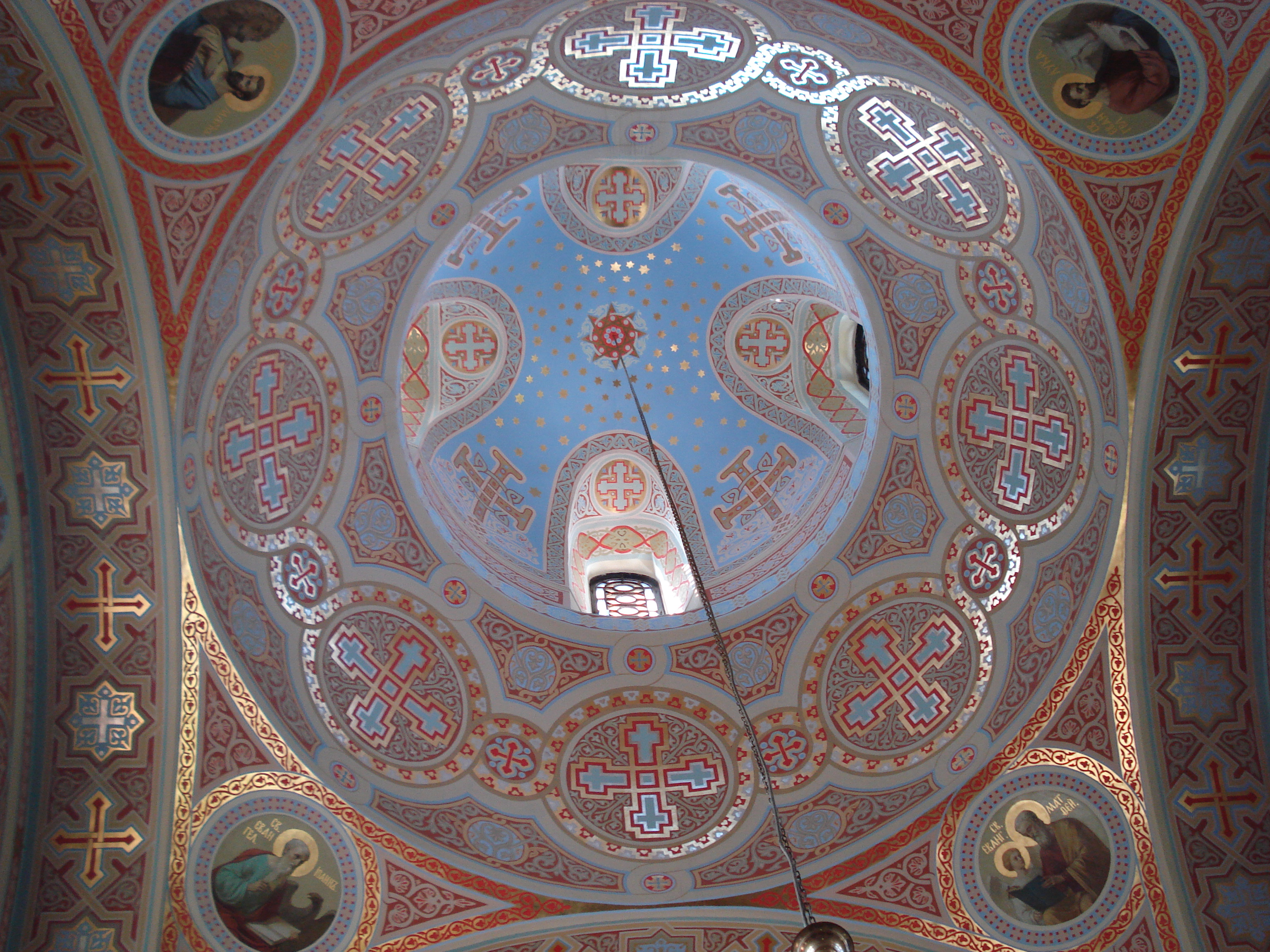
The dome
