= Kharkiv Pact =

2010 treaty between Ukraine and Russia

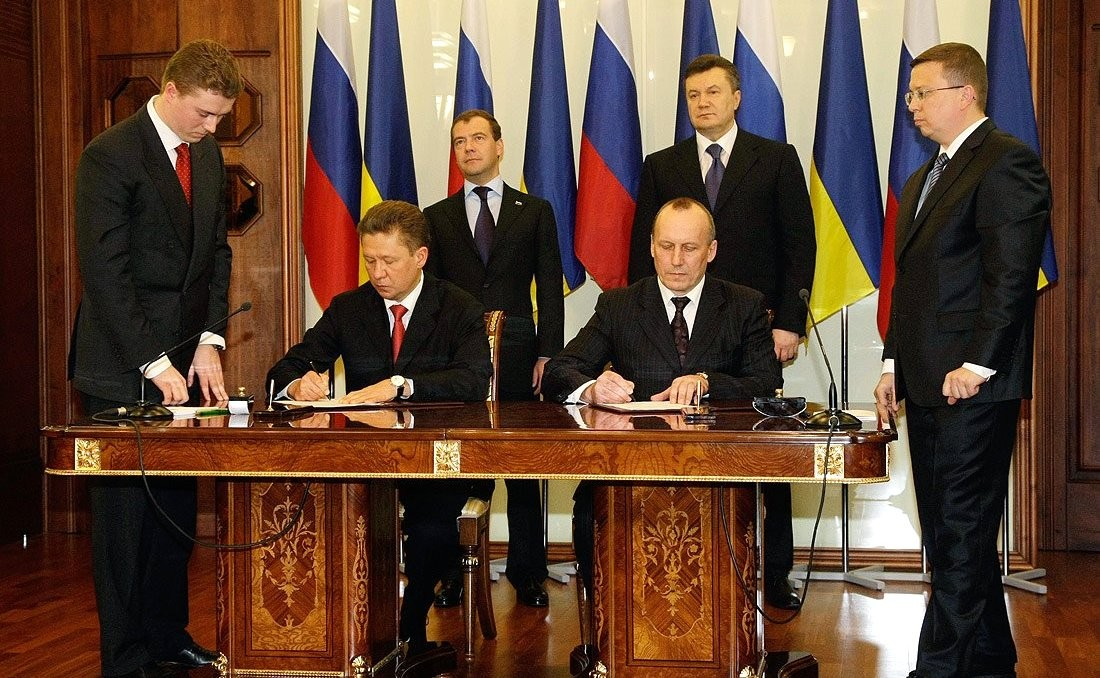
- Signing of the deal reached at the Kharkiv summit at 21 April 2010 by Alexey Miller and Yevhen Bakulin (with Dimitry Medvedev and Viktor Yanukovych standing in the background)
- Signed: 21 April 2010
- Location: Kharkiv, Ukraine
- Effective: 27 April 2010
- Expiration: 31 March 2014
- Parties: Russia; Ukraine
- Languages: Russian; Ukrainian

The Agreement between Ukraine and Russia on the Black Sea Fleet in Ukraine, widely referred to as the Kharkiv Pact (Ukrainian: Харківський пакт) or Kharkov Accords (Russian: Харьковские соглашения), was a treaty between Ukraine and Russia whereby the Russian lease on naval facilities in Crimea was extended beyond 2017 until 2042, with an additional five-year renewal option in exchange for a multiyear discounted contract to provide Ukraine with Russian natural gas.

The agreement, signed on 21 April 2010 in Kharkiv, Ukraine, by Ukrainian president Viktor Yanukovych and Russian president Dmitry Medvedev and ratified by the parliaments of the two countries on 27 April 2010, aroused much controversy in Ukraine. The treaty was effectively a continuation of the lease provisions that were part of the 1997 Black Sea Fleet Partition Treaty between the two states. Shortly after the annexation of Crimea by the Russian Federation in March 2014, Russia unilaterally terminated the treaty on 31 March 2014.

== History ==
In 1997, Russia and Ukraine agreed to end the dispute over the former Soviet Black Sea Fleet by signing the Partition Treaty, establishing two independent national fleets and dividing armaments and bases between them. Ukraine also agreed to lease major parts of its new bases in Sevastopol to the Russian Black Sea Fleet until 2017. During the presidency of Victor Yushchenko (January 2005 – February 2010) the Ukrainian government declared that the lease would not be extended and that the fleet would have to leave Sevastopol by 2017.

== Extension of the original lease ==
Russia and Ukraine agreed to extend Russia’s lease of the Sevastopol naval base as part of an energy deal, under which Russia offered Ukraine discounted natural gas in exchange for the longer lease. The Prime Minister of Ukraine, Mykola Azarov, and the Energy Minister, Yuriy Boyko, visited Moscow in late March 2010 to negotiate lower gas prices. On 21 April 2010, Russian president Dmitry Medvedev and Ukrainian President Viktor Yanukovych signed an agreement in which Russia agreed to a 30% drop in the price of natural gas sold to Ukraine. Russia agreed to this in exchange for permission to extend Russia's lease of a major naval base in the Ukrainian Black Sea port of Sevastopol for an additional 25 years (to 2042) with an option for a further 5-year renewal (to 2047).

== Ratification and voting ==
Riots at the Verkhovna Rada during voting on 27 April 2010

The agreement was subject to approval by both the Russian and Ukrainian parliaments. Both parliaments ratified the agreement on 27 April 2010. Ratification in the Ukrainian parliament proved controversial, and several disturbances occurred during the process.

=== Voting ===
During a contentious voting session, half of the deputies (legislators) belonging to the ruling Party of Regions (PR) were out of their seats blocking the podium. 160 members of PR, including Rinat Akhmetov, who was not present in the session hall voted in favor of ratification. Among the opposition parties, the ratification was approved by nine members of BYuT and seven from Our Ukraine. All 27 members of the Communist Party of Ukraine and the 20 members of the Lytvyn Bloc voted for the Kharkiv Pact as well. Of those who did not belong to a faction, only Taras Chornovil, Oleksandr Fomin, and Ihor Rybakov did not support the agreement.

Results

Faction	Number of deputies	For	Against	Abstained	Did not vote	Absent
Party of Regions Faction	161	160	0	0	1	0
Yulia Tymoshenko Bloc	154	9	0	0	0	145
Our Ukraine–People's Self-Defense Bloc	72	7	0	0	0	65
Communist Party of Ukraine Faction	27	27	0	0	0	0
Lytvyn Bloc	20	20	0	0	0	0
No faction affiliated	16	13	0	0	1	2
All factions	450	236	0	0	2	212

== Termination of the treaty by Russia ==
On 28 March 2014, one week after the annexation of Crimea by Russia Russian president Vladimir Putin submitted proposals to the State Duma on the termination of the legal effect of a number of Russian-Ukrainian agreements, including the 2010 Kharkiv Pact treaty and the Partition Treaty on the Status and Conditions of the Black Sea Fleet. The State Duma unanimously approved the unilateral dissolution of these Russian-Ukrainian agreements with 433 members of parliament voting on 31 March 2014.

== Criticism ==
Taras Kuzio, a British expert on Ukrainian politics, criticized the treaty. He stated that the bill was forced through Ukraine's legislature without parliamentary debate or public discourse, and after ignoring votes against it within three important committees (two of which had negative majorities). He argued that the treaty violates the constitution, which bans permanent military bases, and that it was not discussed prior to a vote in the National Security and Defense Council as required by the constitution. Kuzio said that the treaty is illegitimate because it rests on only 220 deputies from three factions; he argued that the remaining twenty-five deputies had been blackmailed, bribed or coerced to defect from the opposition. He added that Ukrainian public support was "gained by a lie" that the deal would bring cheaper Russian gas; while in fact, a new July 2010 agreement with the IMF mandated that Ukraine increase utility prices by fifty per cent on 1 August 2010 and another fifty per cent in April 2011.

According to former Ukrainian prime minister Yulia Tymoshenko, the agreement violates part of Ukraine's constitution, which forbids the country from hosting foreign military bases after 2017. The chairman of the Ukrainian Constitutional Court said on 23 April that only the president and the Cabinet of Ministers can request a court ruling on constitutionality. The Our Ukraine party subsequently called for the impeachment of President Yanukovych for violating the Ukrainian Constitution.

Opposition members in Ukraine and Russia expressed doubts that the agreement would be fulfilled by Ukraine's side. According to Yanukovych, the only way out of holding the state budget deficit down, as requested by the International Monetary Fund, while protecting pensioners and minimal wages, was to extend the Russian Navy lease in Crimea in exchange for cheaper natural gas. Opposition members in Ukraine described the agreement as a "sell out of national interests".

Boris Nemtsov, former leader of the Union of Right Forces, said that Russia needed the Black Sea fleet in Crimea for war with Georgia and asked rhetorically if war with Georgia was worth $40 billion.

== Effects ==
The treaty allowed Russia to station a limited number of troops in Crimea, 25,000 maximum.

=== Criminal cases against Yanukovych and ministers ===
In summer of 2014, the General Prosecutor of Ukraine opened a criminal case against Viktor Yanukovych on several charges following an investigation into the former president's signing of the Kharkiv Accords.

In July 2022, Ukrainian law enforcement stated that former foreign minister Konstiantyn Hryshchenko and former Justice Minister Oleksandr Lavrynovych were under suspicion of high treason for signing the agreement. The suspicions were filed in absentia, as the two were "hiding abroad".
