= Black Sea Fleet dispute =

1992–1997 Russian-Ukrainian dispute

- Part of the Dissolution of the Soviet Union
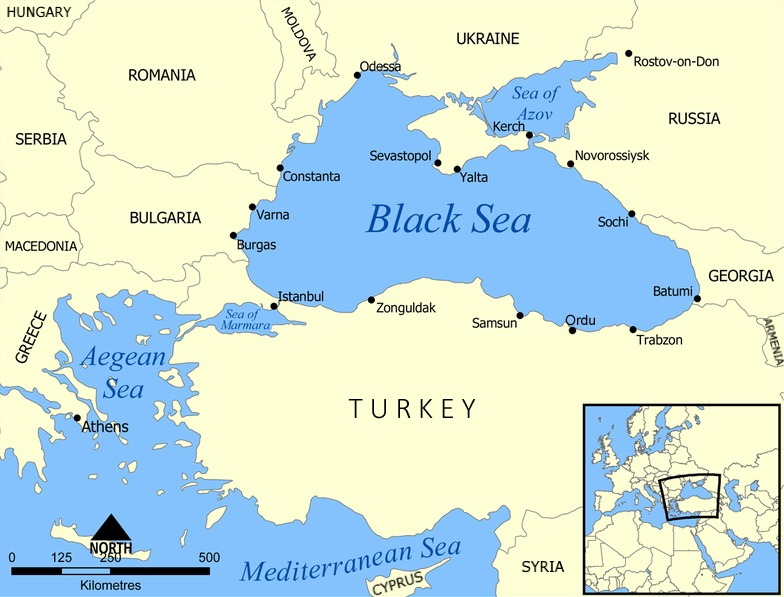
- Black Sea
- Date: 4 January 1992 – 28 May 1997
- Location: Crimea, Odesa, Black Sea
- Result: Division of Black Sea Fleet between Russia and Ukraine; Leasing of Sevastopol naval bases to Russia for 20 years; Crimea with Sevastopol acknowledged as part of Ukraine

Parties
Ukraine	Russia

Lead figures
(Ukraine) Leonid Kravchuk (Ukraine) Leonid Kuchma (Ukraine) Pavlo Lazarenko	(Russia) Boris Yeltsin (Russia) Viktor Chernomyrdin

The Black Sea Fleet dispute took place between Russia and Ukraine following the dissolution of the Soviet Union. The dispute revolved around ownership of the former Soviet Black Sea Fleet, basing rights in Sevastopol, the home base of the fleet, and sovereignty over Crimea. The dispute began in 1992 and involved a series of negotiations and maritime incidents, before being finally settled in 1997 through the Partition Treaty on the Status and Conditions of the Black Sea Fleet.

== Background ==
In 1991, following the dissolution of the Soviet Union, Ukraine and Russia emerged as sovereign nations. The dissolution kicked off the process of dividing former Soviet assets between the newly established republics. Along with the ownership of nuclear weapons located in Ukraine, the ownership of the Black Sea Fleet emerged as one of the most contentious issues. Moreover, with the fleet's home base being located in Sevastopol, the question of who would retain the basing rights there also remained open. Finally, the issue of sovereignty over the entire Crimean Peninsula also surfaced, with the peninsula having 78% ethnic Russian population, although it was turned over from the Russian SFSR to the Ukrainian SSR on 5 February 1954 by the Soviet leader Nikita Khrushchev to mark the 300th anniversary of the 1654 Pereiaslav Agreement, which led to the incorporation of the Trans-Dnepr Ukraine into Russia.

Having emerged as an independent nation, the dispute over Black Sea Fleet ownership was more of an issue of strengthening this newly acquired sovereignty for Ukraine rather than that of acquiring an entirely new fleet as Ukraine could not afford its maintenance costs. More principal issues than ownership of the vessels were the basing rights in Sevastopol and sovereignty over Crimea, which Ukraine sought to maintain. For Russia, the principal issue was to acquire the ships and the basing rights, which was preferred to be on a sovereign territory of Russia. It was of symbolic importance for Russia, in order to project its power on its southern flank in relation to Turkey, the Caucasus and the future Caspian oil flows. Russia sought to establish a powerful presence in the region.

The Black Sea Fleet was established in 1783 by Russian empress Catherine the Great. The estimates of the number of ships in the Black Sea Fleet varied, with different estimates ranging from 300 to 635. Many of these ships were described as aging. The Black Sea Fleet, according to the think tank International Institute for Strategic Studies, numbered some 45 surface warships, 28 submarines and 300 other vessels, plus 151 combat fixed-wing aircraft and 85 helicopters. The ships have been described as "prestigious but rotting". The fleet had 70,000 sailors, of whom 30 percent were Ukrainians.

The Russian-led Commonwealth of Independent States (CIS) was founded by the ex-Soviet republics, including Ukraine and Russia, in place of the Soviet Union in December 1991, and on 30 December agreements were signed in Minsk allowing each republic to have its own army, while "strategic forces" were to be under CIS command. As Ukraine moved closer towards creating its own military, it led to the issue of ownership of Black Sea Fleet surfacing in the relations of two countries.

== Overview ==
The dispute involved protracted negotiations over the fleet, with there being different stages in the negotiations. The dispute over the Black Sea Fleet ships took precedence during an early stage. The central point during the very beginning of talks was whether the fleet would be divided at all or placed under joint CIS command. After reaching an agreement on splitting the fleet, the issue of the allocation of bases surfaced and became the most contentious one, which led to even wider dispute of the sovereignty over Crimea. The issue of basing rights dominated the negotiations in 1993–1997.

During the first two years after Soviet dissolution, the issue was discussed concurrently with Ukrainian nuclear arsenal issue, with the two negotiations affecting each other, although later it was decided that the consensus would never be achieved if one issue continued to influence the other one.

The discussions over the ownership of Black Sea Fleet created tensions not only between Russia and Ukraine, but within these states themselves, particularly between executives, legislatures and strong interest groups, such as armed forces, which often voiced differing opinions.

== Basis of claims ==
The arguments regarding the ownership of the Black Sea Fleet often revolved around different and competing interpretations of the laws and international treaties. Ukraine based its claim of ownership on territoriality. It alluded to the Ukrainian Supreme Soviet law passed on 10 September 1991, which nationalized former Soviet property and financial assets on Ukraine's territory, and another law passed in December 1991 which subordinated all military formations on Ukrainian territory to Ukraine. The Ukrinform issued a statement in April 1992, saying "Ukraine's position at the negotiations... on the issue of the Black Sea Fleet will be built on the right of every state to inherit the property located on its territory".

The military structures of Commonwealth of Independent States (CIS), backed by Russian government, voiced their own claim that the fleet was the property of CIS based on the Minsk agreement. They alluded to the fleet's claimed classification as "strategic force", arguing that the fleet was part of "strategic forces" due to half of its ships being capable of carrying strategic nuclear weapons. They said that because of this the fleet should be placed under the joint CIS command according to the Minsk agreement. The claim was also supported by Black Sea Fleet commander Vladimir Kasatonov, who also argued against any possible division of fleet between the countries, saying "dismembering the fleet would be like dismembering living flesh". However, President of Ukraine Leonid Kravchuk argued against these claims and said that they were based on too broad interpretation of the word "strategic". Kravchuk asserted that after removing strategic nuclear weapons from the fleet's nuclear-capable ships, these ships and the fleet as a whole could not be considered as strategic anymore and that the territoriality would require the fleet's transfer to Ukraine. Ukraine voiced an immediate claim on all of "non-strategic" ships and also on the rest after removing and destroying "strategic" nuclear weapons from them.

Kasatonov further argued against Ukrainian ownership by telling the Ukrainian officials: "You cannot privatize the armed forces and history". He claimed that the fleet as a whole had a "strategic" significance due its ability to project power in the Mediterranean Sea, as it was challenging the United States Sixth Fleet. Therefore, he argued for the fleet to be placed under CIS command per Minsk agreement. Thus, additionally to the fleet including nuclear-capable vessels, its strategic value was also ascribed to it projecting the power through the Mediterranean Sea, and challenging the United States Sixth Fleet and Turkish navy.

The view that the fleet was CIS property was initially shared by Russian president Boris Yeltsin and Defence Minister Pavel Grachev, and was also supported by Crimean president Yuri Meshkov in 1994, who said that the issue of Black Sea Fleet ownership should be resolved based on interests of all CIS states, along with the wishes of Crimean population and authorities. Commander of CIS Armed Forces Yevgeny Shaposhnikov claimed that the fleet should be divided not just between Russia and Ukraine, but between all CIS member states. The most active supporters of the CIS ownership were the CIS command and the Black Sea Fleet's officers. Feliks Gromov, first deputy commander of the fleet, argued that it should be under CIS command so it could maintain an ability to coordinate with the Baltic and Northern fleets. Ukraine opposed the CIS ownership by saying that the navy can not be interstate and that it needs to be answerable to a particular state, which it claimed would be Russia in case of CIS ownership.

Besides CIS ownership, Russia additionally also claimed its own ownership right over the Black Sea Fleet. Russia's claim was based on it being a successor to the USSR and its legal heir. Russian president Boris Yeltsin, while initially claiming that the entire fleet was Russian in early January 1992, stepped back from this position by mid-January and claimed CIS ownership. In April, while still reiterating his claim of CIS command over the Black Sea Fleet, Yeltsin also moved to establish Russia's own navy, army and air force, saying that the idea of unified CIS armed forces failed to materialize. After it was decided to divide the fleet between Ukraine and Russia and to place it under their temporary interstate joint command by August 1992, the line of argument supporting CIS ownership lost its relevance and Russia's main claim began to revolve around its own right to ownership over the fleet.

Both Russia and Ukraine often based their claims on the fleet on financial arguments. In April 1994, the Ukrainian ambassador to Moscow said that Ukraine could claim 16% of the whole Soviet navy, which was more than the Black Sea Fleet, based on its assumption of 16.4% of the USSR's debt. Anton Buteyko, the foreign affairs advisor to the Ukrainian President, said that Ukraine could claim 20 to 25 percent based on its supposed contribution to the building and maintaining the Soviet navy. Additionally, both sides used the claimed funding of the fleet during the dispute itself to justify their ownership claims over the BSF. As such, Boris Yeltsin's decree on claiming the ownership over the fleet in April 1992 asserted as one of the reasons for the fleet being Russian the fact that "the activities of the BSF are financed out of the Russian Federation budget".

At the same time, both sides made statements connecting the Black Sea Fleet to their national identities, invoking historical traditions. Ukrainian president Leonid Kravchuk linked the Black Sea Fleet to the Cossack exploration of the Black Sea while speaking on Zaporozhian Cossacks and their fleet's activities in the Black Sea. On the other hand, Russian officer Vladimir Chernavin said that the Black Sea Fleet "has always been Russian, as we know from history", while Kasatanov linked its creation to the Russian Empire and the Soviet Union.

== History ==
=== The beginning of dispute ===
The issue of the ownership of Black Sea Fleet was raised first in January 1992, following the dissolution of the Soviet Union. Viktor Antonov, Ukrainian minister of state for defense affairs, and Kostyantyn Morozov, defence minister of Ukraine, stated in January 1992 that the Black Sea Fleet was always part of Ukraine and would remain to be so. As Ukraine moved to create its own military after Minsk agreement, Ukraine announced its control over Soviet army and naval units on its territory and on 4 January ordered servicemen to swear allegiance to Ukraine or return to their homelands. In response, thousands demonstrated in Sevastopol against Ukraine taking over military bases and the Black Sea Fleet. President of Russia Boris Yeltsin voiced his opposition to Ukraine's control of Black Sea Fleet, and called servicemen not to swear oath. On 9 January, Yeltsin said: "The Black Sea Fleet was, is and will remain Russia's". Black Sea fleet commander Admiral Vladimir Kasatonov spoke in favor of placing the fleet under the CIS command, which was backed by the Russian government. As the Minsk agreement co-signed by Ukraine and Russia required the "strategic forces" to be placed under CIS command, Ukrainian and Russian officials argued over to what extent did the definition of "strategic forces" apply to the Black Sea Fleet. Ukraine said that it would transfer to CIS command only heavy surface ships and nuclear-carrying submarines. Kasatonov, on the other hand, dismissed the idea of splitting the fleet into strategic and non-strategic elements as "absurd" and argued that the entire fleet should be transferred to the CIS command. Russia was willing to compromise only by giving some "non-strategic" light ships, including coastal patrol boats, as well as antisubmarine aircraft to Ukraine, considering all the rest of the ships as "strategic" ones to be given to the CIS. At the same time, the issue of Crimea has also flared up, with the Black Sea Fleet admirals calling Russia to retake Crimea and describing its transfer to Ukraine in 1954 as "illegal" in a letter to Ukrainian president Leonid Kravchuk according Rossiskaya Gazeta, the official paper of the Russian Parliament.

On 12 January, the Russian and Ukrainian negotiators met in Kyiv and pledged to avoid unilateral actions to defuse tensions. The "contest for the loyalties" ensued, with some sailors and officers swearing loyalty to Ukraine, while others to the CIS, which was administrated by Kasatonov. The situation eventually developed into the stalemate, with no progress being achieved at the CIS summit in March 1992. As the negotiations stalled, on 7 April, Kravchued decreed the beginning of formation of organs to manage Ukraine's own navy on the basis on Black Sea Fleet. Kravchuk also reaffirmed Ukraine's commitment to joint Commonwealth operating control over nuclear weapons. Ukraine claimed that it had the right to inherit a share of the former Soviet navy based on its "substantial contribution to the building of the Baltic, Northern Pacific and Black Sea fleets of the former Soviet Union". Boris Yeltsin countered by adopting his own decree on placing the Black Sea Fleet under Russia's jurisdiction and ordering its ships to raise the St. Andrews flag, an old symbol of Russian navy. Amid rumors that Ukrainian militias would take over Black Sea Fleet installations, the Russian fleet commanders ordered the military police backed by APCs to patrol bases in Sevastopol. Dmytro Pavlychko, the head of the Ukrainian parliamentary commission on foreign affairs, said, "If we look at this in formal terms, Yeltsin's decree puts Ukraine in a state of war with Russia. The fleet is Ukrainian property". However, further tensions were averted as a result of two telephone calls between Kravchuk and Yeltsin, with both of them agreeing to suspend their decrees and to set up commission for the purpose of dividing fleet.

=== Dagomys and Yalta agreements ===
The negotiations began in Odessa on 29–30 April 1992. At the table, Russian delegation emphasized that the issue of Black Sea fleet should be viewed primarily through the lenses of Black Sea Fleet personnel and their rights. A memorandum was signed to ward from unilateral actions aggravating tensions and a joint commission was established after the negotiations. Russian president Boris Yeltsin and Ukrainian president Leonid Kravchuk held Russian-Ukrainian summit in Dagomys on 23 June, where they partially resolved their dispute over Black Sea Fleet, agreeing on sharing the bases in Crimea and on division of Black Sea Fleet, while postponing talks on how to apportion the naval assets in the fleet. 18-point Dagomys agreement also included agreements on introduction of hryvnia as Ukraine's new currency in exchange for shifting to world prices in bilateral Russian-Ukrainian trade. The sides pledged to "work in concert to resolve violent conflicts in the region" and agreed on a joint Russian-Ukrainian conference on Transnistria conflict. The sides failed to reach an agreement on the control of nuclear weapons in Ukraine. Russia and Ukraine signed a general agreement on friendly ties and agreed to start negotiations on a new political treaty to confirm this relationship.

However, the tensions flared up soon on 22 July 1992, when the Black Sea Fleet coast guard frigate armed with torpedoes, two cannons and depth charges raised the Ukrainian flag and headed from a training exercise in Donuzlav to Odessa without permission. The sailors, who had already taken an oath of allegiance to Ukraine, claimed oppression and humiliation by senior Russian officers. The Black Sea Fleet sent guided missile cruisers, hydrofoil, three other ships and a plane to pursue the frigate. Russian vice-president Alexander Rutskoi called the incident "a mutiny", although Ukraine said that they would keep the ship and would not bring charges against sailors, which led to the Black Sea Fleet accusing Ukraine of "piracy". During an emergency meeting between Russian and Ukrainian officials, they agreed to set up a commission to prevent such incidents in the future. The incident derailed the negotiations. To get them back on track, several meetings were held in Sevastopol, during which Ukraine rejected Russia's offers of an 80:20 and 60:40 split in favor of Russia.

On 3 August 1992, Kravchuk and Yeltsin signed an agreement in Mukhalatka (near Yalta) to place the Black Sea Fleet under joint Russo-Ukrainian command for three years before its division, removing it from CIS command. They agreed to jointly appointment of commanders of the fleet and to split the fleet into separate Russian and Ukrainian fleets in 1995. The joint fleet would use the Sevastopol base as its headquarters. The sides did not agree on specifics of how the fleet would be divided. They also agreed on joint funding of the fleet.

=== Rising tensions ===
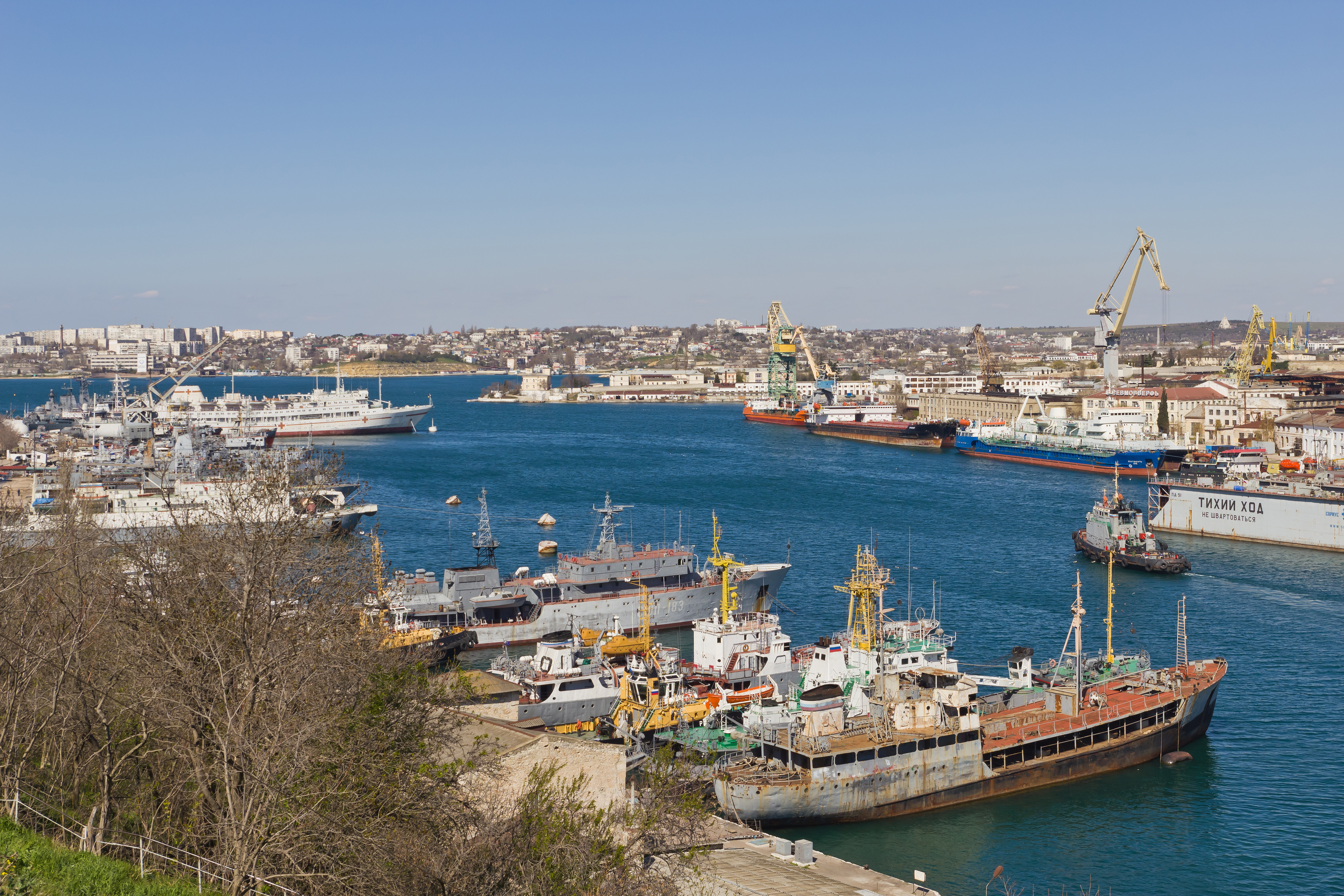
View of Sevastopol naval base.

Despite this agreement, the sides continuously failed to reach an agreement on splitting the fleet. Russia claimed a percentage of coastal installations in Crimea, including the headquarters of fleet at Sevastopol, along with a percentage of ships, while Ukraine objected to Russian ownership of any Ukrainian territory and instead suggested a lease agreement. The Russian delegation opposed the idea of leasing, regarding the bases to be their territory. According to a member of the Russian delegation: "As regards the shore, Ukraine believes that it is its territory and that it may only lease it out. However, we are asking that it also be divided. Not the land, because we agree that it is Ukrainian, but just what is directly pertinent to the functioning of the Fleet." The Ukrainian Ministry of Defence issued a statement in March 1993 that it would submit a proposal to Rada to cancel Yalta agreement, accusing Russia of violating treaty by "distorting its interpretations", diverting Ukrainian funding of joint command for Russian uses, and "inflaming inter-ethnic enmity". The Black Sea Fleet command issued a statement on its own, accusing the Ukrainian Defence Ministry of neglecting fleet's interstate status and "causing moral and material harm to states" with its statement. Crimean parliament called for re-affirming commitment to Yalta accords, voicing concerns. Meanwhile, in May 1993, 203 disputed ships from Black Sea Fleet raised Russia's cross of St. Andrew, in protest against deteriorating living conditions and wages, as the sailors were being paid in Ukrainian currency, the value of which had recently deteriorated significantly against Russian ruble. They also claimed that Russian sailors were getting paid better elsewhere. Ukrainian defence minister Morozov responded by cutting funding to these ships.

Following these incidents, on 31 May, Leonid Kravtuck asked Boris Yeltsin to hold talks. On 17 June, Ukraine and Russia signed agreement to divide the fleet "on the principle of 50% to 50%" starting from September. The former commander of the fleet spoke out against the split, warning that it would allow Turkish navy to "attain exclusive domination in the Black Sea" in two or three years. Yeltsin and Kravtchuk also agreed on sharing the bases in Crimea, and also on balancing the salaries of sailors by providing them dual Russian-Ukrainian citizenship.

At home, Yeltsin's opponent, Alexander Rutskoy, denounced the agreement and voiced support for sailors who were against partitioning the fleet. Rutskoi said that the situation was denigrating to Russia and threatened "degradation and effective annihilation" of the fleet. On 9 July, Supreme Soviet of Russia, composed mainly of Yeltsin's opponents, voted to declare Sevastopol as part of Russia, claiming that the 1954 transfer of Crimea to Ukraine by Khrushchev did not entail Sevastopol. The vote also appeared to be connected to the Ukrainian Parliament's decision to declare ownership of disputed 176 nuclear missiles on its territory inherited from the USSR on 2 July. The Ukrainian Parliament's foreign affairs committee called the declaration of the Russian parliament "tantamount to a declaration of war", and Ukrainian lawmakers called the UN Security Council and NATO to intervene. The US backed Ukraine with the U.S. ambassador to Ukraine Roman Popadiuk saying that the United States considered Sevastopol as a part of Ukraine. Russian President Boris Yeltsin said that he was "ashamed" of the Supreme Soviet's claim on Sevastopol, and made it clear that Russia would not make a move on city. He said that all issues "must be discussed gradually and peacefully. Otherwise, in the end, what would you have me do – declare war on Ukraine?".

In the following months, Ukraine would come under much more economic duress due to rising debt to Russia, which it was unable to pay. Under these circumstances, on 3 September, Russia and Ukraine reached an agreement through the Massandra Accords. The agreement stipulated that Ukraine would give all or part of its share of the former Black Sea Fleet in exchange for relief from the crushing debt. However, this failed to reduce tensions as the agreement was widely criticized. Kravchuk said that Ukraine "did not need" its share anyway and was planning to sell it, but Dmytro Pavlychko, chairman of the Ukrainian Parliament's foreign relations committee, spoke against the agreement by saying that "Couldn't we have found other buyers?", joined by Ukraine Defence Minister Morozov who unleashed criticism of President for agreeing on deal. This agreement provided little settlement in the dispute and it continued to go on without much prospect for ending it. Morozov, Defence Minister of Ukraine, even rejected Massandara Accords by calling them "merely verbal agreements". The Ukrainian government officials described the agreement as a mere proposal put forward by Russians, rather than an agreed strategy.

The rising tensions resulted in the increase of near-clashes between Ukrainian and Russian Black Sea Fleet units. Russian newspaper Izvestia condemned Ukraine for "war-like maneuvers" such as arresting Russian survey ship. Soon, a major crisis arose over what became known as the Odessa Incident. On 8 April 1994, the Ukrainian marines attempted to block a Russian research vessel from leaving the Ukrainian port of Odessa with 10 million dollars' worth radio-navigational equipment, with Ukraine claiming piracy. However, Russian officials claimed that the move was justified by the "Ukraine's failure to finance navigation services on the Black Sea". Russian sailors arrested one Ukrainian Navy border guard for attempting to inspect the ship, while Ukraine sent six ships and four Su-15 fighters to intercept it, although they retreated after an attack group was sent by the Black Sea Fleet. Some have reported that the tracer bullets and water cannons were used to drive off a Ukrainian coastguard vessel. On second day, Ukraine responded to the incident by sending commandos to seize the maintenance base of the fleet's 318th division at Odessa and arrested Russian officers, with Russia claiming that the Russian officers and civilians had been beaten and evicted by Ukrainians. Claiming that the Ukrainian authorities were forcing 18 families out of Odessa, Russia sent a big troopship, a cruiser and an anti-submarine vessel to Odessa from Sevastopol to pick up families, although the further tensions were averted after the ships turned back following the statements of Ukrainian defence minister Vitaliy Radetsky that he "would bar them from entering Odessa". Russian Black Sea Fleet units went on combat alert. Ukrainian navy put Odessa base and Black Sea Fleet river patrol unit under its own control.

These incidents alarmed both sides and on 12 April 1994, the negotiations resumed, with Russia being given nominal 80–85% share in exchange for undisclosed compensation for Ukraine. It was also decided that Russian and Ukrainian fleets would be based separately to avoid conflicts. There were economic reasons for agreement as Ukraine continued to suffer from crushing debt, unable to pay for joint command since December 1993. Kravchuk was also pressured by the fact that a pro-Russian separatist leader Yuriy Meshkov was elected in Crimea in the election. Despite the agreement, Ukraine and Russia still quarrelled over its interpretation, with Russia accusing Ukraine of "unilateral interpretation of the agreement" after Kravtchuk said that Russia would be able to lease "a base, rather than bases" from Ukraine, with the agreement only mentioning that Ukraine and Russia would base their navies separately. Ukrainian president said that the one naval base Ukraine would lease to Russia would be the Sevastopol Naval Base, with Kravchuk saying that "thousands of (Russian) officers live in Sevastopol, their children, their families. If we say they must leave Sevastopol, we could not propose new housing for them elsewhere". However, the Defence Minister of Ukraine made diverging statements, suggesting dividing facilities instead of Ukrainian withdrawal from Sevastopol base. At the same time, he also proposed Russia to base its navy not in Sevastopol, but instead at two other naval bases in Crimea. President Kravchuk also said that Ukraine would take 50% of fleet assets, retain what it needed "according to military doctrine", and then sell each of the remaining ships to Russia, keeping only 10–15% of ships, with this statement also being disputed by Russian defense minister Pavel Grachev. The split of navy was not complete in 10 days following the signing of agreement, despite it stipulating so. Russia specifically waited out to the Ukrainian presidential election in June 1994, in which Leonid Kuchma, an ethnic Russian from eastern Ukraine, was elected as president. Being more open to compromise, Kuchma issued a joint letter with Yeltsin, pledging to take into account the opinions of personnel and the residents of Crimea in the future accords. With the election of Kuchma, calls for secession from Ukraine and unification with Russia decreased in Crimea, as Kuchma himself was in favor of normalization of relations with Russia. Moreover, Kuchma actually moved to eventually arrest Meskhov on charges of separatist revolt, abolish his office and Crimea's constitution deemed as separatist, which finally removed this issue from Black Sea Fleet negotiations.

=== Final accords ===
Despite the expectations, the negotiations still stifled over Russian basing rights and compensation for the 30% share of fleet Ukraine would be transferring to Russia. Russia claimed all naval facilities in Sevastopol and exclusive rights to them in a arrangement similar to agreement on Guantanamo Bay Naval Base, urging Ukraine to move its fleet to Odessa, while Ukraine wanted to divide Sevastopol's shore facilities, arguing that giving Russia all naval facilities would amount to giving up the entire city of Sevastopol. In April 1995, Ukraine floated the idea of US mediation in the dispute, although Russia was unenthusiastic about involving US into CIS affairs. In May 1995, President Kuchma did not request US mediation in the dispute during his meeting with President Bill Clinton.

On 9 June, President Yeltsin and Kuchma met in Sochi to discuss the issue. During the meeting, they agreed that Russia would end up with 81.7% of vessels, Ukraine with 18.3%. Ships would initially be transferred to Ukraine and Russia would acquire its share of ships by buying most of vessels back from Ukraine. Russia would lease Sevastopol base and pay mostly in the form of energy supplies and debt forgiveness. Ukraine would use other parts of large Sevastopol base, however, the future site remained unannounced.

Although the Sochi accord was described as a breakthrough, the Union of Officers of Ukraine called for annulling it, accusing Kuchma of "surrendering to Yeltsin's demands". Moscow newspaper Moskovskij Komsomolets called the deal unsuccessful, saying that Ukraine would claim the best ships in the fleet. The negotiations stifled again, although no crises occurred this time. Although four PT-boats were handled to Ukraine, there was still little progress. In December 1996, Russia's newly appointed Security Council head Alexandr Lebed once again argued that Sevastopol was never actually handled to Ukraine in 1954. Meanwhile Russian Duma passed a non-binding draft law to rescind the Sochi agreement and warned that it would never cede Sevastopol. Moscow's mayor, Yury Luzhkov argued that Sevastopol was a Russian city never to be ceded to Ukraine, which led to Ukraine's foreign ministry threatening to declare him persona non grata in Ukraine. The tensions which followed were eased up in October 1996 during meeting of Kuchma and Yeltsin in Barvikha. The decision was made to postpone the issue of Sevastopol and have its status determined by a special working group.

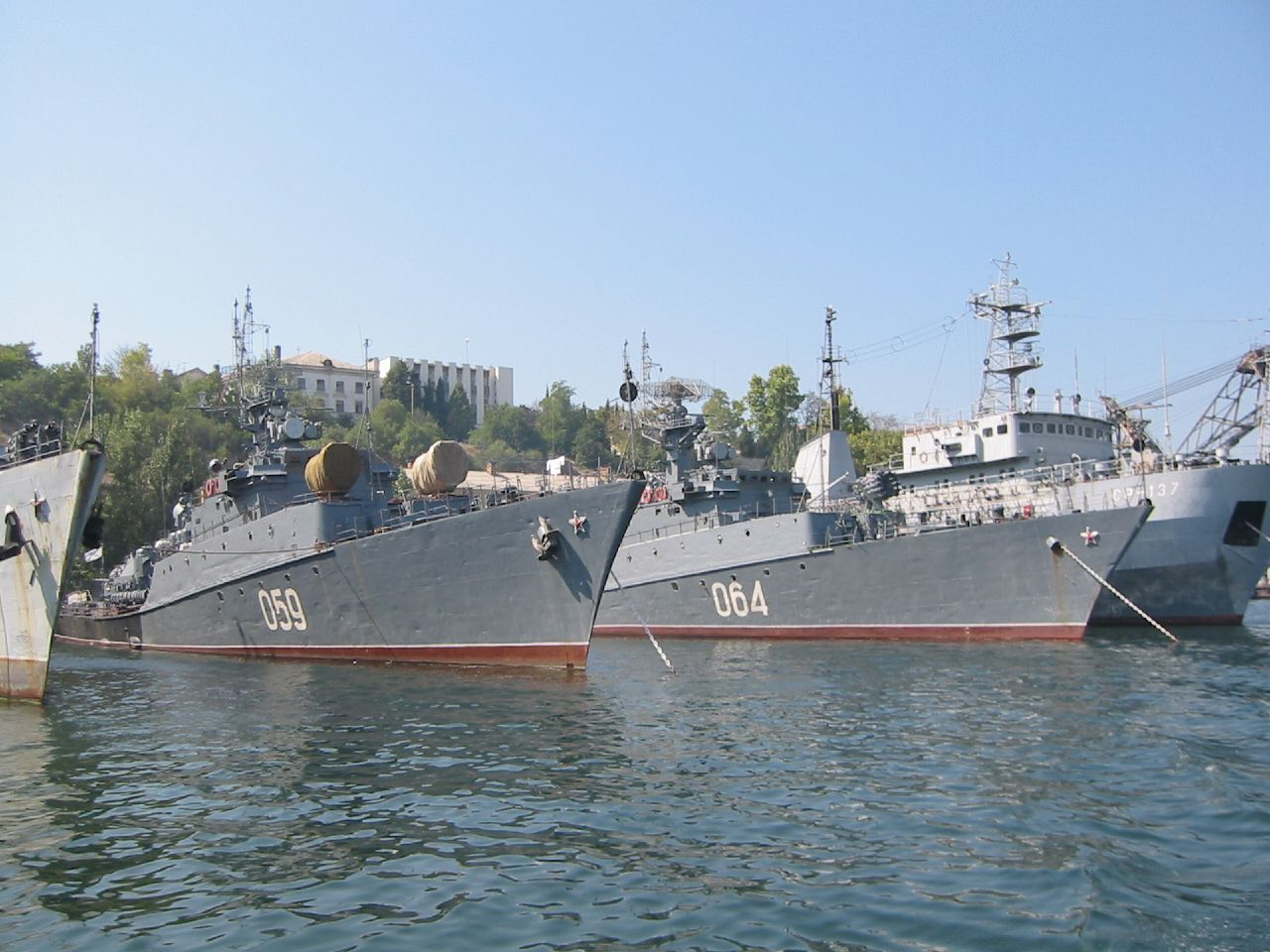
Russian ships in Sevastopol in 2005.

A series of conciliatory steps by April 1997 enabled the dispute to be finally resolved. Ukraine passed a new and special provision in the Ukrainian constitution that allowed foreign military units to lease existing military bases on Ukrainian territory for the temporary deployment of their forces. The final accord was signed on 28 May 1997 between Ukrainian prime minister Pavlo Lazarenko and Russian prime minister Viktor Chernomyrdin. Sevastopol was leased to Russia for 20 years, while Ukraine agreed to have its navy participate in joint operational-strategic exercises with the Russian Black Sea Fleet. The agreement allowed Sevastopol to be used by both Russian and Ukrainian navies. Ukraine received 50% of the fleet, then handed 38%, valued at US$526 million, to Russia as a payment for energy debt. Ultimately, Ukraine retained 12% of the fleet, that is, 124 surface vessels and one submarine. The agreement was ratified by the Ukrainian Rada and the Russian Federal Council in March 1999.

== Georgian claims ==
During the dissolution of the Soviet Union, a portion of Black Sea Fleet was located on the territory of Georgia. In April 1992, Georgia made it apparent that it was interested to secure control over the part of the fleet located in its ports in Poti and Ochamchire. The Georgian government proposed to divide the fleet either equally among Ukraine, Georgia and Russia, or proportionally based on the extent of coastline of each state. The commander in chief of the Ukrainian navy said that Ukraine was preparing to share the fleet with Georgia and Russia. In June 1992, Georgia and Russia signed an agreement on handing Poti and Ochamchire bases to Georgia and some ships in these bases. In September 1993, it was reported that during the Russian Foreign Minister Pavel Grachev's visit to Georgia, it was agreed that before agreeing on the apportion of ships, none of them would be removed from Poti and Ochamchire bases. However, the fleet's ships soon withdrew because of Georgian Civil War, with security reasons being cited. In February 1996, Georgia again began to make claims on the ships and to be included in the negotiations. Ukraine supported Georgian claims on 32 vessels which had been based in Poti previously, but was unable to include them in the 1997 agreement, which caused strong protests from Georgian president Eduard Shevardnadze. Russian deputy foreign minister rejected Georgian claims on the fleet, saying that the decision to divide it was taken in January 1992 through the CIS while Georgia was not part of it. Russian Defense Council secretary Iurii Baturin said that the value of the Poti base which was handed over to Georgia far exceeded that of the vessels previously stationed there, satisfying all possible Georgian claims on the fleet. However, the vessels were still handed over to Georgia by Russia in October 1997. The Georgia's inability to assert its claims and take part in the negotiations had been connected to its issues of territorial control of the naval bases because of Georgian Civil War, as well as the topic not being a priority on Georgia's security agenda because of far more pressing problems, such as territorial integrity.

== Sources ==
- Felgenhauer, Tyler (1999). Ukraine, Russia, and the Black Sea Fleet Accords (PDF). Woodrow Wilson School of Public and International Affairs, Princeton University.
- Deyermond, Ruth (2008). "The Black Sea Fleet: Russia, Ukraine, and Georgia". Security and Sovereignty in the Former Soviet Union. Lynne Rienner Publishers. ISBN 978-1-58826-576-0.
