= Laspi Pass =

Mountain pass in Crimea

Coordinates: 44°25′31″N 33°43′57″E

Laspi Pass

The Laspi Pass (Ukrainian: Ласпінський перевал; Russian: Ласпинский перевал) (350 m) is the highest point of the Sevastopol-Yalta (South Coast) highway in the Crimea along the former route H19 renamed as 67K-1. It is located where the route enters the Yalta wooden mountain reserve near village of Tylove.

The mountain pass offers views of Cape Aya and Laspi Bay of the Black Sea, situated just 700 meters to the south. It is dominated by a cliff named after Nikolai Garin-Mikhailovsky, a Russian writer who helped build the road. Another attraction is an Orthodox chapel commemorating the bimillennium of Christ's birth. The pass is sometimes confused with the Baydar Gate, a mountain pass seldom used today.
