= Baydar Valley =

Valley in Sevastopol, Crimea

Coordinates: 44°28′N 33°48′E

Baydar Valley

Baydar Valley sprawls northeasterly for 16 km (9.9 mi) in the Balaklava Raion of Sevastopol, Crimea. It is the source of the Chorna river and the location of the Chorna River Reservoir, Sevastopol's largest body of fresh water. Prehistoric menhir-statues still dot the landscape. A highway from Yalta to Sevastopol traverses the dale. The Baydar Pass connects the valley to the Black Sea coast. Most of the valley is protected as a national zakaznik, called the Baydar Nature Reserve.
