= Baydar Shamsu =

Coordinates: 35°46′N 36°28′E

Baydar Shamsu بيدر شمسو
- Village
- Location in Syria
- Country: Syria
- Governorate: Idlib
- District: Ariha District
- Subdistrict: Muhambal Nahiyah

Population (2004)
  - Total: 768
- Time zone: UTC+2 (EET)
  - Summer (DST): UTC+3 (EEST)
- City Qrya Pcode: C4310

Baydar Shamsu (Arabic: بيدر شمسو) is a Syrian village in Muhambal Nahiyah in Ariha District, Idlib. According to the Syria Central Bureau of Statistics (CBS), Baydar Shamsu had a population of 768 in the 2004 census.
