= Baydar Gate =

Mountain pass in Crimea

Coordinates: 44°24′25″N 33°46′58″E

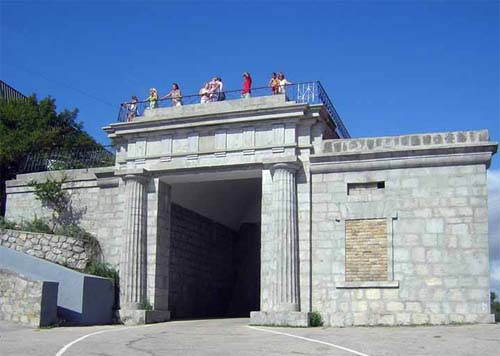
- Baydar Gate in 2008
- Location: Foros, Crimea

Immovable Monument of National Significance of Ukraine
- Official name: Байдарські ворота (Baydar Gate)
- Type: Architecture
- Reference no.: 0100120

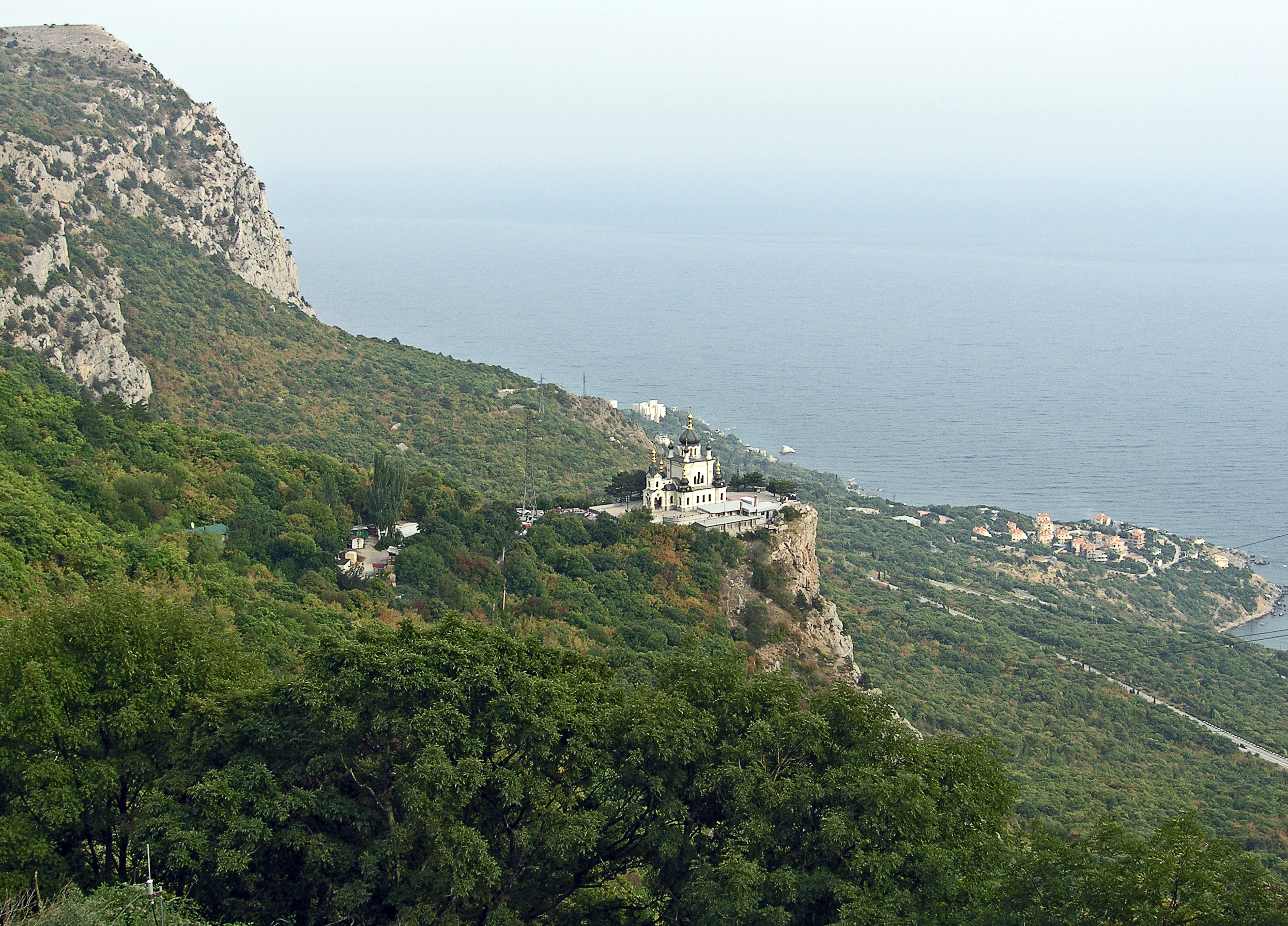
View of Foros from the Baydar Gate

The Baydar Gate is a mountain pass in the Crimean Mountains connecting the Baidar Valley with the Black Sea coast. It has an elevation of 503 metres or 1,650 feet. It is enclosed by Mount Chelebi (657 m) and Mount Ckhu-Bair (705 m). The old Yalta-Sevastopol highway, dating from the 1830s and seldom used today, passes through here. When the highway was completed in 1848, the so-called Propylaea were built of local limestone to commemorate the event. This Neoclassical gate offers scenic views, including that of the picturesque Foros Church set atop a 400-metre cliff overlooking the sea coast.

== See also ==
- Laspi Pass, a neighbouring mountain pass, the one normally used today
