= Yalta Mountain-Forest Nature Reserve =

Nature reserve in Crimea

- Ukrainian: Ялтинський гірсько-лісовий природний заповідник Russian: Ялтинский горно-лесной природный заповедник
- IUCN category Ia (strict nature reserve)
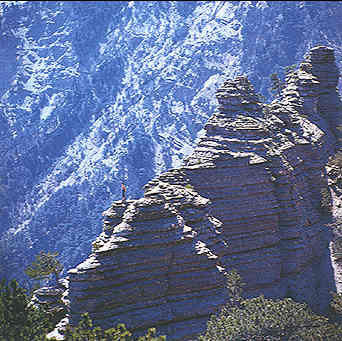
- Yalta Mountain-Forest Nature Reserve

- Location within Crimea
- Interactive map of Yalta Mountain-Forest Nature Reserve
- Location: Crimea
- Coordinates: 44°27′29″N 34°05′25″E
- Area: 14,523 hectares (35,887 acres; 145 km^{2}; 56 sq mi)
- Established: 1973
- Governing body: Ministry of Ecology and Natural Resources (Ukraine) (de jure); Ministry of Natural Resources and Environment (Russia) (de facto)
- Website: https://yglpz.umi.ru/

Yalta Mountain-Forest Nature Reserve (Ukrainian: Ялтинський гірсько-лісовий природний заповідник) is a protected nature reserve that covers the southwestern ranges of the Crimean Mountains, along the south coast of the Crimean Peninsula. The reserve is in the administrative district of Yalta Municipality

== Topography ==
The reserve stretches for about 40 km along the southern slopes of the mountainous southwest of the Crimean peninsula. At its widest it is about 23 km north-to-south. The borders do not extend down to the sea except in a few spots to the south. The highest mountain in the reserve is Ai-Petri, at 1,234 metres (4,049 ft) above sea level. The slopes are steep, built on Triassic schist, overlaid by Jurassic limestone, and Quaternary loess on the ridges.

The top of the ridge is a hilly plateau that varies in width from a few hundred meters up to 7 km. The plateau holds karst caves and caverns.

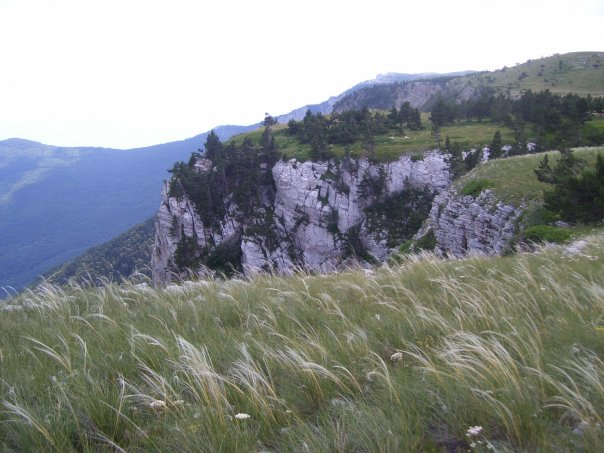
Meadow-steppe on flat ridges, with forested slopes, in the reserve

== Climate and ecoregion ==
The official climate designation for the Yalta Mountain area is "Humid continental climate - hot summer sub-type" (Köppen climate classification Dfa), with large seasonal temperature differentials and a hot summer (at least four months averaging over 10 °C (50 °F), at least one of which is over 22 °C (72 °F). Average temperatures at the lower elevations in the reserve range from −3.5 °C (25.7 °F) in January to 24 °C (75 °F) in July, and annual precipitation averages 550-560 mm. At higher elevations in the mountains, temperatures are cooler and precipitation higher (up to 1,050 mm/year).

== Flora and fauna ==
Approximately 75% of the reserve is forested. The floral communities depend on the altitude, in four main zones. From sea level to 400 meters, oak trees and Juniperus excelsa are most typical. From 400 to 900 meters the dominant trees are Black European Pine (a subspecies of Pinus nigra, with stands of Sessile oak (Quercus petraea), ash and hornbeam. From 900 to 1200 meters are various pine forests on the slopes, with beeches on the level areas. Meadows steppes are found above 1200 feet.

== Public use ==
As a strict nature reserve, the Yalta Reserve's primary purpose is protection of nature and scientific study. Public access is limited: mass recreation and construction of facilities is prohibited, as are hunting and fishing. The reserve does support environmental education, and maintains a number of "ecological trails" that are open to public hikers. As with all reserves on the Crimean Peninsula, ownership is subject to dispute.

== See also ==
- Lists of Nature Preserves of Ukraine (class Ia protected areas)
- National Parks of Ukraine (class II protected areas)
