= Baydar (surname) =

Baydar is a surname of Turkish origin meaning lion. Notable people with the surname are as follows:

- Alaattin Baydar (1901–1990), Turkish football player
- Mehmet Baydar (1924–1973), Turkish assassinated diplomat
- Metin Lütfi Baydar (born 1960), Turkish medical scientist
- Oya Baydar (born 1940), Turkish writer
- Yavuz Baydar, Turkish journalist
