= Partition Treaty on the Status and Conditions of the Black Sea Fleet =

Three 1997 treaties between Russia and Ukraine

Partition Treaty on the Black Sea Fleet
Partition Treaty on the Status and Conditions of the Black Sea Fleet
- Signed: 28 May 1997; 29 years ago
- Effective: 12 July 1999; 27 years ago
- Expiration: 28 March 2014; 12 years ago
- Signatories: Ukraine; Russia
- Languages: Russian, Ukrainian

Full text
- Partition Treaty on the Status and Conditions of the Black Sea Fleet at Wikisource

The Partition Treaty on the Status and Conditions of the Black Sea Fleet consists of three bilateral agreements between Russia and Ukraine signed on 28 May 1997 whereby the two countries established two independent national fleets, divided armaments and bases between them, and set forth conditions for basing of the Russian Black Sea Fleet in Crimea. The treaty was supplemented by provisions in the Russian–Ukrainian Friendship Treaty, which was signed three days later. Russia unilaterally terminated the Partition Treaty in 2014 after it annexed Crimea.

== Background ==
During the 1990s, the dispute over control of the Black Sea Fleet and Crimean naval facilities was a source of tensions between Russia and Ukraine. On 10 June 1995, an interim agreement was signed, however, two additional years were needed to resolve remaining issues.

Moscow mayor Yuriy Luzhkov campaigned to claim the city of Sevastopol which housed the fleet, and in December 1996 the Russian Federation Council officially endorsed the claim. Spurred by these territorial claims, Ukraine proposed a "special partnership" with NATO in January 1997.

== Content ==
Under the terms of the agreements:

- The Soviet Black Sea Fleet that was headquartered in the Crimean Peninsula at the time, was partitioned between Russia (81.7%) and Ukraine (18.3%). In exchange, Russia agreed to pay $526 million as a compensation for its part of the divided fleet.
- Ukraine agreed to lease Crimean naval facilities to Russia for 20 years until 2017, with an automatic 5 years renewal option. Russia would pay Ukraine $97 million annually for leasing Crimean bases. This payment was deducted from the cost of Russian gas provided and billed to Ukraine. The basing rules were set in a status of forces agreement, namely Agreement between Ukraine and the Russian Federation on the Status and Conditions of the Stationing of the Black Sea Fleet [BSF] on the territory of Ukraine. The treaty also allowed Russia to maintain up to 25,000 troops, 24 artillery systems, 132 armored vehicles, and 22 military planes on the Crimean Peninsula.
- Russia was bound to "respect the sovereignty of Ukraine, honor its legislation and preclude interference in the internal affairs of Ukraine" and, furthermore, Russian military personnel had to show their "military identification cards" when crossing the Ukrainian-Russian border; Russian forces could operate "beyond their deployment sites" only after "coordination with the competent agencies of Ukraine.".

A fourth agreement, the Kharkiv Pact, was signed on 21 April 2010 and extended the lease until 2042 (with possibility of renewal for an additional five years) in exchange for a multiyear discounted contract to provide Ukraine with Russian natural gas.

On 28 March 2014, following the annexation of Crimea, Russian President Vladimir Putin submitted proposals to the State Duma on terminating a number of Russia–Ukraine agreements, including the Black Sea Fleet partition treaty and the Kharkiv Pact. The State Duma approved the abrogation of these Russian-Ukrainian agreements unanimously by 433 members of parliament on 31 March 2014.

== Full names of the treaties ==
- Agreement between the Russian Federation and Ukraine on the Parameters of the Division of the Black Sea Fleet
- Agreement between the Russian Federation and Ukraine on the Status and Conditions of the Presence of the Russian Federation Black Sea Fleet on the territory of Ukraine
- Agreement between the Government of the Russian Federation and the Government of Ukraine on Payments Associated with the Division of the Black Sea Fleet and Its Presence on the territory of Ukraine
