= Sevastopol Bay =

City harbour in Eastern Europe

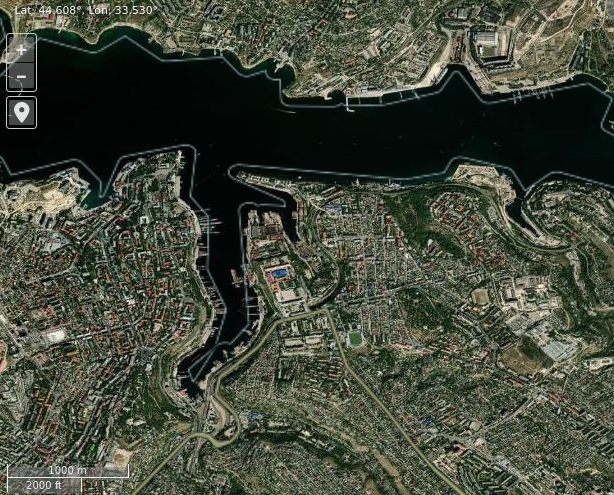
- Satellite imagery of Sevastopol Bay

- Location within Sevastopol
- Coordinates: 44°37′10″N 33°32′24″E
- Type: bay
- Primary inflows: Chorna River
- Primary outflows: Black Sea

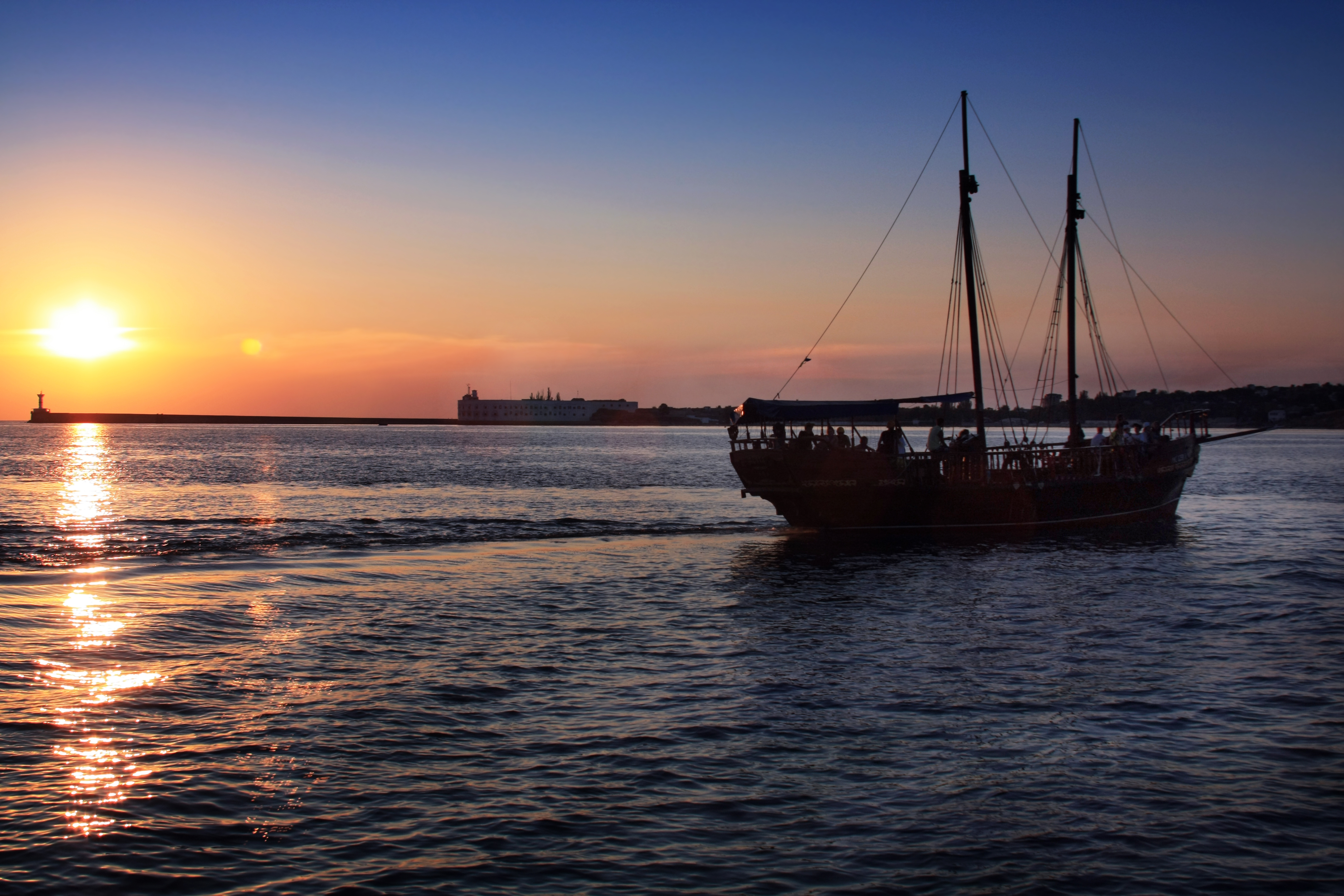
A view of the Bay of Sevastopol in 2012.

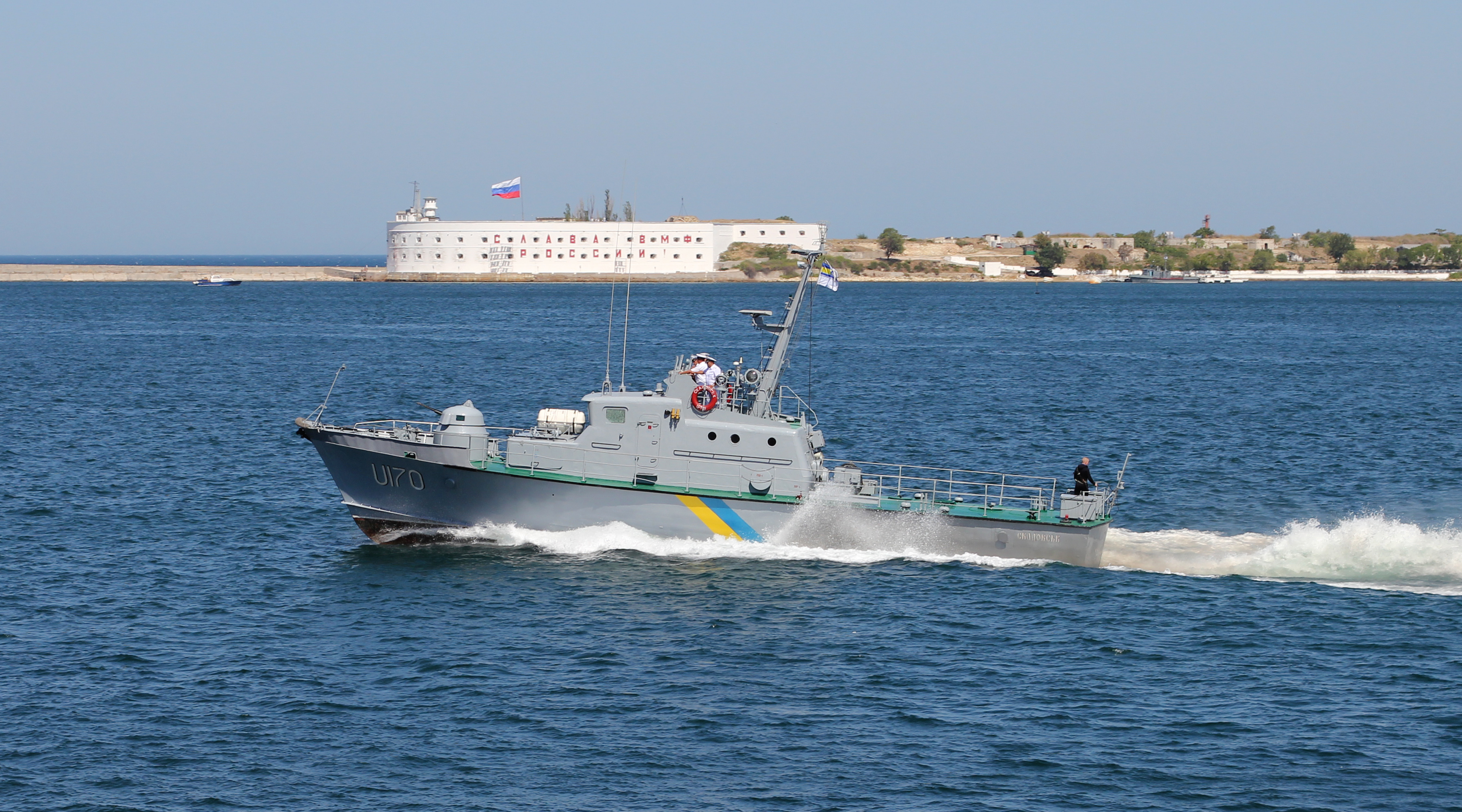
Ukrainian Navy artillery boat U170 in the Bay of Sevastopol in 2012

Sevastopol Bay (Note: Ukrainian: Севастопольська бухта, romanized: Sevastopoľska buchta; Russian: Севастопольская бухта, romanized: Sevastopoljskaja buhta) is a city harbor that includes a series of smaller bays carved out along its shores. The bay of Sevastopol splits the city of Sevastopol into the southern side and the northern side. It serves as an extension of the Chorna River and stretches for 7.5 km (4.7 mi) which is the longest of them all.

The bay of Sevastopol stretches from the open sea eastward to the Inkerman Cave Monastery at the end, narrowing down and finishing at the mouth of the Chorna River. The bay forms the seaward approach to the city. Covering a large expanse of water, the harbor serves as a comfortable anchorage for a fleet. From the beginning of the 20th century it housed cruisers and ironclads.

The number of piers along the shores of the harbor far exceeds the number of bays. The bay serves as a home to a commercial port as well as a naval base. Just outside of Sevastopol Bay is located a fishing port.

== See also ==
- Port of Sevastopol
