= Chorna (river) =

River in Crimea

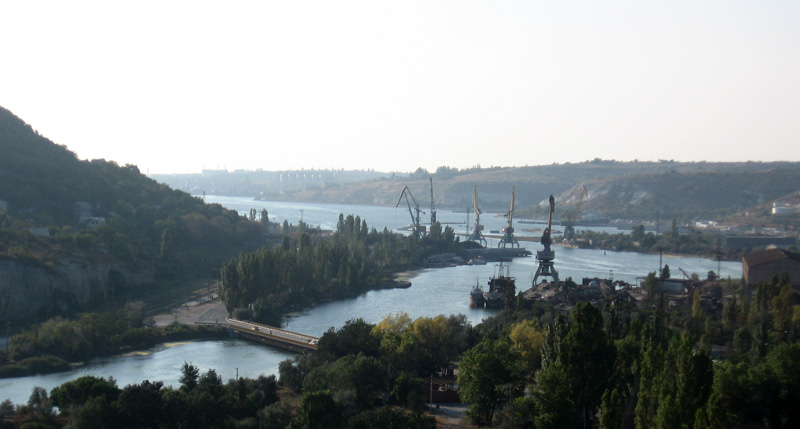
- The mouth of the Chorna River at Inkerman
- Native name: Чорна (Ukrainian)

Location
- Region: Crimea

Physical characteristics
- Source
  - location: Rodnikivske
  - coordinates: 44°27′48″N 33°51′36″E
- Mouth: Sevastopol Bay
  - coordinates: 44°36′29″N 33°35′54″E
- Length: 41 km (25 mi)
- Basin size: 463 km^{2} (179 sq mi)

The Chorna, (Note: Ukrainian: Чорна, romanized: Čorna, IPA: [tʃɔrnɐ]) Chyornaya (Note: Russian: Чёрная, romanized: Čjornaja, IPA: [tɕɵrnəjə], lit. 'Black River') or Chorhun (Note: Crimean Tatar: Чоргъуна, romanized: Çorğuna, pronounced [tʃoɾʁʊˈnɑ]) is a small river in southern Crimea. It is 34.5 kilometres (21.4 mi) long.

The Chorna River begins in the Baydar Valley northeast of the small town of Rodnikivske (44° 28' N 33° 51' EG), just west of which it flows into a reservoir. From there it continues in a westerly direction to the town of Inkerman (Belokamensk) where it enters the Bay of Sevastopol, on the southwest coast of the Crimean peninsula.

Inkerman was a key location during the Crimean War of 1853–1856 and the Chorna lends its name to the Battle of Chernaya (Chyornaya) River of 1855.

== Object 221 (Nora) ==
Located at the coordinates +44° 31' 4.00", +33° 42' 5.00" near the Chorna River and Morozivka, which was previously known as Alsou or Alsu before 1948, in the Alsou tract about 2.5 miles (4.0 km) east of Balaklava near the Yalta Sebastopol highway is the reserve command post (ZKP) of the USSR Black Sea Fleet (Russian: ЗКП) in Crimea, which is also known as Objekt 221 or Object 221 and code named "Alsu-2" (Russian: «Алсу-2») or "Nora" (Russian: «Нора»), and is on the eastern slope of the mountains and beneath the 495 metres (1,624 ft) Mount Mishen (Russian: Гора Мишень) which is also called Shaan-Kaya (Russian: Шаан-Кая) or the Nishan-Kaya mountain (Ukrainian: Гора Нішан-Кая). The construction of the underground command post started in 1977 and continued for about 15 years. The pioneer camp "Alsu" is located nearby. In July 2021 with Russian Marines wearing black berets on guard duty, construction began to restore the underground facility allegedly as part of Patriot Park (Russian: парк Патриот).
