= Kanaka, Crimea =

Kanaka Russian and Ukrainian: Канака Crimean Tatar: Kanaka
- Resort
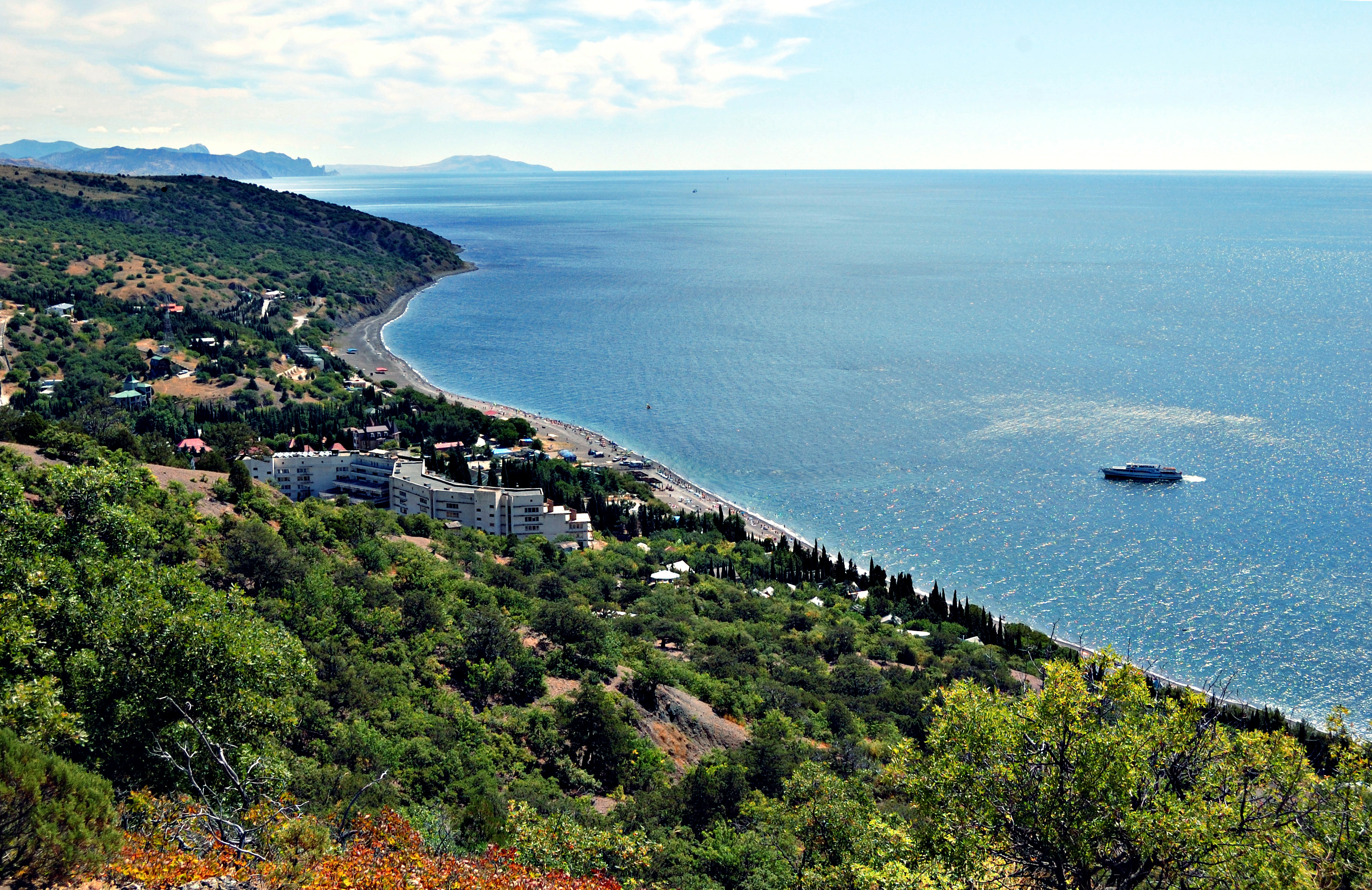

- Location in Crimea
- Coordinates: 44°47′11.5″N 34°38′46″E
- Municipality: Alushta
- First mentioned: 1381
- Elevation: 10 m (33 ft)
- Time zone: UTC+3 (MSK)

Kanaka (Russian and Ukrainian: Канака; Crimean Tatar: Kanaka, Канака) is a resort located at the foot of the Crimean Mountains on the Southern Coast of Crimea, between the cities of Alushta and Sudak, east of the village of Rybache. The resort is situated within the Kanaka Nature Reserve, known for its ancient juniper groves. Despite its isolated location from neighboring villages, Kanaka does not have the official status of a separate settlement. Until 1990, it was known as the "Luch" resort, or Kanakskaya Balka. Administratively, it falls under the jurisdiction of the Pryvitne village council within the Alushta Municipality.

Kanaka's pebble beach stretches approximately 2 km in length and 20–30 meters in width.

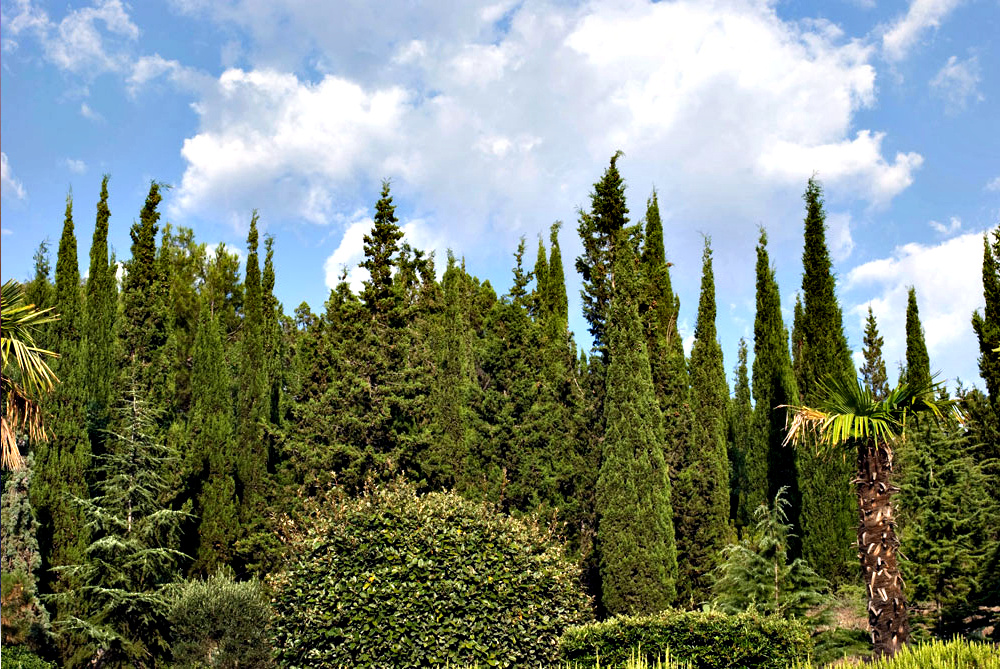
Cypress groves in Kanaka

The Kanaka ravine contains a relic forest of tall junipers and wild pistachios. Similar forests have only been preserved in Foros, near the Nikitsky Botanical Gardens at Cape Martyan, in Kanaka, and in Novyi Svit.

== History ==
The first known mention of Kanaka appears in historical sources as "De la Canecha" in a 1381 treaty between the Genoese and Elias Bey of Solkhat.

A 1915 report by the Ministry of Agriculture and the Land Improvement Department, preserved in the Crimean State Archive, highlighted the region's favorable natural and climatic conditions:

Kanaka Ravine... suggests the desirability of creating a new cultural center here, in this deserted and sparsely populated area.

The beach of Kanaka Ravine was described as "one of the best... from Foros to Feodosia." Plans were made to construct a resort for "sick and wounded soldiers" under the name "Alexandria," with funds collected through a national donation campaign. It was intended to feature roads, a park, a church, and sanatorium buildings. However, the events of the Russian Revolution of 1917 prevented these plans from being realized.

In 1947, Kanaka Ravine was designated a natural monument.

In 1961, the Soviet government began constructing state dachas in the ravine for employees of the Ministry of General Machine Building. During this period, the "Luch" resort (now "Kanaka") and twenty small dachas, known as "general's cottages," were built. The landscape planning of the ravine was carried out by architect Boris Kondratsky.

Recent plans have included further construction in the ravine, leading to deforestation of the wild pistachio and juniper trees.

== Present ==
Today, Kanaka is the only settlement in Crimea built exclusively with resorts, guest houses, and cottages. Notable establishments include the "Volga" and "Kanaka" resorts, private guesthouses "Caspian" and "Barakat," the "Orchid" resort, the "Dnepr" recreation center, and small hotels such as "Magnolia-Kanaka," "Cypress," "Bagira 2003," and "Kanaka-Lux."

== See also ==
- Crimean Nature Reserve
