= Vesele, Sudak Municipality =

Vesele Веселе
- Village
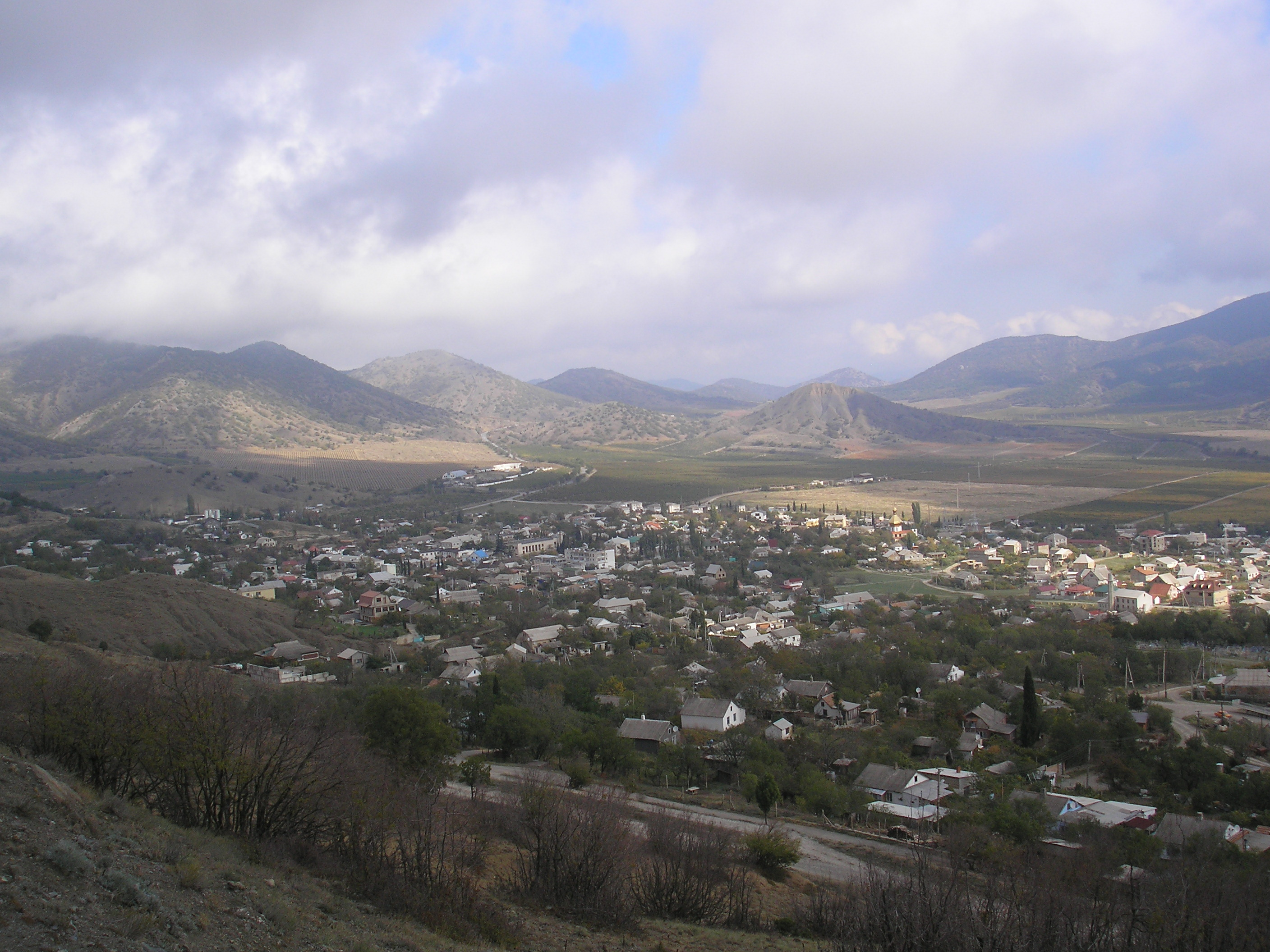
- View of Vesele with the Crimean Mountains in the background.

- Location of Vesele in Crimea
- Coordinates: 44°51′19″N 34°52′43″E
- Republic: Crimea
- Municipality: Sudak Municipality
- First mentioned: 1520
- Elevation: 126 m (413 ft)

Population (2014)
  - Total: 1,675
- Time zone: UTC+4 (MSK)
- Postal code: 98031
- Area code: +380 6566
- Website: http://rada.gov.ua/

Vesele or Vesyoloye (Ukrainian: Веселе; Russian: Весёлое) is a village in the Sudak Municipality of the Crimea, a territory recognized by a majority of states as part of Ukraine and annexed and claimed by Russia as the Republic of Crimea.

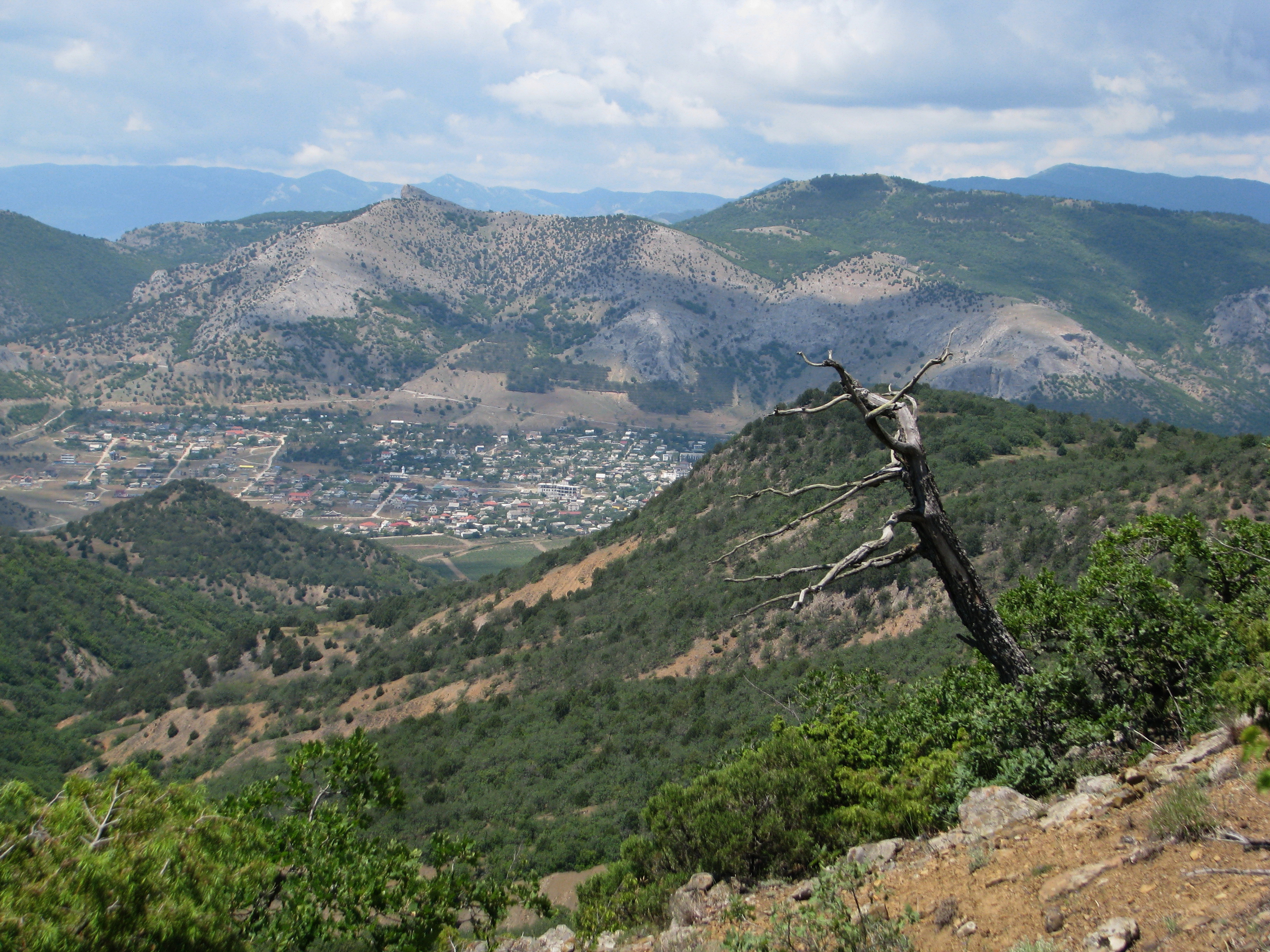
View of Vesyoloye from Mount Perchem

Previously, the settlement was known as the Kutlak village (Crimean Tatar: Qutlaq). Following the forced deportation of the Crimean Tatars in 1944, the Presidium of the Supreme Soviet of the Russian SFSR published a decree on May 18, 1948 renaming the settlement along with many others throughout Crimea from their native Crimean Tatar names to their current variants.

Vesele is located on Crimea's southern shore at an elevation of 126 metres (413 ft). Its population was 1,596 in the 2001 Ukrainian census. Its current population is 1,675 (2014 Census).
