= Crimean Submediterranean forest complex =

Ecoregion on the Black Sea coast

Crimean submediterranean forest complex
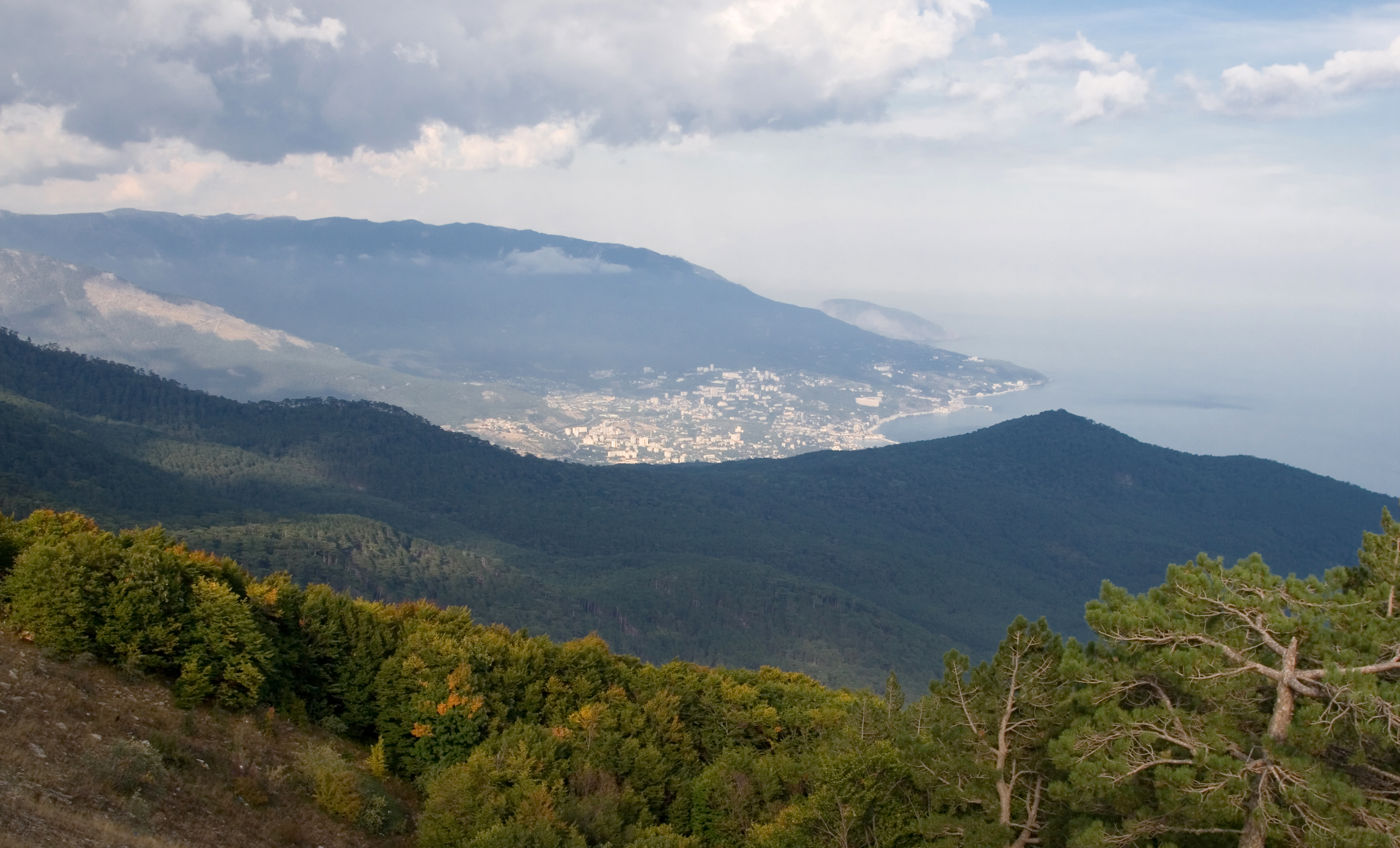
- View over Yalta

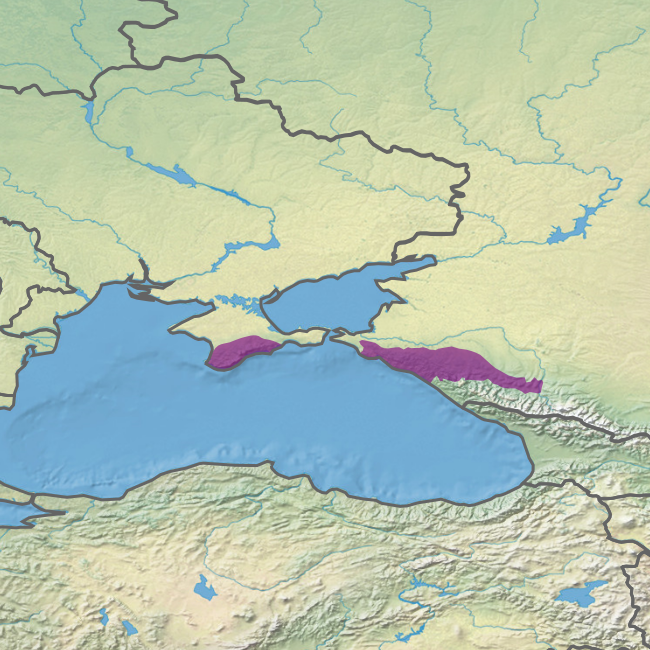
- Ecoregion territory (in purple)

Ecology
- Realm: Palearctic
- Biome: temperate broadleaf and mixed forests
- Borders: Caucasus mixed forests; Pontic steppe

Geography
- Area: 30,009 km^{2} (11,587 mi^{2})
- Countries: Russia; Ukraine (Crimea)

Conservation
- Conservation status: critical/endangered
- Global 200: European-Mediterranean montane mixed forest
- Protected: 3,144 km^{2} (10%)

The Crimean Submediterranean forest complex is an ecoregion on the Black Sea coast of Russia and Ukraine. It is in the temperate broadleaf and mixed forests biome.

== Geography ==
The ecoregion consists of two coastal enclaves on northern coast of the Black Sea. The western one occupies the southern coast of Crimea, extending into the Crimean Mountains, the and the eastern one occupies the Black Sea coast of Krasnodar Krai, extending inland and eastward along the northwest flank of the Caucasus. It is bounded on the north by the Pontic steppe ecoregion, on the south by the Black Sea, and on the southeast by the Caucasus mixed forests.

== Flora ==
At elevations below 400 meters woodlands and maquis shrublands predominate, with oak, Stone pine (Pinus pinea), Aleppo pine (Pinus halepensis) Christ's thorn (Paliurus spina-christi), Mastic tree (Pistacia lentiscus), Pyracantha coccinea, and sclerophyll shrubs.

Between 400 and 800 meters forests predominate with Pitsundian pine (Pinus brutia), Downy oak (Quercus pubescens), Oriental hornbeam (Carpinus orientalis), and European ash (Fraxinus excelsior).

From 800 to 1300 meters elevation forests predominate with Scots pine (Pinus sylvestris) Oriental beech (Fagus orientalis), and juniper woodlands.

== Culture ==
The region's warm summers and mild winters make it a popular resort destination. Cities and towns in the ecoregion include Yalta, Alupka, Alushta, Sevastopol, and Novorossiysk. The region's mild winters support vineyards and fruit orchards.

== Protected areas ==
3,144 km^{2}, or 10%, of the ecoregion are protected areas. Another 56% is forested but unprotected.

Crimea

- Cape Martian Reserve
- Crimean Nature Reserve (including the Swan Islands Nature Reserve)
- Karadag Nature Reserve
- Kazantyp Nature Reserve
- Yalta Mountain-Forest Nature Reserve

Kuban

- Utrish State Nature Reserve, in the Abrau Peninsula
