= Okhotnichy =

Okhotnichy (Russian: Охотничий; masculine), Okhotnichya (Охотничья; feminine), or Okhotnichye (Охотничье; neuter) is the name of several rural localities in Russia:

- Okhotnichy, Primorsky Krai (or Okhotnichye), a selo in Pozharsky District of Primorsky Krai
- Okhotnichy, Udmurt Republic, a village in Staroutchansky Selsoviet of Alnashsky District in the Udmurt Republic
- Okhotnichye, Republic of Crimea, a settlement under the administrative jurisdiction of the town of republic significance of Yalta in the Republic of Crimea
- Okhotnichye, Kaliningrad Oblast, a settlement in Mozyrsky Rural Okrug of Pravdinsky District in Kaliningrad Oblast
