= Crimean Mountains =

Mountain range along the southeastern coast of Crimea

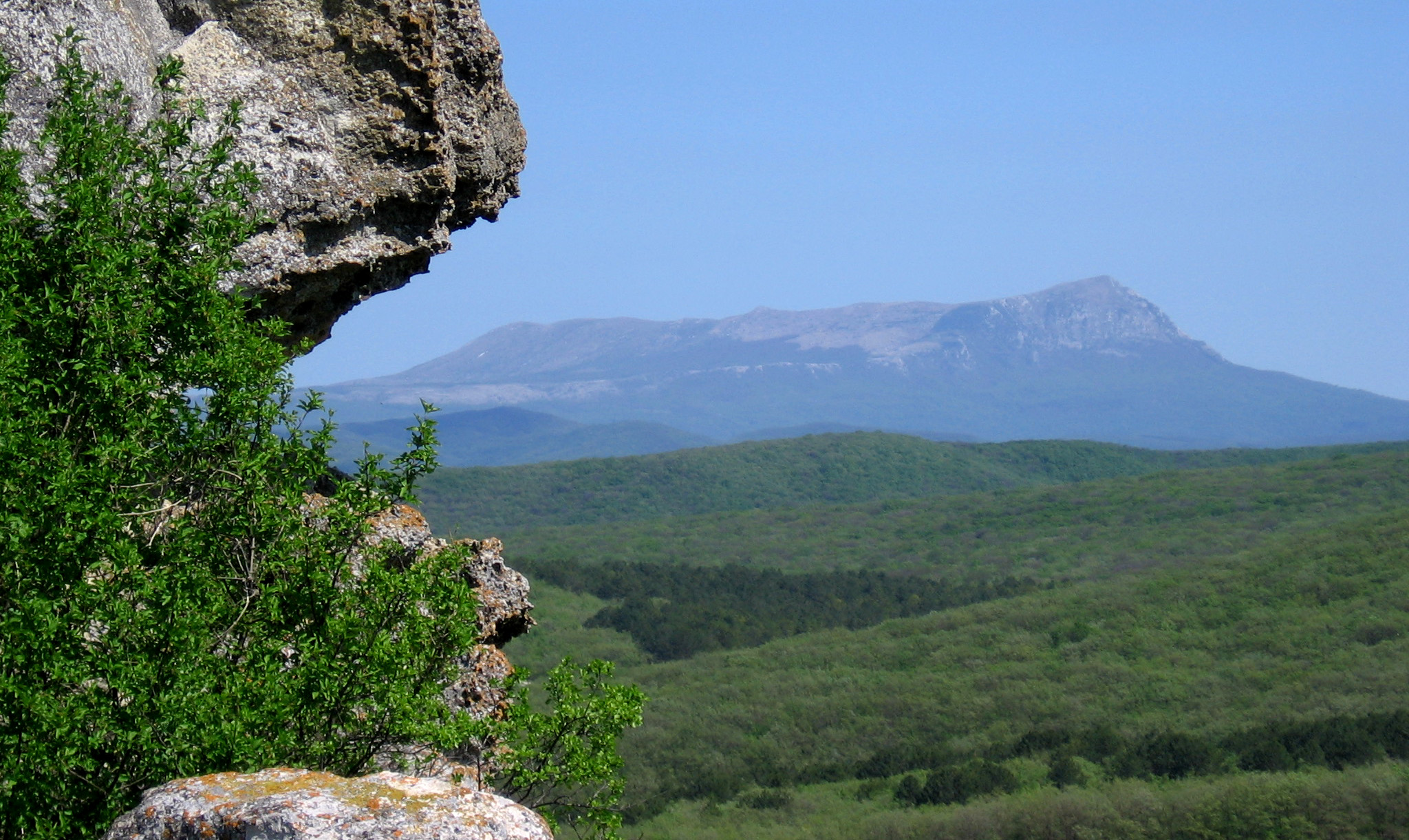
- Chatyr-Dag plateau

Highest point
- Peak: Roman-Kosh
- Elevation: 1,545 m (5,069 ft)
- Coordinates: 44°36′47″N 34°14′36″E

Naming
- Native name: Qırım dağları (Crimean Tatar); Кримські гори (Ukrainian); Крымские горы (Russian)

Geography
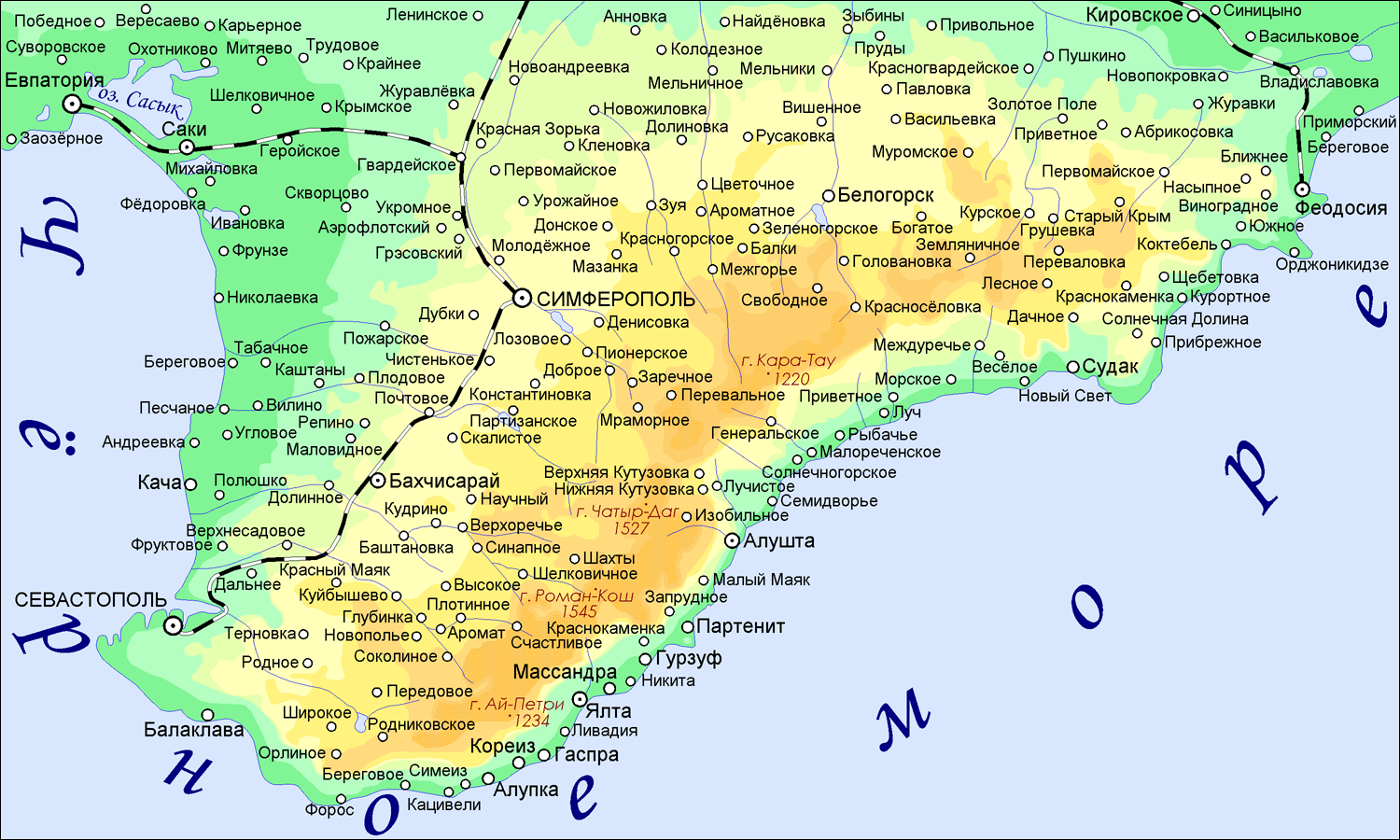
- Location: Southern Crimea
- Range coordinates: 44°45′N 34°30′E

Geology
- Rock age: Cretaceous

The Crimean Mountains (Note: Crimean Tatar: Къырым дагълары, romanized: Qırım dağları; Ukrainian: Кримські гори, romanized: Krymsjki hory; Russian: Крымские горы, romanized: Krymskije gory) or the Yayla Mountains (Note: Crimean Tatar: Яйла Дагълары, romanized: Yayla Dağları) (/ˈjeɪlə/ YAY-lə) are a range of mountains running parallel to the south-eastern coast of Crimea, between about 8–13 kilometers (5–8 miles) from the sea. Toward the south, the mountains drop steeply to the Black Sea, and to the north, they change slowly into a steppe landscape.

== Geography ==
The Crimean Mountains are a relatively young range of fold origin, which comprises a part of the Alpide belt mountain system. They are located in the southern part of Crimea and comprise approximately 20% of the peninsula's area. The mountains span for approximately 150 km between the cities of Sevastopol and Feodosia, reaching a width of 40-50 kilometers. The three main ranges comprising Crimean Mountains get progressively higher from north to south, with the southern side of the main range (Yayla) steeply descending towards the Southern Coast of Crimea.

=== Subranges ===
The Crimean Mountains consist of three subranges. The highest is the Main Range, which is subdivided into several yaylas or mountain plateaus (yayla or yaylak is Turkic for "alpine meadow"). They are:

- Baydar yayla
- Ai-Petri yayla
- Yalta yayla
- Nikita yayla
- Gurzuf yayla
- Babugan yayla
- Chatyr-Dag yayla
- Dologorukovskaya (Subatkan) yayla
- Demirci yayla
- Qarabiy yayla

=== Highest peaks ===
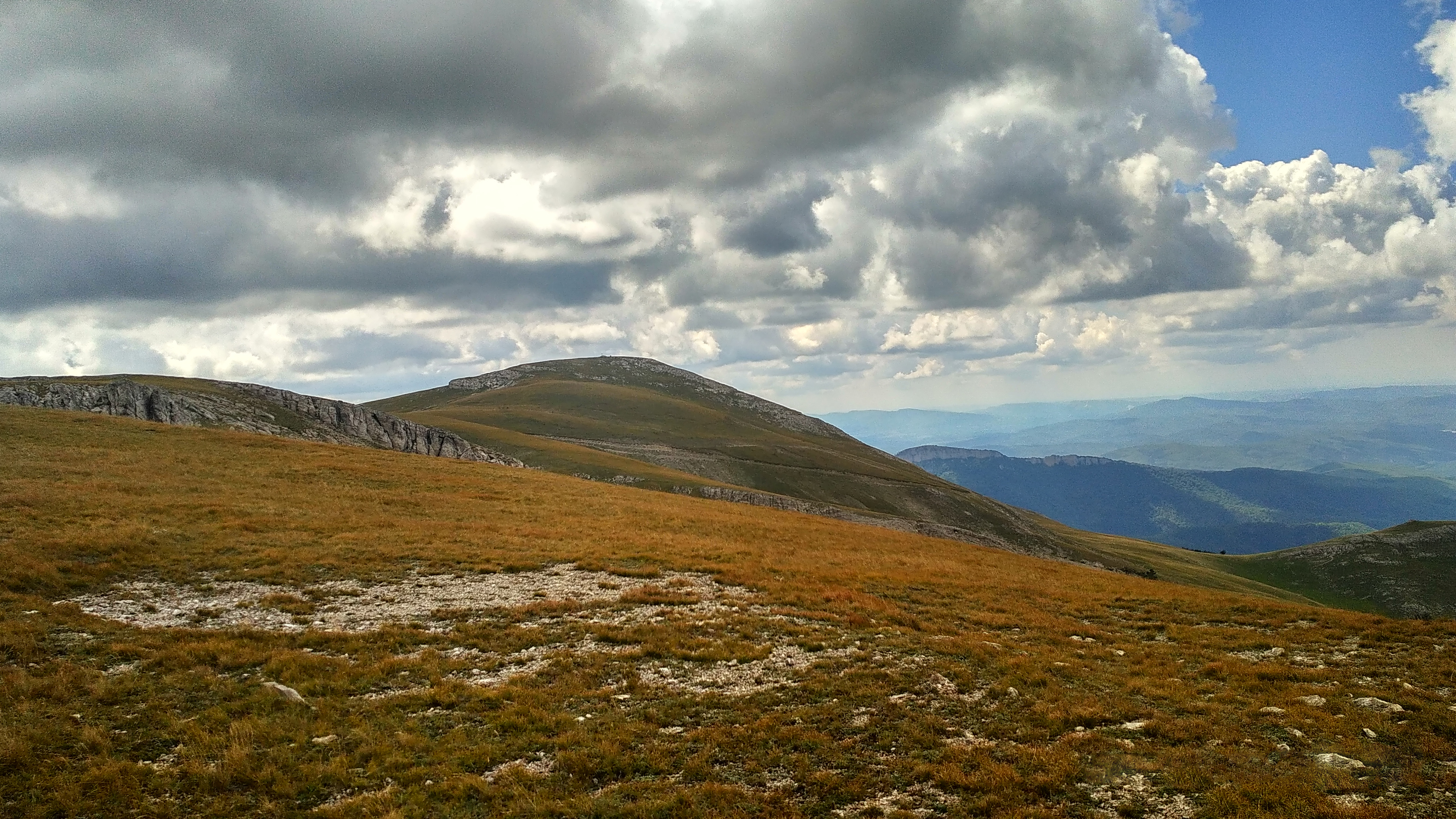
Summit of Roman-Kosh

Crimea's highest peak is the Roman-Kosh on the Babugan Yayla at 1,545 metres (5,069 ft). Other important peaks over 1,200 metres include:

- Demir-Kapu (Ukrainian: Демір-Капу, Russian: Демир-Капу, Crimean Tatar: Demir Qapı) 1,540 m in the Babugan Yayla;
- Zeytin-Kosh (Ukrainian: Зейтин-Кош; Russian: Зейтин-Кош, Crimean Tatar: Zeytün Qoş) 1,537 m in the Babugan Yayla;
- Kemal-Egerek (Ukrainian: Кемаль-Егерек, Russian: Кемаль-Эгерек, Crimean Tatar: Kemal Egerek) 1,529 m in the Babugan Yayla;
- Eklizi-Burun (Ukrainian: Еклізі-Бурун, Russian: Эклизи-Бурун, Crimean Tatar: Eklizi Burun) 1,527 m in the Chatyrdag Yayla;
- Lapata (Ukrainian: Лапата; Russian: Лапата, Crimean Tatar: Lapata) 1,406 m in the Yaltynska Yayla, Yalta Yaylası;
- Northern Demirji (Ukrainian: Північний Демірджі, Russian: Северный Демирджи, Crimean Tatar: Şimaliy Demirci) 1,356 m in the Demirci Yayla;
- Ai-Petri (Ukrainian: Ай-Петрі, Russian: Ай-Петри, Crimean Tatar: Ay Petri) 1,234 m in the Ay Petri Yaylası.

== Geology ==
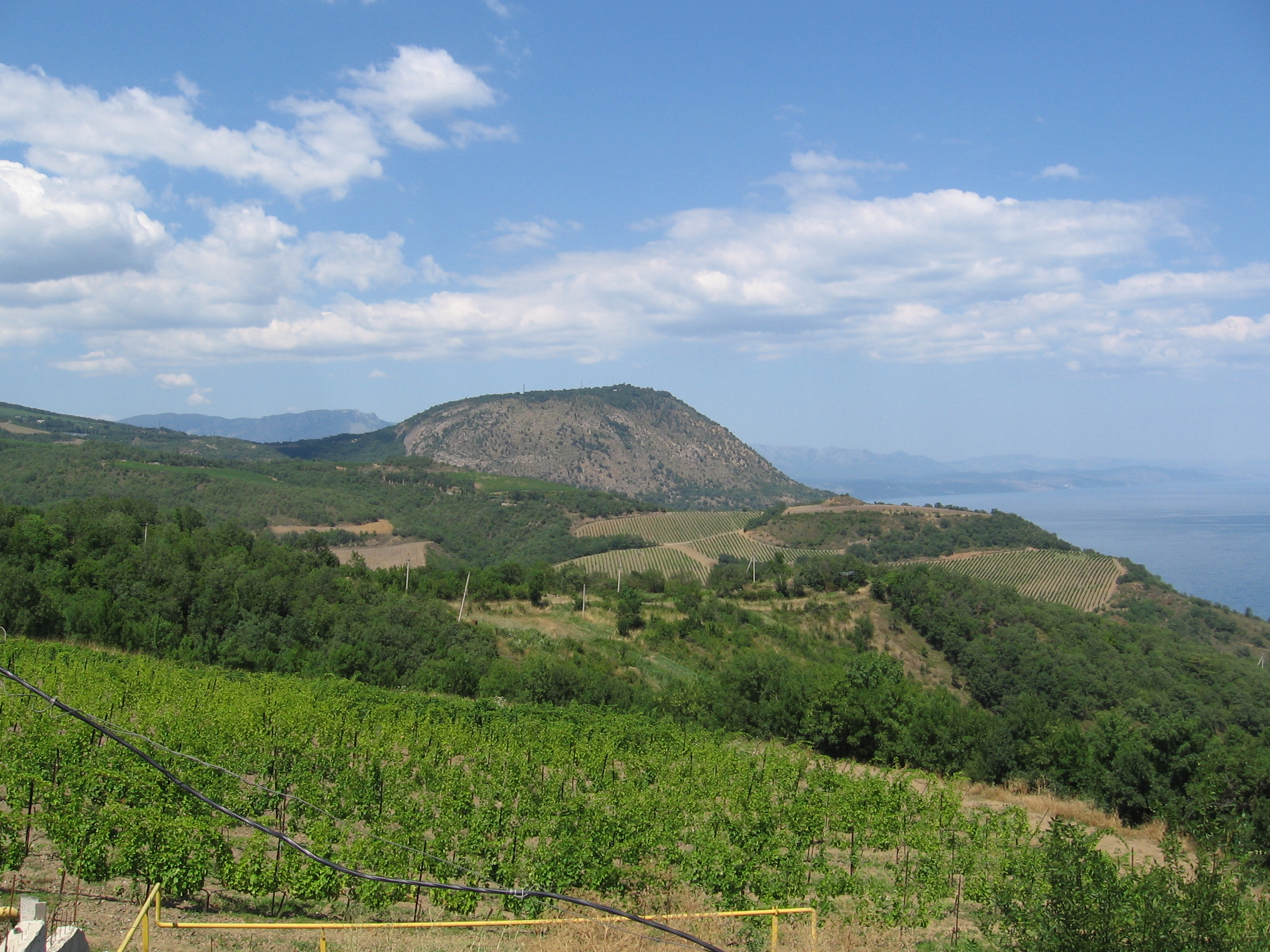
Mount Qastel near Alushta

Crimean Mountains form a continuous anticline, the southern end of which emerges from the sea. Their formation started during the Jurassic period and continued during Early Cretaceous, with the main part of the process taking place in Miocene and Pliocene. The southern side of the range continued submerging during the Quaternary period and became a site of volcanic activity. Tectonic processes continue in the area to our day, most recently demonstrated by the 1927 Crimean earthquakes. Crimean Mountains are formed mainly of sedimental rock of marine origin, including sandstones, slates and limestones interspersed with diorites and porphyrites.

== Landscape ==
The two lower northern ranges of the Crimean Mountains are cuestas characterized with gentle northern and steep southern slopes. The outer range reaches a height of 342 meters above sea level and consists of Neogene limestone and sandstone. The inner range, reaching heights of 550-730 meters, is built from limestone on a marl base. The cuestas are accompanied by detached mesa hills formed as a result of denudation. Both ranges are dissected by deep valleys and canyons. A broad valley reaching the width of 3-4 kilometers separates the two ranges and contains the highway and railway connecting Simferopol and Sevastopol. Another valley, adjoining the former one in the east, runs on the southern side of the middle range.

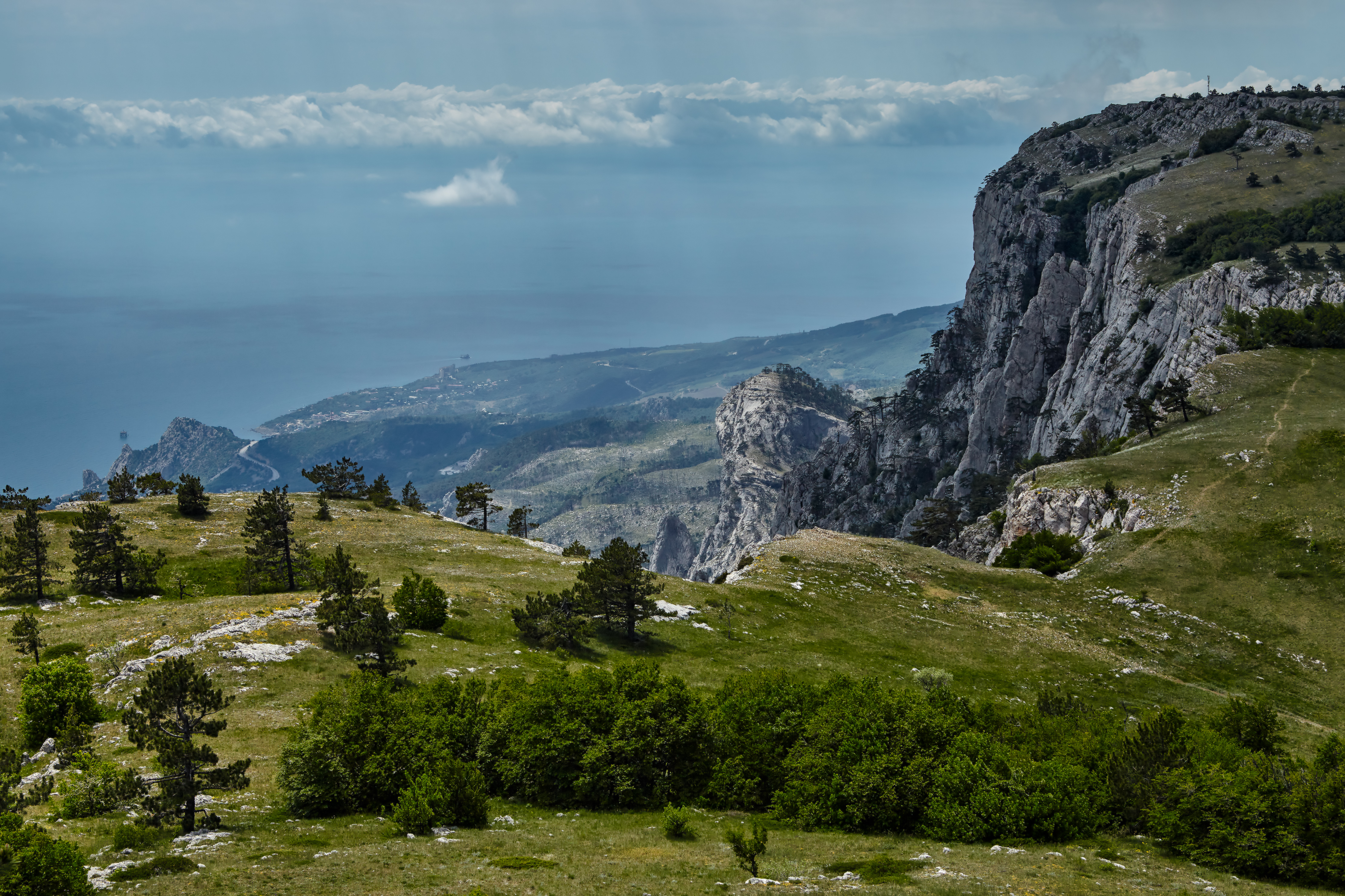
View of the Southern Coast from Ay-Petri Yayla

The highest range, the Yayla, consists of Jurassic limestone and forms a plateau steeply falling on the southern side. Its lower eastern part is separated in numerous ranges and heavily eroded. The easternmost plateau-like massif of Crimean Mountains is Mount Agarmysh (723 m). The Yayla is characterized with the presence of karst phenomena of Mediterranean type: limestone pavements, numerous sinkholes and caves (most notably in the Chatyr-Dag massif). The surface of the Yayla is dry as a result of atmospheric precipitation infiltrating the limestone base, creating underground lakes and rivers. The edges of the range are dissected with deep canyons. In the western part of Yayla its southern slope drops directly into the sea, meanwhile to the east of Foros the distance between the mountains and the sea reaches several kilometers.

=== Passes and rivers ===
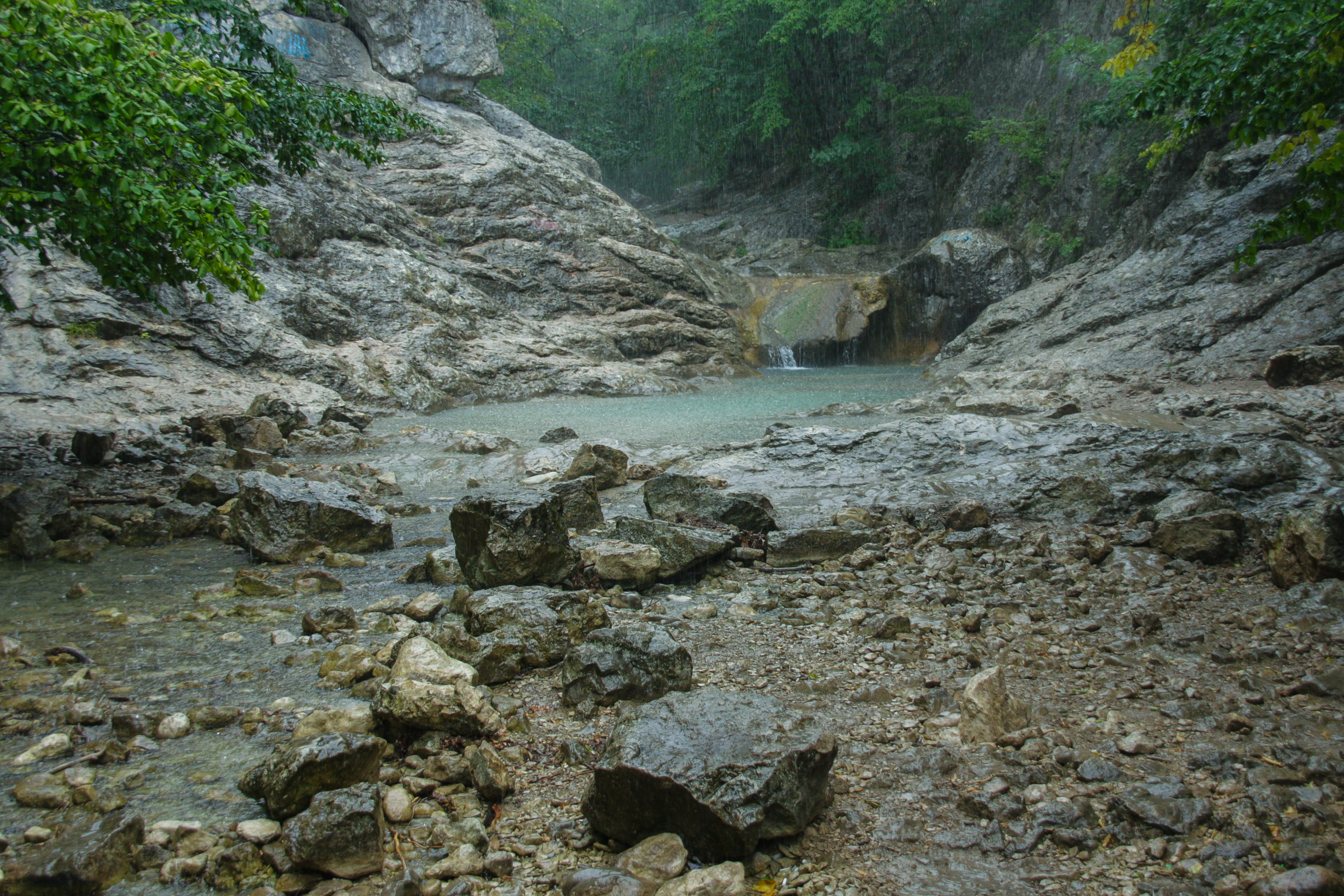
Grand Canyon

The passes over the Crimean Mountains are (from east to west):

- Angarskyi Pass (752m) near Perevalne, on a road from Alushta to Simferopol
- Okhotnyche (1185m) near Ai-Petri mountain peak, on the road from Yalta to Bakhchysarai
- Baydar Gate (503m) near Foros, connecting Baydar Valley and the sea coast
- Laspi Pass (350m) near Cape Aya, on a road from Yalta to Sevastopol.

Rivers of the Crimean Mountains include the Alma River, Chernaya River, and Salhir River on the northern slope and Uchan-su River on the southern slope which forms the Uchan-su waterfall, and the highest waterfall in Crimea.

== Nature ==
=== Climate ===
The highest part of the mountains above 1,200 meters has an average annual temperature of 5.7 degrees Celsius (15.7 in July, -4.2 in January). Annual precipitation varies from 1,000-1,200 millimeters in the western part to 510-700 millimeters in the east. Local climate strongly depends on the height, relief and exposure of the particular area. The soil consists of brown earth, transitioning into Subalpine meadow earths in elevated areas and subtropical Ultisols on the Southern Coast. The foothills of Crimean Mountains have a humid continental climate and contain low-humus chernozem soils.

=== Flora ===
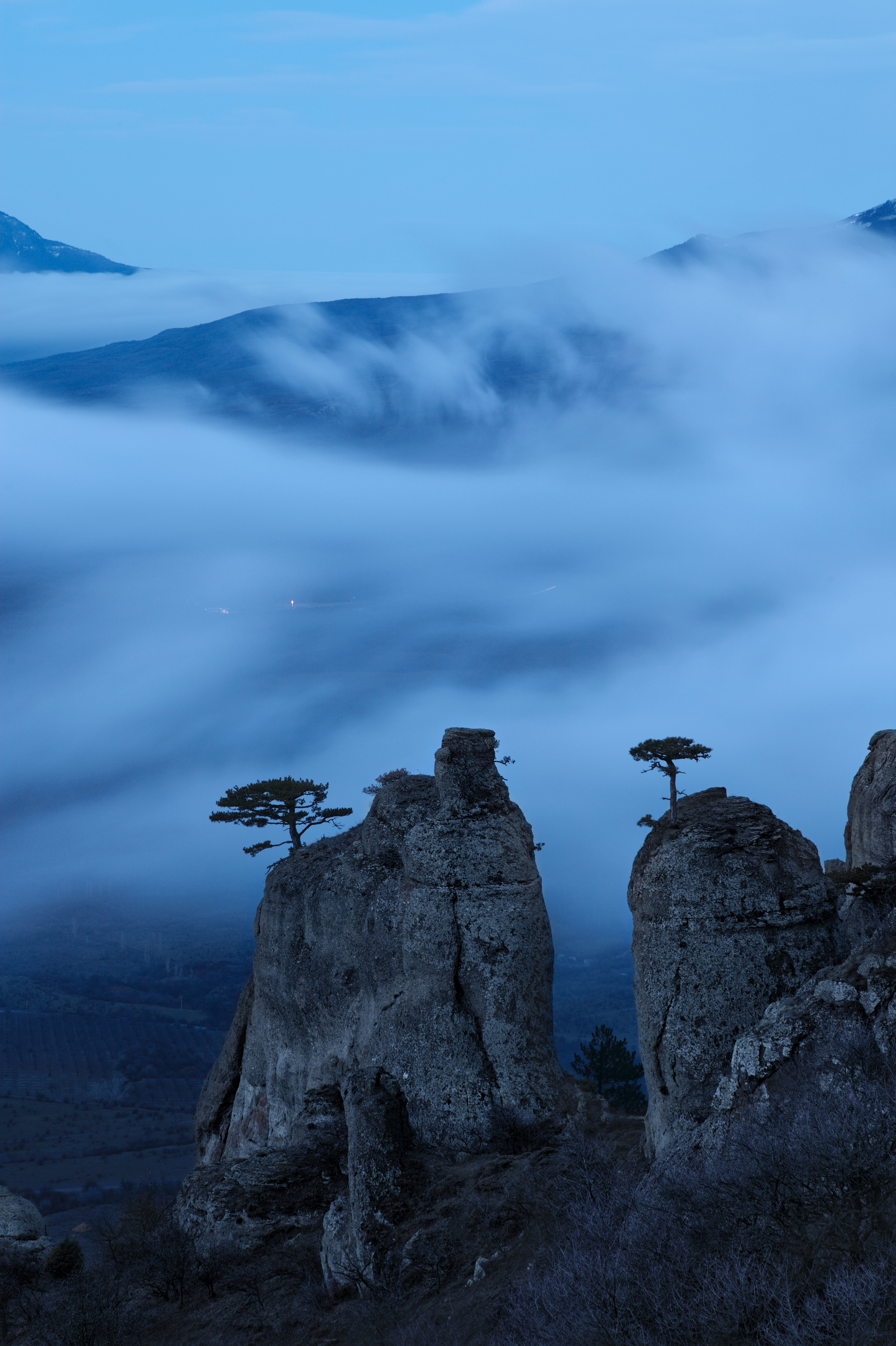
Twilight on Demirci yayla

The flora of Crimean Mountains varies between the northern and southern slopes. In the northern foothills, a forest steppe landscape with small oak, hornbeam and other groves dominates. The heights below 600-700 meters are covered with oak forests (Quercus pubescens in lower areas, Quercus petraea in more elevated locations). The zone between 700 and 1300 meters above sea level contain beech forests with additional presence of hornbeam, lime, maple, ashberry and yew, along with dwarf mountain pine and Crimean pine in uppermost areas.

The southern slopes of the mountains have a Mediterranean climate with plants typical for that climatic zone. Oak and pine forests dominate the heights between 300-500 and 800-900 meters above sea level, with beech forest with admixture of pine, hornbeam, maple and other plants covering areas above the latter line. Oak is the most widespread plant of the Crimean Mountains, covering over half of their forested area.

The upper part of Crimean Mountains consists of a treeless plateau covered with montane meadows and juniper shrubs. Grasses growing in the area include Volga fescue, bromes, junegrasses, Phleum phleoides, feather grass, clover, viola, Ocimum and edelweiss. Historical use of Yayla ridges as pasturing ground led to significant damage for the local plant world. The lower northern ridges of the Crimean Mountains, as well as the valley separating them, are deforested and covered with cultivated land. The highest range and the upper valley separating it from the north are dominated by forests.

=== Fauna ===
The fauna of Crimean Mountains and their foothills is typical for the Mediterranean Biogeographic Region and contains a number of endemic species. Areas with the richest wildlife are located in the northern parts of the Yayla, including the lands of the Crimean Nature Reserve. Local fauna includes deer, marten, shrew, jays, tit, bunting, black vulture, common blackbird, common rock thrush, honey buzzard, european ratsnake, smooth snake. Among species introduced into the area are wild sheep and red squirrel. The Southern Coast is populated by species such as Kotschy's gecko, Darevskia saxicola, cicada, praying mantis , scolopendra, Crimean scorpion, Carabus, Solifugae, molluscs and mosquitoes.

== Archeology ==
Archaeologists have found the earliest anatomically modern humans in Europe in the Crimean Mountains' Buran-Kaya caves. The fossils are 32,000 years old, with the artifacts linked to the Gravettian culture. The fossils have cut marks suggesting a post-mortem defleshing ritual.

== Gallery ==
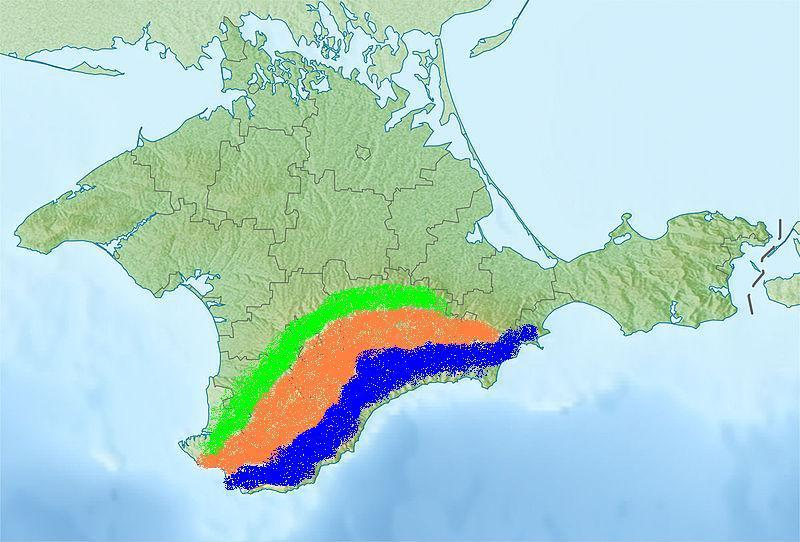
Three ranges composing the Crimean Mountains

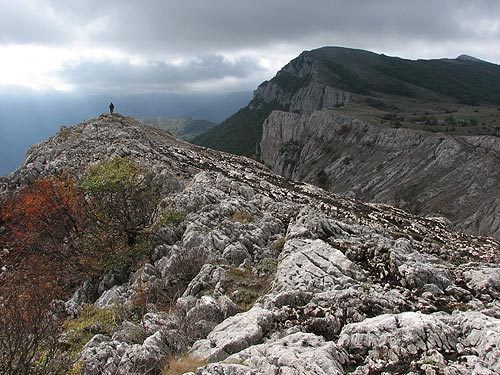
Qarabiy yayla

Mountain plateau of Chatyr-Dag mountain

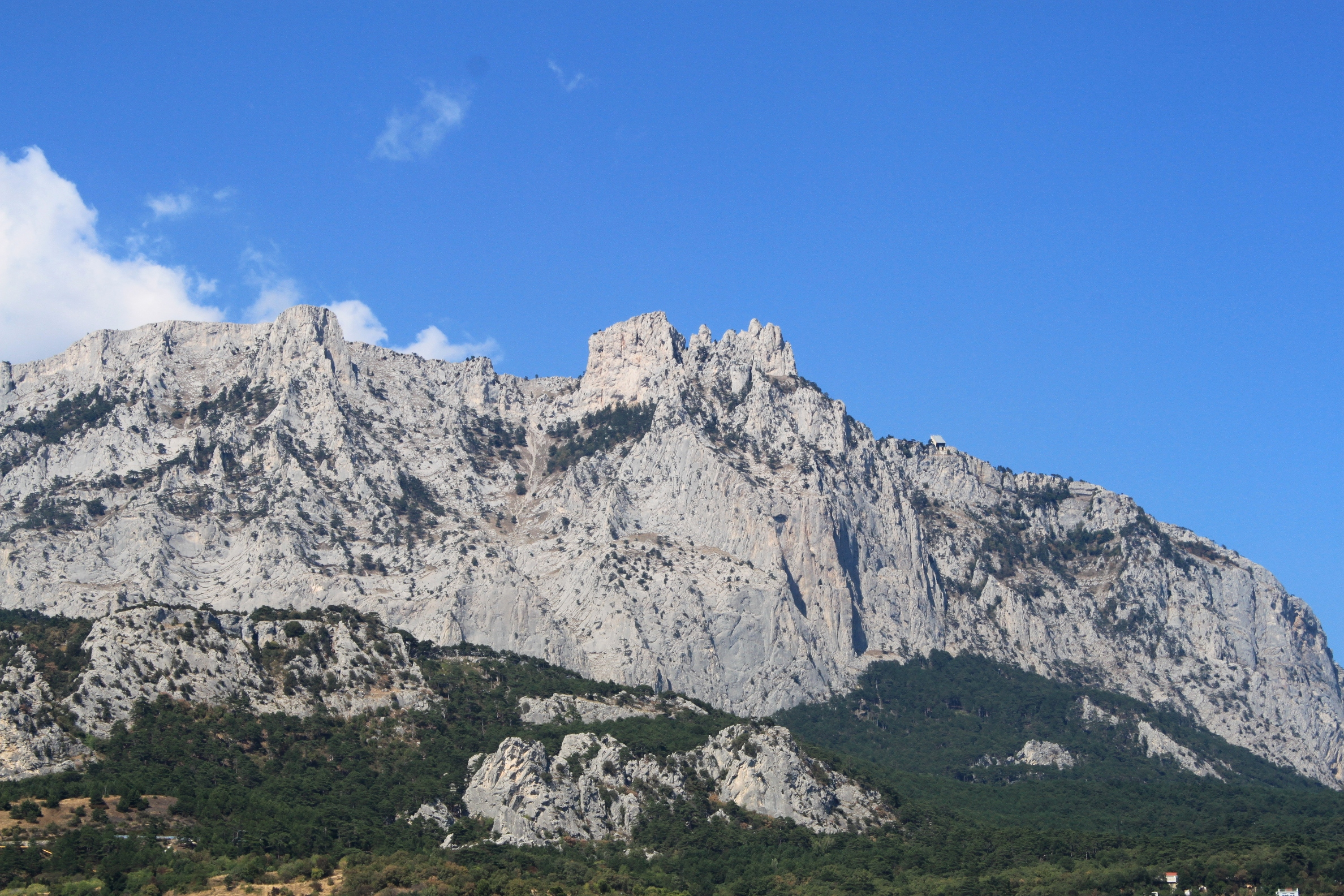
Southern face of Ay-Petri

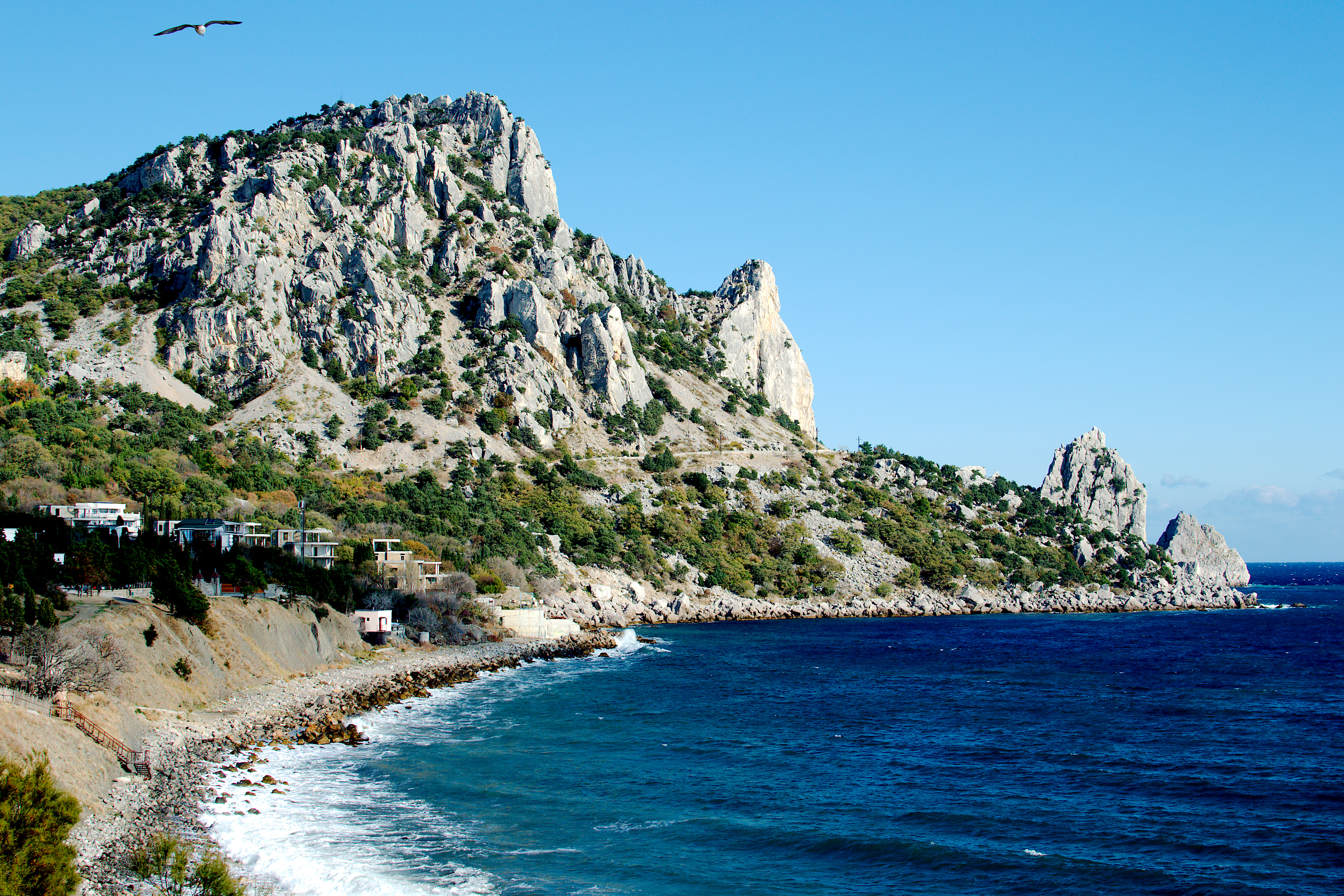
Mount Koshka

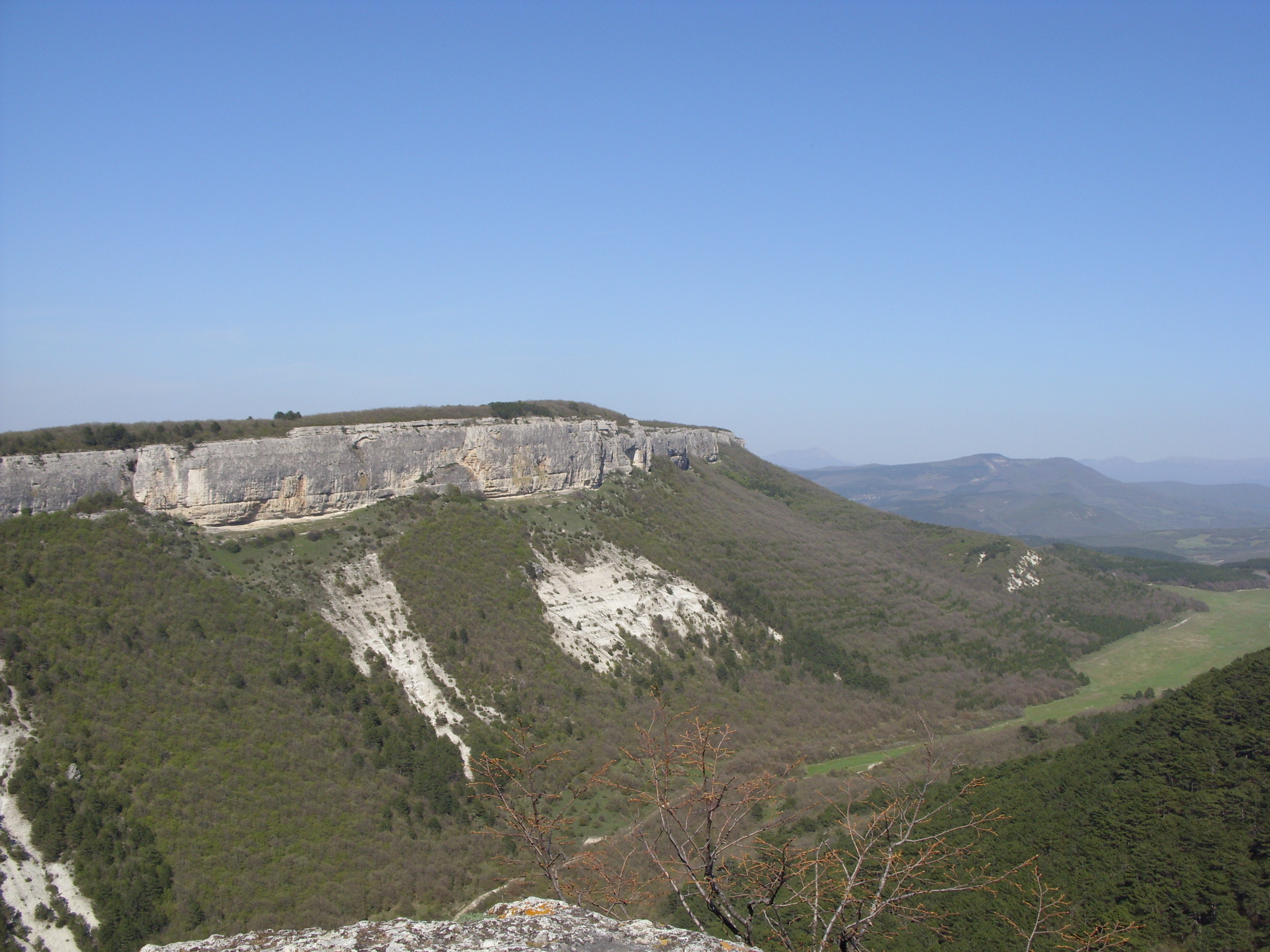
Mesa formations in Crimean Mountains

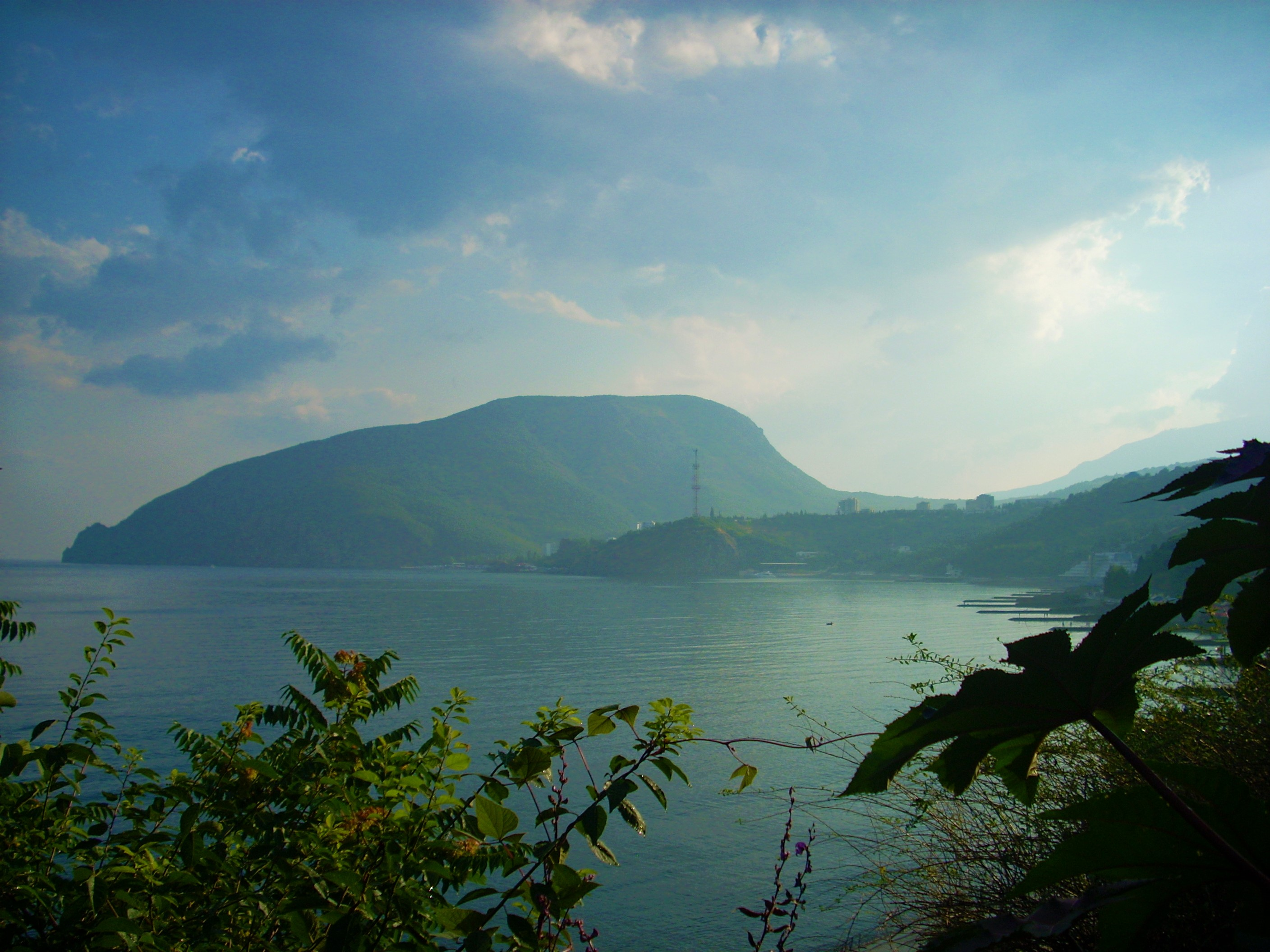
Ayu-Dag Mountain

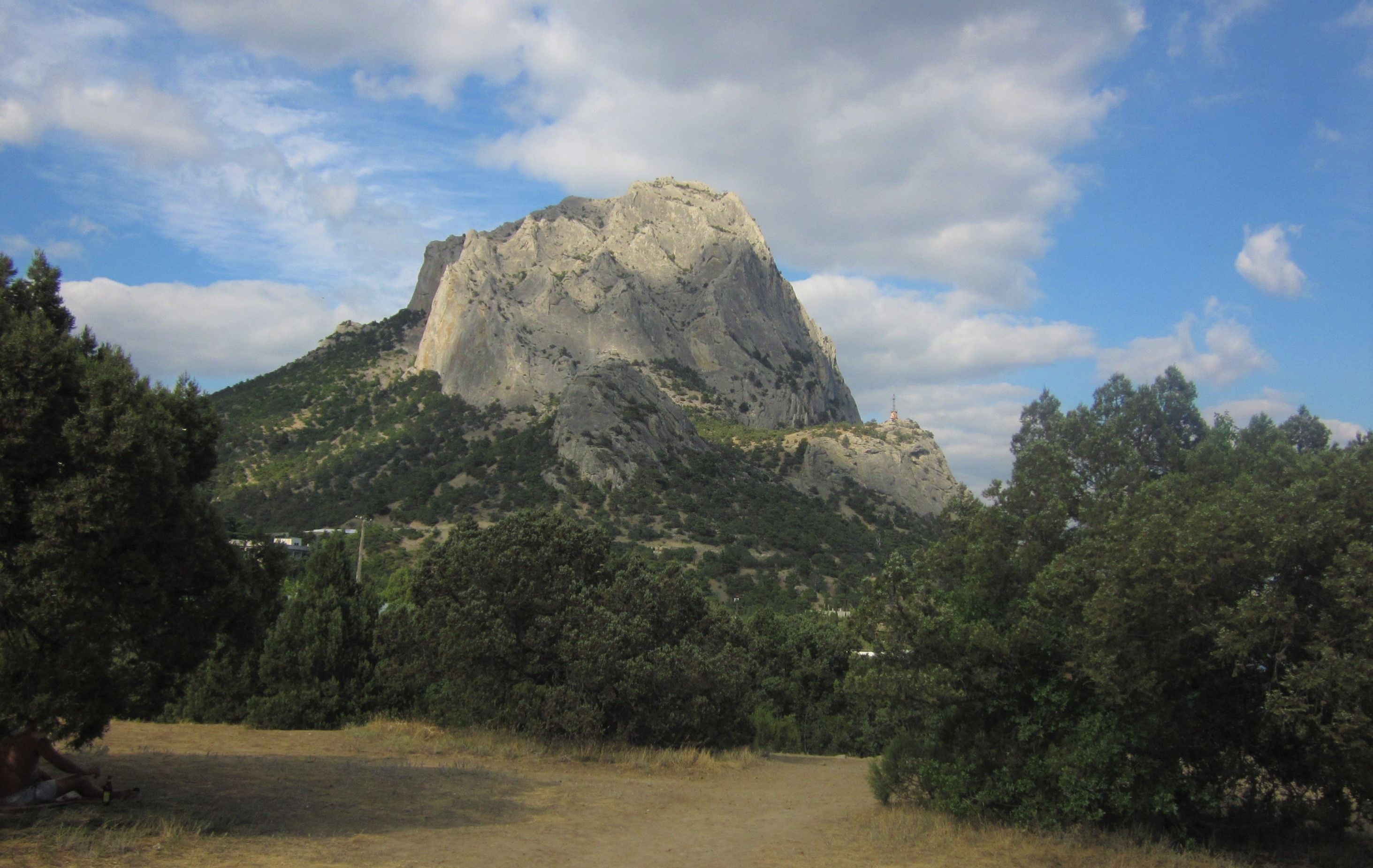
Sokil/Sokol Mountain near Novyi Svit

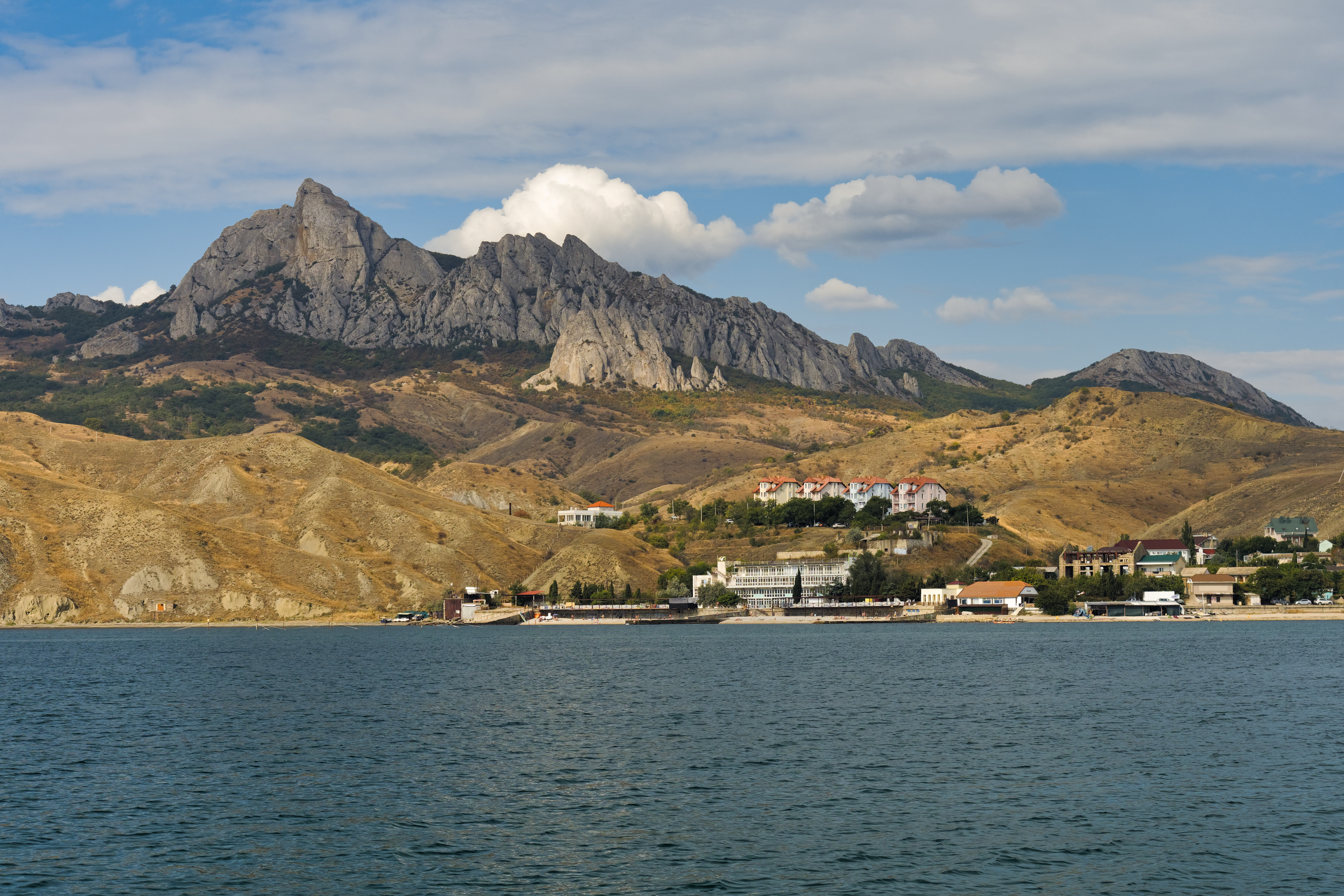
Kara Dag Mountain near Koktebel

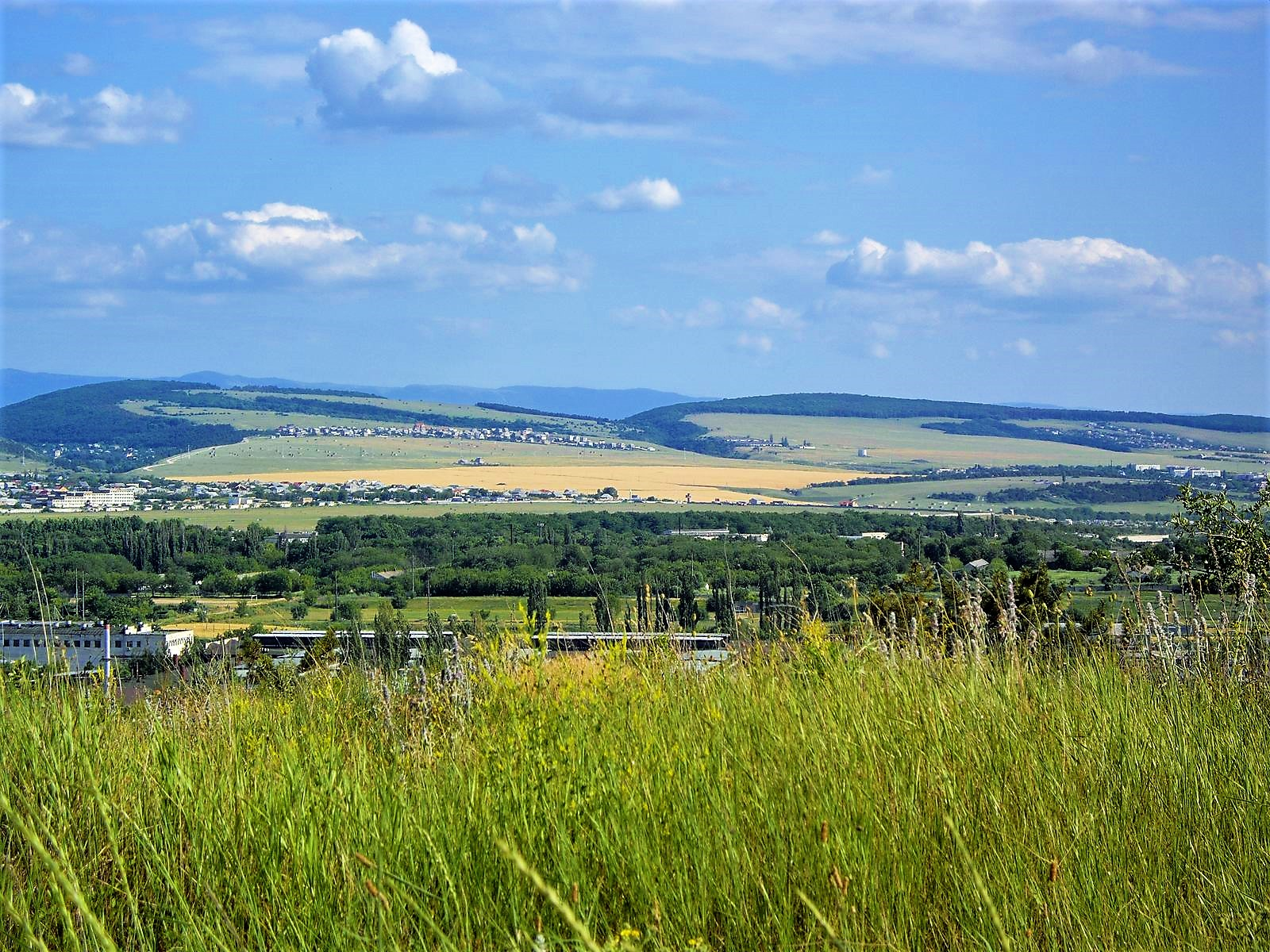
Outer ranges of the Crimean Mountains
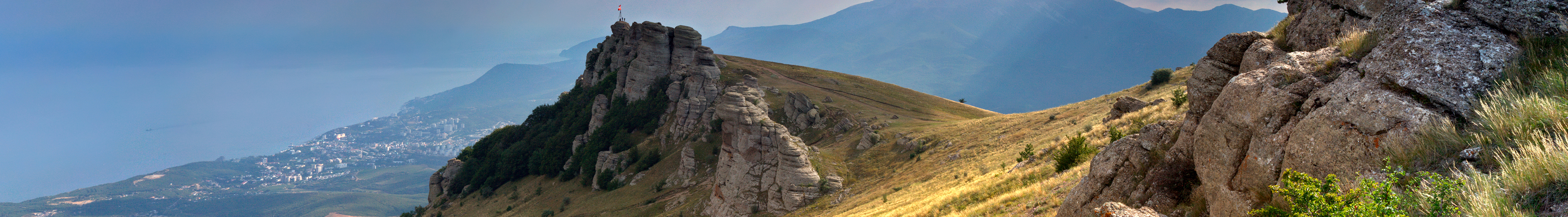
View on Alushta and Roman-Kosh from Southern Demirci

== See also ==
- Tepe-Kermen
- Perchem
- Yuke-Tepe (1025)
