= Demir-Kapu =

Mountain in Crimea

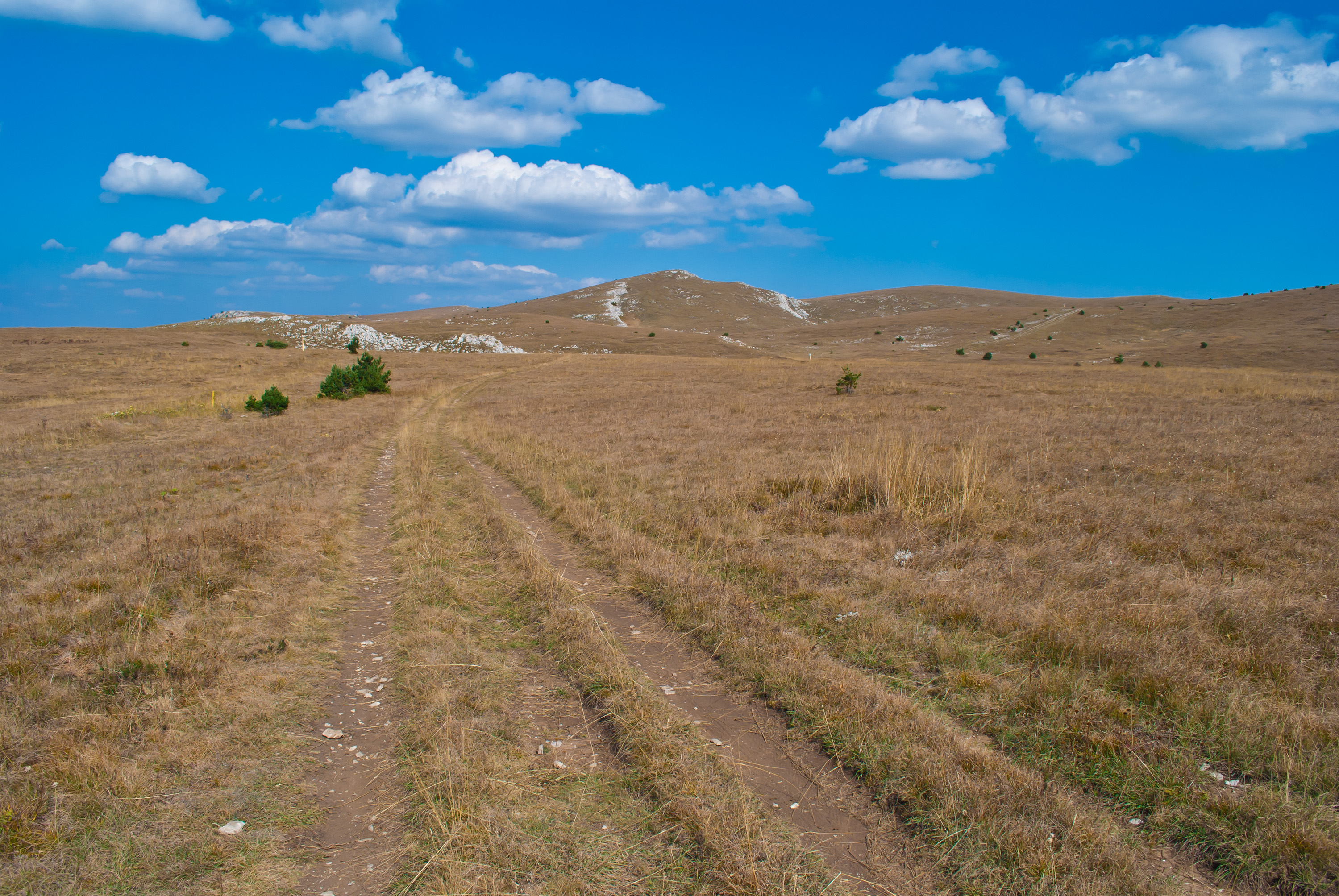

Highest point
- Elevation: 1,540 m (5,050 ft)
- Coordinates: 44°35′06″N 34°12′26″E

Geography
- Location within Crimea
- Country: Ukraine
- Parent range: Crimean Mountains

Demir-Kapu (Ukrainian: Демір-Капу; Crimean Tatar: Demir Qapı) is the second highest mountain of the Crimean Mountains. Its height stands 1540 meters above sea level.
