= Perchem =

Mountain massif in Crimea

Coordinates: 44°51′30″N 34°55′45″E

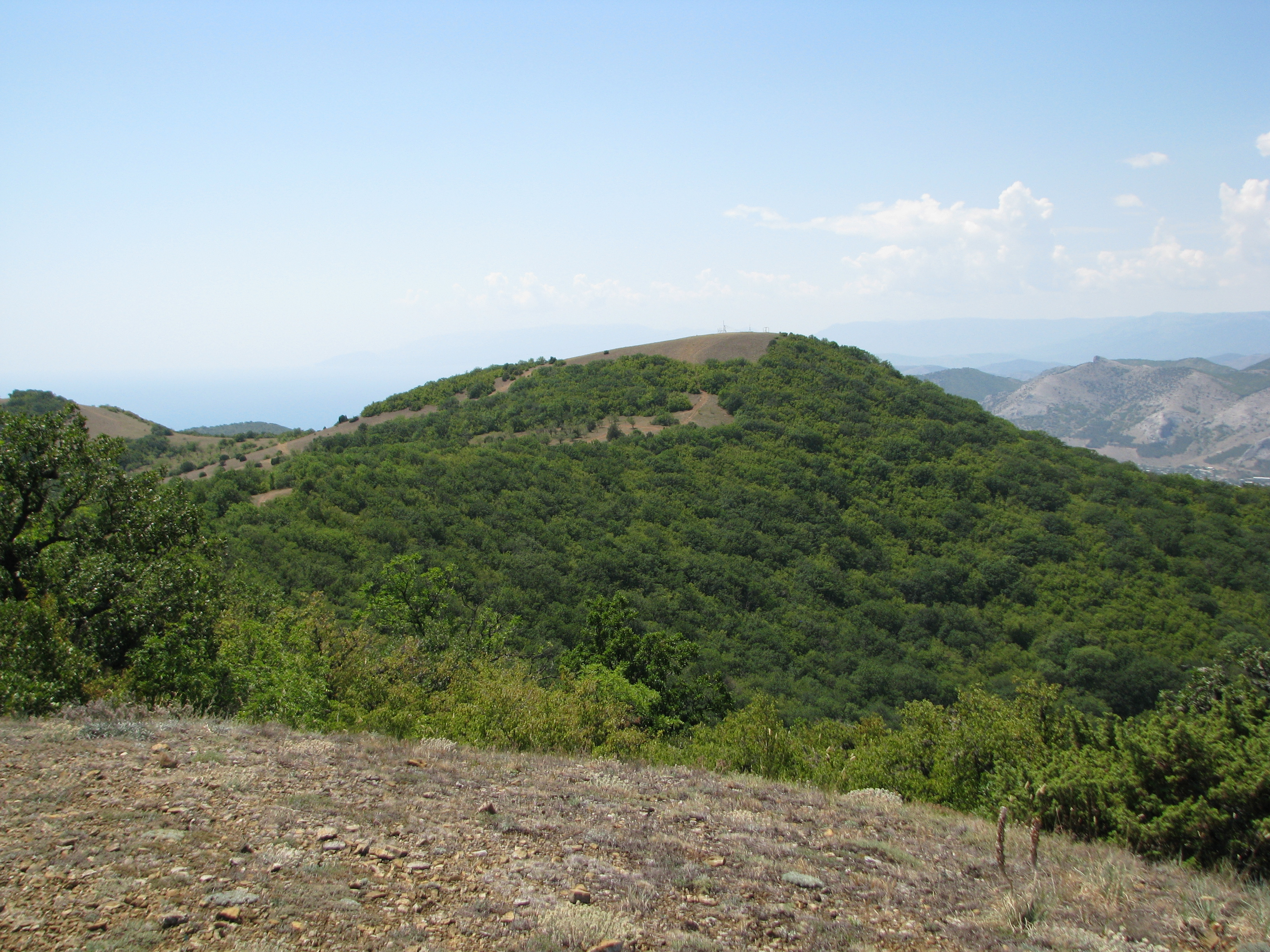
- The main summit (576.7 m) and the saddle of the Perchem massif from the summit of 571.6 m

Highest point
- Listing: Mountains of Ukraine

Geography
- Location within Crimea
- Location: Crimea
- Parent range: Crimean Mountains

Perchem (Perchem-Kaya, Perchem-Oba, Ukrainian: Перчем; Crimean Tatar: Perçem, Перчем) is a mountain massif located in Crimea. It bounds the Sudak valley from the west and stretches from northeast to southwest. The massif consists of a main peak, which stands at 576.7 metres, and several smaller, dome-shaped peaks. Since 1972, the northeastern slope of the massif in the USSR, Ukraine, and later in Russia has been designated as a specially protected natural area. It is known as the Park-Monument of Garden and Park Art. This area is of regional importance in the Republic of Crimea and is referred to as the 'Perchem Urban Forest'.

== Etymology ==
"Perchem" translates from the Crimean Tatar language to mean "fringes". The tops of the massif still have a wooded cover, while steppe glades can be found at the summit and southern spurs of the Shibliak. The words "къая" (qaya) and "оба" (oba) are translated as "rock" and "hill" respectively.

== Geology and geography ==
The Sudak and Novyi Svit mountains consist of robust organic limestone formed by colonies of corals, sponges, bryozoans, and lime-emitting algae that lived in a clear, warm sea at a depth of no more than 40-50 metres. During the Late Jurassic era, around 130-150 million years ago, corals extracted calcium from seawater, died off, and a new generation developed on their remains. This process led to the formation of rocky uplifts in shallow waters around the islands of present-day Sudak and Novyi Svit. The resulting reefs demonstrate the natural progression of geological formations over time. After the Tethys Ocean receded from the rudiment of the Crimean Mountains, they were covered with clays. Subsequently, the covering clays eroded, and the massifs of limestone appeared on the surface in the form of isolated mountains. The Main Ridge, stretching from Cape Aya in the west to Chatyr-Dag and Qarabiy yayla in the east, contains the remains of a large barrier reef that once existed on the northern edge of the Tethys Ocean. The reefs located in Sudak and Novyi Svit are highly expressive and should be considered a 'reserve of fossil reefs' on the southern coast of Crimea.

The special properties of local limestones can be explained by the formation of the Sudak and Novyi Svit mountains. In porous reefs washed with water, the dissolved calcium carbonate from the skeletons of reef-builders is deposited in the voids, strengthening the coral-algae structure. As a result, fossil reefs are transformed into hard marbleised limestones rather than loose structures. The fossils and calcite crystals can be polished to a lustrous shine, making them a beautiful decorative stone due to their intricate shapes. Reef massifs are characterized by their formation subsequent to sinking areas of the seabed. As a result, the thickness of reef massifs can reach many hundreds of metres, such as the Sokol mountain which has a thickness of 300-350 m, many times greater than the depth of the reef. Powerful reefs are formed when the rate of seabed sinking corresponds approximately to the rate of reef growth over a long period of time. On the southern slopes, there are outcrops of igneous intrusions known as dikes. Although the massif underwent erosion, karst processes are weaker in this area than in others.

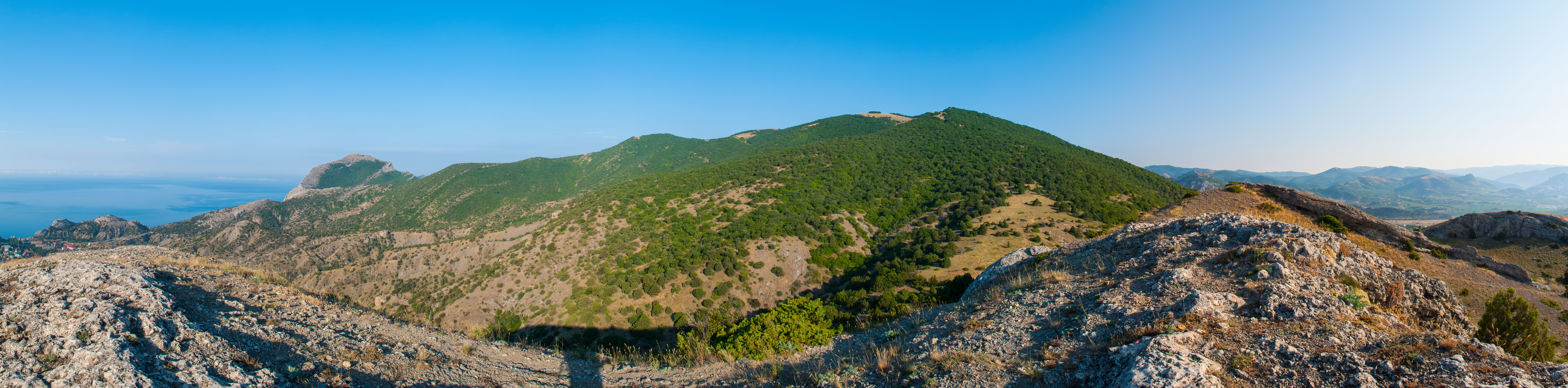
Perchem-Oba massif, seen from the east from Mount Lysaya. Peak 571.6, second from the right, 576.7 (partly treeless), third from the right, appears to be lower because of the distance, Kush-Kaya (Sokol) peak is visible on the left, lower left Palvany-Oba (Bolvan).

The massif is a ridge with a main peak (576.7 m) and a slightly smaller peak to the north-east (571.6 m), between which there is a gentle saddle. It is separated from the Syht-Lar to the south-west and the Kalamat-Kaya to the north by a deep valley, along which the Alushta-Sudak-Feodosia road now runs to the north of the massif. In Russia it is designated 35К-005, in Ukraine - P-29. Erosion processes have also separated the ancient Sokol and Krepostnaya reefs in the south from Perchem. The foothills of the Perchem massif are cut by deep ravines without permanent watercourses.

Located at the eastern foot of Mount Perchem, on the border of the Sudak State Enterprise vineyards, is a sulphur spring. The water is sulphate-hydrocarbonate-sodium with a mineralisation range of 0.82 to 0.93 g/l and contains significant amounts of hydrogen sulphide, iodine, bromine, and other trace elements. The water is renowned for its healing properties. In 1830 A. Bode wrote that "... the spring could bring great relief to many sick people". In 1834, Charles Montandon, in the pages of the first guide to the Crimea, noted that people came here from far and wide and that "... the treatment often gives positive results". Nowadays, the water of the sulphur spring is supplied to the TEC "Sudak" for therapeutic purposes.

== History ==
External images
- Intrusion (dike) on the southern slopes of Perchem
- Uncut millstone blanks in the Perchem quarry

At the end of the 18th century, Peter Pallas discovered quarries still in operation near the western spurs of Perchem. Dense sandstone was extracted from these quarries to make millstones and other products.

In 1927, Academician Yuri Gautier led an expedition to Sudak to conduct archaeological research on the Sudak fortress and reconnaissance of numerous archaeological monuments in the Sudak valley and on the slopes of nearby mountains. During the expedition, the ruins of a temple on the southern slope of Mount Perchem were discovered by A. Fomin.

Further research was conducted in 1993-1994, revealing that the monastery located under the southern slope of the Perchem and Lysaya peaks was relatively better preserved than other cloisters in the Sudak valley. The complex covered an area of 215 square metres and comprised a temple, an inner household courtyard, and a dwelling - a cell that also served as a refectory. Archaeologists discovered several burials in front of the temple entrance. The temple building is a double-apsed structure with an entrance hall on its western façade. The style of construction suggests that the Byzantines may have been influenced by the architectural traditions of the Armenians. The temple was reconstructed in the XIII-XIV centuries, and the remaining building exhibits evidence of reconstruction after a fire almost completely destroyed the original structure. The monastery dates back to the 8th century and was abandoned in the 15th century, likely due to the Turkish invasion of 1475. It slowly deteriorated over the following centuries. In 1993, during excavations, a fresco with a pictorial frame was discovered on the wall near the entrance to the church. A fragment of the inscription on the fresco has been preserved: "...the Temple of the Great Martyr and Infallible Panteleimon was built from the foundations by the work of..." An inscription was also found on the plaster: "Lord, help Zacharias, presbyter and ... sealed ..." The lack of conservation and protection of excavated foundations is a significant issue as they are deteriorating rapidly.

Archaeologist V.G. Tour reports the existence of at least two additional unexcavated religious sites at Perchemie based on his reconnaissance.

=== Great Patriotic War ===
Smaller tactical groups were also deployed to support the 1942 Sudak landing operation. On 6 January 1942, the advance party of the 226th Mountain Rifle Regiment, consisting of 218 men, was landed in Novy Svet. The destroyer Sposobny facilitated the landing near Cape Chekanny (Chekanyn-Kaya). The paratroopers successfully infiltrated the enemy's rear without any hindrance. During an attack on the commandant's office in Novyi Svit, the commander and several fighters were killed. The remaining paratroopers retreated to Mount Perchem's forest. They kept watch over the Alushta-Sudak road until the main forces of the paratroopers arrived. Afterward, they were relieved of their duty and returned to Alchak.

German and Romanian troops held an observation post on Perchem. During the battle for the liberation of Sudak on 14 April 1944, the 979th Fighter Aviation Regiment pilots sank barges with retreating Germans and bombed an artillery battery on the slope of Mount Perchem. The advance party and infantry units, supported by tanks, entered the town of Sudak.

== Protected status ==
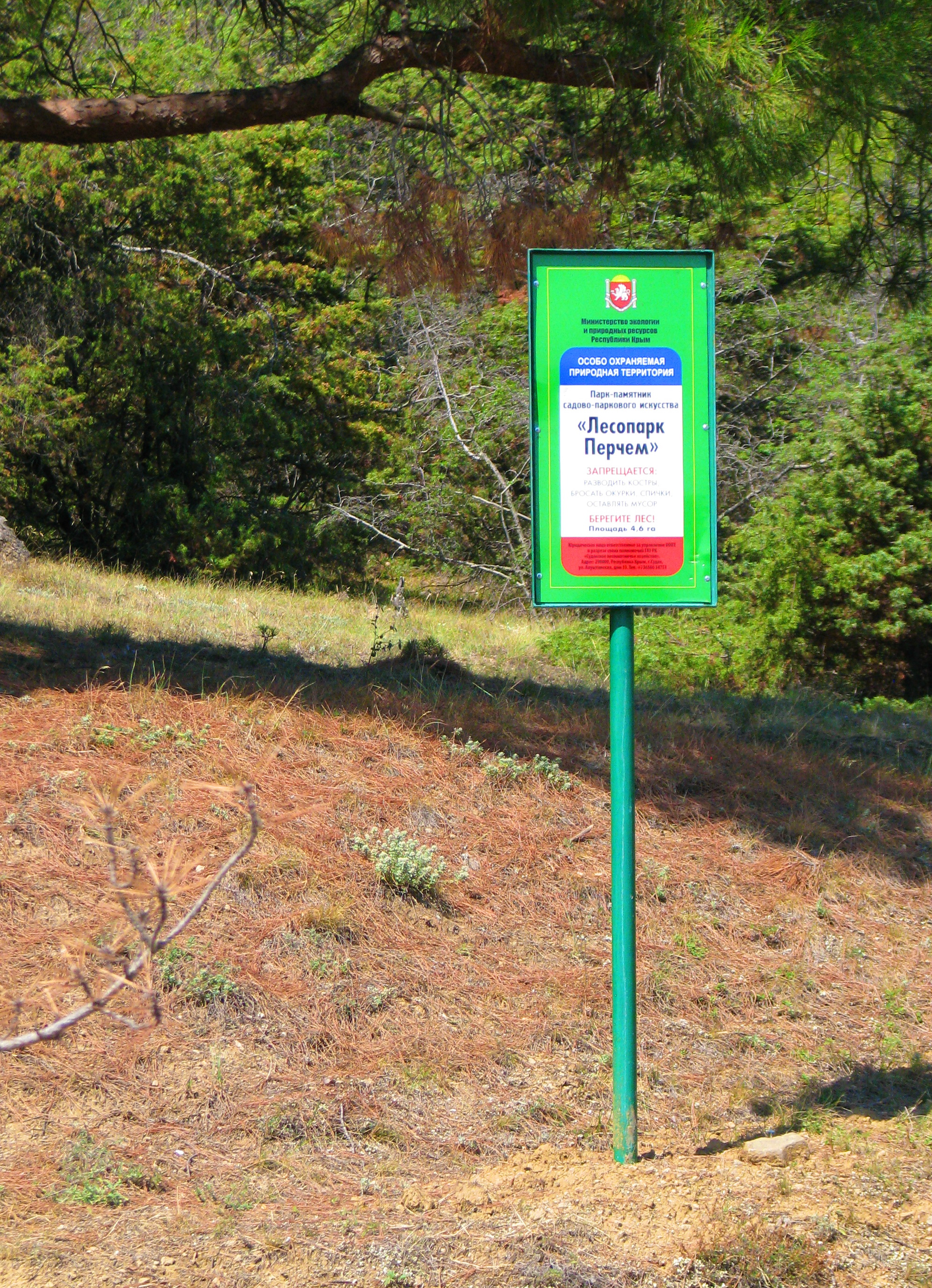
Perchem Urban Forest conservation plaque

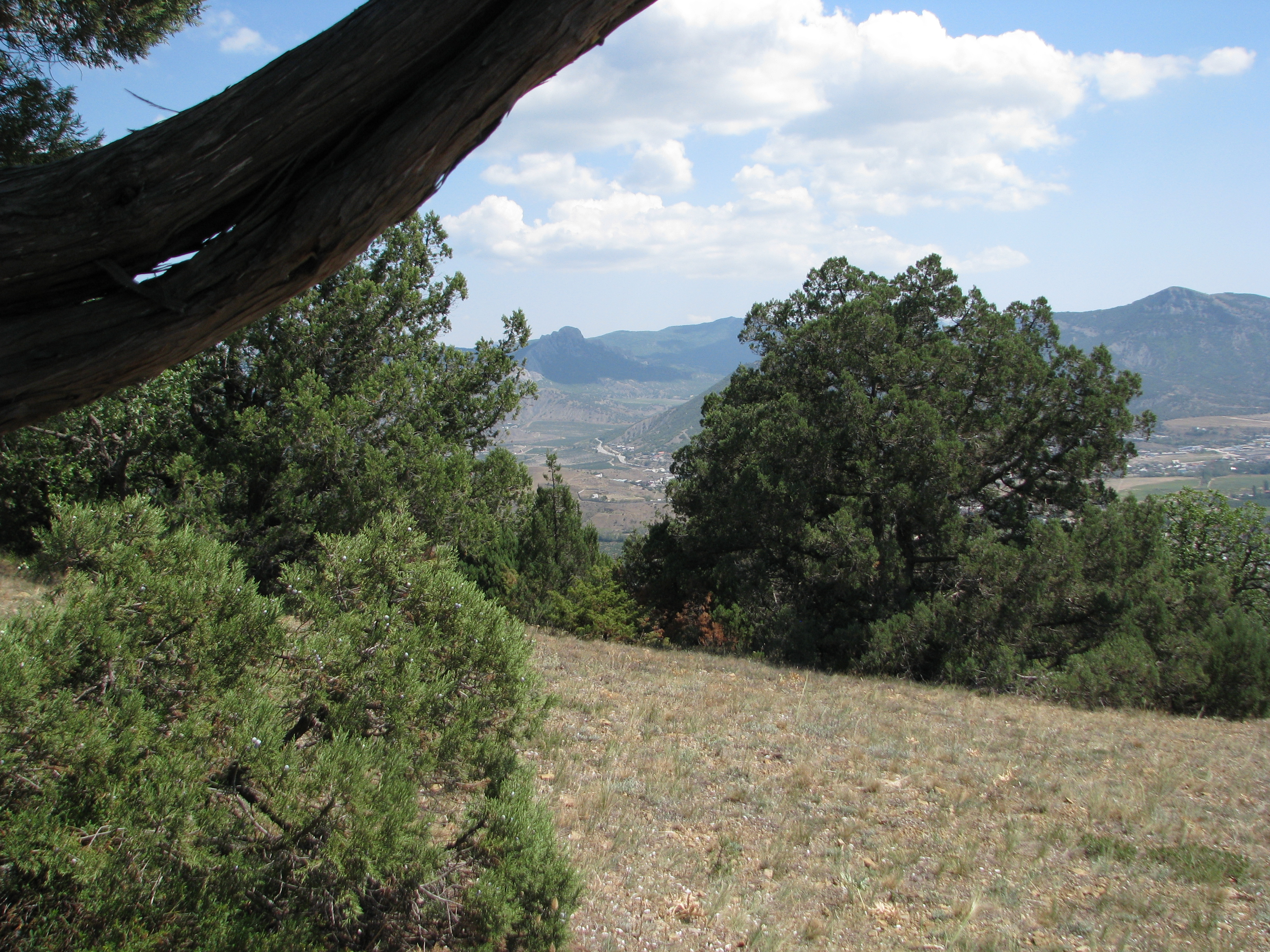
Greek juniper (Juniperus excelsa) on the eastern slopes of Perchem Photo by A. Trifonov

The Perchem massif includes a specially protected natural area in Russia known as the Park-Monument of Garden and Park Art. This area is of regional importance in the Republic of Crimea and is referred to as the 'Perchem Urban Forest'. The decision of the Executive Committee of the Crimean Regional Council of People's Deputies of 01.12.1972 No. 579 has been repeatedly reapproved in the Ukrainian SSR and Ukraine. After the annexation of Crimea by the Russian Federation, an Order of the Ministry of Ecology and Natural Resources of the Republic of Crimea No. 38 dated 17 January 2019 confirms this status. The park-monument is situated in the north-western part of Sudak city on the slope of Perchem-Kaya mountain. The protected area covers a total of 4.6 hectares, with one designated protected area.

The conservation objectives are to preserve the plantation of valuable tree and shrub species listed in the Red Data Books of the Russian Federation and the Republic of Crimea. These species include Pitsundian pine (Pinus pityusa Stev.), Crimean pine (Pinus pallasiana D. Don), Greek juniper (Jimiperus excelsa Bieb.), prickly juniper (Jimiperus oxycednis L.), and Atlas pistachio (Pistacia atlantica Desf). It also helps to conduct research on the valuable natural forest park landscapes, promote environmental education among the population, and advocate for the protection of the natural environment. The forest park can be used rationally for aesthetic, educational, scientific, environmental, and health-improving purposes.

== Mountain in culture ==
Although Koktebel was the primary destination for cultural figures in eastern Crimea during the early 20th century, Sudak also attracted creators. Sudak is the subject of a well-known poem by Mikhail Viktorovich Pomrening (pseudonym Dionis), dated 1929, which is dedicated to the events of the civil war in Crimea but written in the aesthetics of the Silver Age. The metaphor 'Cold Wind from Perchem' represents revolutionary change. Numerous unpublished works of the author have been preserved in the archive of poet Grigory Petnikov, which are now housed in the Literary and Art Museum of Old Crimea.

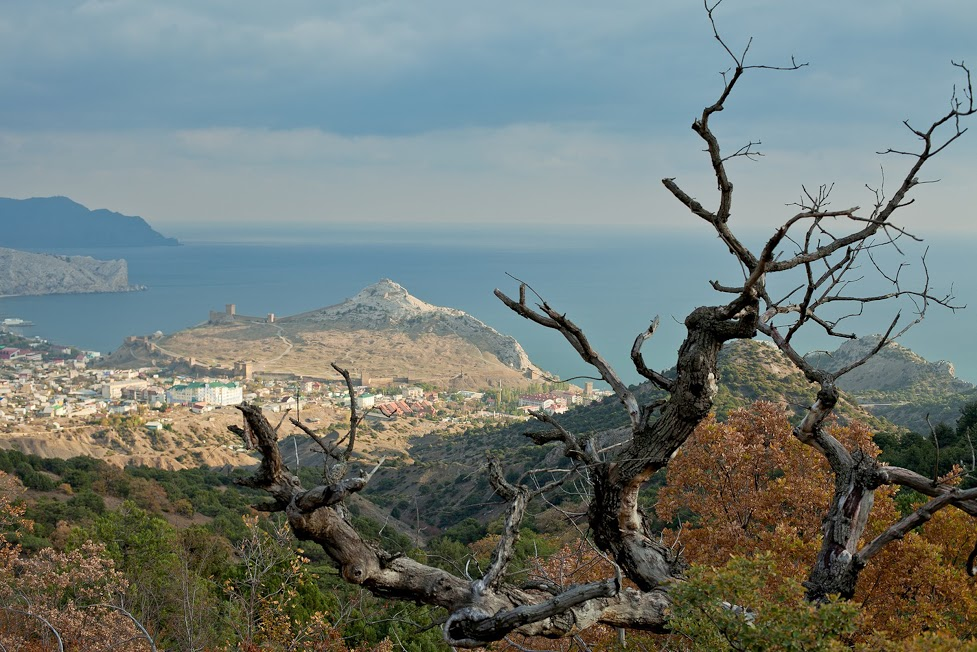
Southern spurs of the Perchem mountain, with Krepostnaya mountain in the background

:It's blowing in from Perchem. Has it burst?

The sea is like a frothy bowl.
Autumn in wheelbarrows, checkers on their heads,
And they fight in the gardens of Taraktash.
And the starry path is already narrow.
Above the emerald lamp of the lighthouse.

It's blowing in from Perchem. With a shroud
The herring plays and the horizon is torn,
And the young wine raves of the storm.
Hoping for the storm.
And at dawn, a horse, a ravening robber.
The ravening horse of Alim the bandit.

It's blowing from Perchem. Barking dogs.
The cold moon, the beginning of weddings.
The harmonica of the Bach's publication.
Insomnia, ruins and boredom.
And over me they murmur till morning.
Tight Cumans' winds.

— A.V. Pomrening, Sudak

Boris Chichibabin mentioned Perchem in the lines of "Sudak Elegies"

:For the first time, I don't know why,

I have climbed the woods of Percham.
Where the ashes of swords are embedded in the meagre depths,
Where from the heights of St George the monk
I looked at the mountains in their folds and shadows,
That Maximilian Voloshin painted....

== Bibliography ==
- Кириченко, Л.П.; Лебединский, В.И. (2002). Крым — музей под открытым небом (in Russian). Simferopol: Сонат. ISBN 966-7347-95-8.
- Варанов, И.Л.; Тур, В.Г. (1997). "Средневековый монастырь на г. Перчем // Археологические исследования в Крыму". Крымский филиал Института археологии НАН Украины. Simferopol: Сонат: 61–64.
- Тур, В.Г. (1997). "Монастырь на горе Перчем". Южногородские ведомости (1): 117–125.
- Тур, В.Г. (2005). "Византийский период иночества". Православные монастыри Крыма. Kyiv: Стилос. ISBN 966-8518-47-0.
- Тимиргазин, А.Д. (2004). Судак: Путешествие по историческим местам. Новый крымский путеводитель. Simferopol: Сонат. ISBN 966-7347-90-7.
- Чичибабин, Борис (2013). Избранные стихотворения. Школьная библиотека украинской и зарубежной литературы. Kharkiv: Фолио. ISBN 978-966-03-6648-0.
