= Crimean Nature Reserve =

Nature reserve in Ukraine

- Ukrainian: Кримський природний заповідник
- IUCN category Ia (strict nature reserve)
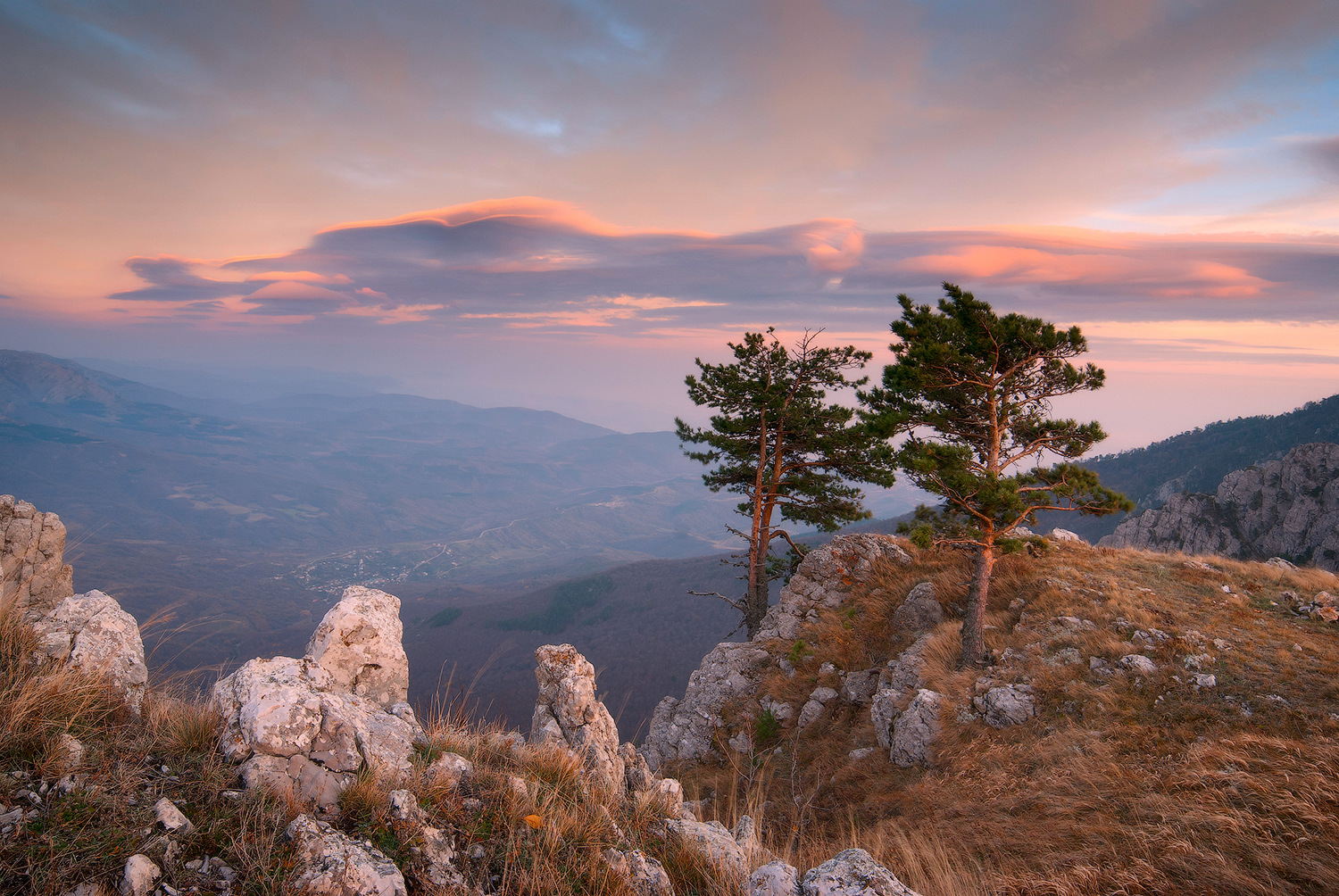
- Crimean Nature Reserve

- Location within Crimea
- Location: Ukraine
- Nearest city: Alushta
- Coordinates: 44°40′00″N 34°21′00″E
- Area: 44,175 hectares (109,159 acres; 442 km^{2}; 171 sq mi)
- Established: 1991
- Governing body: Territorial Administration in the Republic of Crimea
- Website: http://zapovednik-crimea.udprf-crimea.com/

The Crimean Nature Reserve (Ukrainian: Кримський природний заповідник) is a protected nature reserve that covers a portion of the Crimean Mountains, on the south coast of the Crimean Peninsula. The reserve protects mountain-forest and meadow steppe plants and animals, with a high level of biodiversity. It is located just north of the town of Massandra.

== Topography ==
The reserve lies on the main ridge of the Crimean Mountains along the southern edge of the Crimean Peninsula. The highest mountain in Crimea is in the reserve - Roman-Kosh at 1,545 metres (5,069 ft). The northern slopes of the mountains are long and gentle, the southern slopes drop steeply towards the sea. The higher ridges are frequently flat, grassy plateaus. The geology of the mountains is mixture of shales, sandstones, limestones and conglomerates, from different times in the Jurassic. The variety of rocks have eroded to form a diversity of soils at the lower elevations, supporting mountain-steppe and meadow-steppe. The headwaters of the Alma River are in the reserve.

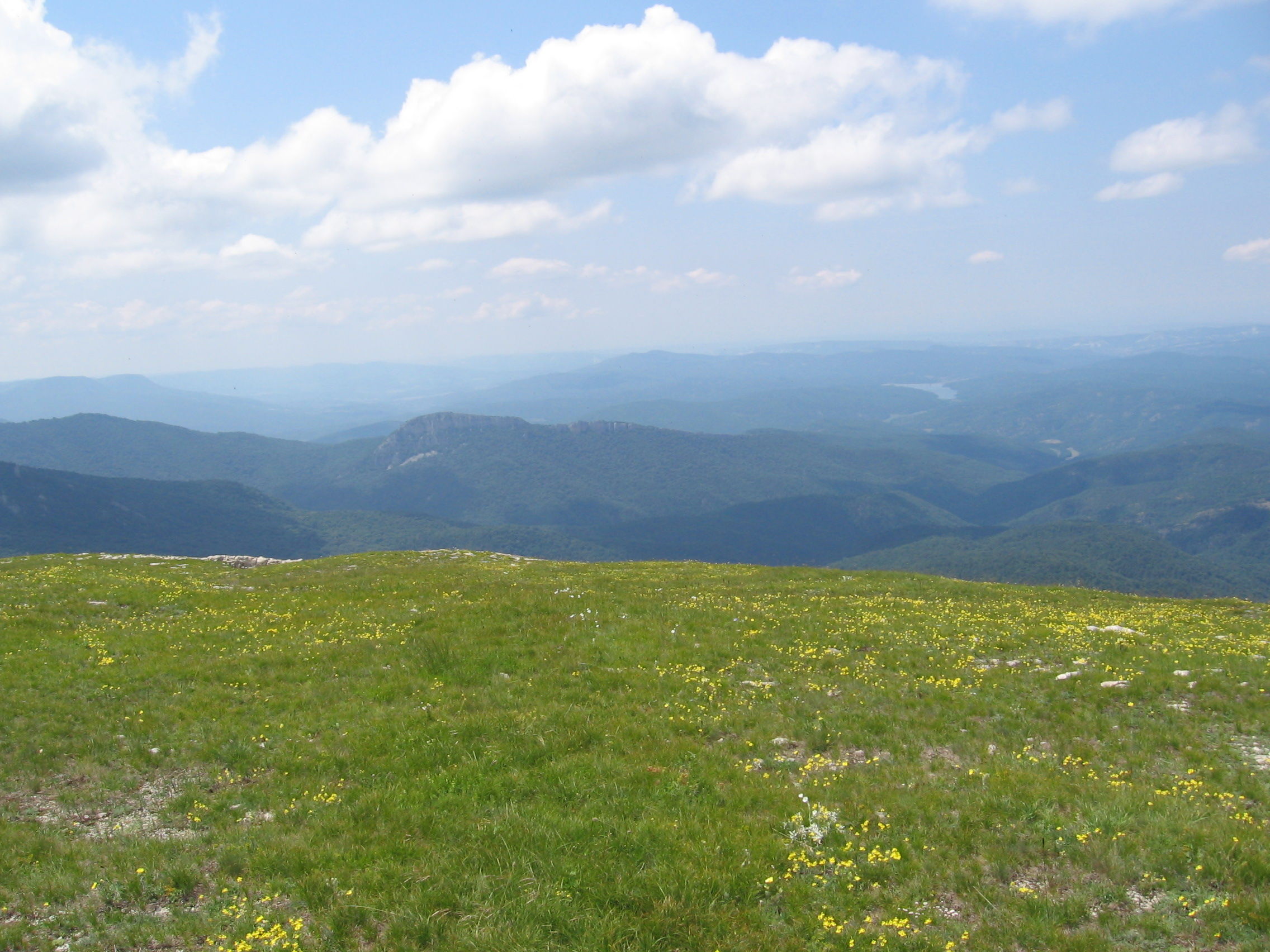
View from Roman-Kosh Mountain, in the Crimean Reserve

== Climate and ecoregion ==
The climate of the Crimean Reserve is Humid continental climate - Hot summer sub-type (Köppen climate classification Dfa), with large seasonal temperature differentials and a hot summer (at least one month averaging over 22 °C (72 °F)), and mild winters. In the reserve, the average temperature in February is 2 °C (36 °F), and 22 °C (72 °F) in July. Precipitation ranges from 470 mm/year at the lower elevations to 1,000 mm/year on the peaks.

The reserve is in the western extreme of the Crimean Submediterranean forest complex ecoregion, a small band of territory that stretches from the southern Crimean peninsula to the northern Caucasus Mountains.

== Flora and fauna ==
The reserve supports mountain-steppe and forest-steppe floral communities. Over 29,000 hectares are forested, with over half being oak. The oak forests are found at elevations of 600-900 meters above sea level. Beech forests cover 7,500 hectares, with some groves as much as 300 years old. Other common trees are pine, linden, hornbeam, and ash. Scientists in the reserve have recorded 1,357 species of vascular plants in 535 genera, an indication of high biodiversity. Common mammals are red deer, wild boar, European mouflon, and roe deer.

=== Important Bird Area ===
The reserve has been designated an Important Bird Area (IBA) by BirdLife International because it supports populations of corncrakes, tawny owls, griffon vultures, cinereous vultures and eastern imperial eagles.

== Public use ==
As a strict nature reserve, the Crimean Reserve's primary purpose is protection of nature and scientific study. Public access is limited: mass recreation and construction of facilities is prohibited as are hunting and fishing. This is, however, an ecological excursion route ("Crimea Reserve") on which reserve staff provided guided tours on buses and automobiles; this route follows the Romanov Trail. These guided tours are limited by law to protect the natural settings of the reserve. Just outside of the reserve in the town of Alushta, the reserve sponsors a Museum of Nature, and a Dendrozoological Park.

== See also ==
- Lists of Nature Preserves of Ukraine (class Ia protected areas)
- National Parks of Ukraine (class II protected areas)
