= Cape Aya =

Cape in Sevastopol, Crimea

Cape Aya: Ayya (Crimean Tatar); Мис Айя (Ukrainian); Мыс Айя (Russian)
- Cape
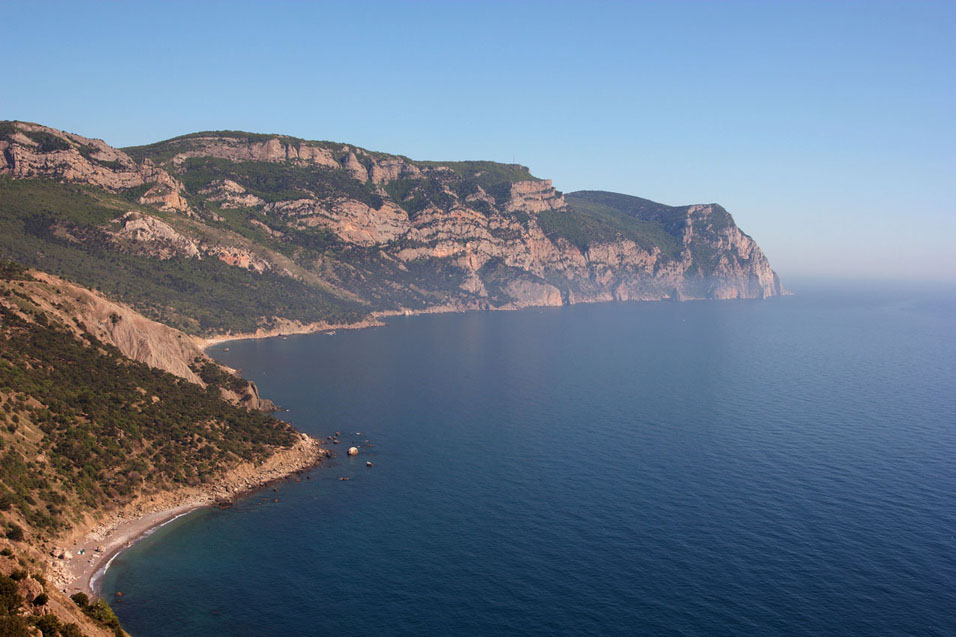
- Cape Aya

- Coordinates: 44°25′44″N 33°38′56″E
- Location: Sevastopol, Crimea

Cape Aya (Crimean Tatar: Ayya; Ukrainian: Мис Айя; Russian: Мыс Айя) is a rocky promontory jutting out into the Black Sea southeast of Balaklava. This 13-km-long spur of the Crimean Mountains separates Laspi Bay (to the east) from Balaklava Bay (to the west).

The name of the cape derives from "holy one" in Greek, “Άγια”.

The highest point, Kokiya-Kiya (literally "Blue Cliff") is 559 m (1,834 ft). The headland is full of grottoes; it is protected as a national zakaznik.

A storm off Cape Aya is the subject of one of Ivan Aivazovsky's paintings. A Soviet guided missile system was located on Cape Aya.

Viktor Yanukovych, the former President of Ukraine, ordered the construction of a luxurious private residence on Cape Aya. The "New Mezhyhyria", or popularly known as "Mezhyhirya 2" closed locals off from the coast, and was still unfinished when the Revolution of Dignity ousted Yanukovych from his post. =

== Putins luxus palast ==
In 2025, it was revealed that Vladimir Putin was planning an elaborate and luxurious expansion of his secret luxury palace, spending millions.
