= Roman-Kosh =

Mountain in Crimea

- Роман-Кош (Russian); Orman Qoş (Crimean Tatar); Роман-Кош (Ukrainian)
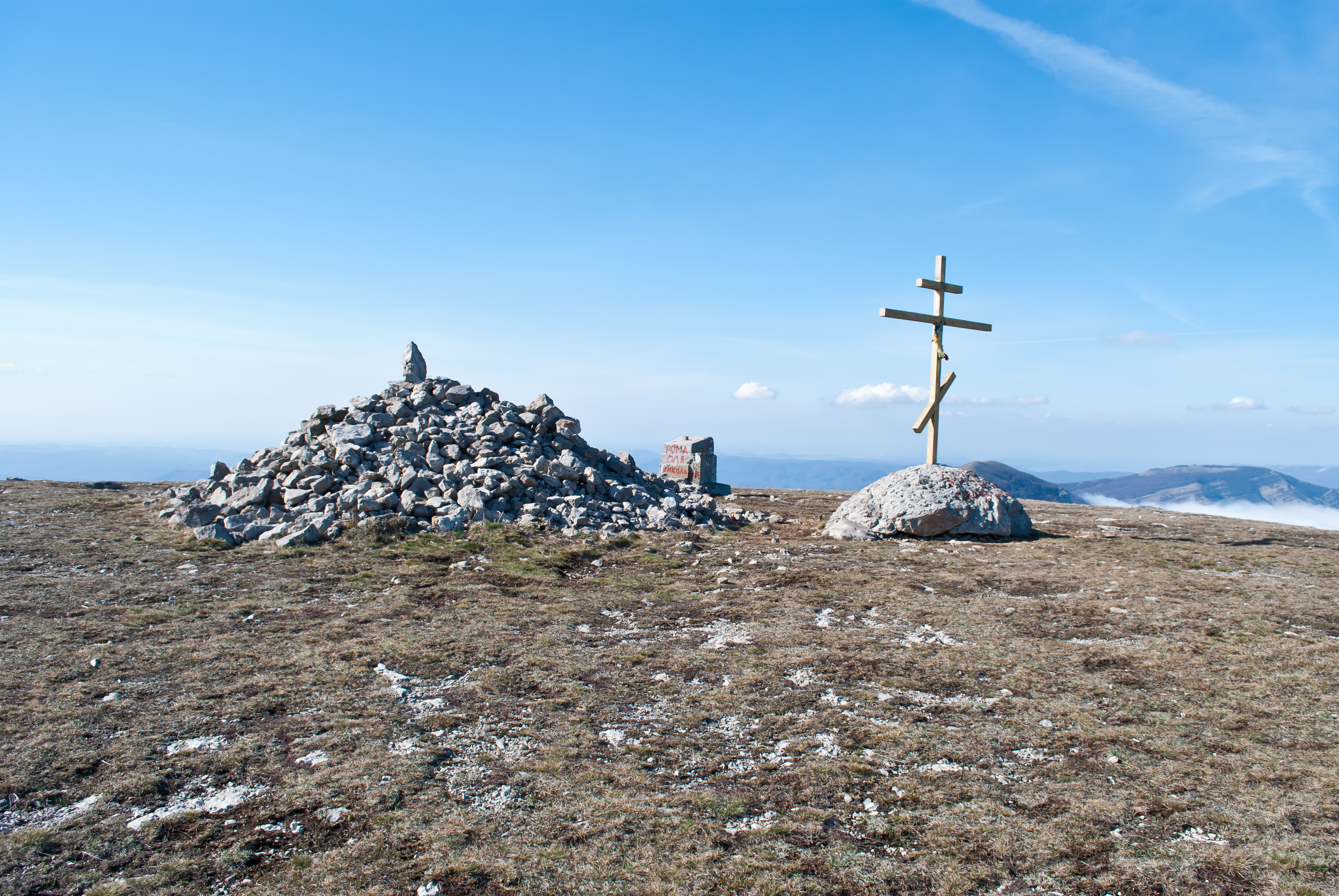

Highest point
- Elevation: 1,545 m (5,069 ft)
- Prominence: 1,541 m (5,056 ft)
- Listing: Ultra
- Coordinates: 44°36′47″N 34°14′36″E

Geography
- Location within Crimea
- Location: Crimea
- Countries: Disputed: Ukraine (de jure); Russia (de facto)
- Parent range: Crimean Mountains

Roman-Kosh (Crimean Tatar: Орман Къош, romanized: Orman Qoş; Russian: Роман-Кош;Ukrainian: Роман-Кош) is the highest peak of the Crimean Mountains.

== See also ==
- List of European ultra prominent peaks

== Sources ==
- Енциклопедія українознавства. У 10-х томах. / Головний редактор Володимир Кубійович. — Париж; Нью-Йорк: Молоде життя, 1954–1989.
