= Feathergrass =

Feathergrass is a common name for several plants and may refer to:

- Nassella, a genus of bunchgrasses
- Stipa, a genus of perennial hermaphroditic grasses
- Jarava ichu, commonly known as Peruvian feathergrass
