= Dwarf mountain pine =

Dwarf mountain pine may refer to:

- Pinus mugo, also called creeping pine, a conifer native to high elevation habitats in Europe.
- Pherosphaera fitzgeraldii, also called Blue Mountains pine, is a critically endangered conifer species found only in New South Wales, Australia.
