= Okhotnyche =

Okhotnyche Охотниче
- Rural settlement
- Location of Okhotnyche in Crimea
- Coordinates: 44°28′35″N 34°04′10″E
- Republic: Crimea
- Municipality: Yalta Municipality
- Elevation: 1,160 m (3,810 ft)

Population (2014)
  - Total: 17
- Time zone: UTC+4 (MSK)
- Postal code: 98655
- Area code: +380 654
- Website: http://rada.gov.ua/

Okhotnyche (Ukrainian: Охотниче; Russian: Охотничье; Crimean Tatar: Ohotniçye) is a rural settlement in the Yalta Municipality of the Autonomous Republic of Crimea, a territory recognized by a majority of countries as part of Ukraine and annexed by Russia as the Republic of Crimea.

Okhotnyche is the highest located settlement in Crimea, at an elevation of 1,160 metres (3,810 ft). The settlement is located on the Ai-Petri mountain 19 km (12 mi) southwest from Livadiya, which it is administratively subordinate to. Its population was 34 in the 2001 Ukrainian census. Current population: 17 (2014 Census).
