= Cape Martian Reserve =

Nature reserve on the Crimean Peninsula

- Мыс Мартьян
- IUCN category Ia (strict nature reserve)
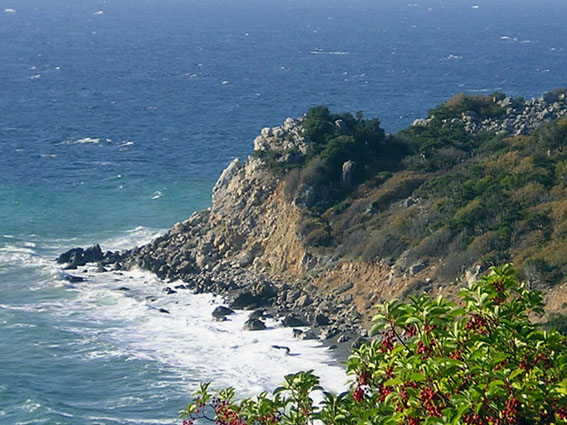

- Location within Crimea
- Location: Crimea
- Nearest city: Yalta
- Coordinates: 44.5068713°N 34.2508710°E
- Area: 240 ha (590 acres)
- Established: 1973

Cape Martian Reserve (Ukrainian: Мис Мартьян), also known as Cape Martyan Reserve, is a nature reserve located on the southern coast of the Crimean Peninsula, near the Ukrainian city of Yalta and the Nikitsky Botanical Gardens. Established to protect its unique ecosystem and biodiversity, the reserve is home to many plant and animal species, some of which are specific to the Mediterranean climate of the region. Given its ecological importance, it plays a role in conservation and scientific research. Its picturesque landscapes overlooking the Black Sea also make it a point of interest for nature enthusiasts.

== History ==
This reserve was established in 1973 by the decree of The Council of Ministers of the Ukrainian Soviet Socialist Republic of February 20, 1973 No. 84 on lands Nikitsky botanical garden. The area of the reserve is 240 hectares (590 acres), including 120 hectares (300 acres) of land and 120 hectares (300 acres) in the adjoining Black Sea.

== Geography ==
The area of allocation reserve is a region of complex and lengthy geological processes related with the deposition of sedimentary rocks (mostly of limestone) and with the raising of the crust. As a result, fragments of limestone from Nikita's chain broke away and dropped into the sea and formed Cape Martian. In orography this is a trail that is dissected by gullies, that stretch from Nikita's chain and dropped into the sea in some places (up to 100–200 m (330–660 ft)). The reserve covers the lower part of trail to a height of 250 m (820 ft) above sea level.

== Climate ==
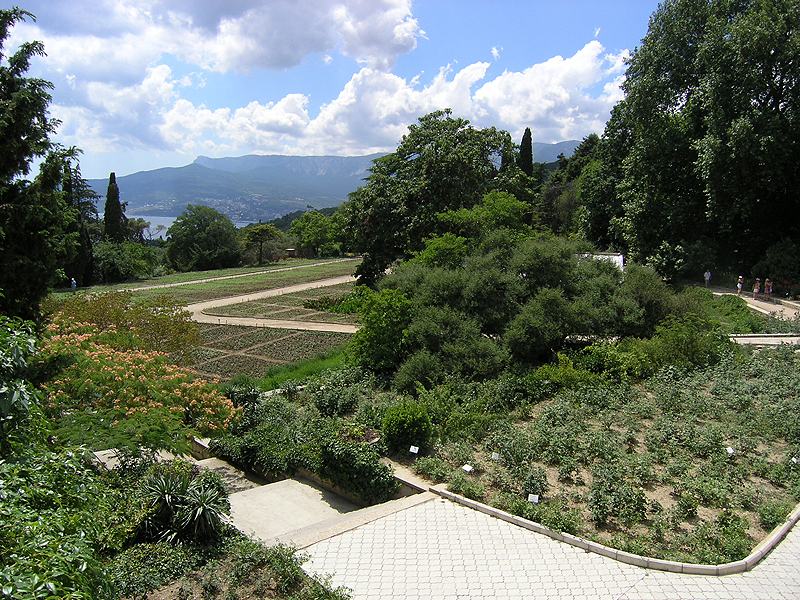
The Nikitsky Botanical Garden

The climate in reserve is warm and dry, because the north side is protected from cold winds by The Main ridge with the height 1,200–1,400 m (3,900–4,600 ft) above sea level. Summers are hot and dry, and winters are mild and wet. The average annual temperature is 13.3–13.9 °C (55.9–57.0 °F), average July temperature – 25 °C (77 °F), February -- 4 °C (39 °F), that characterized by rather low amplitude of oscillations. The average annual rainfall is 560 mm (22 in).

== Environment ==
The reserve preserves typical natural landscapes and a diverse range of Mediterranean-type plants and animals. This is because it sits on the northern edge of the Mediterranean plant region. The reserve's waters are among the few areas on Crimea's southern coast that remain in their natural state, featuring typical seabed plant life.

=== Flora ===
The reserve has vegetation typical of the Crimean Mediterranean region. The main forests consist of Downy Oak (Quercus pubescens), with some areas of Greek Juniper (Juniperus excelsa) and a few of Pinus nigra. Due to the warm climate and adequate rainfall, the area also has the unique-to-Crimea evergreen, Greek Strawberry Tree (Arbutus andrachne), as well as shrubs like Cistus tauricus, Ruscus aculeatus, and Hedera taurica

=== Important Bird Area ===
The reserve has been designated an Important Bird Area (IBA) by BirdLife International because it supports a population of great cormorants on migration.
